= List of companies of Sweden =

Location of Sweden

Sweden is a Scandinavian country in Northern Europe and the third-largest country in the European Union by area. It is also a member of the United Nations, the Nordic Council, Council of Europe, the World Trade Organization and the Organisation for Economic Co-operation and Development (OECD). Sweden maintains a Nordic social welfare system that provides universal health care and tertiary education for its citizens. It has the world's eighth-highest per capita income and ranks highly in numerous metrics of national performance, including quality of life, health, education, protection of civil liberties, economic competitiveness, equality, prosperity and human development.

For further information on the types of business entities in this country and their abbreviations, see "Business entities in Sweden".

== Largest firms ==
This list shows firms in the Fortune Global 500, which ranks firms by total revenues reported before March 31, 2017. Only the top five firms (if available) are included as a sample.

Rank	Image	Name	2016 revenues (US$M)	Employees	Notes
301		Volvo	35,269	89,477	Multinational manufacturer of trucks, buses, construction equipment and engines. The firm reached a high of 118, but revenues dropped significantly after selling its automotive brand to Ford Motor Company in 1999.
419		Ericsson	26,004	111,464	Multinational networking and telecommunications equipment and services company in Stockholm. After 23 years on the list, the firm has dropped from a high of 133 in 2001.
482		H&M	22,618	114,586	Swedish multinational clothing retailer; it is the second largest firm of its type and operates in 62 countries. The group is a recent addition to the Global 500, entering the list in 2016.

== Notable firms ==
This list includes notable companies with primary headquarters located in the country. The industry and sector follow the Industry Classification Benchmark taxonomy. Organizations which have ceased operations are included and noted as defunct.

Notable companies Status: P=Private, S=State; A=Active, D=Defunct
Name	Industry	Sector	Headquarters	Founded	Notes	Status	
3H Biomedical	Health care	Biotechnology	Uppsala	2004	Cell-based biotech	P	A
AarhusKarlshamn	Consumer goods	Food products	Malmö	2005	Vegetable oils, fats	P	A
Abba Seafood	Consumer goods	Food products	Gothenburg	1838	Seafood	P	A
ABU Garcia	Consumer goods	Recreational products	Svängsta	1921	Fishing reels, part of Newell Brands (US)	P	A
Acando	Technology	Software	Stockholm	2001	IT consulting	P	A
Acne Studios	Consumer goods	Clothing & accessories	Stockholm	1997	Fashion	P	A
Adtraction	Technology	Internet	Stockholm	2007	Internet marketing	P	A
AFRY	Industrials	Engineering consulting services	Stockholm	1895	Consulting	P	A
AGA	Oil & gas	Exploration & production	Luleå	1904	Defunct natural gas, now part of Linde AG	P	D
Åhléns	Consumer services	Broadline retailers	Stockholm	1899	Retail department stores	P	A
Alfa Laval	Industrials	Industrial machinery	Lund	1883	Heavy industry	P	A
Alfdex	Industrials	Industrial machinery	Landskrona	2002	Industrial separators	P	A
AP&T	Industrials	Industrial machinery	Ulricehamn	1989	Metal forming machinery	P	A
Apoteket	Health care	Pharmaceuticals	Stockholm	1970	State pharma	S	A
Aptilo Networks	Telecommunications	Mobile telecommunications	Stockholm	2001	Mobile services	P	A
Arcam	Industrials	Industrial suppliers	Mölndal	1997	3D printing	P	A
ASEA	Industrials	Diversified industrials	Västerås	1883	Manufacturer, part of ABB as of 1988	P	D
ABB	Industrials	Industrial machinery	Västerås/Zürich	1988	Robotics, automation	P	A
Assa Abloy	Industrials	Industrial suppliers	Stockholm	1994	Locks	P	A
Astra AB	Health care	Pharmaceuticals	Södertälje	1913	Defunct 1999, now merged into AstraZeneca (UK)	P	D
Atlas Copco	Industrials	Diversified industrials	Nacka	1873	Industrials	P	A
Autoliv	Industrials	Business support services	Stockholm	1997	Automotive safety	P	A
Avanza	Financials	Investment services	Stockholm	1999	Stock broker	P	A
Axel Johnson	Conglomerates	-	Stockholm	1873	Retail holdings, part of Axel Johnson Group	P	A
Axel Johnson Group	Conglomerates	-	Stockholm	1873	Diversified holdings	P	A
Axfood	Consumer services	Food retailers & wholesalers	Stockholm	1964	Grocery chain, part of Axel Johnson AB	P	A
Axis Communications	Technology	Computer hardware	Lund	1984	Network cameras, part of Canon Inc. (Japan)	P	A
BAE Systems	Industrials	Defense	Örnsköldsvik	2006	Defence, part of BAE Systems (UK)	P	A
Bahco	Industrials	Diversified industrials	Enköping	1886	Part of Snap-on (US)	P	A
Bahnhof	Telecommunications	Fixed line telecommunications	Stockholm	1994	Internet service provider	P	A
Ballograf	Consumer goods	Nondurable household products	Gothenburg	1945	Ballpoint pens and pencils	P	A
Berg Propulsion	Industrials	Industrial machinery	Gothenburg	1912	Controllable pitch propellers	P	A
Biacore	Health care	Biotechnology	Uppsala	1984	Part of GE Healthcare (US)	P	A
Billerud	Basic materials	Paper	Solna	2012	Paper	P	A
Biltema	Retail	Industrial equipment	Gothenburg	1963	Hardware store	P	A
Bindomatic	Industrials	Industrial suppliers	Stockholm	1974	Office supplies	P	A
BioGaia	Health care	Pharmaceuticals	Stockholm	1990	Probiotic	P	A
Björn Borg	Consumer goods	Clothing & accessories	Stockholm	2004	Fashion	P	A
Bofors	Industrials	Defense	Karlskoga	1873	Arms	P	A
Boghammar Marin AB	Industrials	Commercial vehicles & trucks	Lidingö	1906	Shipyard	P	A
Boliden	Basic materials	General mining	Stockholm	1931	Mining	P	A
Bolinder-Munktell	Industrials	Commercial vehicles & trucks	Eskilstuna	1932	Defunct, now a part of Volvo Construction Equipment	P	D
Bona AB	Industrials	Building materials & fixtures	Malmö	1919	Flooring	P	A
Bonnier Group	Consumer services	Broadcasting & entertainment	Stockholm	1804	Media group	P	A
Braathens Regional Aviation	Consumer services	Airlines	Malmö	1981	Airline	P	A
Bredbandsbolaget	Telecommunications	Fixed line telecommunications	Stockholm	1998	Triple play services, part of Telenor (Norway)	P	A
Camfil	Industrials	Industrial machinery	Stockholm	1963	Air filtration	P	A
Carnegie Investment Bank	Financials	Investment services	Stockholm	1803	Financial services	P	A
Cederroth	Health care	Health care providers	Upplands Väsby	1895	Personal health care	P	A
Cheap Monday	Consumer goods	Clothing & accessories	Stockholm	2000	Clothing	P	A
Clas Ohlson	Consumer services	Home improvement retailers	Insjön	1918	Hardware stores	P	A
Cloetta	Consumer goods	Food products	Stockholm	1862	Chocolate	P	A
Columbitech	Technology	Software	Stockholm	2000	Wireless security	P	A
CombinedX	Technology	Software	Karlstad	1993	Consists of 9 specialised IT consulting companies.	P	A
Comviq	Telecommunications	Fixed line telecommunications	Stockholm	1981	Merged into Tele2, retained as a brand	P	A
Coop Norden	Consumer services	Food retailers & wholesalers	Stockholm	2001	Retail chain, defunct 2008	P	D
Dataphone	Telecommunications	Telecommunications services	Stockholm	2001	Telecommunications	P	A
Datasaab	Industrials	Business support services	Linköping	1954	Computer division of Saab, defunct	P	D
DeLaval	Industrials	Industrial machinery	Tumba	1883	Farm machines	P	A
Destination Gotland	Consumer services	Travel & tourism	Visby	1998	Ferry line	P	A
Diamyd Medical	Health care	Biotechnology	Stockholm	1994	Research	P	A
Dockstavarvet	Industrials	Commercial vehicles & trucks	Docksta	1905	Shipyard, Part of Saab Group since 2017	P	A
Domnarvet	Basic materials	Iron & steel	Borlänge	1872	Iron, part of SSAB	P	A
Doro	Technology	Telecommunications equipment	Malmö	1974	Telecom products	P	A
Elanders	Industrials	Business support services	Mölnlycke	1908	Printing	P	A
Electrolux	Consumer goods	Durable household products	Stockholm	1919	Appliances	P	A
Elekta	Health care	Health care providers	Stockholm	1972	Radiation therapy	P	A
Elfa International	Consumer goods	Furnishings	Malmö	1948	Shelving	P	A
Ellos	Consumer services	Broadline retailers	Borås	1947	E-commerce	P	A
ENEA AB	Technology	Software	Kista	1968	Information technology	P	A
Eniro	Technology	Internet	Stockholm	2000	Directory, search services	P	A
Ericsson	Technology	Telecommunications equipment	Stockholm	1876	Communication technology	P	A
ESAB	Industrials	Business support services	Gothenburg	1904	Welding, part of Colfax Corporation (US)	P	A
Esselte	Industrials	Industrial suppliers	Stockholm	1913	Office products, part of J.W. Childs Associates (US)	P	A
Essity	Consumer goods	Personal products	Stockholm	2017	Tissue paper	P	A
European Spallation Source	Industrials	Business support services	Lund	2013	Research	P	A
Fagerhult Group	Industrials	Building materials & fixtures	Habo	1945	Lighting	P	A
Fjällräven	Consumer goods	Clothing & accessories	Örnsköldsvik	1960	Outdoor clothing	P	A
FKAB	Industrials	Business support services	Uddevalla	1961	Ship design	P	A
Folksam	Financials	Full line insurance	Stockholm	1914	Financial services	P	A
Föreningsbanken	Financials	Banks	Stockholm	1992	Rural bank, defunct 1997	P	D
Forex Bank	Financials	Investment services	Stockholm	1927	Currency exchange	P	A
Gekås	Consumer services	Broadline retailers	Falkenberg	1963	Swedish superstore	P	A
Getinge Group	Health care	Medical equipment	Gothenburg	1904	Medical technology	P	A
Göinge Mekaniska	Industrials	Heavy construction	Hässleholm	1946	Steel buildings, defunct 2005. Merged into Skanska	P	A
Green Cargo	Industrials	Delivery services	Solna	2001	State logistics	S	A
Grimaldi Industri	Conglomerates	-	Stockholm	1970	Consumer goods, industrials	P	A
Gunnebo Group	Industrials	Business support services	Gothenburg	1889	Security	P	A
H&M	Consumer services	Apparel retailers	Stockholm	1947	Retail clothing	P	A
Haglöfs	Consumer goods	Recreational products	Torsång	1914	Outdoor equipment	P	A
Haldex	Consumer goods	Auto parts	Landskrona	1887	Automotive parts	P	A
Hallberg-Rassy	Consumer goods	Recreational products	Ellös	1943	Sailing yachts	P	A
Handelsbanken	Financials	Banks	Stockholm	1871	Bank	P	A
Hasselblad	Consumer goods	Recreational products	Gothenburg	1841	Cameras	P	A
Hästens	Consumer services	Specialty retailers	Köping	1852	Beds	P	A
Hestra	Consumer goods	Clothing & accessories	Hestra	1936	Gloves	P	A
Hexagon AB	Industrials	Business support services	Stockholm	1992	Metrology	P	A
HMS Industrial Networks	Telecommunications	Fixed line telecommunications	Halmstad	1988	Industrial communications	P	A
Höganäs AB	Basic materials	Iron & steel	Höganäs	1797	Powdered metals	P	A
Holmen	Basic materials	Paper	Stockholm	1875	Paper	P	A
Husaberg	Consumer goods	Automobiles	Mattighofen	1988	Motorcycles	P	A
Husqvarna Group	Industrials	Industrial suppliers	Stockholm	1689	Commercial tools	P	A
Hydrauliska Industri AB	Industrials	Commercial vehicles & trucks	Hudiksvall	1944	Lifts and cranes, part of Cargotec (Finland)	P	A
IAR Systems	Technology	Software	Uppsala	1983	Software	P	A
ICA Gruppen	Consumer services	Broadline retailers	Stockholm	1938	Retailing group	P	A
IFS AB	Technology	Software	Linköping	1983	Software	P	A
Ikano Bank	Financials	Banks	Malmö	1995	Bank	P	A
IKEA	Retail	Furniture	Delft	1943	Ready to assemble furniture, household goods	P	A
IMINT Image Intelligence AB	Technology	Software	Uppsala	2007	Software	P	A
Infranord	Industrials	Railroads	Solna	2010	Railways	S	A
Ingate Systems	Technology	Software	Stockholm	2001	Data security	P	A
Intertex	Technology	Computer hardware	Stockholm	2001	Computer peripherals	P	A
Investment AB Latour	Financials	Investment services	Gothenburg	1984	Investments	P	A
Investment AB Öresund	Financials	Investment services	Stockholm	1961	Investments	P	A
Investor AB	Financials	Investment services	Stockholm	1916	Investments	P	A
IsaDora	Consumer goods	Personal products	Malmö	1983	Cosmetics	P	A
iZettle	Technology	Software	Stockholm	2011	Financial technology	P	A
J.Lindeberg	Consumer goods	Clothing & accessories	Stockholm	1997	Clothing	P	A
Jeeves	Technology	Software	Stockholm	1992	Software	P	A
Jernhusen	Industrials	Railroads	Stockholm	2001	Railways	S	A
Jofa	Consumer goods	Recreational products	Malung	1926	Sport equipment, part of Reebok (US)	P	A
Jonsereds Fabrikers AB	Industrials	Industrial machinery	Jonsered	1832	Part of Husqvarna Group	P	A
Kinnevik AB	Financials	Investment services	Stockholm	1936	Investments	P	A
Klarna	Consumer services	Broadline retailers	Stockholm	2005	E-commerce	P	A
Kockums Naval Solutions	Industrials	Commercial vehicles & trucks	Malmö	1840	Shipyard	P	A
Koenigsegg	Consumer goods	Automobiles	Ängelholm	1994	Automotive	P	A
Kooperativa Förbundet	Consumer services	Consumer co-operatives	Stockholm	1899	Retailing group	P	A
Kosta Boda	Industrials	Building materials & fixtures	Kosta	1742	Glass	P	A
Kungsörnen	Consumer goods	Food products	Järna	1929	Food	P	A
L E Lundbergföretagen	Financials	Investment services	Stockholm	1944	Investments	P	A
Länsförsäkringar	Financials	Full line insurance	Stockholm	1801	Insurance cooperative	P	A
Länsförsäkringar Bank	Financials	Banks	Stockholm	1996	Bank, part of Länsförsäkringar	P	A
Lantmännen	Consumer goods	Farming & fishing	Stockholm	2001	Agriculture cooperative	P	A
Lindex	Consumer services	Apparel retailers	Gothenburg	1954	Fashion retailer	P	A
Linjeflyg	Consumer services	Airlines	Stockholm	1957	Airline, defunct 1993, acquired by SAS	P	D
LKAB	Basic materials	General mining	Luleå	1890	Mining	P	A
Loomis	Industrials	Business support services	Stockholm	1997	Security	P	A
Lundin Petroleum	Oil & gas	Exploration & production	Stockholm	2001	Petroleum	P	A
Luxor AB	Consumer goods	Consumer electronics	Motala	1923	Defunct home electronics, acquired by Nokia (Finland)	P	D
Lyko Group AB	Online retail	Cosmetics	Stockholm	2003	Among the largest online retail companies in Sweden	P	A
Mälarenergi	Utilities	Conventional electricity	Västerås	1861	Power	P	A
Mecel	Technology	Software	Gothenburg	1982	Software and systems consulting	P	A
Meda AB	Health care	Pharmaceuticals	Solna	1954	Pharmaceutical	P	A
Micromy	Basic materials	Specialty chemicals	Täby	2009	Industrial coatings	P	A
Modern Times Group (MTG)	Consumer services	Broadcasting & entertainment	Stockholm	1987	Digital entertainment	P	A
Mölnlycke Health Care	Health care	Medical equipment	Gothenburg	1849	Medical device	P	A
Monark	Consumer goods	Recreational products	Vansbro	1908	Bicycle	P	A
MySQL AB	Technology	Software	Uppsala	1995	Defunct 2008, acquired by Sun Microsystems (US)	P	D
Najad Yachts	Consumer goods	Recreational products	Henån	1971	Sailing yachts	P	A
Nanoradio	Technology	Semiconductors	Kista	2004	Wireless semiconductors, part of Samsung (South Korea)	P	A
Nasdaq Nordic	Financials	Investment services	Stockholm	2003	Stock exchange, part of Nasdaq, Inc. (US)	P	A
NCC AB	Industrials	Heavy construction	Solna	1988	Construction	P	A
Nextjet	Consumer services	Airlines	Stockholm	2002	Regional airline	P	A
Nobia	Consumer goods	Durable household products	Stockholm	1996	Kitchen goods	P	A
Nobina	Consumer services	Travel & tourism	Stockholm	1999	Public transport	P	A
NOHAB	Industrials	Diversified industrials	Trollhättan	1916	Manufacturing, defunct 1979	P	D
Nordiska Kompaniet	Consumer services	Broadline retailers	Stockholm	1864	Retail department stores	P	A
Nordstjernan	Conglomerates	-	Stockholm	1890	Part of Axel Johnson Group	P	A
Norma Precision	Industrials	Defense	Åmotfors	1895	Ammunition	P	A
NorthStar	Industrials	General industries	Stockholm	2000	Lead-acid batteries	P	A
Northvolt	Industrials	Electrical components	Stockholm	2015	Batteries, defunct 2025	P	D
Nudie Jeans	Consumer goods	Clothing & accessories	Gothenburg	2001	Clothing	P	A
Nyby bruk	Basic materials	Iron & steel	Torshälla	1829	Stainless steel, a part of Outokumpu (Finland)	P	A
Nyfors	Technology	Telecommunications equipment	Stockholm	1987	Optical fiber equipment	P	A
Nynas	Oil & gas	Exploration & production	Stockholm	1928	Petrochemical products	P	A
Öhlins	Consumer goods	Auto parts	Upplands Väsby	1976	Automotive parts	P	A
Onoff	Consumer services	Broadline retailers	Upplands Väsby	1971	Retail chain, defunct 2011	P	D
Orexo	Health care	Pharmaceuticals	Uppsala	1995	Pharmaceutical	P	A
Oriflame	Consumer goods	Personal products	Stockholm	1967	Cosmetics	P	A
Orrefors Glassworks	Industrials	Building materials & fixtures	Orrefors	1898	Glassworks	P	A
Oskarshamn Shipyard	Industrials	Commercial vehicles & trucks	Oskarshamn	1863	Shipyard	P	A
Ovako	Basic materials	Iron & steel	Stockholm	1969	Steel	P	A
Pågen	Consumer goods	Food products	Malmö	1878	Bakery	P	A
Peab	Industrials	Heavy construction	Förslöv	1959	Construction	P	A
Peltarion	Technology	Software	Stockholm	2004	Software	P	A
Phadia	Health care	Medical equipment	Uppsala	1971	Blood test systems	P	A
Pharmacia	Health care	Pharmaceuticals	Stockholm	1911	Pharma, defunct 2002	P	A
Polarbröd	Consumer goods	Food products	Älvsbyn	1972	Bread	P	A
PostNord	Industrials	Delivery services	Solna	2009	Mail, logistics	S	A
PostNord Sverige	Industrials	Delivery services	Solna	1636	Mail, part of PostNord	S	A
Praktikertjänst	Health care	Dental care	Stockholm	1977	Local clinics	P	A
Primus AB	Consumer goods	Household goods	Stockholm	1892	Portable cooking devices	P	A
Profoto	Industrials	Building materials & fixtures	Stockholm	1968	Lighting	P	A
Ratos	Financials	Real estate holding & development	Stockholm	1933	Private equity	P	A
ReadSoft	Technology	Software	Helsingborg	1991	Software	P	A
Recipharm	Health care	Pharmaceuticals	Haninge	1995	Pharmaceutical	P	A
Rederi AB Slite	Consumer services	Travel & tourism	Gothenburg	1947	Ferry-line, defunct 1993	P	D
Remograph	Technology	Software	Linköping	2005	Software	P	A
Resurs Holding	Financials	Banks	Helsingborg	2001	Bank	P	A
Saab Automobile	Consumer goods	Automobiles	Trollhättan	1945	Automotive, defunct 2012	P	D
Saab Group	Industrials	Aerospace	Stockholm	1937	Aerospace	P	A
Sandvik	Industrials	Industrial engineering	Stockholm	1862	Engineering	P	A
SAS Group (Swedish-Norwegian-Danish)	Consumer services	Airlines	Solna	1946	Airlines	P	A
SCA	Basic materials	Paper	Sundsvall	1929	Paper	P	A
Scalado	Technology	Software	Lund	2000	Software, part of Microsoft (US)	P	A
Scania AB	Consumer goods	Automobiles	Södertälje	1891	Commercial automotive, part of Volkswagen Group (Germany)	P	A
Seavus	Technology	Software	Malmö	1999	Software	P	A
SEB Group	Financials	Investment services	Stockholm	1972	Financial services	P	A
Securitas	Industrials	Business support services	Stockholm	1934	Security	P	A
Securitas Direct	Industrials	Business support services	Malmö	1988	Security	P	A
Semcon	Industrials	Business support services	Gothenburg	1980	Consulting	P	A
SIBA	Consumer services	Specialty retailers	Gothenburg	1951	Home electronics retailer, defunct 2017	P	D
Silva compass	Consumer goods	Recreational products	Stockholm	1932	Navigation equipment	P	A
SJ AB	Consumer services	Travel & tourism	Stockholm	2001	Public transport	P	A
Skandia	Financials	Investment services	Stockholm	1855	Financial services, part of Old Mutual (UK)	P	A
Skandinaviska Banken	Financials	Banks	Gothenburg	1864	Bank, defunct 1972, merged into SEB	P	A
Skånemejerier	Consumer goods	Food products	Malmö	1964	Dairy	P	A
Skanska	Industrials	Heavy construction	Stockholm	1887	Construction	P	A
Skellefteå Kraft	Utilities	Conventional electricity	Skellefteå	1906	Power	P	A
SKF	Industrials	Industrial suppliers	Gothenburg	1907	Mechanical parts	P	A
Smart Eye	Technology	Software	Gothenburg	1999	Hardware and software	P	A
Södra	Basic materials	Paper	Växjö	1938	Paper pulp, sawmills	P	A
Specma	Industrial	Industrial Engineering	Gothenburg	1918	Hydraulics, purchased by Danish company Hydra-Grene in 2022	P	A
Spotify	Technology	Internet	Stockholm	2006	Music streaming	P	A
SR International – Radio Sweden	Consumer services	Broadcasting & entertainment	Stockholm	1938	State broadcasting, part of Sveriges Radio	S	A
SSAB	Basic materials	Iron & steel	Stockholm	1978	Steel	P	A
Stena Line	Consumer services	Travel & tourism	Gothenburg	1962	Ferry-line	P	A
Stena Sphere	Conglomerates	-	Gothenburg	1939	Transportation, real estate, financials, drilling	P	A
Stiga	Consumer goods	Durable household products	Eskilstuna	1934	Garden mowers, now part of Global Garden Products S.p.A.	P	A
Stockholm Stock Exchange	Financials	Investment services	Stockholm	1863	Stock exchange, part of Nasdaq Nordic	P	A
Stockholms Enskilda Bank	Financials	Banks	Stockholm	1856	Bank, defunct 1972, merged into SEB	P	D
Studsvik	Utilities	Conventional electricity	Nyköping	1947	Power	P	A
Sveriges Television	Consumer services	Broadcasting & entertainment	Stockholm	1956	Swedish national public TV broadcaster	P	A
Sweco	Industrials	Business support services	Stockholm	1997	Consulting, part of Investment AB Latour	P	A
Swedbank	Financials	Banks	Stockholm	1820	Bank	P	A
Swedish Meats	Livestock	Meat	Stockholm			P	A
Swedish Orphan Biovitrum	Health care	Health care providers	Stockholm	2001	Specialty healthcare	P	A
Swedish Space Corporation	Industrials	Aerospace	Solna	1972	Space	P	A
Swegon	Industrials	Industrial machinery	Gothenburg	2005	Ventilation systems, part of Investment AB Latour	P	A
Symsoft	Telecommunications	Mobile telecommunications	Stockholm	1989	Mobile services	P	A
Syncron International AB	Technology	Software	Stockholm	1990	Software	P	A
Tele2	Telecommunications	Fixed line telecommunications	Stockholm	1993	Telecommunications provider	P	A
Telelogic	Technology	Software	Malmö	1983	Software, part of IBM (US)	P	A
Telia Company	Telecommunications	Mobile telecommunications	Stockholm	2003	Mobile networks	P	A
Teracom	Consumer services	Broadcasting & entertainment	Stockholm	1992	Terrestrial broadcaster	S	A
TerraNet AB	Telecommunications	Mobile telecommunications	Lund	2004	Mobile network	P	A
Tetra Pak	Industrials	Containers & packaging	Lund/Pully	1951	Food packaging	P	A
Thule Group	Consumer goods	Recreational products	Hillerstorp	1942	Outdoor and car accessories	P	A
Transmode	Telecommunications	Fixed line telecommunications	Stockholm	2000	Network solutions	P	A
Trelleborg	Industrials	Business support services	Trelleborg	1905	Engineering	P	A
Truecaller	Technology	Software	Stockholm	2009	Mobile identification	P	A
Trustly	Financials	Banks	Stockholm	2008	Online banking payments	P	A
TV4 Group	Consumer services	Broadcasting & entertainment	Stockholm	1984	Media	P	A
Uddeholms AB	Basic materials	Iron & steel	Hagfors	1668	Steel, a part of Voestalpine (Austria)	P	A
Umeå Energi	Utilities	Conventional electricity	Umeå	1887	Power	P	A
Urbanears	Consumer goods	Consumer electronics	Stockholm	2009	Headphones	P	A
Vabis	Industrials	Diversified industrials	Södertälje	1891	Defunct 1911	P	D
Vattenfall	Utilities	Conventional electricity	Stockholm	1909	State power	S	A
Vida AB	Basic materials	Forestry	Alvesta	1969	Sawmills	P	A
Volvo	Industrials	Commercial vehicles & trucks	Gothenburg	1927	Industrial vehicles	P	A
Volvo Buses	Industrials	Commercial vehicles & trucks	Gothenburg	1968	Bus manufacturer	P	A
Volvo Cars	Consumer goods	Automobiles	Gothenburg	1927	Automotive	P	A
Volvo Penta	Consumer goods	Auto parts	Skövde	1907	Engines, part of Volvo	P	A
Volvo Trucks	Industrials	Commercial vehicles & trucks	Gothenburg	1928	Trucks, part of Volvo	P	A
VSM Group	Consumer goods	Durable household products	Huskvarna	1872	Sewing machines, part of SVP Worldwide	P	A
Wallenius Lines	Industrials	Marine transportation	Stockholm	1934	Shipping	P	A
Wasabröd	Consumer goods	Food products	Skellefteå	1919	Bread, now part of Barilla Group (Italy)	P	A
WESC	Consumer goods	Clothing & accessories	Stockholm	1999	Clothing	P	A
WM-data	Technology	Software	Stockholm	1969	IT consulting, defunct 2008	P	D

== See also ==
- Economy of Sweden
- List of banks in Sweden
- List of Swedish government enterprises
