= On-off =

On-off or Onoff may refer to:

- On-off control, a type of feedback controller
- On-off keying, a type of line modulation
- On-off relationship, a form of personal relationship
- On-Off Singles, a type of tennis game
- On-off switch, a type of electric switch
- Onoff (retailer), an electronics retailer in Estonia, formerly also active in Sweden and Finland

== Music ==
- Onoff (Irish band), an Irish punk-rock band
- On/Off (Japanese band), a Japanese j-pop band
- On/Off (ONF EP), 2017
- On/Off (Run On EP), 1995
- On-Off (album), a 2006 album by Marcin Rozynek

== See also ==
- On and Off (disambiguation)
- "Off & On", a song by Sophie Ellis-Bextor
- "Off/On", a 2022 song by Collar
- OffOn, a film by Scott Bartlett
