= Hestra (disambiguation) =

Hestra may refer to:

- Hestra, company manufacturing gloves
- Hestra, Ydre, a locality situated in Ydre Municipality, Östergötland County, Sweden
- Hestra, Gislaved, a locality situated in Gislaved Municipality, Jönköping County, Sweden
