= Göinge =

Göinge may refer to:

- Östra Göinge Municipality, a municipality in Skåne County, Sweden
- Göinge Eastern Hundred, a hundred in Scania, Sweden
- Göinge Western Hundred, a hundred in Scania, Sweden
- Göinge (region), Scania, organised in 1637 into the Eastern and Western Hundreds
- Göinge Mekaniska, one of the leading Swedish steel building companies
