= Tinc =

Tinc or TINC may refer to:

- Tinc (band) from Japan
- Tinc (protocol) in computing
- Tinc (retail), UK store chain
- The (International) Noise Conspiracy, a Swedish rock band
- There Is No Cabal, a Usenet catchphrase
- TiNC, a coating material made by Micromy
- tinc, a nickname for the dyeing poison dart frog
