= Diamyd =

Diamyd may refer to:

- Diamyd Medical
- A vaccine consisting of GAD65, for Type 1 diabetes
