= ISGEC =

Indian heavy engineering company

Isgec Heavy Engineering Ltd.
- Type: Public
- Traded as: BSE: 533033; NSE: ISGEC
- Industry: Heavy equipment
- Founded: 1933
- Headquarters: Noida, India
- Key people: Aditya Puri, Managing Director
- Products: Process equipment, EPC projects, boilers, sugar plants and machinery, mechanical and hydraulic presses, steel and iron castings, air pollution control equipment and contract manufacturing
- Revenue: ₹6,245 crore (US$670 million)
- Number of employees: 4500
- Parent: Isgec Heavy Engineering Ltd.
- Website: www.isgec.com

Isgec Heavy Engineering Ltd (/ˈɪzdʒɛk/ IZ-jek; formerly known as Indian Sugar and General Engineering Corporation) is an Indian engineering company that manufactures industrial equipment and undertakes engineering, procurement and construction EPC projects. Its activities include process equipment, industrial boilers, sugar and distilleries plants, mechanical and hydraulic presses, castings, and air-pollution-control systems. Established in 1933 as Saraswati Sugar Syndicate, the company held a revenue of ₹6,922 crore (US$740 million) in 2026 with exports of approximately 99 countries. It was ranked 340 in the ET 2025 listing, and 371 in the Fortune India 500 Listings.

The company has its manufacturing plants and design offices spread across India; in Haryana, Uttar Pradesh, Gujarat, Tamil Nadu and Maharashtra.

== History ==
ISGEC originated from Saraswati Sugar Mills established in 1933, with a sugarcane crushing capacity of 400 tonnes per day. It has grown into one of India's largest sugar mills and now crushes 13,000 tonnes per day. It is today a subsidiary company. At the time of the nation's independence, the need for an Indian capital goods industry was recognized and ISGEC was established in 1946. The initial activity was the manufacture of spares for sugar mills. In the course of its history, the company diversified into a range of engineering products. In 1964, it established a joint venture with John Thompson of the UK to form Isgec John Thompson. In 1981, it acquired majority shares in Uttar Pradesh Steels. Both units were subsequently absorbed into the parent company. In 2011, the company name was changed from Saraswati Industrial Syndicate Ltd. to Isgec Heavy Engineering Ltd. with all businesses consolidated and now marketed under a common brand name – ISGEC.

In 2018, the company acquired 100% stake in Eagle Press & Equipment Co. Ltd., a Press manufacturing company in Windsor (Ontario) Canada.

== Operations ==
Isgec manufactures industrial equipment and provides engineering, procurement and construction services. Its business areas include mechanical and hydraulic presses & press brakes, process equipment, liquified gas containers, boiler pressure parts, prefabricated piping spools, process Modules & skids, contract manufacturing, industrial & green energy boilers, power plants, Bioenergy (distillery & compressed biogas), sugar plants, emission control solutions equipment, bulk material handling, process plants, railway projects, lifecycle support services and operations & maintenance services .

The company operates manufacturing facilities in Yamunanagar, Rattangarh, Damla, Bhartoli, Aurangabad, Dahej, Bawal and Muzaffarnagar, and maintains offices in several major Indian cities.

== Export ==
Isgec products have been supplied to companies across 99 countries, many of whom have placed repeat orders to them. These include:

- ABB Group, Switzerland
- Siemens, Germany
- Foster Wheeler, China
- Sumitomo, Japan
- Foster Wheeler, U.S.
- Valeo, France
- GE Hydro, Canada
- Virginia Tech, U.S.
- LuK, Germany
- Wesfarmers Group, Australia

== Strategic partnerships ==
- Amec Foster Wheeler North America Corp, U.S. (now with Wood Group, UK) for Circulating Fluidized Bed Combustion (CFBC) Boilers up to 99.9 Mwe, Oil and Gas, Shop Assembled Water Tube Packaged Boilers up to 260 tonnes per hour, Pulverized Coal Fired Sub-Critical Boilers and Super-Critical Boilers (60 to 1000 Mwe), Feed Water Heaters and Surface Condensers and Reheat Design of CFBC Boilers up to 100 MW
- AP&T, Sweden for Press Hardening Lines used for forming of High Strength Steel Automobile Body Parts
- Babcock Power Environmental Inc, U.S. for SOx reduction process by use of Wet Flue Gas Desulfurization (FGD) Units
- BHI FW Corporation, South Korea for Pulverized Coal Fired Sub-Critical Boilers and Super-Critical Boilers (60 to 1000 Mwe)
- CB&I Technology Inc., U.S. for Helix Heat Exchangers
- Envirotherm GmbH, Germany for reduction of Particulate Matter emissions by use of Electrostatic Precipitators performance improvement technologies (especially Flue Gas Conditioning) and NOx reduction processes by use of Urea or Ammonia (SNCR)
- Fuel Tech Inc., U.S. for reduction of Particulate Matter emissions by use of Electrostatic Precipitators performance improvement technologies (especially Flue Gas Conditioning) and NOx reduction processes by use of Urea or Ammonia (SNCR)
- Siemens Heat Transfer Technology b.v., Netherlands for Heat Recovery Steam Generators
- Sumitomo SHI FW Energia Oy, Finland for Circulating Fluidized Bed Combustion (CFBC) Boilers up to 99.9 Mwe, Oil and Gas, Shop Assembled Water Tube Packaged Boilers up to 260 tonnes per hour, and Semi Dry Flue Gas Desulphurisation (FGD) Systems (Circulating Dry Scrubber Technology) for Unit sizes of 50 MWe and above
- Thermal Engineering International (TEi), U.S. for Screw Plug (Breech Lock) Heat Exchangers and Waste Heat Recovery through Process Waste Heat Boilers, Sulphur Condensers and Solar Thermal Heat Exchangers

== Quality, safety and environment ==
Over a period of eight decades, Isgec has been accredited by various standards organisations:

- ISO-9001:2015 (Quality Management System)
- ISO-14001: 2015 (Environment Management System)
- ISO-45001: 2018 (Occupational Health and Safety Management System)
- ISO 3834-2 2021 Certification
- ASME “U”, "U2", "S", "T", "PP" Certification
- National Board “R” Certification
- EU CE Marking Certification
- IBR & tIBR Approval
- EN 1090-1
- EU CE Compliant Steel Casting Certification
- UKCA Compliant Steel Casting Certification

== Joint ventures ==
- Isgec Heavy Engineering Limited, India and Hitachi Zosen Corporation, Japan have a joint venture – Isgec Hitachi Zosen Ltd. – for manufacturing specialized and critical process equipment. The new company has a shareholding pattern of 51% (Isgec) to 49% (Hitachi Zosen Corp.).
- A Joint Venture Company along with Amec Foster Wheeler North America Corp., U.S.A has been incorporated in the name of "Isgec Foster Wheeler Boilers" with a paid up capital of Rupees Two crore only.
- Isgec and TITAN Metal Fabricators create joint venture manufacturing operation.
- Isgec Heavy Engineering has formed a joint venture with Italy-based Redecam Group SpA.
