= TerraNet =

TerraNet or Terranet may refer to:

- TerraNet AB, a Swedish technology company designing peer-to-peer wireless technology
- Terranet ISP, an Internet Service Provider in Lebanon
- Terranet SRL, a Website Design and Development in Moldova
- Terranet, an internet-based land and property information service from Terralink International Ltd in New Zealand
- Teranet, a Canadian provider of land registry services for the province of Ontario and other related services
