= MyBinding =

American binding and laminating dealer

- Founded: 1998 Roots back to 1932 in Hillsboro, Oregon
- Area served: USA
- Products: Binding Machines & Supplies; Finishing Equipment; Laminating Machines & Supplies
- Website: https://www.mybinding.com/

MyBinding is one of the largest binding and laminating dealers in the United States, with over 90 years of industry experience.

== History ==
Established in 1998, with roots spanning back as far as 1932, MyBinding started as a small family-owned business in Hillsboro, Oregon. Co-founded by father and son duo Michael and Cory Ware.

The company began to find major success when a leader within the community, Jeff McRitchie, offered to build the team a website in 2004. The website proved pivotal in MyBinding’s growth leading Ritchie to become the Vice President of Marketing.

Over the years, MyBinding received recognition on the Inc. 5000 list of fastest-growing companies in the country in 2011, 2012, 2013, 2014, and 2016. The company saw 141% growth between 2009 and 2011, including $10 million in revenue in 2010, as well as passing the milestone of hiring its 50th employee.

In 2012, the company purchased a 68,000-square-foot facility in the Hawthorn Farm Industrial Park to support further growth, employee retention, and recruitment.

In 2019, the company was acquired by Spiral Binding, an industry leader that opened its doors in 1932. This further strengthened MyBinding’s national reach while expanding Spiral’s e-commerce capabilities. In 2020, strategic investments by Hilltop Private Capital bolstered MyBinding’s e-commerce presence and expanded its product portfolio to include broader print and finishing equipment and supplies.

Now, MyBinding operates a nationwide network of warehouses stocked with binding and laminating supplies along with pack and ship, paper handling, and print finishing essentials. Additionally, MyBinding has service technicians who provide support for equipment maintenance and repair.

== Partners ==
MyBinding is partnered with vendors such as Bindomatic, General Binding Corporation, and Coverbind to provide a diverse range of products. The company has distribution partnerships with ACCO Brands to enhance these offerings.

== External ==
- Official Website
