= Voice of the Ocean =

Foundation

Voice of the Ocean Foundation
- Formation: 2019
- Founder: Carl Douglas
- Type: Philanthropic foundation
- Locations: Stockholm, Sweden; Gothenburg, Sweden
- Website: https://voiceoftheocean.org/

Voice of the Ocean (often abbreviated to VOTO) is a Swedish foundation founded in 2019, whose purpose is to conduct, support, and promote ocean research and education and its dynamic processes and history. With a holistic approach, the foundation seeks to increase knowledge of the interactions between mankind and the sea over time and into the future.

Their sister organization, Midocean AB, handles maritime operations while VOTO specifies missions, instruments, and outreach.

== History ==
VOTO was founded in 2019 by Carl Douglas, a Swedish count, financier, and diver, following the recovery of a DC-3 airplane shot down over the Baltic Sea during the Catalina affair. As a diver, Douglas realized that the world's oceans were poorly understood and there was a disconnect between society and the sea.

In 2021, VOTO's sister company Midocean AB, ordered two research vessels from Finnish shipbuilder Kewatec for glider deployments and other scientific purposes in the Baltic Sea and Skagerrak. The two ships, named Ocean Seeker and Ocean Nomad, were delivered in 2023.

Between October 2022 and January 2023, VOTO was heavily involved in capturing environmental impacts of the Nord Stream explosions. Gliders were moved from existing locations in the Baltic Sea to cover north explosion site within the Bornholm basin, sensing for methane and other parameters.

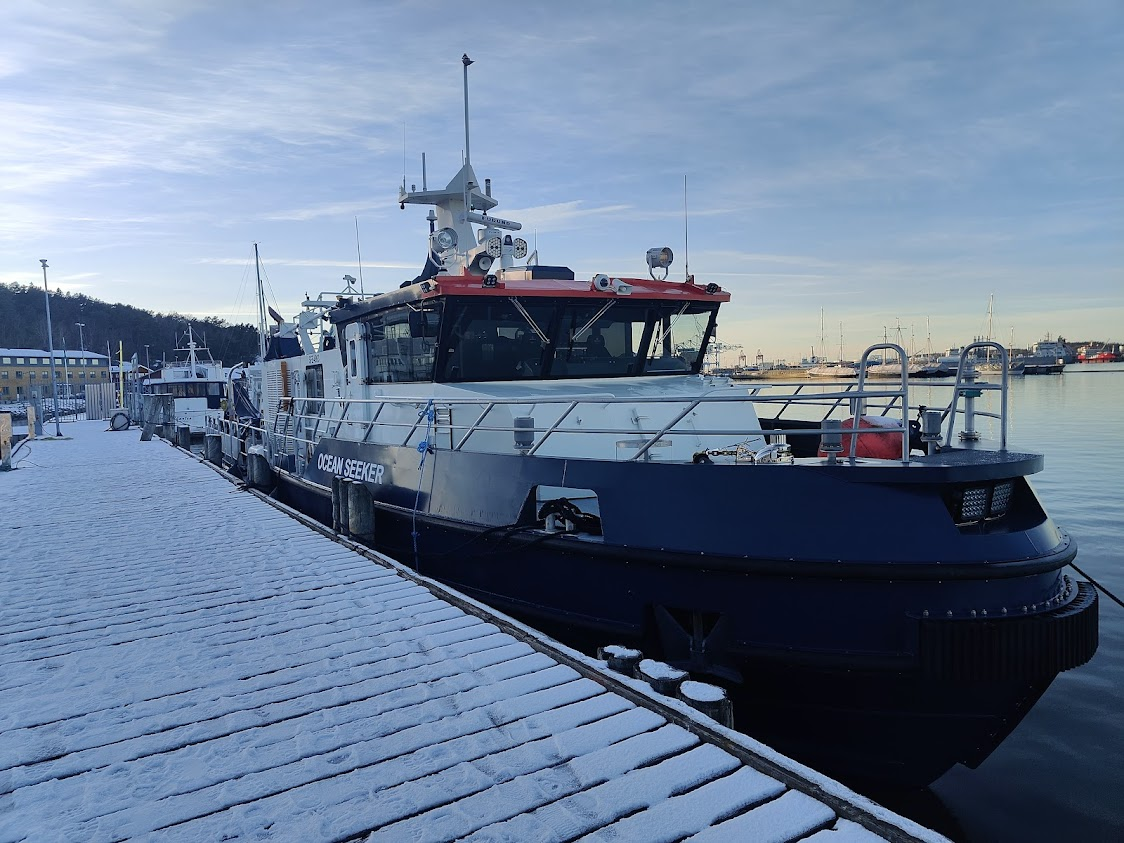
RV Ocean Seeker, acquired in 2023, at port in Gothenburg.

In 2024, VOTO established Ocean Books, an in-house publisher for nonfiction literature after years of collaboration with Swedish publisher Max Ström. In an interview, publisher head Jeppe Wikström outlined a goal of publishing 5-10 titles a year.

In May 2025, VOTO hosted ocean sensor manufacturer Rockland Scientific for an Ocean Microstructure Glider workshop at their location in Gothenburg.

In October 2025, VOTO made a major donation to the University of Gothenburg to purchase an underwater vehicle, seeking to replace the AUV "Ran", which was lost under an Antarctic glacier in 2024. Ran was used to take measurements under the Thwaites glacier for the first time.

At the end of 2025, VOTO was the recipient of French marine technology company ALSEAMAR's first shallow-water glider model for testing and development in Baltic. Increasing the endurance of a glider, in addition to the challenges of pronounced stratification in the Baltic, prompted research and development of a new model.

VOTO entered a partnership with Swedish investment company Latour to develop the IMAX documentary Ocean Dreams - Stories of Hope. The film is set to premiere in 2026.

== Mission ==
By providing unique data, research methods, and infrastructure, VOTO supports researchers in both oceanography and marine archaeology.

VOTO wants to spread knowledge about the ocean's multifaceted nature, culture, history, and offer new perspectives. The foundation wants to promote knowledge and collects marine data in both the Baltic Sea and the North Sea. The data is freely distributed through a portal called the Observations Portal.

VOTO seeks to increase ocean awareness in society, both among decision makers and the general public. Among other things, the foundation has produced multiple books about the ocean together with Lasse Åberg, with teacher's guides to give support for educators.
