= Taregh-class speedboat =

Iranian navy fast patrol boat

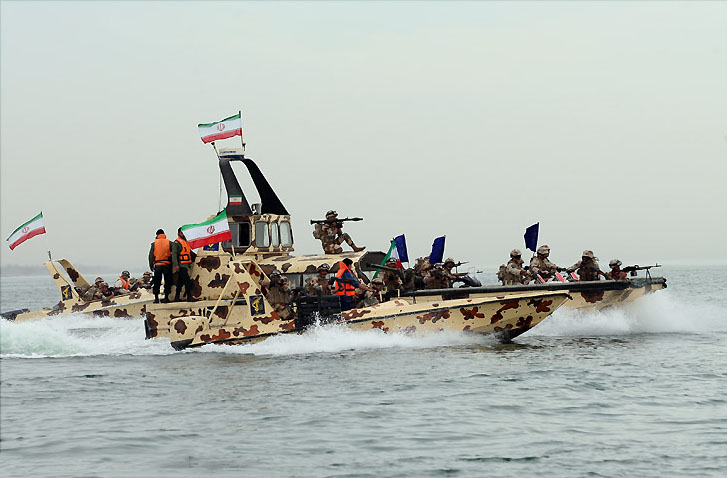

Class overview
- Builders: Boghammar Marin AB (original)
- Operators: Navy of the Islamic Revolutionary Guard Corps; Islamic Republic of Iran Navy
- In service: 1985–present
- Completed: 1984–1985 (first batch)

General characteristics
- Type: Fast patrol boat
- Displacement: 7 tons full load
- Length: 13 m (42 ft 8 in)
- Beam: 2.7 m (8 ft 10 in)
- Draught: 0.7 m (2 ft 4 in)
- Installed power: Diesel
- Propulsion: 2 × Seatek 6-4V-9 engines, 1,160 horsepower (0.87 MW); 2 × shafts
- Speed: 46 knots (85 km/h)
- Range: 500 nmi (930 km) at 46 kn (85 km/h)
- Complement: 6 (estimate)
- Sensors & processing systems: Surface search radar, I-band
- Armament: Various, including: 1 × RPG-7 rocket launcher; 3 × 12.7mm machine gun; 1 × 106mm recoilless rifle; 1 × 107mm 12-barelled MRL

The Taregh (Persian: طارق) is a class of fast patrol boat used by naval forces of Iran.

A Boghammar is a high-speed patrol boat for use in coastal patrol. The term Boghammar originated from the Iranian patrol boats manufactured by the Swedish company Boghammar Marin AB during the 1980s used in the Iran–Iraq War and its Tanker War.

== History ==
In 1983, Iran purchased 50 RL-118 and RL-130 patrol crafts from Boghammar Marin AB for reportedly $10 million. It was the biggest order ever for the shipyard, and was worth almost three times their annual revenues. By February 1987, The Washington Post reported that the newly established Navy of the Islamic Revolutionary Guard Corps began using the boats.

According to Svenska Dagbladet, American authorities maintained that Iran acquired at least a further 13 boats by way of Czechoslovakia.

== Wider use ==
The term boghammar, sometimes spelled boghammer, has also come to mean an improvised naval fighting vessel, typically used by a local irregular military force and usually being a modified civilian boat or other similar machine. It is usually a speedboat or fast patrol boat (as used by police for harbor/river patrol) on which are mounted recoilless rifles, heavy machine guns, mortars, or other relatively small weapons systems. A boghammar is usually unarmoured.

Boghammars, in this sense, have been used by paramilitary forces to attack offshore oil platforms and civilian shipping, or even larger military vessels, most notably by Iran in the Tanker War. Other users of such vessels include Nigerian militants, LTTE Sea Tigers, and Somali pirates.
