= Huawei Mate 9 =

Android-based smartphone developed by Huawei

- Manufacturer: Huawei
- Type: Smartphone
- Series: Huawei Mate
- First released: 3 November 2016; 10 years ago
- Predecessor: Huawei Mate 8
- Successor: Huawei Mate 10
- Compatible networks: 2G GSM/GPRS/EDGE – 850, 900, 1800, 1900 MHz 2G CDMA 1xRTT – 800, 850, 1900 MHz; 3G TD-SCDMA – Band 34/39; 3G UMTS – Bands 1/2/4/5/6/8/19; 3G CDMA2000 1xEV-DO– 4G LTE – Bands 1/2/3/4/5/7/8/9/12/17/18/19/20/26/28/29/38/40/41
- Form factor: Phablet
- Dimensions: 156.9 mm (6.18 in) H 78.9 mm (3.11 in) W 7.9 mm (0.31 in) D Porsche Design Edition; 152 mm (6.0 in) H 75 mm (3.0 in) W 7.5 mm (0.30 in) D
- Weight: 190 g (6.7 oz); 169 g (6.0 oz) (Porsche Design Edition)
- Operating system: Android 7.0 "Nougat" with Emotion UI 5.0 upgradable to Android 9 "Pie" with Emotion UI 9.1 and HarmonyOS 2 (China)
- System-on-chip: HiSilicon Kirin 960
- Memory: 4 GB RAM; 6 GB RAM (Chinese Edition and Porsche Design Edition)
- Storage: 32 GB (Chinese Edition); 64 GB; 128 GB (Chinese Edition); 256 GB (Porsche Design Edition) – UFS 2.1.
- Removable storage: microSD up to 256 GB (except Porsche Design Edition)
- Battery: 4,000 mAh Li-ion battery
- Rear camera: 20 MP + 12 MP
- Front camera: 8 MP
- Display: 5.9-inch 1080 x 1920 pixels IPS display, 16.7M colors 5.5-inch 1440 x 2560 pixels Curved AMOLED Display, 16.7M colors (Porsche Design Edition)
- Website: consumer.huawei.com/en/mobile-phones/mate9/index.htm

The Huawei Mate 9 is a high-end Android smartphone, designed and produced by Huawei as part of the Huawei Mate series. It was released on 3 November 2016. It was succeeded by the Huawei Mate 10 series, and later the Huawei Mate 20 series.

== Specifications ==
=== Hardware ===
The Mate 9 is a phablet with an all-metal body. It uses a 5.9-inch display with Full HD resolution (1920×1080 pixels) and sloping 2.5D shielded glass. The Mate 9 also included an FPC1025 fingerprint sensor, which is produced by Fingerprint Cards of Sweden. The fingerprint sensor uses a 4-level security system for speed and accuracy.

The Mate 9 has an octa-core HiSilicon Kirin 960 chipset, which features an ARM Cortex-A73/A53 Octa-core CPU and Mali G71 Octa-core GPU, which reduces power consumption by 15 percent. According to Huawei, the chipset is "the fastest [it has] built." It includes a 4000 mAh high-density battery with Huawei's SuperCharge technology, which allows 58 percent charge in half an hour and a full charge in 90 minutes. The battery provides the Mate 9 with over two days of battery life.

It supports GSM, UMTS, LTE-TDD, LTE-FDD networks (support bands vary by models). In some countries, the Dual SIM version is available. The Mate 9 supports Wi-Fi, GPS, Bluetooth and NFC.

The dual camera module is powered by Leica. The rear (main) camera is compounded with f/2.2 12-megapixel color camera and one f/2.2 20-megapixel monochrome camera, which lets users take two images together to produce an image with more detail. The monochrome lens can be used separately. It also includes "lossless zoom" and "4-in-1 hybrid focus", which allows users to zoom in on a subject without worrying about degrading the quality of the photo, and a combination of laser, phase detection, depth, and contrast focus. The Mate 9 also features 4K video and a front-facing 8 MP camera.

The Mate 9 comes in Space Gray, Moonlight Silver, Champagne Gold, Mocha Brown, Ceramic White and black (only available in China). It's equipped with 4 GB RAM, 64 GB ROM, and microSD support up to 256 GB. It also provides 4 GB+32 GB and 6 GB+128 GB versions. There is a mono SIM version with lower camera sensor.

Huawei also released the Porsche Design Limited Edition of Mate 9, which combines Porsche Design's signature aesthetic with Huawei's technology. It's equipped with 6 GB RAM, 256 GB ROM and a 5.5-inch curved AMOLED display, with WQHD resolution (2560×1440 pixels) and AMOLED technology. The edition is available in Graphite Black only.

=== Software ===
The Mate 9 is preloaded with Android 7.0 "Nougat" and Huawei's Emotion UI (EMUI) 5.0, which improves the system's performance over previous versions. In February 2017, the phone got Amazon Alexa support in the United States. The Mate 9 is the first phone to feature the optical flow-based video stabilization "Vidhance" from IMINT Image Intelligence AB.

In October 2017 Huawei launched a beta testing program for the EMUI 8.0 update, based on Android 8.0 Oreo. It began to roll out for customers in the United States on 31 January 2018.

== Release ==
The Mate 9 is available in the following first-wave launch markets: China, France, Germany, Italy, Japan, Kuwait, Malaysia, Poland, Saudi Arabia, Spain, Thailand, and United Arab Emirates. The Mate 9 is priced at €699, and the Porsche Design Limited Edition is priced at €1395.

== Reception ==
The Mate 9 has received generally positive reviews. In Tom's Guide, Sam Rutherford said "Huawei's Mate 9 is the kitchen sink of phones. You get a boatload of features, such as an IR blaster, clever stereo speakers, a fingerprint sensor, and a big, bright, 5.9-inch screen...it would still be the fastest Android phone on the market", while TechAdvisor said, "Huawei's Mate 9 has the potential to be the best in the Huawei line-up, boasting an impressively large battery alongside powerful internals, an improved dual-camera setup and a sleek, gorgeous design." Shaan Haider on Geeky Stuffs said, "Huawei Mate 9 is a great phone and score brilliantly in every aspect. It comes with a big and beautiful screen, great camera with additional features like a dedicated monochrome sensor, top quality fingerprint sensor, feature-rich and productive EMUI along with moderate battery life."
