= Swegon =

- Company type: Private
- Industry: Indoor climate, Ventilation
- Founded: 2005
- Headquarters: Gothenburg, Sweden
- Area served: Europe, USA, China, India, UAE and New Zealand
- Key people: Andreas Örje Wellstam (CEO)
- Products: Air handling units, Diffusers, Chilled Beams, Silencers, Dampers
- Revenue: 5.8 billion SEK (2021)
- Number of employees: 2700(2021)
- Website: Swegon.com

Swegon AB is a company which develops, manufactures and markets products and solutions in the field of indoor environment, offering solutions for ventilation, heating, cooling and climate optimisation, as well as connected services and expert technical support. Swegon is owned by the Investment AB Latour group. Including foreign sales companies, Swegon has a total of approximately 2700 employees and a turnover of approximately 5.8 billion SEK (2021).

Swegon has subsidiaries in and distributors all over the world and around 20 production plants in Europe, North America and India, together with other countries via partners.

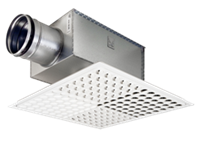
COLIBRI Disc Diffuser

== History ==
Swegon has its roots in Farex (1932) and Stifab (1974). The two companies merged in 1995 to become Stifab Farex. Stifab Farex and PM Luft merged in 2005 and became Swegon AB.

== Expansion ==
Swegon has its own sales companies in 16 countries and also operates through partners in over 40 countries, including Belgium, Denmark, UAE, Estonia, Finland, France, Italy, The Netherlands, Norway, Poland, Switzerland, Slovakia, Spain, United Kingdom, Sweden, Czech Republic, Germany, USA, Austria, Bosnia-Herzegovina, Bulgaria, Iceland, Israel, Kazakhstan, Croatia, Latvia, Lithuania, New Zealand, Portugal, Romania, Slovenia, Taiwan, Turkey, Ukraine, Hungary, China and India.

== Sources ==
- Swegon webpage: www.swegon.com
- Air Academy webpage: www.swegonairacademy.com
- Swegon brochures and presentations
- Investment AB Latour website: www.latour.se
