= On and Off =

On and Off may refer to:

- On & Off (TV series), a South Korean television program
- "On & Off" (Krista Siegfrids song), 2015
- "On and Off" (Maggie Rogers song), 2017
- On and Off, a 2007 album by Mary Halvorson
- "On and Off", a 1976 song by David Ruffin from Everything's Coming Up Love
- "On and Off", a 1981 song by Barbara Mason

== See also ==
- "Off & On", a 2011 song by Sophie Ellis-Bextor
- On-off (disambiguation)
