= Expert (company) =

Swiss consumer electronics retail chain

Expert International GmbH

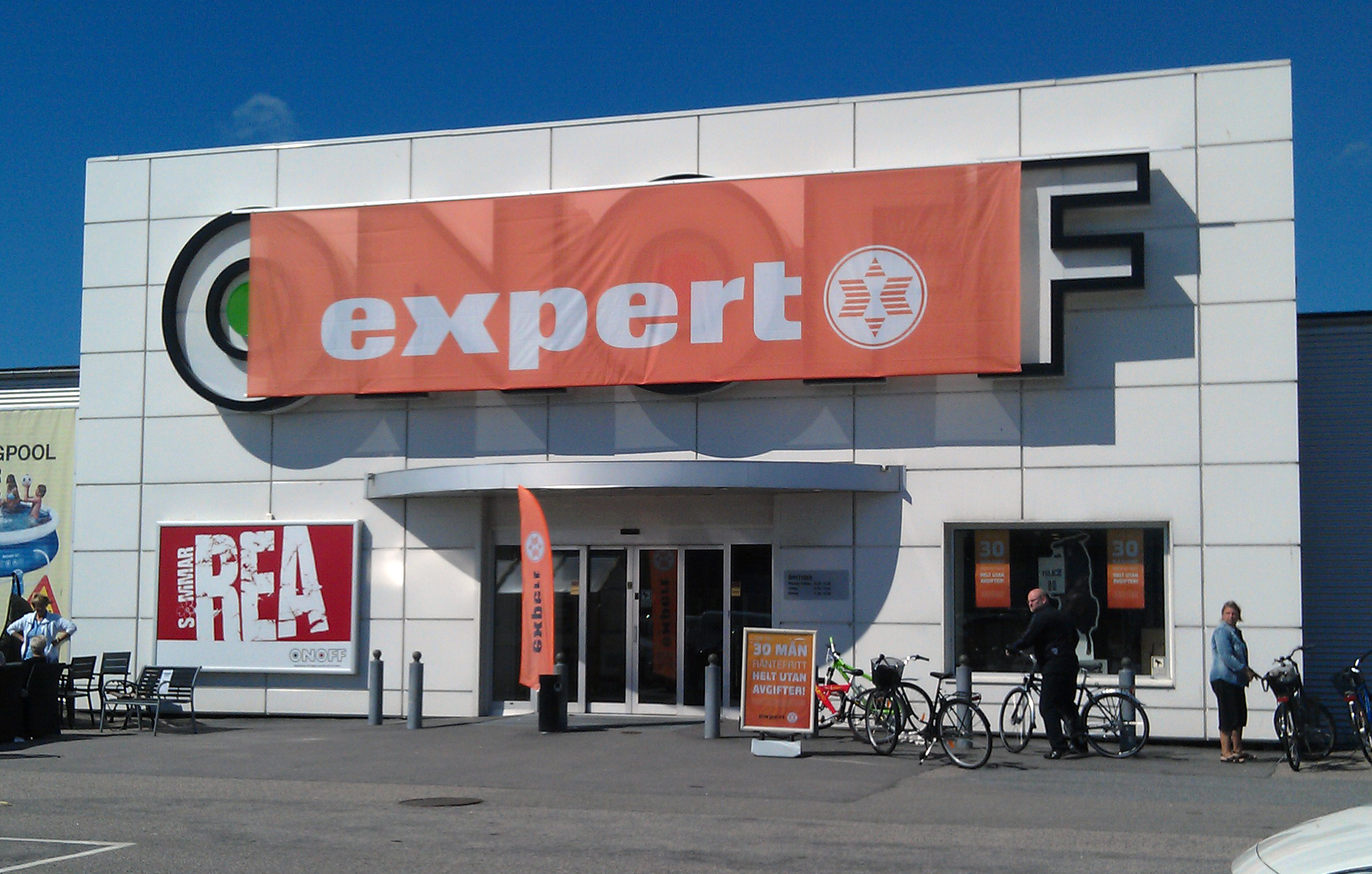
- Expert (formerly OnOff, the old sign is visible in the background) in Varberg, Halland, Sweden.
- Type: Private (GmbH)
- Industry: Retail
- Founded: 1967 (as Intercop GmbH), 1971 (current name)
- Headquarters: Zug, Switzerland
- Area served: Worldwide
- Products: Consumer electronics
- Website: www.expert.org

Expert International GmbH is a Swiss consumer electronics retail chain headquartered in Zug, Switzerland.

== History ==
The Intercop GmbH company was founded in Zurich, Switzerland on 16 October 1967 by initiative of Gunnar Nygren, representing the Swedish radio and TV retailer association Samex and representatives of five other national retail organizations. The company was renamed Expert International GmbH in 1971. Retailers from other countries began to join the group, which led to the Expert trademark being internationally registered.

In 1999 the Expert Global group was formed following a letter of intent being signed with Associated Volume Buyers Inc. from the United States and Cantrex from Canada. This collaboration was later ended.

== Operations ==
Expert International has over 5000 affiliated stores in 20 countries, trading both under the brand Expert and other strong national and regional retail banners:

- Austria
- Belgium
- Croatia
- Czech Republic
- Finland
- France
- Germany
- Greece
- Hungary
- Ireland
- Italy
- Netherlands
- Poland
- Portugal
- Slovakia
- South Africa
- Spain
- Switzerland

=== Past operations ===
- Estonia (Closed and out of business)(Järve Centre, Magistrali Centre in Tallinn)
- Denmark, Norway and Sweden (Now Power International AS)
