= Aptilo Networks =

Software company in Stockholm, Sweden

- Company type: Private
- Industry: Telecommunications
- Founded: September 2001
- Founder: Jan Sjonell; Jonas Lagerquist; Paul Mikkelsen; Per Knutsson; Torbjorn Ward; Ulf Stigberg
- Headquarters: Stockholm, Sweden
- Key people: CEO: Paul Mikkelsen; CFO: Ulf Stigberg
- Products: Mobile data offloading, Radius servers, AAA servers, Hotspot (Wi-Fi), PCRF servers, Wi-Fi
- Number of employees: 75+ (Q1 2012 Worldwide)
- Website: www.aptilo.com

Aptilo Networks was a company headquartered in Stockholm, Sweden, which produced and marketed software to manage mobile data and Wi-Fi services for 3G, LTE, WiMAX, Wi-Fi and fixed broadband networks, including for mobile data offloading using Wi-Fi. Aptilo's service management platform (a modern, high-performance and highly available AAA) controls billing, user services and access within the network. The company offered service management and policy control for both telephony network operators and Internet service providers.

In addition to its headquarters, Aptilo had regional offices in Kuala Lumpur, Dallas Texas and Dubai.

In 2020, Aptilo Networks was acquired by Enea Software and now operates as a section within the Network Solutions business unit of Enea.

== Products and services ==
Aptilo Networks is a supplier of telecommunication software for telecommunication operators including Wi-Fi and WiMAX service providers. The company's main product is the Aptilo ALE, an AAA that can be scaled up to millions of transactions per second and hundreds of millions of subscribers in the internal database. The ALE platform allows for a variety of use cases including policy control, Radius servers, AAA servers, Hotspot (Wi-Fi), PCRF servers, software for Wi-Fi calling in Evolved Packet Core networks and various 5G network functions.

== Awards ==
Aptilo Networks has received the following awards:

- Fierce Innovation Awards 2015 Winner – Traffic Offload Category
- Light Reading – Company of the Year (Private) 2014, Leading Lights Award

== History ==
In June 2001, Aptilo Networks was founded by members of the former management group for Axis Communications' Mobile Internet division and took over the Mobile Access Server product and its development. In October 2001, Aptilo Networks secured its first large Wi-Fi deployment at Copenhagen Airport. Aptilo has grown rapidly and currently has systems deployed in more than 70 countries by companies such as Hutchison 3G, TeliaSonera, Batelco, Telekom Malaysia and Telenor.

== Acquisitions ==
In January 2011, Aptilo acquired Service Factory, a division of Birdstep Technology.
