= IMINT Image Intelligence AB =

Swedish software company

Vidhance AB (formerly known as IMINT Image Intelligence AB)
- Type: Public
- Industry: Software, Image analysis
- Founded: 2007
- Headquarters: Uppsala, Sweden
- Area served: Worldwide
- Key people: Nils Hulth (CEO); Johan Qviberg (Chairman)
- Products: Software
- Website: vidhance.com

Vidhance AB, is a software company providing smartphone manufacturers with video analysis software with headquarters in Uppsala, Sweden.

== History ==
The company was founded in 2007 by Jakob Sandström (CTO) and Harald Klomp (CEO). In 2008, the private investment company Professionell Ägarstyrning i Sverige AB and Uppsala University holding company Uppsala Universitets Utvecklings AB invested in the company. Initially Imint focused on providing video analysis and optimizations to unmanned aerial systems.

On 6 April 2009, Imint was selected by Stockholm Innovation & Growth (STING) as one of the 26 hottest young technology companies in Sweden.

In 2010, the Swedish government venture capital firm Almi Invest joined as minority owners.

In 2012, Imint changed management, appointing Andreas Lifvendahl as CEO and Simon Mika as CTO. Under the new management Imint broadened to also include civil uses of unmanned aerial systems and even venturing into totally new markets.

In 2014, Vidhance Mobile was launched, initially featuring smartphone video stabilization. On 8 October 2014, Imint was awarded the Young Bulls Award in a ceremony in Barcelona, Spain. They also won the Young Bulls Award the 2015.

In December the 2015, after a public funding round that was more than seven times oversubscribed the company was listed on the micro cap list Aktietorget. During the first three hours of trading the share increased its value by 250%.

In 2023 Nils Hulth was appointed CEO of the company and the 29th of december 2023 Imint went through a name change and since the name of the company is the same as the product Vidhance.

== Products ==
At present, Vidhance has three main product categories on the market which each contains features for different stages of the video life-cycle. Besides the main features there are also Add-ons available for each product:

- Vidhance Capture – Vidhance Video Stabilization, Vidhance Dynamic Motion Blur Reduction, Vidhance Noise Reduction, Vidhance Time Lapse, Variable Lens Distortion Correction, Focal Breathing Correction
- Vidhance Composition – Live Composer (previously known as Live Auto Zoom), Smoother Selfie Mode
- Vidhance Post Process – Stabilization in post processing mode

== Available subfeatures (Add-ons) ==
- Vidhance Zoom
- Vidhance Live Tracker
- Object Tracking
- Slow Motion
- Live Composer
- OIS-compensation

== Multi-platform support ==
As announced by the company on 2 October 2018, Imint's camera- and video enhancing software now supports Android, Windows and Linux OS with version 3.0.

== Customers ==
=== Aerospace and Defence ===
Imint has in the past had several customers in the aerospace and defence industry. Among them are:

- Saab
- Kockums
- Elbit Systems
- BlueBird Aero
- Innocon

=== Smartphone manufacturers ===
Today Imint's software is present in around 55 million android-based smartphones from several manufactures. The following have been confirmed through firmware analysis and/or other channels:

- Huawei
  - Mate 9, Mate 9 Pro, Mate 9 Porsche
  - P10, P10 Plus
  - Honor 9
  - P20, P20 Pro, P20 Porsche
  - Honor View 10 (Through OTA-update)
  - Honor 10 (Through OTA-update)
  - Honor Play (Through OTA-update)
  - Mate 20, Mate 20 Pro, Mate 20 Porsche, Mate 20 X
- BQ
  - Aquaris X5 Plus
  - Aquaris X, Aquaris X Pro
- Wiko
  - Wim, Wim Lite
  - View, View XL
  - View Prime
  - View 2
  - View Pro
  - View 3 Pro
- Sharp
  - Aquos R
  - Aquos Sense
  - Aquos R Compact
  - Aquos R2
  - Aquos Zero
- Vivo
  - X20
  - X20 UD
  - X21
  - V11
  - V11 Pro
  - Z1
  - V15 Pro
- Xiaomi
  - Redmi Note 5 Pro
  - Mi Mix 2S
  - Mi 6X
  - Redmi S2/Y2
  - Mi 8, Mi 8 Pro, Mi 8 Explorer, Mi 8 Youth Edition
  - Redmi 6 Pro
  - Mi A2
  - Mi A2 lite
  - Mi Mix 3
  - Mi 9 (With Motion Tracking based on Live Composer, previously known as Live Auto Zoom)
  - Mi 9 SE
- General Mobile
  - GM 9 PRO
- Fujitsu Connected Technologies
  - Arrows BE F-04K
- Oppo, OnePlus and Realme
  - To be announced

== Future markets ==
=== Medical, Surveillance, Action Cameras, Drones and IoT (Internet of Things) ===
Besides Vidhance's current main market in the smartphone industry, the Vidhance team are also looking to apply their technology and expertise into new markets in the near future. As of 14 November 2017. the company announced a research collaboration with Swedish Kontigo Care and their advanced eHealth platform Previct®.

As stated on Vidhance's website, the company also got ambitions to enter markets for Surveillance, Action Cameras, Drones and IoT (Internet of Things)

== Offices ==
The company headquarters is based in Uppsala, Sweden, part of the Stockholm-Uppsala software technology corridor, a prominent software cluster.

Sales & support offices are also available in Shanghai, Singapore and Tokyo.
