= Boghammar Marin =

Swedish shipbuilding company

Boghammar Marin AB
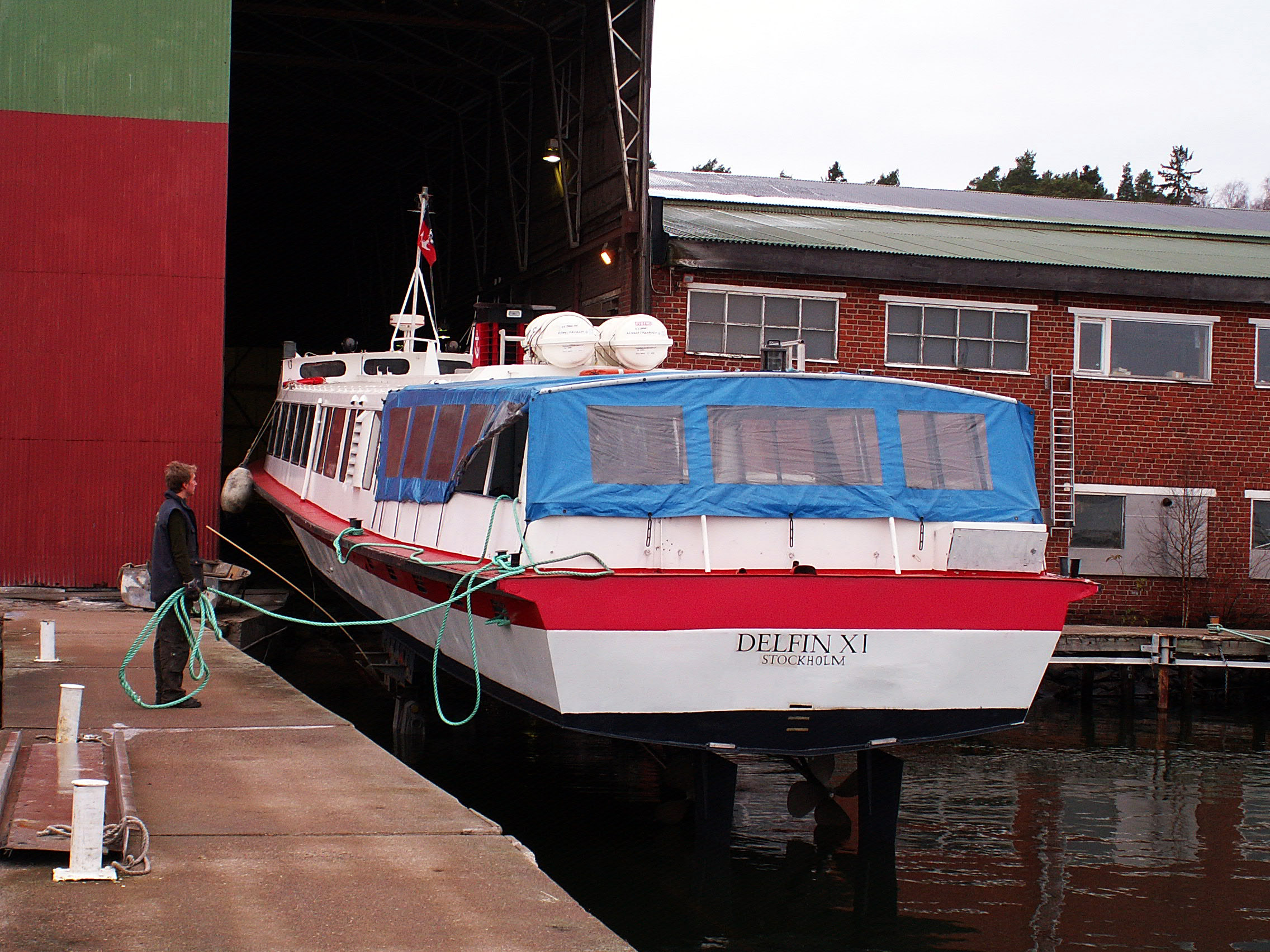
- Boghammar Marin launches passenger boat after repairs in 2005.
- Founded: 1906 as Gustafsson & Andersson
- Founders: Anders Gustafsson, Reinhold Andersson
- Headquarters: Lidingö, Sweden

Boghammar Marin AB is a small family-owned company on Lidingö, Sweden that specializes in the construction and building of aluminium boats like fast patrol boats, police boats, passenger vessels, sea fisheries/protection vessels and so on.

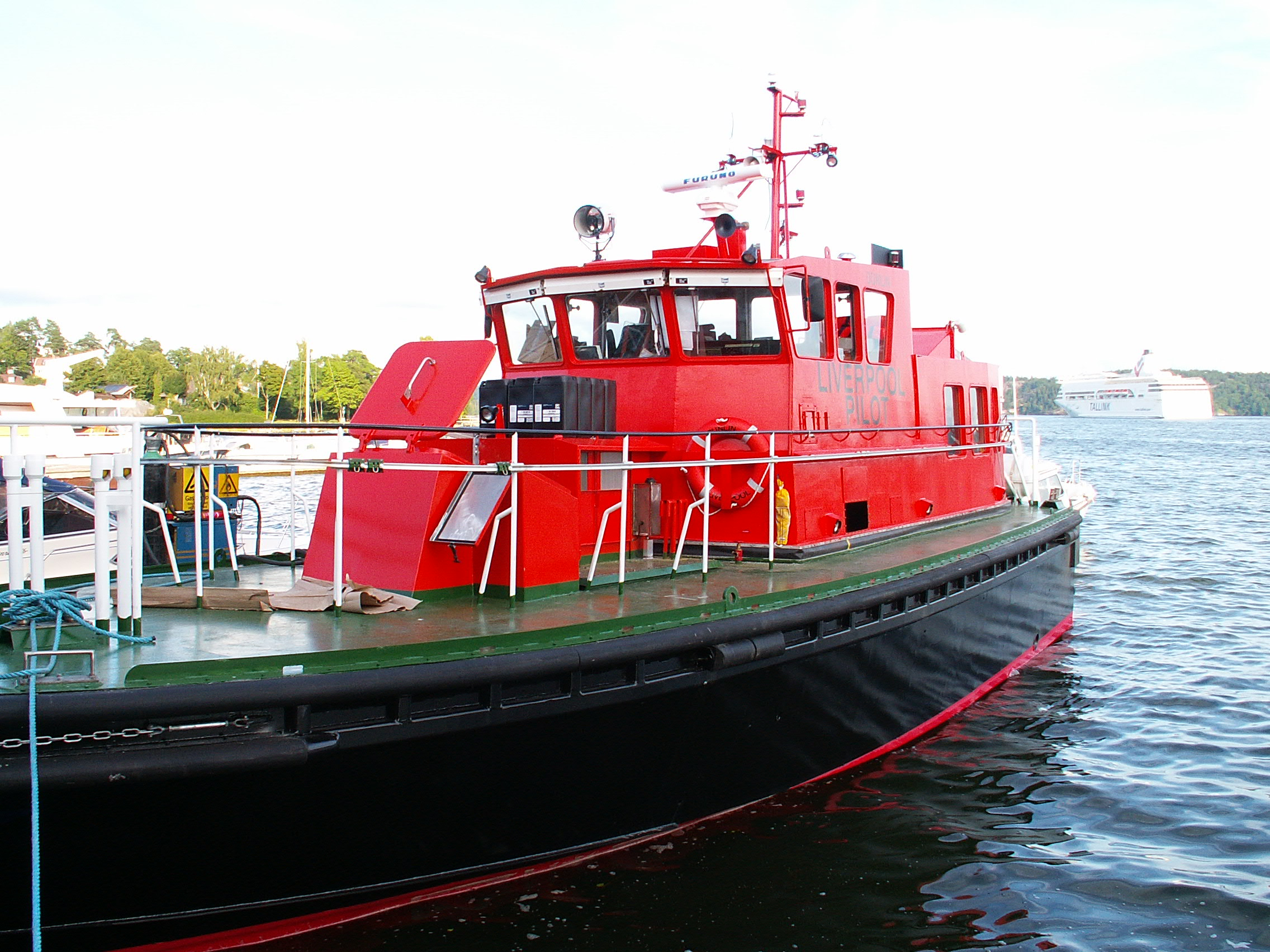
Newly constructed pilot boat for export to Liverpool, England in 2005.

The company was founded in 1906 by the brothers Anders Gustafsson and Reinhold Andersson as Gustafsson & Andersson and was until 1913 located in Stockholm. Since 1928 the company has made aluminium boats. They made boats under the trademark "Bogbåt" and they later adopted Boghammar as the family name. In the 1980s the company became internationally known when they built patrol boats for Iran. The boats were prepared to be fitted with weapons and became known as boghammars.
