= Nanoradio (company) =

Swedish company

Samsung Nanoradio Design Centre
- Industry: Wireless Semiconductors
- Founded: 2004
- Fate: Acquired by Samsung (2012)
- Headquarters: Kista, Sweden
- Key people: Pär Bergsten, Tord Wingren, Keith Cornell
- Products: Fabless semiconductor, connectivity chips
- Number of employees: 66 (as of 2011)
- Website: www.nanoradio.se

Nanoradio was a company based in Kista, Stockholm, Sweden. Nanoradio is a fabless semiconductor manufacturer with a main product line focus of connectivity products. The company is specializing in producing the smallest Wi-Fi chipsets by solution size on the market with extremely low power consumption. The company slogan is "Always On Wi-Fi". Was bought by Samsung in 2012.

== Company history ==
The company was founded in March 2004 as a “fabless” company.

== Operations ==
Nanoradio provides Wi-Fi products, adding high-speed wireless access in portable electronics, such as mobile phones, MIDS, cameras and headsets. Features include low power consumption, small size and support for audio applications. Nanoradio's Wi-Fi is ported to most cellular platforms and operating systems.

=== Products ===
- Wi-Fi chipsets for Mobile phones and Consumer electronics

== Offices ==
Nanoradio has its headquarters in Kista, Sweden. Moreover, the company has sales offices in five other countries.

- Kista, Stockholm, Sweden: Global Sales Office
- Seongnam, Gyeonggi-do, South Korea, Sales Office Korea
- Yokohama, Japan, Sales Office Japan
- Mountain View, California, United States, Sales Office USA, Premier Technical Sales Inc.
- Taipei, Taiwan, Sales Office Taiwan
- Shanghai, People's Republic of China, Sales Office China
- Patras, Greece, R&D
