= Swedish Meats =

Swedish meat company

Swedish Meats (known as Scan Farmek until 1 January 1999) was a company that provides the leading Swedish meat manufacturer Scan with animals for slaughter. The Swedish Meats association consists of 17,000 livestock farmers across Sweden.

The former chair of Swedish Meats, Lars Hultström, resigned from his position in November 2009 following an animal rights scandal. After visiting more than 100 pig farms in Sweden, the Animal Rights Alliance (Swedish: Djurrättsalliansen) claimed to have witnessed violations of Sweden's animal protection laws at almost every farm. One of the farms was Hultström's, where the group claimed to have recorded footage of pigs eating the carcass of a dead pig that had been left lying on the floor. Ulf Sahlin became the new chair of Swedish Meats following Hultström's resignation.
