= Onoff (Irish band) =

Irish punk rock band

Onoff, stylized as ONOFF, are a Rock Trio punk rock band from Dublin, Ireland currently located in California.

Onoff broke onto the Irish scene in 2002 with the release of their album, Hey Jack! You're Late!, which reached number 7 in Irish Tower Chart. Onoff had already played sold-out shows around Ireland prior to the album's release which included shows in the Ambassador Theatre.

Onoff's now-infamous live performances, which included getting fans on stage, fire-breathing finales, and even arriving on stage in coffins, landed them support slots with bands such as Fall Out Boy, Bad Religion, Funeral For a Friend and Therapy?, as well as a tour with Reel Big Fish.

In 2007, the band played two sold-out tours in Ireland for their new album, and a European tour with Dutch punk band De Heideroosjes.

October 2008 saw Onoff release 70,000 copies of their debut European album Don't Take Our Word For It which put them on the cover of two major German music magazines, Stardust magazine, and OX Fanzine. The release was supported by eight headline tours of Germany, Netherlands, Belgium, Austria, Switzerland and France, and a summer 2009 European Festival Tour. The album was received unanimously well across the European media with raving reviews right across the board.

In September 2009, the public voted Onoff as Best Unsigned Band in Irish Music Magazine HOTPRESS. Onoff won a headline slot on the LIVE STAGE at the 2009 HOTPRESS MUSIC SHOW at the R.D.S Dublin.

In 2013 the band relocated to America before the release of the video "Got That Feelin'", which was shot in Ireland in Dundalk, County Louth. After multiple appearances on prime time TV and extensive airplay on major radio stations. REBORN was the band's first US album release and in its entirety was written, recorded, and mixed in California. "Keep that Fire Burning" is the opening track from the album and was released in April 2017, and was accompanied by a video shot at the bands H.Q featuring fans and friends. "Don't Look Surprised" is another track from the album and was voted fifth most requested song of 2017 on California rock radio station, 98 Rock. "Hayley" was the next release from REBORN and was accompanied by a reel compilation video of 2018/19 tour, covering the band's festival sets at City of Trees, Concerts in the Park and First Fest.

2019 saw Onoff tour the United States' West Coast from Seattle to San Diego. Bottom of the Hill, Slims and Great America Music Hall, all in San Francisco, Whisky a GO-GO in Hollywood, Ace of Spades and Harlows, both in Sacramento. The band's last headline show of 2019 was at Harlow's, Sacramento.

In late 2019, Onoff collaborated with Da Bay Bully Dupree, a hip-hop artist from the San Francisco Bay Area, and recorded a track together in Fat Cat Studios in Sacramento. The track is called "Closer" and released on 20 April 2020. The track was showcased live at Concerts in the Park in Downtown Sacramento.

== Members ==
- Paulie O'Noff: lead guitarist and singer
- Stevie Ten Bears: drummer and cymbalist
- David Hurrell: bassist and backing vocals
- For larger festival shows, the band is accompanied by Brass to Mouth, a hired brass section

== Discography ==
=== Albums ===
- Hey Jack! You're Late! (2002)
- Don't Take Our Word For It (2008)
- Reborn (2017)

=== Singles ===
- Got That Feelin (2014)
- Waiting On You (2015)
- Two Blocks Away (2016)
- Keep That Fire Burning (2017)
- Closer (2020)
- Blah Blah Blah (2022)
- What Matters Most (2024)
- Left on the Moon (2024)

At a recent show, the band teased a brand new song that was set to release later in 2025, but as of 31 March 2026, it hasn't released yet.

== Videography ==
- Got That Feelin (2014)
- Waiting On You (2015)
- Two Blocks Away (2016)
- Keep That Fire burning (2017)
- Hayley (2017)
- Closer (2020)
- Blah Blah Blah (2022)
- What Matters Most (2024)
- Left On The Moon (2024)
