= NorthStar (battery company) =

Company that manufactures batteries

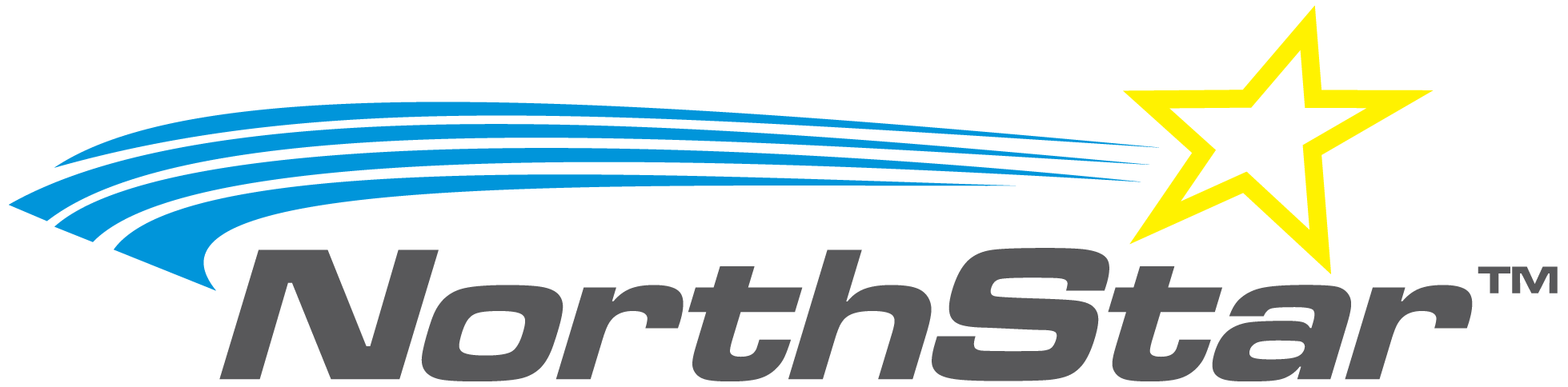
- Company type: Private
- Industry: Lead–acid battery Electronics
- Founded: 2000; 26 years ago
- Headquarters: Stockholm, Sweden
- Area served: Global
- Key people: Hans Lidén (CEO)
- Products: Lead–acid batteries Battery cabinets Electronics cabinets
- Number of employees: 700 (2011)
- Website: northstarbattery.com

NorthStar Battery Company (or simply NorthStar) is an international battery company which produces lead–acid batteries and battery cabinets. NorthStar's products are used in Telecom Power Systems, Uninterruptible Power Supplies and Engine Start applications. The headquarters of the parent company, NorthStar Group, is based in Stockholm, Sweden. NorthStar Group oversees two business units: NorthStar SiteTel, which produces battery cabinets, and is based in Sollentuna, Sweden; and NorthStar Battery, which produces lead–acid batteries, and is based in Missouri, United States. NorthStar also has offices in Shanghai and Shenzhen, China; and Nashik, India; as well as global distribution and service centers in Panama, Dubai and Singapore.

== History ==
NorthStar was founded in 2000. The company sells many of its products to international OEMs, such as Ericsson, Nokia Siemens Network and Huawei and is a member of the Advanced Lead-Acid Battery Consortium.

In January 2010, NorthStar entered a joint venture with Artheon Battery Company to manufacture a complete line of lead–acid batteries for the domestic battery markets in India and the export markets around the world.

In July 2010, NorthStar Battery Company built a second manufacturing plant, to increase manufacturing capacity from 1 million to 1.8 million batteries per year.

In November 2010, Exide announced a collaboration with NorthStar, to sell NorthStar engine start batteries under the Exide brand.

In 2016, NorthStar signed a $500 million deal with Daimler Trucks.

In 2019, EnerSys bought NorthStar from its previous owner, Altor Fund II. EnerSys subsequently began selling some former NorthStar battery products.
