= Adtraction =

Swedish marketing company

Adtraction Group AB
- Company type: Public (Aktiebolag)
- Traded as: Nasdaq Stockholm: ADTR
- ISIN: SE0016833149
- Industry: Affiliate marketing Partner Marketing
- Founded: 2007; 19 years ago
- Founders: Simon Gustafson, Markus Bjernvall
- Headquarters: Stockholm, Sweden
- Website: adtraction.com

Adtraction is a Swedish company in digital marketing, primarily partner marketing. The company was founded in 2007 by Simon Gustafson and Markus Bjernvall in Stockholm, Sweden. The company operates a platform that connects advertisers with partners – such as digital newspapers, influencers and price comparison sites – who, in exchange for commission, help advertisers increase their online sales.

== History ==
Adtraction grew gradually during the 2010s and established offices in several countries. As part of its growth strategy, the company acquired other affiliate networks: in 2020 the Swiss company Connects, in 2021 the Danish company Digital Advisor, and in January 2023 its competitor Adservice. In October 2024, the Swedish company Adrecord AB was acquired for 27 million SEK and in October 2025 the British company Affiliate Future was acquired from GlobalData plc.

Adtraction was listed on Nasdaq First North on 7 December 2021.

Before the IPO in 2021, a restructuring of ownership was carried out, which led to a dispute with the Swedish Tax Agency (Skatteverket) regarding re-taxation. The demands against the main owners, including CEO Simon Gustafson, were finally withdrawn in 2025.

== Operations ==
Adtraction operates in affiliate marketing, where advertisers only pay for marketing when it leads to actual purchases. The company provides a technical platform that connects advertisers with partners such as blogs, influencers and web portals. By the end of the third quarter of 2022, Adtraction had about 1,700 active advertisers and 7,500 active partners, which together generated around 1.5 million transactions.

In 2021, Adtraction had about 80 employees and net revenue of 698 million SEK.

== See also ==
- Tradedoubler
- Affiliate network
