= Onoff (retailer) =

Swedish electronics retailer

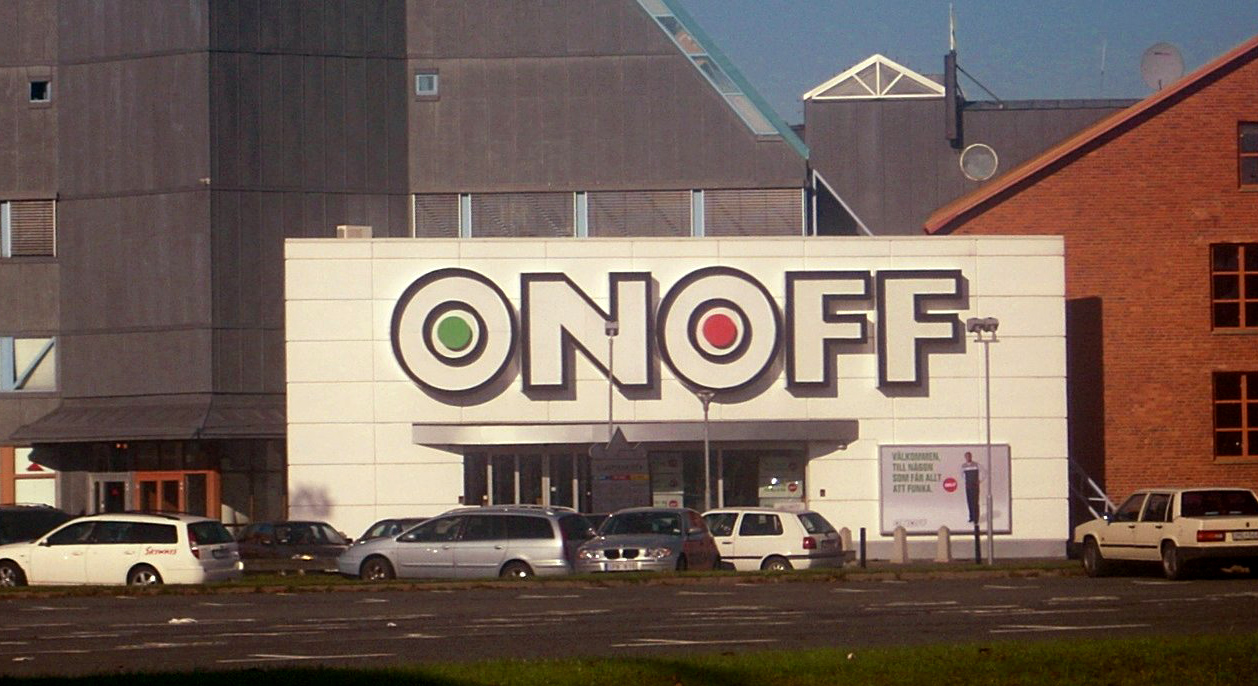
- Entrance of OnOff store in Jönköping in 2007
- Type: Joint-stock
- Industry: Retail
- Founded: 1971
- Defunct: 2011 (excluding stores in Estonia)
- Headquarters: Upplands Väsby, Sweden
- Key people: Hans Westin founder Sten Schröder chairman Petra Axdorff CEO
- Number of employees: 1200
- Website: onoff.se

Onoff (originally named Telecall) was a Swedish retail chain selling consumer electronics and major appliances. Founded in 1971, and later expanding into Finland and Estonia, the Swedish parent business went bankrupt in 2011, with some stores being purchased by rival chain Expert.

However, as of June 2018, the group's former Estonian subsidiary continued operating under the Onoff name following a management buyout in 2011, and operates to this day (2025).

== History ==
=== Early years ===
The business was started in 1971 by Hans Westin, who imported Japanese audio products, and in 1973 the company went full-time. The first actual store was opened in 1976 in Åkersberga.

The Onoff name was established in 1982 when the company - then known as Telecall - bought Sigges radio and changed its name to Onoff. In 1985, a head office was built in Upplands Väsby.

=== Finland and Estonia ===
In 2001, Onoff established operations and shops in Finland and Estonia.

A large part of Onoffs' revenue came from consumer finance business, Resursgruppen which they ran with SIBA. Resursgruppen operations included consumer credit and insurance when buying electronics via chain stores. In 2005, gains from this aspect of the business were greater than from the companies' sale of goods themselves.

=== Bankruptcy ===
On 11 July 2011 it was announced via press release that the company had filed for bankruptcy in the Attunda courthouse. Stores in Estonia were part of a subsidiary and not affected by the bankruptcy. The bankruptcy administrator announced that the entire company would be sold with the 6 stores in Estonia together with the 67 Swedish stores and a central warehouse. The Onoff brand was not included in the deal.

The group's Estonian subsidiary was purchased through a management buyout in 2011 and still continues to operate under the Onoff name as of June 2018.

On 20 July 2011, the Swedish operation of consumer electronics chain Expert announced they would buy 30 of the total 67 stores and the central warehouse. From 1 August 2011, these stores became part of the Expert chain. Expert estimated that, with this takeover they would have a market share in Sweden of about 12-13 percent. The Swedish Expert chain filed for bankruptcy on 18 September 2012.

== See also ==
- List of companies of Sweden
