= Mobile data offloading =

Data networking technique

Mobile data offloading is the use of complementary network technologies for delivering data originally targeted for cellular networks. Offloading reduces the amount of data being carried on the cellular bands, freeing bandwidth for other users. It is also used in situations where local cell reception may be poor, allowing the user to connect via wired services with better connectivity.

Rules triggering the mobile offloading action can be set by either an end-user (mobile subscriber) or an operator. The code operating on the rules resides in an end-user device, in a server, or is divided between the two. End users do data offloading for data service cost control and the availability of higher bandwidth. The main complementary network technologies used for mobile data offloading are Wi-Fi, femtocell and Integrated Mobile Broadcast. It is predicted that mobile data offloading will become a new industry segment due to the surge of mobile data traffic.

== Mobile data surge ==
Increasing need for offloading solutions is caused by the explosion of Internet data traffic, especially the growing portion of traffic going through mobile networks. This has been enabled by smartphone devices possessing Wi-Fi capabilities together with large screens and different Internet applications, from browsers to video and audio streaming applications. In addition to smart phones, laptops with 3G access capabilities are also seen as a major source of mobile data traffic. Additionally, Wi-Fi is typically much less costly to build than cellular networks. It has been estimated that the total Internet traffic would pass 235.7 Exabytes per month in 2021, up from 73.1 Exabytes per month in 2016. Annual growth rate of 50% is expected to continue and it will keep out phasing the respected revenue growth.

== Alternatives ==
Wi-Fi and femtocell technologies are the primary offload technologies used by the industry. In addition, WiMax and terrestrial networks (LAN) are also candidates for offloading of 3G mobile data. Femtocells use standard cellular radio technologies, thus any mobile device is capable of participating in the data offloading process, though some modification is needed to accommodate the different backhaul connection. On the other hand, cellular radio technologies are founded on the ability to do network planning within licensed spectrum. Hence, it may turn out to be difficult, both technically and business wise, to mass deploy femtocell access points. Self-Organizing Network (SON) is an emerging technology for tackling unplanned femtocell deployment (among other applications). Wi-Fi technology is different radio technology than cellular, but most Internet capable mobile devices now come with Wi-Fi capability. There are already millions of installed Wi-Fi networks mainly in congested areas such as airports, hotels and city centers and the number is growing rapidly. Wi-Fi networks are fragmented but recently there have been efforts to consolidate them. The consolidation of Wi-Fi networks is proceeding both through a community approach, Fon as the prime example, and by the consolidation of Wi-Fi network operators.

== Wi-Fi ==
Wi-Fi offloading is an emerging business domain with multiple companies entering to the market with proprietary solutions. As standardization has focused on degree of coupling between the cellular and Wi-Fi networks, the competing solutions can be classified based on the minimum needed level of network interworking. Besides standardization, research communities have been exploring more open and programmable design in order to fix the deployment dilemma. A further classification criterion is the initiator of the offloading procedure.

=== Cellular and Wi-Fi network interworking ===
Depending on the services to be offloaded and the business model there may be a need for interworking standardization. Standardization efforts have focused on specifying tightly or loose coupling between the cellular and the Wi-Fi networks, especially in a network-controlled manner. 3GPP based Enhanced Generic Access Network () architecture applies tight coupling as it specifies rerouting of cellular network signaling through Wi-Fi access networks. Wi-Fi is considered to be a non-3GPP WLAN radio access network (RAN). 3GPP has also specified an alternative loosely coupled solution for Wi-Fi. The approach is called Interworking Wireless LAN (IWLAN) architecture and it is a solution to transfer IP data between a mobile device and operator's core network through a Wi-Fi access. In the IWLAN architecture, a mobile device opens a VPN/IPsec tunnel from the device to the dedicated IWLAN server in the operator's core network to provide the user either an access to the operator's walled-garden services or to a gateway to the public Internet. With loose coupling between the networks the only integration and interworking point is the common authentication architecture.

The most straightforward way to offload data to the Wi-Fi networks is to have a direct connection to the public Internet. This no coupling alternative omits the need for interworking standardization. For majority of the web traffic there is no added value to route the data through the operator core network. In this case the offloading can simply be carried out by switching the IP traffic to use the Wi-Fi connection in mobile client instead of the cellular data connection. In this approach the two networks are in practice totally separated and network selection is done by a client application. Studies show that significant amount of data can be offloaded in this manner to Wi-Fi networks even when users are mobile.

However, offloading does not always mean reduction of resource consumption (required system capacity) in the network of the operator. Under certain conditions and due to an increase of the burstiness of the non-offloaded traffic (i.e. traffic that eventually reaches the network of the operator in a regular way), the amount of network resources to offer a given level of QoS is increased. In this context, the distribution of offloading periods turns out to be the main design parameter to deploy effective offloading strategies in the network of MNOs making non-offloaded traffic less heavy-tailed, hence reducing the resources needed in the network of the operator.. The energy consumption in offloading is also another concern.

=== Initiation of offloading procedure ===
There are two main approaches to the initiation of Wi-Fi offloading: user-initiated and operator-initiated offloading. In user-initiated offloading, the mobile user selects the network to use. In operator-initiated offloading, a connection manager in the mobile device connects to the mobile operator's server and retrieves the operator's policy to initiate the offloading procedure.

=== ANDSF ===
Access network discovery and selection function (ANDSF) is the most complete 3GPP approach to date for controlling offloading between 3GPP and non-3GPP access networks (such as Wi-Fi). The purpose of the ANDSF is to assist user devices to discover access networks in their vicinity and to provide rules (policies) to prioritize and manage connections to all networks.

=== ATSSS ===
3GPP has started to standardize the Access Traffic Steering, Switching & Splitting (ATSSS) function to enable 5G devices to use different types of access networks, including Wi-Fi. The ATSSS service leverages the Multipath TCP protocol to enable 5G devices to simultaneously utilize different access networks. Experience with the utilisation of Multipath TCP on iPhones has shown that the ability to simultanesouly use Wi-Fi and cellular was key to provide support seamless handovers. The first version of the ATSSS specification leverages the 0-rtt convert protocol developed within the IETF. A prototype implementation of this service has been demonstrated in August 2019.

=== Operating system connection manager ===
Many operating systems provide a connection manager that can automatically switch to Wi-Fi network if the connection manager detects a known Wi-Fi network. Such functionality can be found from most modern operating systems (for example from all Windows versions beginning from XP SP3, Ubuntu, Nokia N900, Android and Apple iPhone). The connection managers use various heuristics to detect the best performing network connections. These include performing DNS requests for known names over the newly activated network interfaces, sending queries to specific servers, ... When both the Wi-Fi and the cellular interfaces are activate, Android smartphones will usually prefer the Wi-Fi one since it is usually unmetered. When such a smartphone decides to switch from one interface to another, all the active TCP connections need to be reestablished.

Multipath TCP solves this handover problem in a clean way. With Multipath TCP, TCP connections can use both the Wi-Fi interface and the cellular one during the handover. This means that ongoing TCP connections are not stopped when the smartphone decides to switch from one network to another. As of January 2020, Multipath TCP is natively supported on iPhones, but less frequently used on Android smartphones except in South Korea. On iPhones since iOS9, the Wi-Fi Assist subsystem monitors the quality of the underlying network connection. If the quality drops below a given threshold, Wi-Fi Assist may decide to move established Multipath TCP connections to another interface. Initially, this feature was used for the Siri application. Since iOS12, any [Multipath TCP] enabled application can benefit from this feature. Since iOS13, Apple Maps and Apple Music can also be offloaded from Wi-Fi to cellular and vice versa without any interruption.

== Opportunistic offloading ==
With the increasing availability of inter-device networks (e.g. Bluetooth or WifiDirect) there is also the possibility of offloading delay tolerant data to the ad hoc network layer. In this case, the delay tolerant data is sent to only a subset of data receivers via the 3G network, with the rest forwarded between devices in the ad hoc layer in a multi-hop fashion. As a result, the traffic on the cellular network is reduced, or gets shifted to inter-device networks.

== See also ==
- LTE in unlicensed spectrum
- Generic Access Network
