= Dataphone =

Dataphone Scandinavia AB
- Industry: Telecommunications
- Founded: 2001
- Headquarters: Stockholm, Sweden
- Website: www.ip-only.se

Dataphone Scandinavia AB is a Swedish national and independent telecom operator and ISP that offers data communication solutions to businesses. Dataphone has its own national network for data and telephony.

The data network produces IP VPN over MPLS and Internet access. Dataphone delivers PSTN telephony and IP-telephony through its own network. The network also allows Dataphone to offer wholesale and carrier services to other national and international operators. Dataphone also provides collocation and hosting from its server facilities in Stockholm, Sweden. Additional offerings include antispam from IronPort, web hotel, e-mail services and more. The company's headquarters are in Stockholm, Sweden.

== History ==
Dataphone Sweden AB was founded in 1994 and was one of the pioneers of Internet services. Since then Dataphone has been an ISP and offered related services. Citylink AB was founded in 2001 and offered telephony and data communication based on a national powerful network and switch. The two companies merged in December 2005 under the name Dataphone Scandinavia AB. The official name is now DPH Scandinavia but the brand Dataphone is still used. Since December 2009 the company is a part of IP-Only Telecommunication AB.
