= Kungsörnen =

Swedish food manufacturer

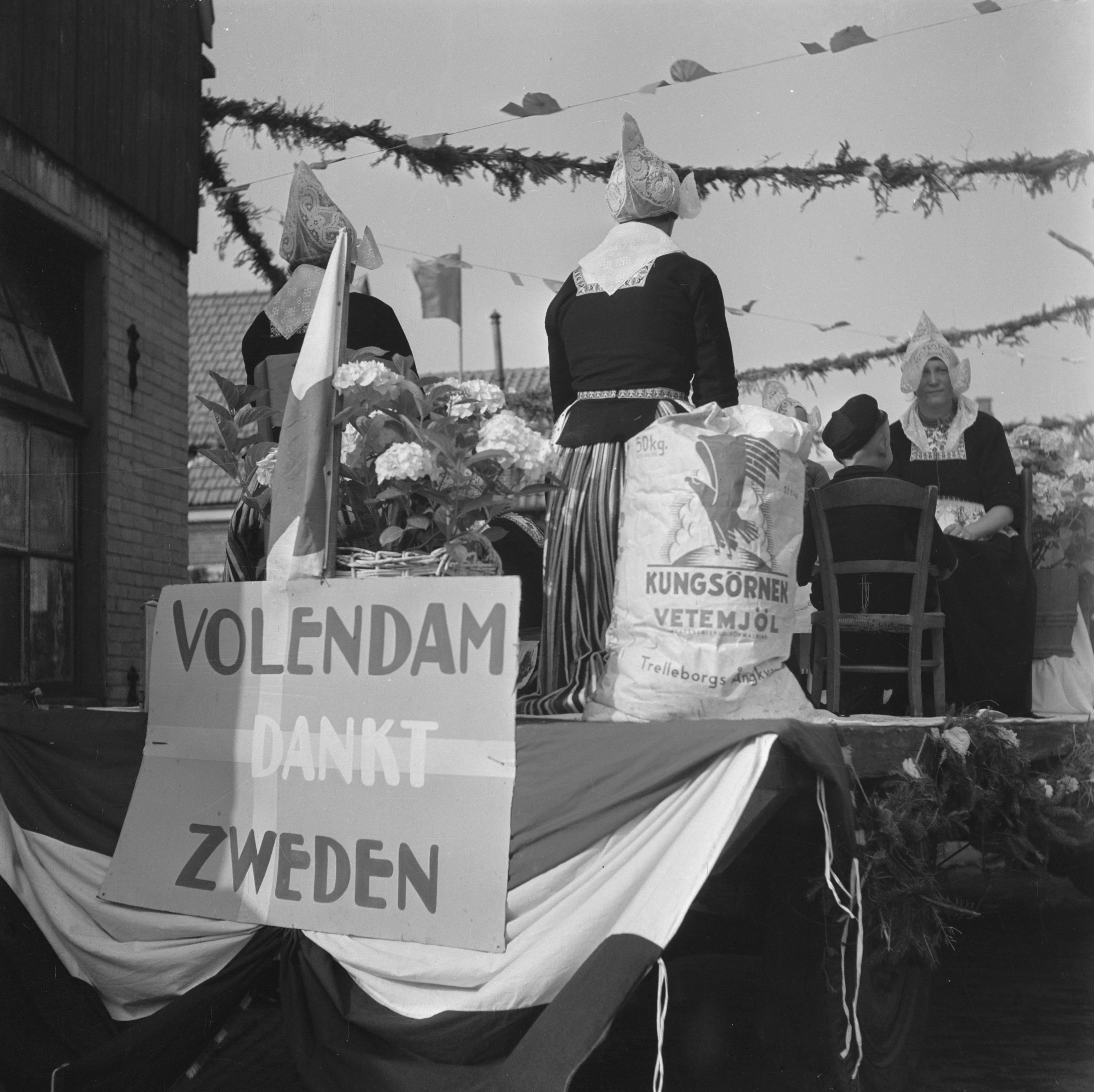
A bag of 50 kg Kungsörnen flour.

Kungsörnen is a Swedish manufacturer of food. It was founded in 1929 in Skåne. The company began by manufacturing flour. The company is owned by Lantmännen. The company's headquarters is a pasta factory located in Järna, just outside Stockholm.

Kungsörnen bought Bageri Skogaholm in 1974 and Korvbrödsbagarn in 1979.
