= Praktikertjänst =

Praktikertjänst Aktiebolag
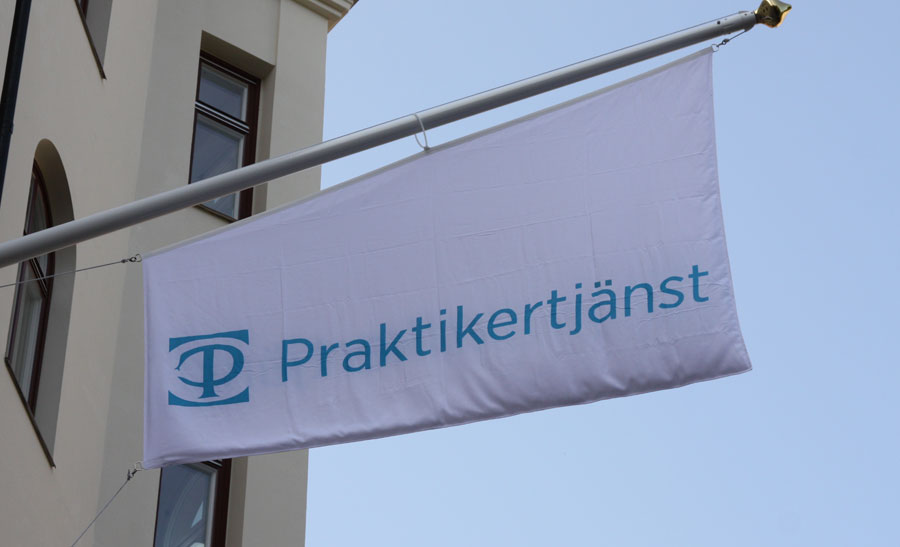
- Type: Publicly traded Aktiebolag
- Industry: Health care, dental care
- Founded: 1977 by Läkartjänst, Tandläkartjänst, Sjukgymnasttjänst, Delabgruppen
- Headquarters: Stockholm, Sweden
- Area served: Sweden
- Key people: Urban Englund; Chairman of the board Carina Olson; CEO
- Revenue: SEK 10,5 billion (2025)
- Number of employees: 7,200 – 2025
- Subsidiaries: BB Stockholm, BB Sophia, Cityakuten i Praktikertjänst AB, Medicinsk röntgen AB, Praktikerinvest AB, Praktikerinvest PE AB, Praktikertjänst Fastigheter AB, Praktikertjänst Försäkring AB, Praktikertjänst Geriatrik AB, Praktikertjänst Primärvård AB, Praktikertjänst Psykiatri AB, Rehab Station Stockholm AB, Ryggkirurgiska kliniken i Strängnäs AB, Scandinavian Venous Centre AB, Skyclinic Praktikertjanst AB, Stockholm Heart Center AB
- Website: Praktikertjanst.se
- Footnotes; Numbers from year 2014's financial statement.

Praktikertjänst Aktiebolag is a Swedish company, specialising in health and dental care.

The business idea has a cooperative framework, which means that every individual who wants to purchase shares in the company has to be the head of a clinic in the concern. Most of the administration and quality assurance, support and advisory is done centrally, whilst the health care service is done in the local clinics.

Praktikertjänst is the biggest private health and dental care company in Sweden; it has a turnover of 9.97 billion Swedish kronor and 9,269 employees.
