= Lantmännen =

Swedish agricultural cooperative

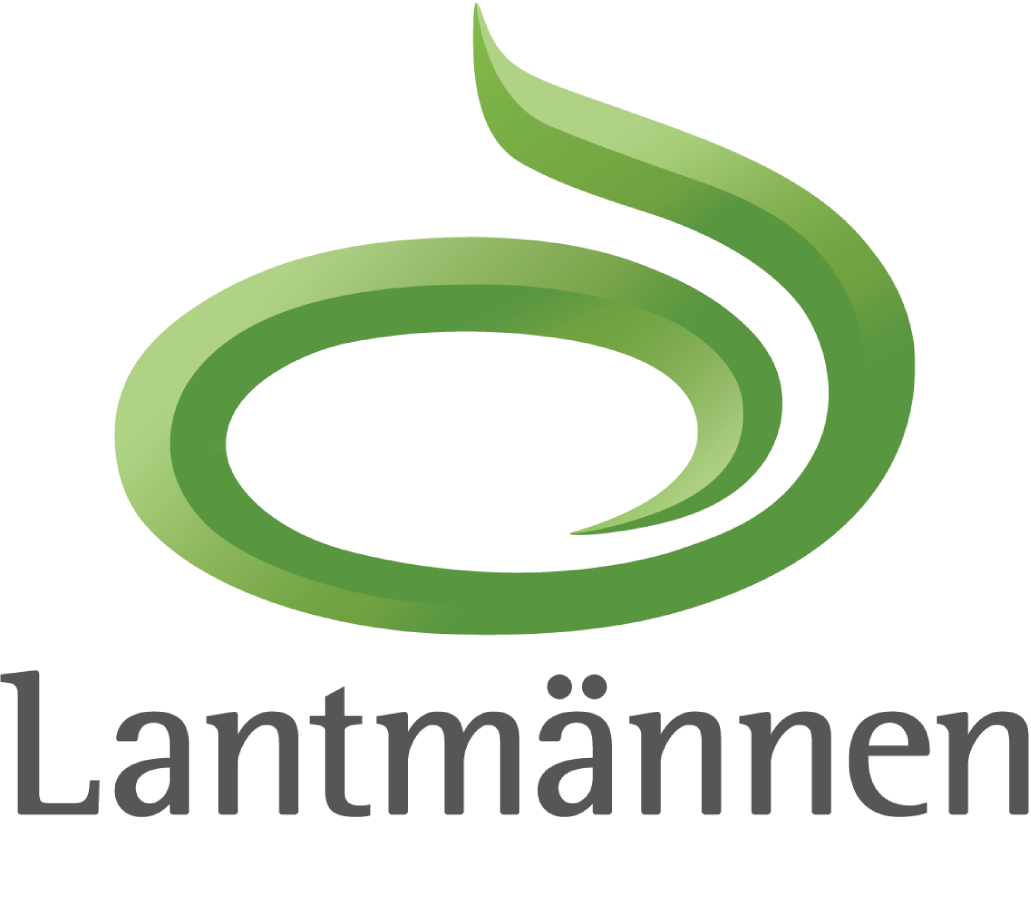
- Type: Agricultural cooperative
- Founded: 2001
- Headquarters: Stockholm, Sweden
- Key people: Magnus Kagevik (Group President CEO)
- Revenue: ~18 billion SEK (2024)
- Owner: 19 000 farmers
- Number of employees: ~10 000
- Website: lantmannen.com

Lantmännen (Swedish for 'farmers', literally 'land/rural men') is a Swedish agricultural cooperative owned by 19,000 Swedish farmers. Lantmännen has 10,000 employees, with operations in over 20 countries and an annual turnover of SEK 18 billion (approximately EUR 6.2 billion).

The cooperative owns several food brands, such as AXA, Kungsörnen, START!, Finn Crisp, Amo, Vaasan, Myllyn Paras, Bonjour, Hatting, Korvbrödsbagarn, and Scan.

== Acquisitions ==
In December 2023, Lantmännen announced the acquisition of HKScan's Swedish operations, including the brands Scan, Pärsons, and Bullens. The transaction was approved by relevant authorities in early 2024. This acquired Lantmännen all of the Swedish subsidiaries, personnel, and production facilities previously managed by HKScan Sweden AB.

In September 2024, Lantmännen acquired Entrack, a supplier of wear parts and undercarriage components for construction and agricultural machinery. Entrack operates internationally in Sweden, Finland, Poland, and Italy.

In August 2025, Lantmännen agreed to acquire Leipurin, a supplier of ingredients to bakeries and the food industry, from Finnish Aspo Plc. The acquisition was to encompass Leipurin’s operations in Sweden, Finland, Estonia, Latvia, and Lithuania, with Leipurin employing around 160 people and generating an annual turnover of SEK 1.5 billion. This was anticipated to occur in 2026, with Leipurin set to operate as an independent business unit within Lantmännen’s Energy Division.

== See also ==
- Kungsörnen
