= Specma =

Swedish Manufacturing Company

- Company type: Private
- Genre: Mechanics
- Founded: 1918
- Headquarters: Gothenburg, Sweden
- Parent: Schouw & Co., Denmark

Specma is a company in Sweden. It is one of Sweden's biggest producers of gaskets and seals for Swedish industry.

== History ==
The company was founded in 1918. It was known as Specialmaskiner AB, hence the shortened name Specma.

Specma was acquired by the Danish group Schouw & Co. in January 2016, and in April 2022 it was consolidated into Hydra-Grene (also owned by Schouw & Co.) for a consideration of 650 million Danish Krone.

In 2019 the company opened a further 7000 square metre manufacturing facility in Stargard, Poland.
