= AP&T =

Swedish industrial company

AP&T AB
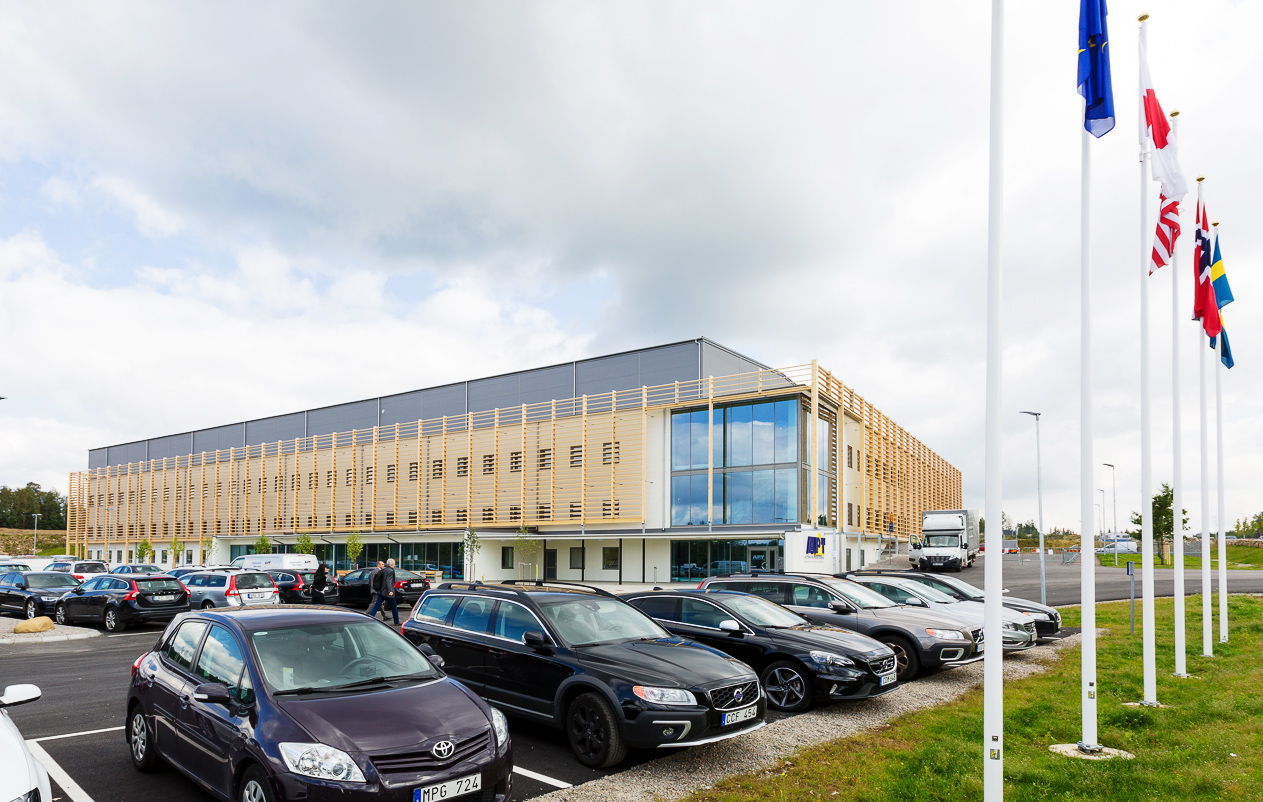
- AP&T Headquarters in Ulricehamn, Sweden.
- Company type: AB
- Industry: Manufacturing & Industry: Machine tools
- Founded: 1989 in Tranemo, Sweden
- Headquarters: Ulricehamn, Sweden
- Area served: Europe, Asia, North & South America
- Key people: Michael Jonson, Chairman; Magnus Baarman, CEO and Managing Director
- Products: Production Lines, Automation, Presses and Tooling
- Brands: NORDA S.p.A.
- Owner: Fairford Group
- Number of employees: 445 (2015)
- Website: aptgroup.com

AP&T AB is an industrial enterprise active in the sheet metal forming industry. It is the parent company of the AP&T Group. The company develops and manufactures complete production systems, automation equipment, presses, tools and services for companies that produce pressed sheet metal parts. Customers are active in the automotive industry and as manufacturers of heat exchangers, ventilation products and roof drainage products. AP&T is headquartered in Ulricehamn, Sweden with production facilities in Ulricehamn, Tranemo and Brescia, Italy through its subsidiary NORDA S.p.A.

== History ==
AP&T's roots go back to the early 1960s when two of the three companies forming the basis of AP&T were founded.

=== Lagan Press ===
Bertil Åberg began manufacturing hydraulic presses at his new company Lagan Press in 1963. This enabled him to quickly produce spare parts and styling accessories for the American cars he had formerly imported and sold. He opted not to use mechanical presses because they would make the parts too expensive. Bertil Åberg considered hydraulic presses from Germany, but decided that they were too expensive and complicated. These were the factors underlying Åberg's decision to manufacture his own presses.

=== VIBAB ===
At the same time in the early 1960s, Stig Gunnarson and Janne Merlander founded a small-scale machine shop in Blidsberg. The initial products they produced were rod cutting machines and press tools for various industries. The business, which was initially housed in an old hen house, would later become a successful tool manufacturer called VIBAB (Verktygsindustri i Blidsberg AB).

=== Tranemo Hydraulmaskiner ===
Two employees at Lagan Press, Håkan Sallander and Bertil Jonsson, had some ideas about how to achieve more stable hydraulic presses that could perform more operations on the same press table. The company's managing director, Bertil Åberg, was not receptive to their idea, however, so the enterprising employees founded a competing business – Tranemo Hydraulmaskiner – in 1970. The three companies became important in the Swedish sheet metal forming market, and all three of them developed automation products in parallel.

=== Three companies become one ===
Bertil Åberg sold Lagan Press at the beginning of the 1980s, and it became part of ASEA after a few more years (currently ABB). At this time all three companies, Lagan Press, Tranemo Hydraulmaskiner and VIBAB, were only active locally in the Swedish market.

When the three companies decided to merge into one in 1989 they could venture out into the export market together and offer complete solutions.

=== Global expansion ===
AP&T's sales tripled in the 1990s. The company founded its own sales and service companies in Germany, the US and Denmark. NORDA, an Italian company, was acquired in 1991, and Talent AB was added in 1994. AP&T founded sales and service companies in 2001 in the United Kingdom and Japan, and the company has been represented in Poland with its own sales and service company since 2007. Its presence in Asia was further reinforced in 2009 when AP&T founded a sales and service company in Shanghai, China.

The company celebrated 50 years of operations in 2014, and is currently represented on three continents.

== AP&T year by year ==
1964	Lagan Press formed
1964	VIBAB formed
1970	Tranemo Hydraulmaskiner formed
1989	AP&T formed; Roger Ankarbranth named managing director of the company
1989	AP&T Vertriebs-GmbH formed; sales and service company in Germany
1991	AP&T North America Inc. formed; sales and service company in the USA
1991	Acquisition of Norda S.p.A., an Italian company
1992	Tord Andersson named new managing director
1994	AP&T Danmark A/S formed; sales and service company in Denmark
1994	Acquisition of Talent, a Swedish company
2001	AP&T UK formed; sales and service company in the UK
2001	AP&T KK formed; sales and service company in Japan
2007	AP&T Polska Sp. z.o.o. formed; sales and service company in Poland
2009	AP&T Shanghai Ltd. formed; sales and service company in China
2009	AP&T obtains new principal owner: Fairford Group
2013	Magnus Baarman named new CEO and managing director
2014	Inauguration of new production facility and headquarters in Ulricehamn

== Operations ==
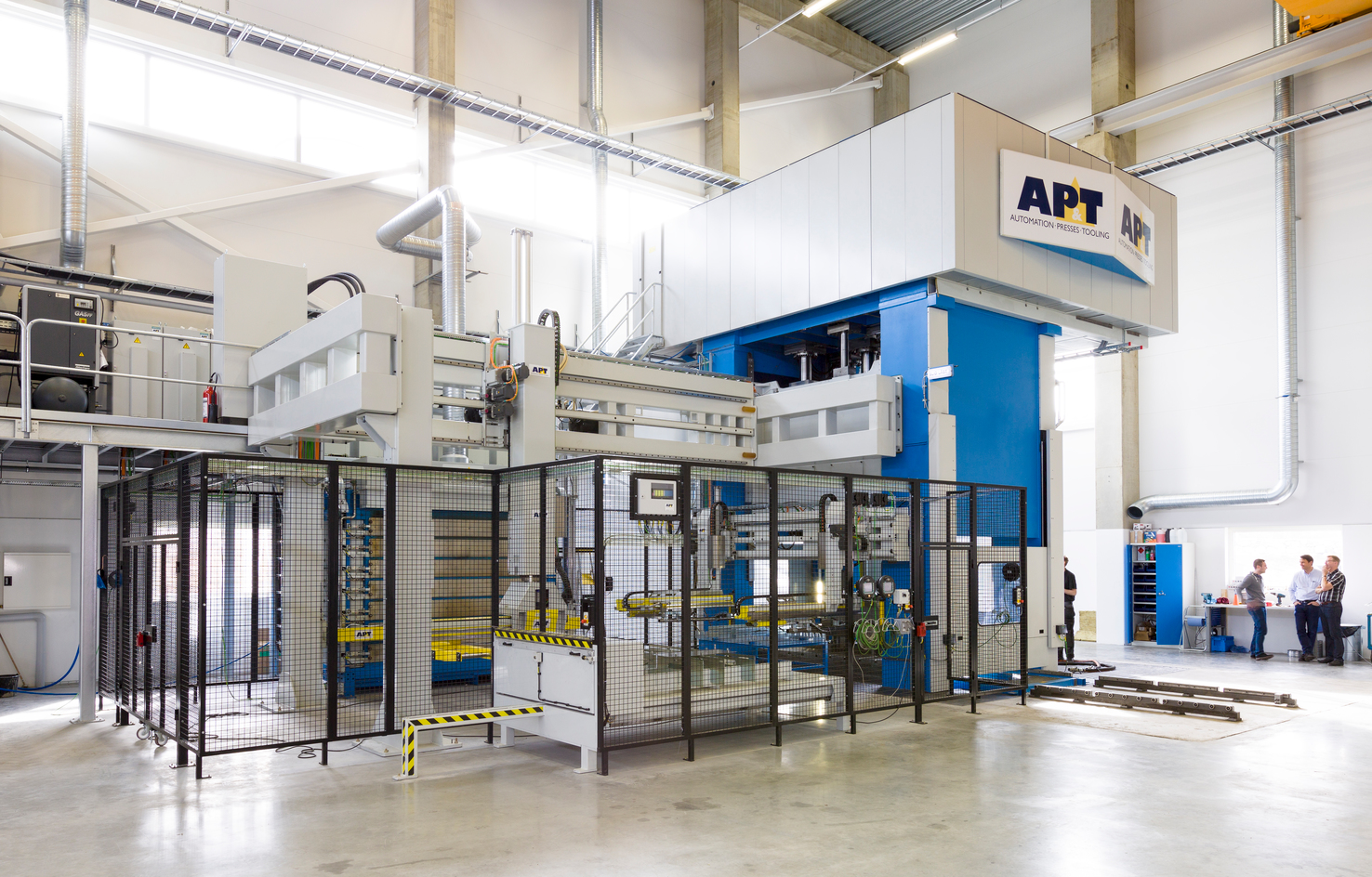
A complete press hardening production line built by AP&T.

AP&T supplies the sheet metal forming industry with complete production systems and aftermarket services such as service and spare parts solutions, rebuilds and training. The company manufactures its own automation, presses and tools.

- Complete production systems – The majority of AP&T's sales derive from complete production systems within selected niches. Press hardening lines for vehicle components have constituted the single largest niche during the 2010s.
- Automation – AP&T manufactures automation products for sheet metal handling in press operations, including destackers, press robots and transfer systems based on linear automation, as well as accessories and control systems.
- Presses – AP&T manufactures hydraulic presses for sheet metal forming with press forces between 1000 and 120000 kN. The product program includes standard presses for production of press hardened vehicle components, heat exchanger plates and ventilation and drainage products, for example.
- Tools – AP&T manufactures tools for sheet metal forming with complete production concepts for manufacturing press hardened vehicle components, heat exchanger plates and ventilation and drainage products.

=== Research and development ===
AP&T conducts its own research and development within sheet metal forming, and cooperates with Swedish and international research centers on the development of materials, methods and production systems.
