= Hestra, Gislaved =

Hestra
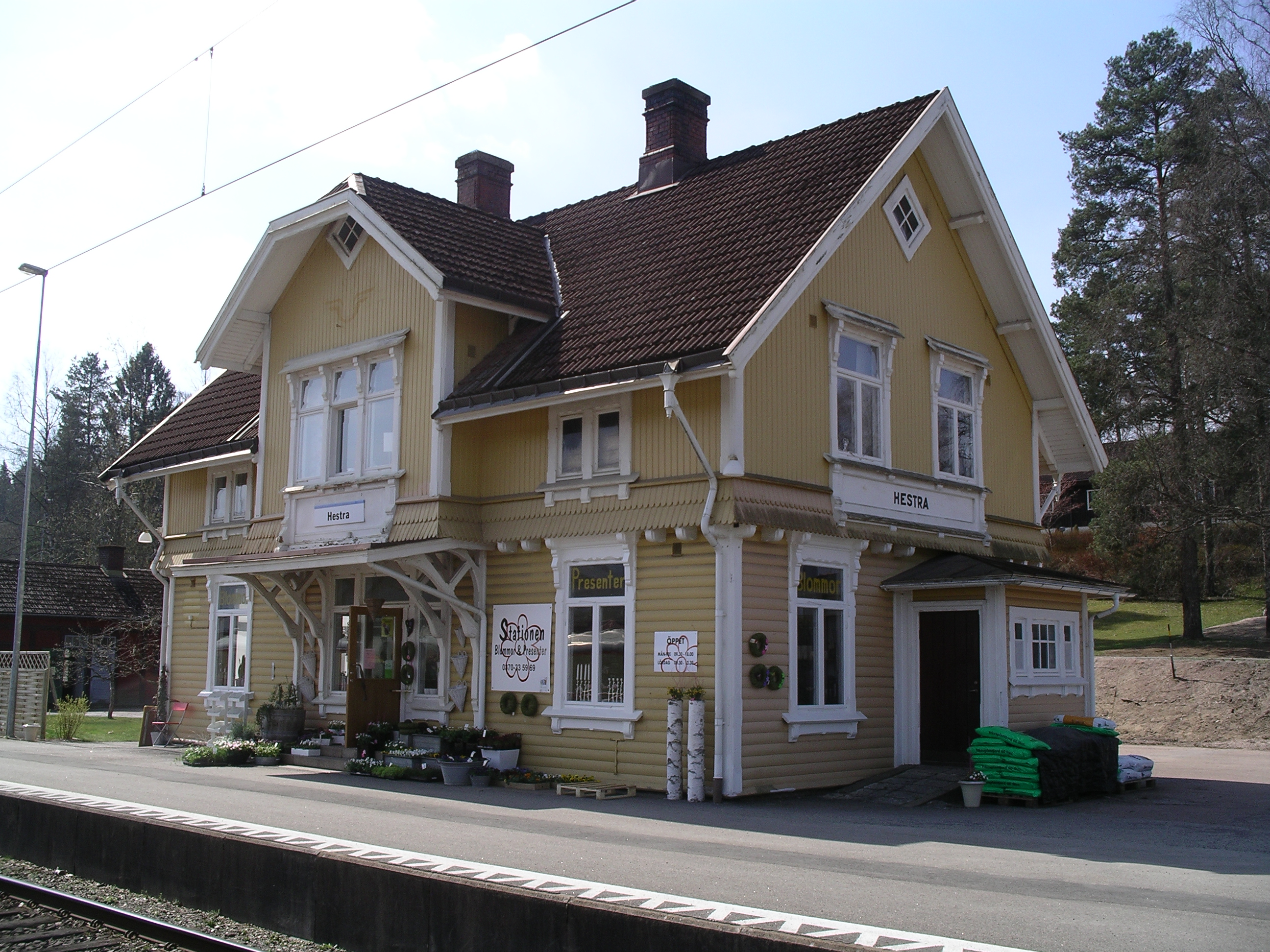
- Hestra railway station

- Location within Jönköping Location within Sweden
- Coordinates: 57°27′N 13°35′E
- Country: Sweden
- Province: Småland
- County: Jönköping County
- Municipality: Gislaved Municipality

Area
  - Total: 1.87 km^{2} (0.72 sq mi)

Population (31 December 2010)
  - Total: 1,306
  - Density: 698/km^{2} (1,810/sq mi)
- Time zone: UTC+1 (CET)
  - Summer (DST): UTC+2 (CEST)
- Climate: Cfb

Hestra is a locality situated in Gislaved Municipality, Jönköping County, Sweden with 1,306 inhabitants in 2010.

It is the origin of a company of the same name, Hestra, which designs and manufactures gloves.
