= Hestra =

Glove manufacturing company

Martin Magnusson & Co AB
- Type: Private
- Industry: Clothing
- Founded: 1936
- Headquarters: Hestra, Gislaved Municipality, Sweden
- Key people: Claes Magnusson, Co-owner; Svante Magnusson, President and Co-owner
- Products: Gloves
- Revenue: SEK 155.1 million (2009)
- Number of employees: 30 (2009)
- Website: hestragloves.com

Hestra (operating as Martin Magnusson & Co AB) is a family-owned company that designs and manufactures gloves. Founded by Martin Magnusson in 1936, the company makes gloves for alpine skiing and freeskiing. The family business is now run by the third and fourth generation of Magnussons. The company's flagship store is in Stockholm, Sweden.

== History ==
In 1936 Martin Magnusson started manufacturing gloves in Hestra, Småland. The first gloves were work gloves for lumberjacks. The gloves were made from strong leather and reinforced with rivets to withstand the hard work in the forest. In 1937 slalom slope was established at the local mountain Isaberg in Hestra. Skiers arrived by train to try the new sport. This increased demand for ski gloves. The second generation took over the business in 1963. Seth Morrison has been a brand ambassador.

== See also ==
- Glove stretcher
