= Micromy =

- Type: Private
- Industry: Hard surface coating, PVD
- Headquarters: Täby, Sweden
- Products: micronite
- Subsidiaries: Production facilities also in Germany
- Website: www.micromy.com

Micromy is a hard surface coating company based in Täby, Sweden. The company specializes in applying hard coating to a wide range of substrate materials using a PVD process (Physical vapor deposition). Depending on the application, different coating film materials can be produced, such as TiN (titanium nitride), TiC, TiNC (grey, anthracite, black), AlTiN (violet, black) or DLC (Diamond-Like Carbon). The coating is mainly used for industrial applications based on the different properties of the materials. However, the PVD process results in a finish such that many coatings are equally suitable for decorative purposes.

In addition to their production, Micromy also conducts research in the Täby facility. One of the applications of their research results is a new surface layer called micronite. Compared to conventional PVD coatings, micronite has outstanding tribological and corrosive properties.

The coatings offered by Micromy include coatings approved for medical use under the guidelines of the United States Food and Drug Administration (FDA). As such, they are suitable for sensitive applications like implants or drug manufacturing parts where biocompatibility is a requirement or where abrasive residue must be strictly controlled.

Micromy offers a low-temperature variant of the PVD process that makes it applicable for metal objects prone to heat deformation, or even polymer materials.

Although most of the revenue is generated from contract work on customer objects or substrates, Micromy also offers a small portfolio of their own articles. Most noted are their ultra-sharp scissors (both surgical scissors and haircutting/barber scissors). They also produce some jewelry items.
