= Diamyd Medical =

Swedish biotechnology company

Diamyd Medical AB (Stockholm NASDAQ, First North) is a small biotechnology company headquartered in Stockholm, Sweden that focuses on immune modifying therapies for type-1 diabetes. The company's investigational drug retogatein is based on a recombinant form of GAD_{65}, one of two human glutamate decarboxylase gene products.

Diamyd Medical logo

The company is headquartered in Stockholm, and maintains a "biomanufacturing" facility in Umeå which utilizes bacuolavirus-mediated protein expression.

== Patents ==
Information here is NOT comprehensive as it depends on news items rather than patent database information extraction.

In 2026, Diamyd received notice that it would be granted a patent in Japan for antigenic treatment of Type I diabetes patients carrying the HLA DR4-DQ8 haplotype. In the United States, the firm received notice it would be granted a methodological patent for alum-based intralymphatic retogatein (one of the company's investigaional drugs) administration.
