= TerraNet AB =

Terranet AB
- Industry: Advanced driver assistance systems
- Founded: 2004
- Founder: Anders Carlius
- Headquarters: Lund, Sweden
- Key people: Lars Lindell
- Number of employees: 22
- Website: www.terranet.se

Terranet AB is a company that develops technology for Advanced driver-assistance systems (ADAS) and autonomous vehicles. It is headquartered in Sweden and has an office in Stuttgart, Germany. Terranet is currently led by acting CEO Lars Lindell.

Terranet previously focused on delivering mobile telephony and data services via a peer-to-peer mobile mesh network of handsets and light infrastructure. Since 2018, the company is focused on developing technology for advanced driver assistance and autonomous vehicles.

Terranet addresses the fast-growing global ADAS market, which is projected to reach USD 84 billion by 2025 - an increase of 150% from 2021.

The company's primary focus is to develop and commercialize their BlincVision product, a new type of anti-collision system for advanced driver assistance for motorized vehicles based on laser scanning, event cameras and three-dimensional image analysis. BlincVision is based on Voxelflow, a patented software for advanced three-dimensional image analysis of moving objects. In May 2022, Terranet shared that BlincVision is expected to be production ready in a couple of years.

Terranet Holding AB (publ) is listed on Nasdaq First North Premier Growth Market since 2017 (Nasdaq: TERRNT B).

== History ==
Terranet AB was founded in 2004 by the inventor Anders Carlius, a serial entrepreneur from Lund, Skåne County. Carlius, who came from a background in chip manufacturing with Switchcore and also worked for web portal operator Spray Network, served as the first CEO until 2010. Since its inception Terranet has been headquartered at Lund's Ideon Science Park, which is best known as the home of Ericsson Radio Systems.

Carlius says he came up with the idea while travelling on safari in east Africa with his wife Emma. The first extensive pilot project was carried out in the autumn of 2005 on a farming co-operative in Botswana. Other trials included an agreement with Indian operator Bharat Sanchar Nigam to test 50 handsets in late 2012, and a number of pilots in South America. That year, development engineer Conny Do said his main prerogative was to miniaturise Terranet's credit card-sized circuit so that it could be installed in any mobile handset.

In 2017, Terranet was listed on Nasdaq First North Premier Growth Market (Nasdaq: TERRNT-B). The following year, the company decided to focus its operations on developing technologies for the automotive industry, more specifically for advanced driver assistance and autonomous vehicles.

On October 20, 2020, Terranet signed a Memorandum of Understanding with leading automotive marque Mercedes-Benz AG regarding the use of their advanced driver-assist systems and 3D motion awareness technology.
