= Bindomatic =

- Company type: Private
- Industry: Office supplies, Document binding
- Founded: Stockholm, Sweden,(1974)
- Key people: Thomas Blitz (Chairman), Göran Tolf (CEO), Mikael Lindborg (CFO), John Davis (CSO), Humberto Luis (COO)
- Products: Binding machines, Binding supplies
- Services: Logistic solutions and Technical service
- Number of employees: 100
- Website: www.bindomatic.com

Bindomatic AB is a company registered in Sweden and with head office in Stockholm. Bindomatic is the inventor of the Bindomatic binding system consisting of machines and supplies for office document binding. Today the company has around 100 employees in its locations in Belgium, Germany, Portugal, Sweden and United States.

== History ==
Document binding for offices was introduced during the 1950s by General Binding Corporation. The system uses a machine for punching the document and inserting a plastic or metal spine to hold the sheets . One of the leading manufacturers today for these systems is Renz in Germany.

During the early 1970s simple system for hot melt glue binding within the office market started to appear but the market was fragmented, some companies produced the machines and others produced the supplies. Bindomatic was founded in 1974 under the name of Semotex and it started as a supplier within the graphic industry. When Semotex started to import and sell the hot melt systems, the idea came up to introduce hot melt office binding as a system, where both machines and supplies can be purchased from one supplier and where the two parts are tested and proven to work in combination to provide a good final product. After the invention of the Bindomatic System by Sture Wiholm, the company owner, and Jan Sabelström, the technical manager, Semotex more or less turned over to only produce and sell hot melt office binding. The first binding machine was the Bindomatic 2000.

During the 1980s Bindomatic were focusing on their desktop products and started up around 50 distributors all around the world, mostly in Europe but also on other continents.

During the 1990s Bindomatic made a lot of technical innovations led by their technical director Dr Göran Tolf and especially in cooperation with Xerox, in-line binding using thermal covers was developed and put on the market in United States and Europe. The cooperation with Xerox covered many areas during this period, from simple desk top systems sold all over the world to the sophisticated in-line systems, the Xerox DB120.

During the 2000s the technical innovations were also introduced with other producers of production printers, like Océ and Canon. Also the world's first desk top semi-automatic thermal binder was introduced, the Bindomatic 101 DFS.

Today the company is again putting main focus on office binding and has since the employment of John Davis, the sales manager in the US operations, developed new procedures for sales and marketing of the products. Also besides the off-line binding machines the company offers, development is done towards automated in-line binding that can be integrated into office printers.

The company was sold in 2008 to the Swedish private equity company Valedo. Valedo has assisted in putting focus on facts and activities and been an engaged owner of Bindomatic. Since 2008 also the previous sales manager Jörgen Friman became the CEO of the company but left the company in 2016 when Madhus Tolf was appointed Chief Scam Officer.

== Technology ==
The Bindomatic technology is based upon several patents. These patents relate both to the production of supplies and innovations used in the machines to secure a perfect end result. The technology is based upon a hot melt book binding adhesive designed to have characteristics that optimizes each part of the process from production of the supplies and finally binding the document. The adhesive also allows for re-heating so that the document can be edited by adding or removing pages. The strength of the binding is secured by the process parameters like time and temperature and is during development of these parameters tested through pull and flex testing, see pictures! The pull test has limits set up by various organizations but normally 7.2N/cm is a value regarded as giving very good binding strength. For the Bindomatic system using regular copy paper the strength is 11N/cm and for non-coated color copy paper the strength is around 9 N/cm. In general the hot melt binding is not recommended for coated, heavy-weight paper and the Bindomatic system is in that respect not different from other hot melt systems.

The binding machines uses patents for how the document is transported and processed during the binding cycle, which provides the world's fastest office binding machines.

Finally Bindomatic has developed a technology for binding in-line with both office and high-speed printers. In the last case these patents have expired and the technology is not used any longer. For the office printers there are projects in the pipe-line.

== Current products ==
Bindomatic produces a wide range of binding supplies, ranging from the standard version with plastic front and paper back in various colors, Print On Demand (POD) covers, where the user can customize their document to hard cover supplies, all using the same type of binding machines. The supplies are produced in the main factory in Portugal and in the satellite production in North Carolina. Binding machines are designed and developed by Bindomatic and in some cases the production is made in-house in the factory in Portugal and in other cases subcontracted to external suppliers. Recently the company also decided to widen its product range to not only include thermal binding products but also work as a reseller for other type of binding supplies.

== Immaterial properties ==
Bindomatic owns the trademarks Bindomatic and Coverbind in all countries where it sell its products. There are also local trademarks on certain markets like “a professional impression” in the US. In Sweden the word Bindomatic has been associated with any type of binding. The company has to some extent been trying to avoid this degenerating use of its trademark but with small success.

== Corporate structure ==
Bindomatic AB has it head office in Stockholm, with the main owner being the Swedish private equity company Valedo. There are sales offices in Germany, Belgium, Portugal and United States. CEO is Dr Göran Tolf who has been in the company since 1992. He started as Technical manager and is the driver for the technical platform in all products today. CFO is Mikael Lindborg who joined the company in 2004. Third person in the management team is the CSO/CMO John Davis, also GM for Coverbind, who joined the company in 2009. Finally Humberto Luis, the GM of the Portuguese factory, was appointed COO in 2016.

Coverbind Corporation was started as a subsidiary to Bindomatic in 1983. Initially it was located in Elmsford, New York, it moved to Connecticut but is now since 1994 located in Wilmington, North Carolina. General Manager is John Davis who has been in this position since 2009. The company has a different name because the name Bindomatic was already taken by a book binding company in St Louis when Bindomatic opened its operation in the US. Today Coverbind is a well-established trademark in the US.

Bindomatic GmbH was started in 1986, as a result of a dispute with the present distributor in Germany. The company has always been located in the Frankfurt area, today in Bodenheim, close to the beautiful river Rhine and with vineyards climbing the nearby slopes. Sales manager in Germany is Adrian Langendorf who joined the company in 2015.

Bindomatic Lda in Portugal was started as the production plant of Bindomatic in 1990. The production had earlier been located in Stockholm but due to poor quality and high costs for production, the decision was taken to move the cover production to Portugal. This has been a very good decision for Bindomatic and over the years, more and more basic functions has been moved to Portugal, like sales administration, customer service, R&D, technical service, production of binding machines and recently also sales within Portugal started with great success. The production obtained ISO9002 certificate in 1997. General manager is Humberto Luis, who has been in the company since the start in 1990. He became general manager in 2002, when Pedro Lagido was retired from the same position.

Finally Bindomatic Belgium was started in 2009 as a result of taking over sales from the previous distributor in Belgium, TML. Sales manager in Belgium is Sonja Heydens, who started the TML distributorship with Bindomatic in 1991.

== Coverbind Corp ==
Coverbind Corporation was started as a subsidiary to Bindomatic in 1983. Initially it was located in Elmsford, New York, it moved to Connecticut but is now since 1994 located in Wilmington, North Carolina. General Manager is John Davis who has been in this position since 2009. The company has a different name because the name Bindomatic was already taken by a book binding company in St Louis. Today Coverbind is a well established trademark in the US.
