= Göinge Mekaniska =

Swedish steel building company

Göinge Mekaniska was one of the leading Swedish steel building companies. It was founded in 1946 and in 1997 it was acquired by Skanska. In 2005 Göinge Mekaniska was merged into Skanska.

It was specialized in large buildings like:

- large span buildings
- hangars
- high-bay warehouses
- shopping malls
- large industrial buildings, etc.
