= Investment AB Latour =

Swedish investment company

- Type: Aktiebolag
- Traded as: Nasdaq Stockholm: LATO B
- Industry: Investment
- Founded: 1984; 42 years ago
- Headquarters: Gothenburg, Sweden
- Key people: Fredrik Palmstierna (Chairman); Jan Svensson (CEO)
- Parent: Förvaltnings AB Wasatornet (77,0%)
- Website: www.latour.se

Investment AB Latour is an investment company that was controlled by the Swedish businessman and billionaire Gustaf Douglas and his family. Gustaf Douglas died on 3 May 2023.

Through the company, Gustaf Douglas controlled inter alia, security firm Securitas AB and the world-leading lock producer Assa Abloy. Latour is also the biggest shareholder of the world's largest RVM provider Tomra (with 21.08% of the stock as of July 2021).

Gustaf Douglas' wife and one of his sons currently serve on the company board.

In 2025, Latour entered a partnership with the Swedish non-profit Voice of the Ocean to produce the documentary Ocean Dreams.
