= Orust Municipality =

Orust Municipality Orusts kommun
- Municipality
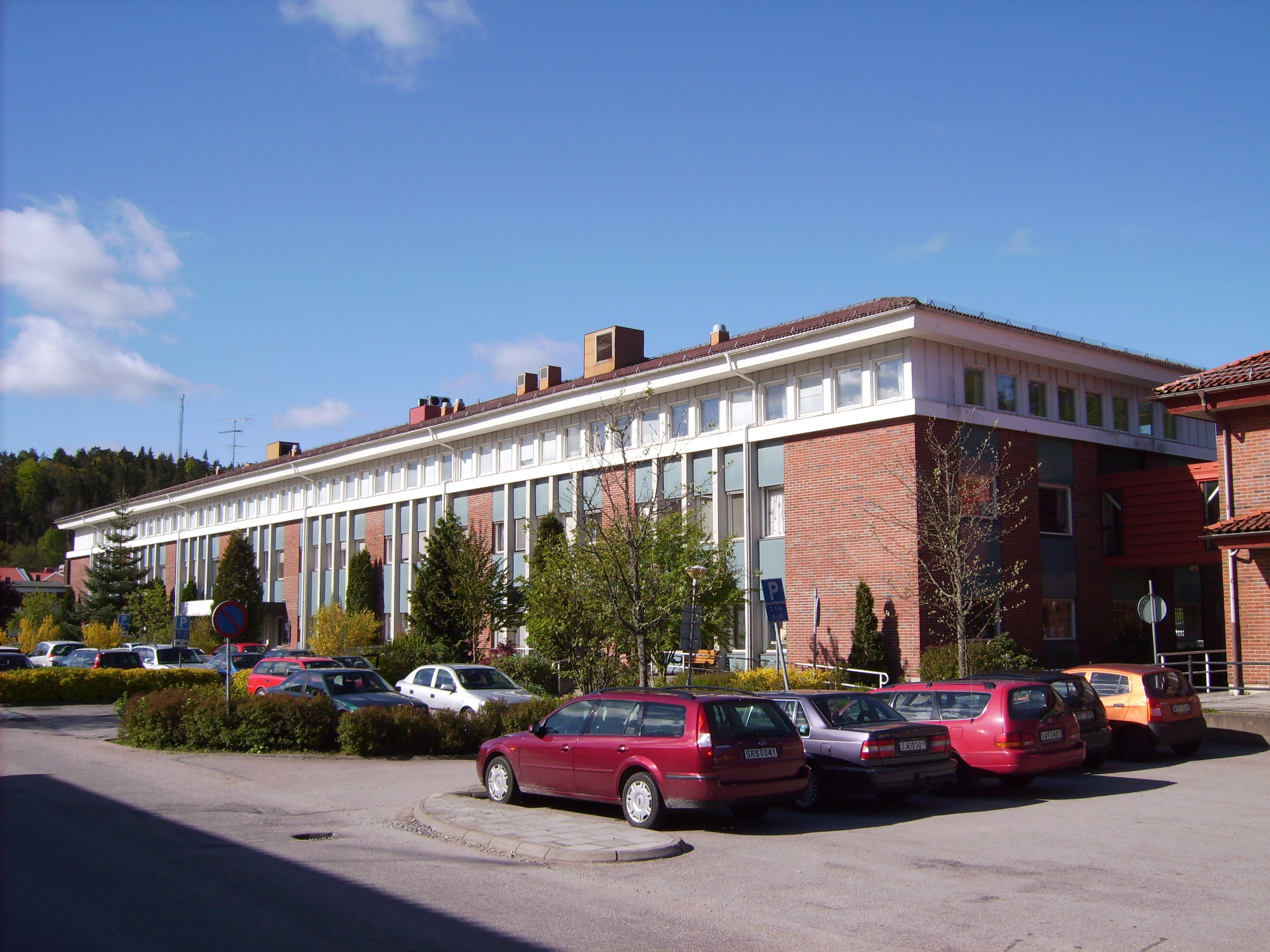
- Orust town hall

- Coat of arms

- Coordinates: 58°14′N 11°41′E
- Country: Sweden
- County: Västra Götaland County
- Seat: Henån

Area
  - Total: 882.99 km^{2} (340.92 sq mi)
  - Land: 386.52 km^{2} (149.24 sq mi)
  - Water: 496.47 km^{2} (191.69 sq mi)
- Area as of 1 January 2014.

Population (30 June 2025)
  - Total: 15,387
  - Density: 39.809/km^{2} (103.11/sq mi)
- Time zone: UTC+1 (CET)
  - Summer (DST): UTC+2 (CEST)
- ISO 3166 code: SE
- Province: Bohuslän
- Municipal code: 1421
- Website: www.orust.se

Orust Municipality (Swedish: Orusts kommun) is a municipality in Västra Götaland County in western Sweden. Its seat is located in the town of Henån, with an approximate population of 1,800.

The municipality includes Sweden's third largest island Orust and some other small adjacent islets. The year-round population of around 15,000 increases significantly in the summer due to an influx of summer vacationers.

The former municipal entities on the island Orust and adjacent minor islands were grouped into larger units in 1952 and united into a single municipality in connection with the nationwide municipal reform of 1971.

Sigfrid Edstrom, Former president of the IOC, Industrialist & Chairman of the Sweden-America Foundation, was born here

== Geography ==
The island Orust has a land area of 346 square kilometres (134 sq mi), Sweden's fourth largest island.

The villages in the municipality are Ellös, Henån, Svanesund, Hälleviksstrand, Mollösund, Svanvik and Varekil.

== Demographics ==
This is a demographic table based on Orust Municipality's electoral districts in the 2022 Swedish general election sourced from SVT's election platform, in turn taken from SCB official statistics.

In total there were 15,322 residents, including 12,490 Swedish citizens of voting age. 44.3% voted for the left coalition and 54.5% for the right coalition. Indicators are in percentage points except population totals and income.

Location	Residents	Citizen adults	Left vote	Right vote	Employed	Swedish parents	Foreign heritage	Income SEK	Degree
Location			%	%					
Långelanda C	1,429	1,130	39.0	60.1	86	90	10	27,394	31
Långelanda	1,806	1,406	46.3	52.1	82	85	15	24,682	41
Morlanda V	1,029	983	44.2	55.1	77	94	6	24,195	42
Morlanda Ö	1,723	1,458	45.5	53.2	80	90	10	23,864	28
Myckleby	1,317	1,060	48.0	50.6	83	91	9	25,991	37
Röra V	1,068	865	47.3	51.5	83	90	10	23,895	35
Röra Ö	1,900	1,455	43.5	54.9	78	85	15	23,649	31
Stala	2,157	1,742	42.0	56.7	84	89	11	25,729	30
Tegneby	1,287	1,080	42.2	56.5	86	94	6	26,756	35
Torp	1,606	1,311	47.4	51.5	84	91	9	26,557	37
Source: SVT

== History ==
Historically, the area has been inhabited for thousands of years, as evident by ancient remains such as tombs, grave fields and rock carvings. Dating from the Viking Age, runestones are plentiful throughout Orust.

In the Nordisk familjebok, the island of Orust is mentioned as a Geatish territory. Ramshult (the modern Swedish form), a hill fort, is mentioned in Beowulf as Hrefnesholt, the Geatish hill fort which became the prison of Onela, Ohthere and their mother until their rescue by Ongenþeow.

== Economy ==
Industry wise, the area has always been dominated by fishing and boat production. Shipyard Hallberg-Rassy is the largest employer nowadays. Its shipyard is located in Ellös, on the north-west part of the island, and it has a significant export of sailing boats. The second largest employer is Najad-varvet, also a shipyard.

== Points of interest ==
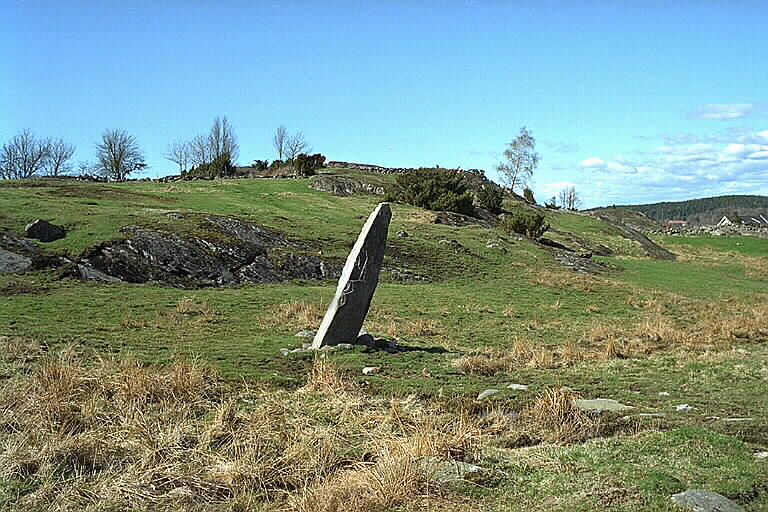
Runestone on Orust

The geography offers several sights, with a couple of picturesque small villages. A nature reserve called Morlanda features a lookout point that offers a good overview of the area.

== See also ==
- Orust Eastern Hundred, historical hundred
- Orust Western Hundred, historical hundred
- Varekilsnäs, most southern village on Orust
