= Hallberg-Rassy =

Swedish sailboat manufacturer

Coordinates: 58°10′43″N 11°27′55″E

Hallberg-Rassy Varvsaktiebolag
- Company type: Aktiebolag
- Industry: Yacht building
- Founded: 1943; 83 years ago
- Founder: Harry Hallberg, Christoph Rassy
- Defunct: 29 September 1998
- Headquarters: Ellös, Orust Municipality, Sweden
- Area served: Worldwide
- Key people: Magnus Rassy
- Owner: The Rassy Family
- Number of employees: 87 (2016/2017)
- Website: www.hallberg-rassy.com

Hallberg-Rassy Varvsaktiebolag (HR) is a Swedish shipyard internationally known for producing high quality blue water sailing yachts. The company's yard is located in Ellös on the island of Orust, Västra Götaland.

== History ==
Harry Hallberg founded his yard in 1943, and in 1965 Christoph Rassy founded a yard, in the premises recently vacated by Hallberg. Harry Hallberg's most distinguished contribution was his understanding of the advantages of using GRP and to build boats in a series. Hallberg-Rassy was formed when Rassy purchased the Hallberg yard after Harry Halberg's retirement in 1972. Since 1989 all boats have been designed by the Argentinian engineer and yacht designer Germán Frers. To date, more than 9,400 yachts have been completed by the yard. The company is owned by the Rassy family, and is managed by Magnus Rassy.

== Models ==
Model	Version	Length	Years	No. Built	Notes
Misil I		7.35 m	1964 - 1972	120	
Hallberg-Rassy 24 - Misil II		7.35 m	1972 - 1977	596	
Hallberg-Rassy 26		7.95 m	1978 - 1985	469	
P 28		8.61 / 9.04 m	1955 - 1973	536	
Hallberg-Rassy 29		8.90 m	1982 - 1994	571	
Hallberg-Rassy Monsun 31		9.36 m	1974 - 1982	904	
Hallberg-Rassy 312		9.42 m	1979 - 1993	690	
Hallberg-Rassy 31	Mk I	9.62 m	1992 - 2005	356	
Hallberg-Rassy 31	Mk II	9.62 m	2005 - 2009	50	
Hallberg-Rassy 310		9.42 m	2010–Present	>	Aft cockpit
Hallberg-Rassy 94 Kutter		9.40 m	1981 - 1994	195	
Mistress 32		9.70 m	1969 - 1974	110	
Hallberg-Rassy Mistral 33		10.18 m	1966 - 1975	216	
Hallberg-Rassy 34		10.28 m	1990 - 2005	484	Aft cockpit
Hallberg-Rassy 340		10.36 m	2017–Present	>	Aft Cockpit
Hallberg-Rassy 342		10.32 m	2005 - 2017	328	Aft cockpit
Hallberg-Rassy Rasmus 35		10.50 m	1967 - 1978	760	
Hallberg-Rassy 352		10.54 m	1978 - 1991	802	
Hallberg-Rassy 36	Mk I	10.87 m	1989 - 1994	256	
Hallberg-Rassy 36	Mk II	11.31 m	1994 - 2003	346	
Hallberg-Rassy 37		11.32 m	2003 - 2012	200	
Hallberg-Rassy 372		11.35 m	2008–Present	>	New hull no the 37; aft cockpit
Hallberg-Rassy 38		11.57 m	1977 - 1986	202	
Hallberg-Rassy 382		11.62 m	1984 - 1992	116	Improved 38 sailplan, refined interior.
Hallberg-Rassy 39	Mk I	11.85 m	1991 - 1994	54	
Hallberg-Rassy 39	Mk II	12.22 m	1994 - 2003	155	
Hallberg-Rassy 40C		12.30 m	2019–Present	>	
Hallberg-Rassy 40	Mk I	12.40 m	2002 - 2015	160	
Hallberg-Rassy 40	Mk II	12.40 m	2016 - 2018	2	
Hallberg-Rassy 41		12.50 m	1975 - 1981	105	
Hallberg-Rassy 412		12.61 m	2012–Present	>	Aft Cockpit
Hallberg-Rassy 42 (E)		12.93 m	1980 - 1991	252	
Hallberg-Rassy 42F	Mk I	12.96 m	1991 - 1994	53	
Hallberg-Rassy 42F	Mk II	13.22 m	1994 - 2001	128	
Hallberg-Rassy 43	Mk I	13.57 m	2001 - 2007	150	
Hallberg-Rassy 43	Mk II	13.57 m	2007 - 2013	40	
Hallberg-Rassy 43	Mk III	13.57 m	2013 - 2016	9	
Hallberg-Rassy 44		13.68 m	2016–Present	>	
Hallberg-Rassy 45		14.12 m	1988 - 1996	71	
Hallberg-Rassy 46		14.76 m	1995 - 2005	134	
Hallberg-Rassy 48	Mk I	14.99 m	2004 - 2013	69	
Hallberg-Rassy 48	Mk2	14.99 m	2014–Present	29	ceasing production August 2020
Hallberg-Rassy 49		14.96 m	1982 - 1997	89	
Hallberg-Rassy 50		15.23 m	2020—Present	>	
Hallberg-Rassy 53		16.44 m	1992 - 2006	88	
Hallberg-Rassy 54		16.74 m	2006 - 2012	44	
Hallberg-Rassy 55		16.68 m	2012–2017	9	
Hallberg-Rassy 57		17.44	2018—Present	>	
Hallberg-Rassy 62		18.88 m	1997 - 2011	25	
Hallberg-Rassy 64		19.85 m	2011–Present	>	
Hallberg-Rassy 69		20.96 m	2024-Present		

== Hallberg-Rassy Owners Associations ==
A number of associations for current and potential owners of Hallberg-Rassy yachts are active worldwide. They are based in the United Kingdom, Netherlands, Denmark and Norway. The associations promote sailing, regattas, information exchange, social and other activities. They include:

- Hallberg-Rassy Owners Group, global discussion board with 791 members. It contains a large searchable database on a range of HR related discussions and documents. Restricted to Hallberg-Rassy owners and their regular crew.
- The Hallberg-Rassy Owners Association, based in the United Kingdom.
- Hallberg-Rassy Connectie, based in the Netherlands and includes members from Germany and Belgium.

== Regattas ==
HR hosts annual Hallberg-Rassy Regattas in Sweden, plus, a number of regattas have been held in the UK, the Netherlands, the US and Italy.

== See also ==
- List of sailboat designers and manufacturers
