= Orust =

Island of Sweden

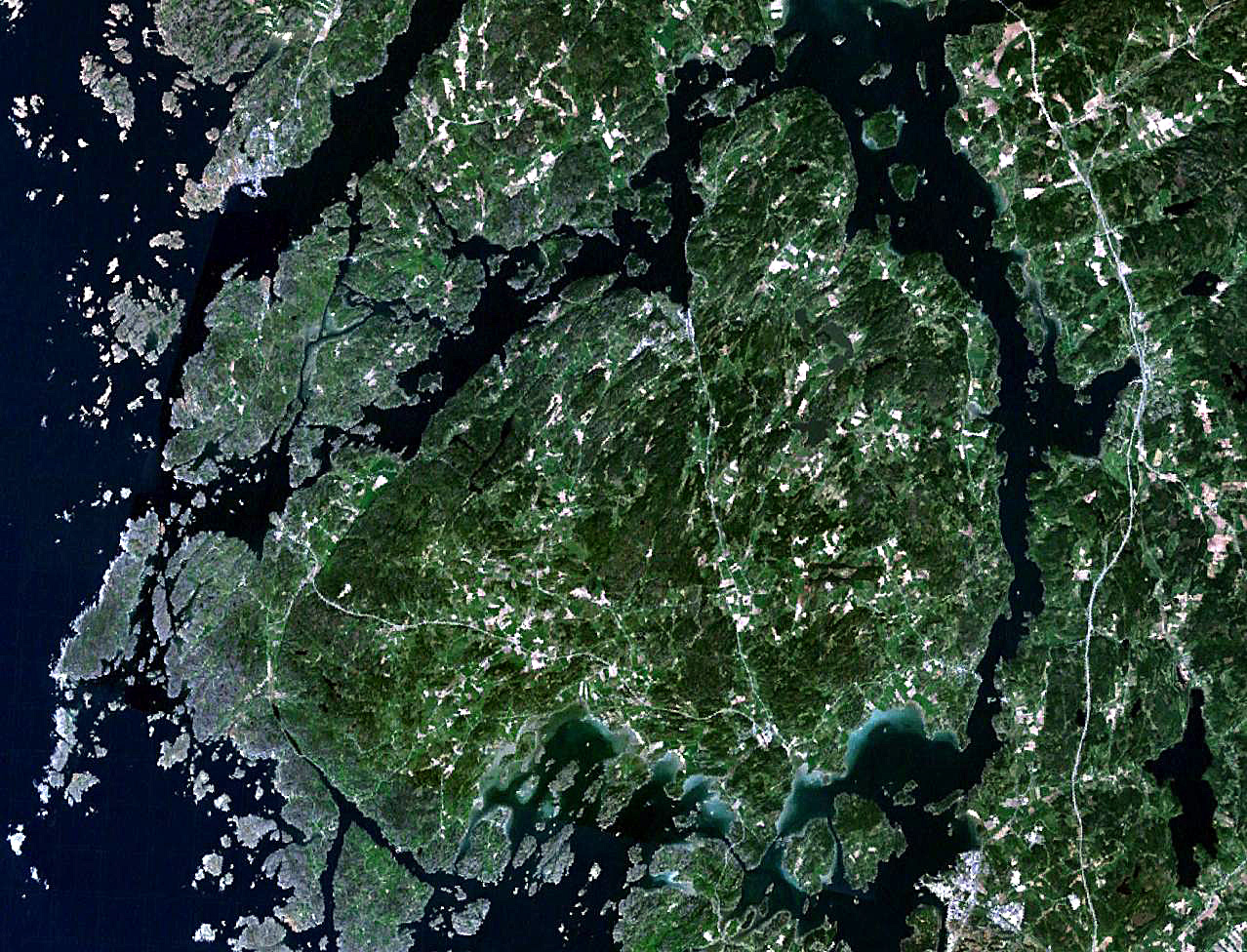
- Interactive map of Orust

Geography
- Coordinates: 58°10′24.96″N 11°37′44.5″E

Administration
- Sweden
- County: Västra Götaland
- Municipality: Orust
- Area covered: 345.60 km^{2} (133.44 sq mi)

Orust (Swedish pronunciation: [ˈûːrɵst]) is an island in Bohuslän, western Sweden. In 2014 Statistics Sweden declared it to be the fourth largest island in Sweden, under a definition which adds artificial canals to the possible bodies of water surrounding an island. It has been noted that under this definition, all of Götaland would be the country's largest island, rendering Orust instead the fifth largest. It is Sweden's third largest naturally created island. The largest town on Orust is Henån, the municipal capital, where approximately 1,800 inhabitants live. Other communities, many of which are fishing villages, include Ellös, Edshultshall, Hälleviksstrand, Mollösund, Morlanda, Stocken, Svanesund, Svanvik and Varekil. Orust is home to approximately 15,160 inhabitants in the winter and many more in the summer. Its main industry is the shipyards, the two largest being Najadvarvet and Hallberg-Rassy.

== International relations ==
=== Twin towns – Sister cities ===
Orust is twinned with:

- Aalborg, Denmark

== See also ==
- Orust Municipality
- Orust Eastern Hundred
- Orust Western Hundred
- Haga dolmen
