= Najad Yachts =

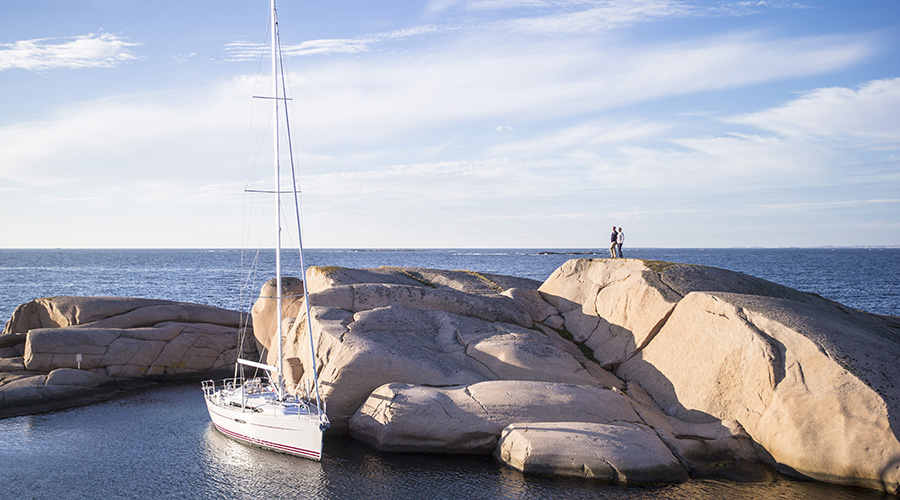
Najad 411 CC

Najad Yachts is a yacht builder headquartered in Henån, Sweden. According to the company website, the firm was founded in 1971. As of 2005, the company had 160 employees, and produced up to approximately 80 yachts per year. Worldwide sales include Europe, Australia, New Zealand, Turkey and the US.

== History ==
Najad was founded in 1967 by Berndt Arvidsson and Thorwald Karlsson, in Kungsviken, Orust, Sweden. The first model, a 34-foot boat designed by Olle Enderlein, was built in 1971. It went from the at the time traditional long keel to a more natural end of the propeller shaft, while the engine was given a more appropriate location. Najadvarvet went bankrupt in 2011, after which the bankruptcy estate was bought by Nord West Yachts. Najad AB, the company's name after 2014, is now owned by Orust Quality Yachts AB, a subsidiary of Hexiron AB in Lund, which also owns Arcona Yachts.

== Current models ==
- Najad 395 AC - new model 2018
- Najad 395 CC - new model 2018
- Najad 450 CC - new model 2016
- Najad 505 CC - Next Generation
- Najad 570 CC

== Old models ==
- Najad 320, built 1983 – 1994
- Najad 330, built 1993 – 1996
- Najad 331, Built 1997 - 2003
- Najad 34, built 1972 – 1980
- Najad 340, built 1987 – 1994
- Najad 343, built 1981 – 1989
- Najad 355,
- Najad 360, built 1985 – 1994
- Najad 361, built 1994 – 2001
- Najad 37, built 1980 – 1983
- Najad 370, built 1991 – 1997
- Najad 371, built 1983 – 1985
- Najad 390, built 1984 – 1995
- Najad 391, built 1995 – 2003
- Najad 410
- Najad 420, built 1991 – 1996
- Najad 440, built 1986 – 1995
- Najad 440 CC
- Najad 441, built 1995 – 2001
- Najad 510, built 1990 – 1993
- Najad 520, built 1994 – 2001
- Najad 520DS, built 1995 – 2001
- Najad 373, built 1999 – 2005
- Najad 400, built 2001 – 2005
- Najad 405, built 2006 – 2009

== See also ==
- List of sailboat designers and manufacturers
- Jeanne Socrates — winner of the Cruising Club of America's Blue Water Medal and oldest female to have circumnavigated the world single-handed, sailing her Najad 380, Nereida
