= Elos (disambiguation) =

Elos is a village and a municipality in the southern part of Laconia, Greece.

Elos may also refer to:

- Elos, Chania, a village in Chania, Crete, Greece
- Elos Elonga-Ekakia (born 1974), a retired Congolese footballer
- BANK KITAYa (ELOS), a bank in Russia

== See also ==
- Ellös, Orust Municipality, Västra Götaland County, Sweden
