= Vindö (boat) =

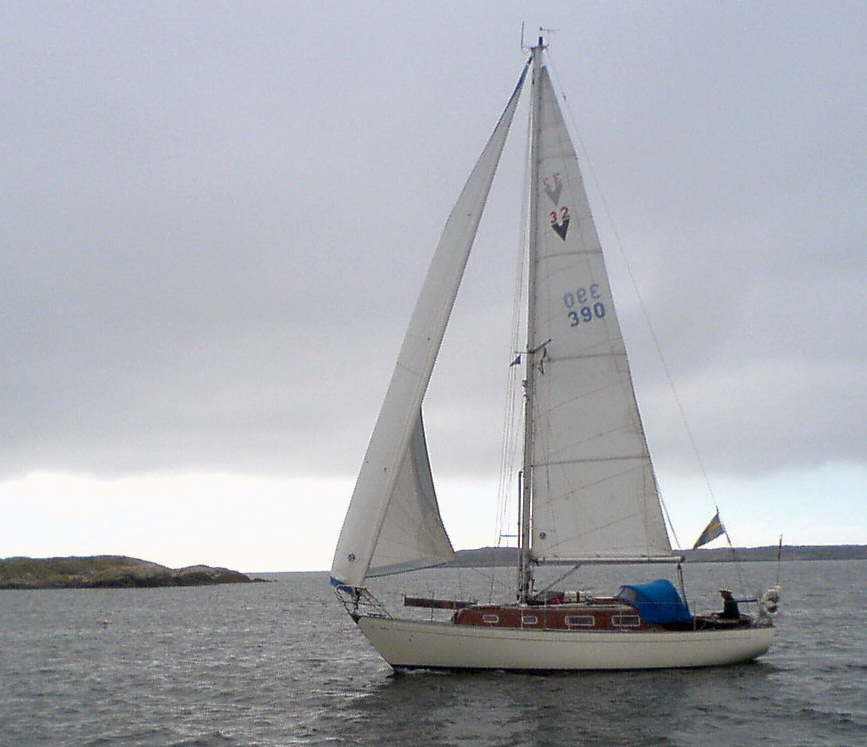
A Vindö 32 reaching

Vindö was a little boat yard on the Swedish west coast, situated between Orust and the mainland outside Uddevalla. The yard was best known for their small wooden boats in the 1960s, and converted to GRP material in 1965. First they updated the present range of Vindö 30, but the newcomer - the 35 feet (11 m) long Vindö 50 made the yard famous. The combination of GRP hull and fine quality teak and mahogany structures demanded for newer boats, and the 29 feet (8.8 m) long Vindö 32 was launched in 1973. Shortly after came the 31 feet (9.4 m) long Vindö 40 - best known for the reversed topsides of the hull. In 1982 came Vindö 45 - a 34 feet (10 m) long boat with more modern lines - and a greater volume. This was shortly followed by the first of many bankruptcies, and the yard stopped production of new boats in 1990.

There has also been the Vindö 65 (which not was a traditional Vindö) at 38 feet (12 m), Vindö 75 and a 43 feet (13 m) Vindö 90 but these had limited production volume.

Of earlier boats the Vindö 18, 22, 28 and 30 are to be mentioned.
