= List of shipwrecks in November 1876 =

The list of shipwrecks in November 1876 includes ships sunk, foundered, grounded, or otherwise lost during November 1876.

== 1 November ==
List of shipwrecks: 1 November 1876
Ship	State	Description
Alexa	United Kingdom	The schooner was driven ashore on Norderney, Germany. Her crew were rescued. She was on a voyage from Burghead, Moray to Hamburg, Germany.
Baldur	Denmark	The ship was driven ashore and wrecked at Danzig, Germany. She was on a voyage from Memel, Germany to Sunderland, County Durham, United Kingdom.
Elfrida	Norway	The schooner was driven ashore and wrecked on Osmussaar, Russia with the loss of a crew member.
Euterpe	United Kingdom	The brig was driven ashore and wrecked at East London, Cape Colony.
Fortuna	Norway	The brig ran aground on the Sand Hall Flat, off the coast of Lincolnshire, United Kingdom and sank. All on board were rescued. She was on a voyage from Alloa, Clackmannanshire, United Kingdom to Christiania.
Free Lance	United Kingdom	The steamship collided with a Greek brig and ran aground in the Danube 40 nautical miles (74 km) from its mouth.
Gesina	Germany	The galiot was driven ashore on Norderney. Her crew were rescued. She was on a voyage from Newcastle upon Tyne, Northumberland, United Kingdom to Leer.
Hohenzollern	Germany	The barque was driven ashore and wrecked at East London.
Sylphide	United Kingdom	The ship was driven ashore at Danzig. She was on a voyage from Blyth, Northumberland to Danzig.
Vale	Sweden	The steamship was driven ashore near "Husvalla", Öland. She was on a voyage from Gävle to Hull, Yorkshire, United Kingdom.

== 2 November ==
List of shipwrecks: 2 November 1876
Ship	State	Description
Edward Herbert	United Kingdom	The ship was driven ashore at Wilmington, Delaware, United States. She was on a voyage from Wilmington to London. She was refloated and resumed her voyage.
Ellen	United Kingdom	The schooner foundered in the English Channel 4 nautical miles (7.4 km) off the South Foreland, Kent. Her crew reached shore in their boat. She was on a voyage from Portsmouth, Hampshire to Sunderland, County Durham.
Hartlepool	United Kingdom	The steamship ran aground at Dunkirk, Nord. She was on a voyage from Newcastle upon Tyne, Northumberland to Dunkirk.
Huddersfield	United Kingdom	The steamship was driven ashore between Donna Nook, and North Somercotes Lincolnshire, United Kingdom. She was on a voyage from Hamburg, Germany to Grimsby, Lincolnshire. She was refloated with the assistance of a number of tugs.
Jenny	United Kingdom	The schooner foundered in the Irish Sea 12 nautical miles (22 km) east of Dunmore East, County Waterford. Her crew reached Limerick in their boat. She was on a voyage from Bangor to Limerick.
Marie	Denmark	The ship ran aground and sank off Norderney, Germany. She was on a voyage from Newcastle upon Tyne to Nyborg.
Mazeppa	United States	The fishing schooner was lost at Brace's Cove. Her crew were rescued.
Pellicano	Spain	The steamship was wrecked at Siniscola, Sardinia, Italy with the loss of three of her crew. She was on a voyage from Genoa, Italy to Barcelona.
Teviotdale	United Kingdom	The ship caught fire in the Indian Ocean and was abandoned. Her 26 crew took to the boats; they landed at Mauritius on 11 November. She was on a voyage from Dundee to Bombay, India.

== 3 November ==
List of shipwrecks: 3 November 1876
Ship	State	Description
Annie M. Young	Canada	The ship was driven ashore and wrecked at Bunbury, Western Australia.
Farwell	Norway	The brig ran aground in Holmöarna and was abandoned by her crew. She subsequently floated off and drifted out to sea. No further trace.
Geraldine	United Kingdom	The barque caught fire at Silivri, Ottoman Empire and was beached. Her crew were rescued. She was on a voyage from Liverpool, Lancashire to Constantinople, Ottoman Empire. She was a total loss.
Hesse-Darmstadt	United Kingdom	The barque was driven ashore at Ventava, Courland Governorate. Her crew were rescued.
Himalaya	United Kingdom	The steamship was driven ashore at the Yeni Kale Lighthouse, Russia. She was refloated.
Hurtig	Norway	The galiot was driven ashore at Agger, Denmark. Her crew were rescued. She was on a voyage from Kirkcaldy, Fife, United Kingdom to Kragerø.
Julia	United Kingdom	The schooner sprag a leak 5 nautical miles (9.3 km) south east of Sanda Island and was beached at Campbeltown, Argyllshire. She was on a voyage from Ayr to Carrickfergus, County Antrim.

== 4 November ==
List of shipwrecks: 4 November 1876
Ship	State	Description
Brazilian	United Kingdom	The steamship ran aground on the Shipwash Sand, in the North Sea off the coast of Suffolk. She was on a voyage from Newcastle upon Tyne, Northumberland to Marseille, Bouches-du-Rhône, France. She was refloated the next day with the assistance of two tugs and three smacks and was taken in to Harwich, Essex.
Edouard	United Kingdom	The ship was driven ashore by a tsunami in a cyclone at Chittagong, India.
Georges	United Kingdom	The ship was driven ashore by a tsunami in a cyclone at Chittagong.
Oceana	United Kingdom	The ship was driven ashore by a tsunami in a cyclone at Chittagong. She was subsequently destroyed by fire, the cause of which was found to be arson.
Trebziond	United Kingdom	The brig departed from Kronstadt, Russia for a British port. No further trace, presumed foundered with the loss of all nine crew.
Ville de Saint Servan	France	The barque was driven ashore on Langlade Island. Her crew were rescued. She was on a voyage from the Île de Ré, Charente-Inférieure to Saint-Pierre, Saint Pierre and Miquelon.

== 5 November ==
List of shipwrecks: 5 November 1876
Ship	State	Description
Brancepeth	United Kingdom	The steamship was driven ashore near Rixhöft, Germany with the loss of thirteen of her eighteen crew. Survivors were rescued by rocket apparatus. She was on a voyage from Kronstadt, Russia to Stettin, Germany.
Harry Morse	United States	The ship was driven ashore at Havre de Grâce, Seine-Inférieure, France. She was refloated and resumed her voyage.
Luiga Madre	Flag unknown	The ship ran aground on the Courland Bank. She was on a voyage from Queenstown, County Cork to Gloucester, United Kingdom. She was refloated and resumed her voyage.
Meika Jacoba	Netherlands	The ship was wrecked on Gotland, Sweden. Her crew survived. She was on a voyage from Rotterdam, South Holland to Gothenburg, Sweden.
Metropolitan	United Kingdom	The steamship ran aground in the IJ. She was on a voyage from Amsterdam, North Holland, Netherlands to London.
Oralda	Austria-Hungary	The barque caught fire at sea and was abandoned by her crew, who were rescued by the schooner E. C. T. (United Kingdom). Oralda was on a voyage from Dordrecht, South Holland, Netherlands to New Orleans, Louisiana, United States.
Orenoque	France	The steamship ran aground at "La Maréchale".
Prado	United Kingdom	The steamship ran aground on the Goodwin Sands, Kent. She was on a voyage from Antwerp, Belgium to Genoa, Italy. She was refloated.
St. Lawrence	United Kingdom	The transport ship was wrecked on Paternoster Rocks, off Cape Paternoster, Cape Colony. All on board, her crew and 618 passengers, were rescued by HMS Active, HMS Spartan and HMS Spiteful (all Royal Navy).
Theresa	Germany	The ship sank off Zerel, Saaremaa, Russia. She was on a voyage from London, United Kingdom to Riga, Russia.

== 6 November ==
List of shipwrecks: 6 November 1876
Ship	State	Description
Delia O. Yates	United States	The ship collided with the steamship West Indian (United Kingdom) and sank in the Irish Sea. Her crew were rescued. Delia O. Yates was on a voyage from Liverpool, Lancashire, United Kingdom to Cuba.
HMS Dryad	Royal Navy	The Amazon-class sloop ran aground at Halifax, Nova Scotia, Canada. She was refloated.
Henrik	Denmark	The brig foundered in the North Sea. Her crew were rescued by the barque Harrington (United Kingdom).
Lapwing	Canada	The ship ran aground on the West Rocks, in the North Sea off the coast of Essex, United Kingdom. She was on a voyage from Rotterdam, South Holland, Netherlands to New Calabar. She was refloated and towed in to Harwich, Essex.
Lea	United Kingdom	The schooner was driven ashore on Bawdsey Island, Pembrokeshire. She was on a voyage from Glasgow, Renfrewshire to Rouen, Seine-Inférieure, France. She subsequently became a wreck.
Lyckan	Sweden	The schooner was driven ashore at "Langor". Her crew were rescued. She was on a voyage from Kolding, Denmark to Oscarshamn.
Norwood	United Kingdom	The ship ran aground in the Yangon River. She was refloated and resumed her voyage.
Petrie	Germany	The barque caught fire and was abandoned in the Atlantic Ocean. Her crew were rescued by Hebe and John Good (both United Kingdom). Petrie was on a voyage from Liverpool to Miramichi, New Brunswick, Canada.
Phoebe	United Kingdom	The smack was wrecked on the Cross Sand, in the North Sea off the coast of Norfolk. Her six crew were rescued by the Caister Lifeboat Godsend ( Royal National Lifeboat Institution).
Robert	Sweden	The barque was driven ashore at "Market Södra Qvarkew".
Sampan	Norway	The barque was driven ashore and wrecked at Fredrikshavn, Denmark. She was on a voyage from Riga, Russia to Dieppe, Seine-Inférieure, France.

== 7 November ==
List of shipwrecks: 7 November 1876
Ship	State	Description
Anais	France	The ship was wrecked on the Muemba Reef, north east of Zanzibar. She was on a voyage from Cardiff, Glamorgan, United Kingdom to Zanzibar.
Britannia	Germany	The brig ran aground at Naveren, Norway and was abandoned by her crew. She drove ashore at "Falsroda" and was wrecked.
Dorothea	Denmark	The schooner was run ashore in the River Carron to avoid a collision with a steamship. She was refloated.
Else Johanna	Denmark	The koff sank at Holmstad, Norway. Two of her crew were unaccounted for. Survivors were rescued by a Norwegian barque.
Lizzie	United Kingdom	The schooner was wrecked at Port Nova, Nova Scotia, Canada. Her crew were rescued.
Maas	United Kingdom	The steamship ran aground in the Old Vlie. She was on a voyage from London to Harlingen, Friesland, Netherlands. She was refloated on 11 November and completed her voyage.
Primrose	United Kingdom	The smack ran aground on the Dogger Bank, in the Irish Sea off the coast of County Wexford. She was on a voyage from Dublin to Wexford. She was refloated with assistance.
HMS Tamar	Royal Navy	The troopship was driven ashore at St. Catherine's Point, Bermuda. Her troops were landed and she was refloated.
Trebizond	United Kingdom	The brig was driven ashore on Læsø, Denmark with the loss of all nine crew. She was on a voyage from Saint Petersburg, Russia to an English port.
Vencedora	United Kingdom	The barque caught fire at sea and was abandoned. All on board were rescued. She was on a voyage from Cardiff, Glamorgan to Valparaíso, Chile.
Vigilantia	Germany	The ship was driven ashore and wrecked on Skagen, Denmark. Her crew were rescued.

== 8 November ==
List of shipwrecks: 8 November 1876
Ship	State	Description
Advance	Sweden	The brig was driven ashore and wrecked at Nexø, Denmark. She was on a voyage from Härnösand to Grimsby, Lincolnshire, United Kingdom.
Aretas	United Kingdom	The schooner was driven ashore and wrecked on Terschelling, Friesland, Netherlands with the loss of five of her six crew. She was on a voyage from Portmadoc, Caernarfonshire to Hamburg, Germany.
Buckhorn	United Kingdom	The ship departed from Saint Helena for a British port. No further trace, presumed foundered with the loss of all sixteen crew. A vessel reported by Louise and Marguerite (Flag unknown) to have been seen on fire on 24 February 1877 was thought to have been Buckhorn.
Cesarewna	Russia	The ship was driven ashore at "Skaellof", on the east coast of Öland, Sweden.. She was on a voyage from Kronstadt to Copenhagen, Denmark.
Creolo	Norway	The ship was driven ashore and wrecked on Læsø, Denmark. Her crew were rescued.
Dunchattan	United Kingdom	The ship was driven ashore at Aberdeen. Her crew were rescued. She was on a voyage from Sunderland, County Durham to Inverness.
Elfemia	Belgium	The ship was driven ashore at "Noesly", on the east coast of Öland. She was on a voyage from Riga, Russia to Antwerp.
Essex	United Kingdom	The brigantine was driven ashore and wrecked at Great Yarmouth, Norfolk. Her crew were rescued by rocket apparatus. She was on a voyage from Sunderland, County Durham to Zierikzee, Zeeland, Netherlands.
Governor	United Kingdom	The brig was driven ashore and wrecked at Nexø. She was on a voyage from Vyborg, Grand Duchy of Finland to Hartlepool, County Durham.
Habinfane	Russia	The schooner was wrecked on the Black Sea coast near the entrance to the Bosphorus. Her crew were rescued.
Harald Hildesand	Sweden	The brig was driven ashore and wrecked at Nexø. She was on a voyage from Piteå to Neustadt in Holstein, Germany.
Hoppet	Germany	The ship was driven ashore near "Melbreda". She was on a voyage from Oskarshamn, Sweden to Kiel.
Johanna	Denmark	The ship was driven ashore near "Kœlla", on the west coast of Öland. She was on a voyage from Copenhagen to Westervik, Sweden.
Lisbeth	Netherlands	The ship was driven ashore at "Alfvara". She was on a voyage from Narva, Russia to Amsterdam, North Holland.
Lydia	Denmark	The ship was driven ashore near "Hasby". She was on a voyage from Copenhagen to Stockholm, Sweden.
Mary Ann Curry	United Kingdom	The barque was driven ashore at "Hvalsroes", on the east coast of Öland. She was on a voyage from Kronstadt to Copenhagen. She subsequently became a wreck.
Mathias	Germany	The ship was driven ashore at "Hvalsroes". She was on a voyage from Lübeck to Rauma, Grand Duchy of Finland.
Primus	Sweden	The ship was driven ashore at "Hvalsroes". She was on a voyage from Lübeck to Gamla Carleby.
Proteus	Netherlands	The ship was abandoned on the Dogger Bank with the loss of a crew member. Survivors were rescued by the smack Tricolour (United Kingdom). Plotus was on a voyage from Peterhead, Aberdeenshire, United Kingdom to Stettin, Germany.
Valkyren	Russia	The ship was driven ashore near Aalborg, Denmark. She was on a voyage from Liepāja to London, United Kingdom.
Voorwarts	Netherlands	The ship was driven ashore at "Ekelsudde", on the west coast of Öland. She was on a voyage from Nyland, Sweden to Harlingen, Friesland.

== 9 November ==
List of shipwrecks: 9 November 1876
Ship	State	Description
Agos Gerassimos	Russia	The brig collided with the steamship Sibylla (United Kingdom) and sank in the Bosphorus. Her crew were rescued.
Anna	Sweden	The ship put in to Copenhagen, Denmark in a waterlogged condition. She was on a voyage from Gävle to Odense, Denmark.
Bommerang	Sweden	The barque was driven ashore and wrecked on Læsø, Denmark.
Concordia	Sweden	The ship was driven ashore and wrecked on Læsø.
Caroline	United Kingdom	The schooner was driven ashore on Great Cumbrae, Argyllshire. She was on a voyage from Ardrossan, Ayrshire to Cardiff, Glamorgan.
Gabrielle	France	The schooner was driven ashore and wrecked on Læsø.
Govenor	United Kingdom	The ship was driven ashore and wrecked on Bornholm, Denmark. She was on a voyage from Vyborg, Grand Duchy of Finland to West Hartlepool, County Durham.
Harald Haarfanger	Sweden	The ship was driven ashore and wrecked on Bornholm. She was on a voyage from Piteå to Neustadt in Holstein, Germany.
Honorine	France	The barque ran aground on the Middelgrund. She was later refloated.
Loch Lomond	United Kingdom	The brig was wrecked on the Falstaker Reef, in the Baltic Sea. Her crew were rescued by a Finnish barque. She was on a voyage from Kronstadt, Russia to North Shields, Northumberland.
Marie	Norway	The barque was driven ashore and wrecked on Læsø.
Martinaux	United Kingdom	The barque was wrecked at "Kara Burnu", Ottoman Empire with the loss of her captain. Two crew were reported to have been rescued. She was on a voyage from Nicolaieff, Russia to a British port.
Martina	Sweden	The ship was driven ashore and wrecked at Olsäng. She was on a voyage from Sundsvall to Nyborg, Denmark.
Napoleon	United Kingdom	The schooner was driven ashore and wrecked west of Inishowen Head, County Donegal.
Search	United Kingdom	The brig departed from Safi, Morocco for an English port. No further trace, presumed foundered with the loss of all six crew.
Solitude	Norway	The ship was driven ashore on Læsø, Denmark. She was on a voyage from Fredericia, Denmark to Newcastle upon Tyne, Northumberland, United Kingdom. She was refloated and taken in to Helsingør, Denmark.
Telegraf	Norway	The brig ran aground in Taarbak Sound. She was on a voyage from Söderhamn, Sweden to Southampton, Hampshire, United Kingdom. She was later refloated.
Therese	Norway	The barque was abandoned in the Atlantic Ocean. Her crew were rescued by Sigurd (United States). Therese was on a voyage from Quebec City, Canada to London, United Kingdom.

== 10 November ==
List of shipwrecks: 10 November 1876
Ship	State	Description
Albicore	United Kingdom	The steamship ran aground in the River Carron. She was on a voyage from Grangemouth, Stirlingshire to Rotterdam, South Holland, Netherlands.
Argo	United Kingdom	The ship was driven ashore at Strandtorp, Öland, Sweden. She was on a voyage from Kronstadt, Russia to Hull, Yorkshire.
Arica	United Kingdom	The smack was driven ashore and wrecked at Swanage, Dorset. Her crew were rescued by the Swanage Lifeboat Charlotte Mary ( Royal National Lifeboat Institution).
Bethlehem	Flag unknown	The ship was driven ashore at "Moerby", on the east coast of Öland. She was on a voyage from Loviisa, Grand Duchy of Finland to Lübeck, Germany.
Clutha	United Kingdom	The steamship ran aground in the River Carron. She was on a voyage from Grangemouth to London.
Elise Linck	Germany	The barque collided with the steamship Uranus (Germany) and sank off Beachy Head, Sussex, United Kingdom. Her crew were rescued. Elise Linck was on a voyage from London, United Kingdom to Doboy, Georgia, United States.
Elize	Germany	The ship was driven ashore on Hirsholmene, Denmark. She was on a voyage from Sundsvall, Sweden to Littlehampton, Sussex, United Kingdom.
Elsie Linck	Germany	The barque collided with the steamship Euphrates (Germany) and in the English Channel 1 nautical mile (1.9 km) south west of the Royal Sovereign Lightship ( Trinity House). Her fourteen crew were rescued by Euphrates. Elsie Linck was on a voyage from London, United Kingdom to "Deboy".
Lammermuir	United Kingdom	The clipper had departed Adelaide, South Australia for London. No further trace, presumed foundered with the loss of all hands.
Meta	Sweden	The ship was driven ashore on the east coast of Öland. She was on a voyage from Söderköping to Stockton-on-Tees, County Durham, United Kingdom.
Nine	Sweden	The ship was driven ashore on the east coast of Öland. She was on a voyage from Sundsvall to Stockton-on-Tees.
Norham	United Kingdom	The barque was driven ashore at "Cocre Thili", near Kertch, Russia. She was refloated with assistance and resumed her voyage.
Otac Miho	Austria-Hungary	The barque foundered in the Atlantic Ocean. Her crew were rescued by the brigantine Toro (Spain). Otac Miho was on a voyage from Baltimore, Maryland, United States to King's Lynn, Norfolk, United Kingdom.
Paragon	United Kingdom	The schooner was driven ashore and wrecked on Læsø, Denmark. She was on a voyage from Danzig, Germany to Sunderland, County Durham.
Prindsesse Eugenie	Norway	The brig was driven ashore and wrecked on Læsø.
Skylda	Sweden	The ship was driven ashore near "Oaxa", on the east coast of Öland. She was on a voyage from Sundsvall to Lübeck.
Sophie	(Russian Empire) Grand Duchy of Finland	The barque was driven ashore on Hirsholmene, Denmark. She was on a voyage from Rauma to Barcelona, Spain. She was refloated and towed in to Gothenburg, Sweden.
Sophie	Norway	The barque was driven ashore and wrecked on Læsø.
Stentor	United Kingdom	The steamship ran aground in the River Carron.
Thames	United Kingdom	The steamship sank at Holyhead, Anglesey.
Union	France	The brig was driven ashore and wrecked on Læsø.
Wave	United Kingdom	The ship struck a sunken wreck and was damaged. She was on a voyage from Memel, Germany to London. She put in to Copenhagen, Denmark for repairs.

== 11 November ==
List of shipwrecks: 11 November 1876
Ship	State	Description
Aid	France	The ship was driven ashore and wrecked in Start Bay. Her crew were rescued. She was on a voyage from Marseille, Bouches-du-Rhône to Antwerp, Belgium.
Aries	United Kingdom	The smack was driven ashore and wrecked at Swanage, Dorset. Her four crew were rescued.
Atrevida	Spain	The ship was driven ashore and wrecked at Cascais, Portugal. Her crew were rescued.
Aurora	United Kingdom	The brig sprang a leak and was beached at Musselwick, Pembrokeshire. She was on a voyage from Maryport, Cumberland to Swansea, Glamorgan.
Bessy	United Kingdom	The schooner capsized off Madeira.
Charlotte	Sweden	The ship ran aground on the Middelgrund. She was on a voyage from Sundsvall to Alexandria, Egypt. She was refloated and put in to Copenhagen, Denmark.
Clara	Germany	The schooner was driven ashore at Hablingbo, Gotland, Sweden. She was on a voyage from Kronstadt, Russia to Christiania, Norway. She was refloated with assistance and resumed her voyage.
Corinna, Maria, and Sip	United Kingdom; Sweden; Flag unknown	The steamship Corrina collided with the barque Maria at Cardiff and the ship Sip and ran aground. She was on a voyage from Cardiff to Gibraltar. She was refloated with the assistance of three tugs and put back to Cardiff. Maria was severely damaged. She was on a voyage from Dunkirk, Nord to Cardiff. Sip was severely damaged.
D'Artagnan	France	The brig was wrecked in Pegwell Bay. Her five crew were rescued by the North Deal Lifeboat Van Kook ( Royal National Lifeboat Institution).
Earl of Derby	United Kingdom	The ship ran ashore at Port Glasgow, Port Glasgow. She was on a voyage from Port Glasgow to Rio de Janeiro, Brazil.
Faith	United Kingdom	The barque was driven ashore at Macrihanish, Argyllshire. Her nineteen crew were rescued. She was on a voyage from Troon, Ayrshire to Pensacola, Florida, United States.
Fearnought	Germany	The barque was driven ashore and wrecked on Madeira with the loss of a crew member.
Fontes Pereira de Melio	Portugal	The schooner was driven ashore and wrecked on Madeira. Her crew were rescued.
Frej	Sweden	The barque was driven ashore on Læsø. She was refloated in early December and towed in to Fredrikshavn, Denmark.
Gebroeders	Belgium	The ship was driven ashore and wrecked on Hogland, Russia. Her crew were rescued. She was on a voyage from Saint Petersburg, Russia to Antwerp.
Gem, Kangeroo, Marcus Morham, Margaret, and Maria	United Kingdom; United Kingdom; United Kingdom; United Kingdom; France	The schooner Maria was driven from her moorings at the Mumbles, Glamorgan. She collided with the oyster smacks Gem, Kangeroo, Marcus Morham and Margaret, which all drove ashore.
George & Valentine	France	The schooner was driven ashore in Pegwell Bay. Her crew were rescued by the North Deal Lifeboat Van Kook ( Royal National Lifeboat Institution).
Gustaf	Sweden	The schooner was driven ashore on Læsø.
Hedvig Sophia	Sweden	The barque was wrecked in Pegwell Bay. Her twelve crew were rescued by the North Deal Lifeboat Van Kook ( Royal National Lifeboat Institution).
Johanne Augusta	Germany	The cutter was driven ashore on Læsø.
Laure	France	The schooner was driven ashore at Saint-Pierre-Quiberon with the loss of a crew member. Survivors were rescued by rocket apparatus. She was on a voyage from Redon, Ille-et-Vilaine to Cardiff, Glamorgan, United Kingdom.
Malabar	France	The schooner was driven ashore near Ellewoutsdijk, Zeeland, Netherlands.
Maria	France	The ship was driven ashore at Dungarvan, County Waterford, United Kingdom. She was on a voyage from the Bonny River, Lagos Colony to Queenstown, County Cork, United Kingdom.
Maria	Spain	The ship was driven ashore on the Isle of Bute, United Kingdom.
Marie	United Kingdom	The ship was driven ashore at Grenaa, Denmark. Her crew were rescued. She was on a voyage from Leith, Lothian to Grenaa.
Marie Madre	Italy	The barque foundered in the Mediterranean Sea with the loss of three lives. She was on a voyage from Cádiz, Spain to the River Plate.
Marine	Norway	The barque was driven ashore and wrecked at Mount Stuart House, Isle of Bute. All thirteen people on board were rescued.
Minnie	United Kingdom	The ship was driven ashore and wrecked on Öland, Sweden. She was on a voyage from Sundsvall, Sweden to Irvine, Ayrshire.
Navies	United Kingdom	The ship was driven ashore at Espoo, Grand Duchy of Finland. She was on a voyage from Kronstadt, Russia to London. She was refloated on 20 November and taken in to Espoo.
Neva	United Kingdom	The steamship was damaged by fire at Havre de Grâce, Seine-Inférieure, France.
Pater	Greece	The barque collided with the steamship Hurunui (United Kingdom) and sank in the Atlantic Ocean 14 nautical miles (26 km) west south west of the Eddystone Rocks, Cornwall, United Kingdom with the loss of eight of her eleven crew. Pater was on a voyage from Cyprus to London, United Kingdom.
Pieuvre	France	The smack was driven ashore at Monkhaven, Pembrokeshire, United Kingdom. Her crew were rescued. She was refloated on 18 November.
Sandviken	Netherlands	The barque, on voyage from Borgå, Grand Duchy of Finland to Edam, Netherlands with timber, was driven ashore on Læsø, Denmark and became a wreck.
Sante Francesco	United Kingdom	The schooner was driven ashore and severely damaged at Ramsgate, Kent. She was on a voyage from London to Cardiff, Glamorgan.
Silvan	Germany	The brig was driven ashore on Læsø.
Soratat	United Kingdom	The ship was wrecked on the Goodwin Sands, Kent. Her crew were rescued by the North Deal Lifeboat Van Kook ( Royal National Lifeboat Institution).
Theodosia	United Kingdom	The schooner was driven ashore and wrecked on Madeira. Her crew were rescued.
Triumph	United Kingdom	The Thames barge was driven ashore at Lowestoft, Suffolk. She was refloated and assisted in to Lowestoft.
Venture	Canada	The ship was wrecked at Escuminac .
Van Kook	Royal National Lifeboat Institution	The lifeboat was severely damaged whilst going to the assistance of D'Artagnan, George & Valentine (both France), Hedvig Sophia (Sweden) and Soratat (United Kingdom).
Vulcan	United Kingdom	The brig was driven ashore and wrecked at Gorleston, Suffolk. All ten people on board were rescued by the Gorleston Lifeboat Leicester ( Royal National Lifeboat Institution). Vulcan was on a voyage from Christiania, Norway to Faversham, Kent.
Z. J. Nielsen	United Kingdom	The ship was driven ashore on Læsø.
Unnamed	France	The lugger was wrecked on the Nore with the loss of a crew member.
Unnamed	United Kingdom	The fishing smack sank in the River Mersey. Her four crew were rescued by the Mersey Flat Bertie (United Kingdom).

== 12 November ==
List of shipwrecks: 12 November 1876
Ship	State	Description
Adler	Germany	The steamship was driven ashore at Thisted, Denmark. She was on a voyage from Elbing to Wilhelmshaven.
Baron Holberg	United Kingdom	The ship was towed in to Gothenburg, Sweden in a severely damaged and waterlogged condition. She was on a voyage from Sundsvall, Sweden to Inverness.
Bonnie Kate	United Kingdom	The ship was driven ashore at "Turup", Russia. She was on a voyage from Newcastle upon Tyne, Northumberland to Reval, Russia. She was refloated with assistance and taken in to Reval.
Christine	Denmark	The brig ran aground at Santo Domingo Tonalá, Mexico. She was refloated and taken in to Minatitlán, Mexico.
Dante	United Kingdom	The schooner capsized in the North Sea 30 nautical miles (56 km) off the German coast with the loss of two of her nine crew. Survivors were rescued by the steamship Parmatta (United Kingdom).
Dunedin	United Kingdom	The ship was destroyed by fire at sea. Her crew were rescued.
Erin	United Kingdom	The steamship ran aground on the Brake Sand. She was on a voyage from London to New York She was refloated and resumed her voyage.
Genoa	United Kingdom	The steamship foundered in the Bay of Biscay (32°32′N 9°40′W) with the loss of six of her 33 crew. Survivors were rescued by the brig Zio (United Kingdom). Genoa was on a voyage from Sulina, Ottoman Empire to Cork.
Gem	United Kingdom	The ship was abandoned off Campbeltown, Argyllshire. All five people on board were rescued by the Campbeltown Lifeboat John R. Ker ( Royal National Lifeboat Institution).
George and Elizabeth	United Kingdom	The brig was driven ashore at Bridlington, Yorkshire. Her crew were rescued by a coble. She was on a voyage from Caen, Calvados to Sunderland, County Durham.
Gleaner	United Kingdom	The schooner was driven ashore at Castletown, Isle of Man. Her three crew were rescued by the Castletown Lifeboat Commercial Traveller No. 2 ( Royal National Lifeboat Institution). Gleaner was subsequently refloated and taken in to Castletown.
Henry	United Kingdom	The schooner was wrecked on the Maplin Sand, in the North Sea off the coast of Essex.
Isabel	United Kingdom	The brig was driven ashore and wrecked at Skerries, County Dublin with the loss of one of her eight crew. Survivors were rescued by rocket apparatus. She was on a voyage from Riga, Russia to Dundalk, County Louth.
Lion	United Kingdom	The ketch collided with the steamship Elf and sank in the Humber off Stallingborough, Lincolnshire. Lion was on a voyage from London to Goole, Yorkshire. Elf failed to render assistance after the collision. Consequently, her captain's certificate was suspended for a year.
Oromocto	United Kingdom	The brigantine was went ashore in a gale at Rosslare, County Wexford, United Kingdom, after three of her crew were lost from the rigging. Her remaining crew were rescued by rocket apparatus. She was on a voyage from Liverpool, Lancashire to Saint John, New Brunswick, Canada. Oromocto was refloated in May 1877 and subsequently taken in tow for Liverpool.
Paul et Marie	France	The schooner was discovered abandoned in the Atlantic Ocean 20 nautical miles (37 km) north of the Seven Stones Reef, Cornwall, United Kingdom by the steamship Minerva (United Kingdom), which towed her in to Falmouth, Cornwall, United Kingdom.
Rob Roy	United Kingdom	The ship was driven ashore at "Petitza", on the coast of the White Sea 100 nautical miles (190 km) from Arkhangelsk, Russia. Her crew were rescued. Rob Roy was on a voyage from Arhchangelsk to Liverpool, Lancashire. She was a total loss.
Valeria	United Kingdom	The schooner was driven ashore and wrecked at Hartlepool, County Durham. Her crew were rescued. She was on a voyage from Great Yarmouth, Norfolk to Hartlepool.

== 13 November ==
List of shipwrecks: 13 November 1876
Ship	State	Description
Amaranth	Sweden	The barque was wrecked on the north east coast of Alderney, Channel Islands with the loss of all hands. She subsequently floated off and came ashore at Brixham, Devon in late November.
Baldur	Denmark	The schooner was abandoned off Coquet Island, Northumberland, United Kingdom. She was driven ashore and wrecked on Birling Car, near Alnmouth, Northumberland.
Camilla	United Kingdom	The brig was driven ashore at Blyth, Northumberland. Four of her five crew were rescued by the Blyth Lifeboat Salford ( Royal National Lifeboat Institution), the fifth by rocket apparatus. She was on a voyage from Great Yarmouth, Norfolk to Blyth.
Elise	Germany	The schooner foundered in the North Sea. Her six crew were rescued by the smack Falcon (United Kingdom). Elise was on a voyage from Charleston, South Carolina, United States to Brake.
Enterprise	United Kingdom	The brigantine sank off Berwick upon Tweed, Northumberland with the loss of all hands.
Forest Queen	United Kingdom	The ship was damaged in a hurricane at Lisbon, Portugal.
France	United Kingdom	The schooner was abandoned in the Atlantic Ocean (38°39′N 9°50′W). Her five crew were rescued by the steamship Canopus (United Kingdom). The steamship Sagunta (Spain) having taken a crew member off the previous day. France was on a voyage from Seville, Spain to Dunkirk, Nord.
Germ	United Kingdom	The ketch sprang a leak and sank off Hornsea, Yorkshire. All four people on board were rescued by the Hornsea Lifeboat. She was on a voyage from Harwich, Essex to Hull, Yorkshire.
Georgina	France	The barque was driven ashore on Læsø, Denmark and capsized.
Hetty	United Kingdom	The ship was damaged in a hurricane at Lisbon.
Leopold	Germany	The barque was driven ashore and wrecked on Madeira. Her crew were rescued.
Loch Lomond	United Kingdom	The ship ran aground at Falsterbo, Sweden and sank. She was on a voyage from Kronstadt, Russia to a port on the east coast of the United Kingdom.
Lyra	United Kingdom	The ship was damaged in a hurricane at Lisbon.
Maggie	United Kingdom	The ship was damaged in a hurricane at Lisbon.
Magnet	United Kingdom	The ship was damaged in a hurricane at Lisbon.
Mary	United Kingdom	The ship was damaged in a hurricane at Lisbon.
Myra	United Kingdom	The ship was damaged in a hurricane at Lisbon.
Nerio	United Kingdom	The ship was damaged in a hurricane at Lisbon.
Nordhavet	Norway	The ship was abandoned off Anholt. Her crew were rescued by the brig Zodiac (United Kingdom). Nordhavet was on a voyage from Västervik, Sweden to Antwerp, Belgium.
Phœbus	United Kingdom	The ship was driven ashore on Læsø. She was refloated with assistance and taken in to Fredrikshavn, Denmark.
Pitre Marie	France	The ship collided with another vessel and sank at Saint-Nazaire, Ille-et-Vilaine.
Polly	Russia	The lighter sank at Riga.
Salarvor	United Kingdom	The ship was damaged in a hurricane at Lisbon.
Sisters	United Kingdom	The ship was damaged in a hurricane at Lisbon.
Star of Peace	United Kingdom	The ship was damaged in a hurricane at Lisbon.
Stephanotis	Russia	The steamship was driven ashore at Kullagrundet, Sweden. She was on a voyage from Kronstadt to London, United Kingdom. She was refloated on 4 December and towed in to Copenhagen, Denmark for repairs.
St. Jean Baptiste	France	The ship ran aground on the Nore and sank with the loss of all hands.
Talarvor	United Kingdom	The ship was damaged in a hurricane at Lisbon.
Ur	Denmark	The schooner foundered in the Atlantic Ocean off Torres, Brazil. Her crew survived. She was on a voyage from Paranaguá, Brazil to Valparaíso, Chile.
Ville de Frontignan	France	The ship was driven ashore at "Port Cross". She was refloated and taken in to "Toklow" in a waterlogged condition.
Walsoken	United Kingdom	The schooner was driven ashore on Fårö, Sweden.
Wilhelmine	Germany	The abandoned brig was towed in to Fredrikshavn.
Unnamed	Flag unknown	The schooner foundered 7 nautical miles (13 km) off Johnshaven, Aberdeenshire, United Kingdom.
Unnamed	Flag unknown	The schooner was driven ashore and wrecked at Falmouth, Cornwall.
Seven unnamed vessels	Portugal	The lighters sank in a hurricane at Lisbon.

== 14 November ==
List of shipwrecks: 14 November 1876
Ship	State	Description
Anden	Norway	The barque was driven ashore and wrecked near Ny-Hellesund. Her crew were rescued. She was on a voyage from London, United Kingdom to Larvik.
Braemar	United Kingdom	The ship was abandoned in the Atlantic Ocean. Her crew were rescued by Edith (United Kingdom).
Caroline Agnes	United Kingdom	The barque was driven ashore and wrecked at Craig Point, 10 nautical miles (19 km) north of Montrose, Forfarshire with the loss of seven of her thirteen crew. She was on a voyage from South Shields, County Durham to New Orleans, Louisiana.
Constantine	United Kingdom	The ship collided with the steamship Stannington (United Kingdom) in the River Thames and was beached at East Tilbury, Essex.
Dart	United Kingdom	The schooner was driven ashore near Stonehaven, Aberdeenshire. Her four crew were rescued.
Drammen	Sweden	The ship ran aground on the Middle Sand, in the North Sea off the coast of Essex and broke her back. She was refloated with assistance from a number of smacks and found to be severely leaky.
Edith	United Kingdom	The brigantine was abandoned of The Lizard, Cornwall. Her crew were rescued. Edith was on a voyage from Garston, Lancashire to Brixham, Devon. She came ashore at Keneggy Downs, Cornwall.
Eliza	Germany	The schooner was abandoned in the North Sea. Her crew were rescued by the smack Falcon.
Emily	Germany	The ship ran aground on the Haisborough Sands, in the North Sea off the coast of Norfolk, United Kingdom. Her eleven crew were rescued by HMRC Adder ( Board of Customs). Emily was on a voyage from Ljusne, Sweden to London.
Insuland	Norway	The barque was driven ashore and wrecked at "Foxholes", between Hartlepool and Seaham, County Durham, United Kingdom with the loss of eight of her nine crew. She was on a voyage from Calais, France to Sandefjord.
Loch Lomond	United Kingdom	The ship sank at Falsterbo, Sweden. Her crew were rescued. She was on a voyage from Kronstadt, Russia to an English port.
Louisa	France	The ship was driven ashore at Le Verdon-sur-Mer, Gironde. She was refloated.
Paquebot de Quimper	France	The ship was driven ashore at Le Verdon-sur-Mer. She was refloated.
Reine des Anges	France	The ship was driven ashore at Le Verdon-sur-Mer. She was refloated.
Roberto	Canada	The ship was driven ashore and severely damaged at Portland, Dorset, United Kingdom. She was on a voyage from Halifax, Nova Scotia to Hull, Yorkshire, United Kingdom. She was refloated with the assistance of a tug.
Speculation	Norway	The barque was driven ashore and wrecked at Johnshaven, Aberdeenshire, United Kingdom with the loss of all nine crew.
Therese Victor	France	The ship was driven ashore near Aigues-Mortes, Gard. She was on a voyage from the Newfoundland Colony to Marseillle, Bouches-du-Rhône. She was refloated and towed in to Aigues-Mortes.
Ursa Minor	Sweden	The schooner collided with a steamship and foundered in the Baltic Sea off the Hammeren Lighthouse, Denmark with the loss of three of her six crew. She was on a voyage from Rønne, Denmark to Kalmar.
Unnamed	Flag unknown	The ship was driven ashore at Ballymoney, County Dublin, United Kingdom.
Unnamed	France	The schooner was driven ashore at "Saleen", County Dublin.
Unnamed	United Kingdom	The schooner was driven ashore at Arklow, County Wicklow, United Kingdom.

== 15 November ==
List of shipwrecks: 15 November 1876
Ship	State	Description
Ann Mary	United Kingdom	The schooner was driven ashore and wrecked in Broad Sound. Her three crew were rescued. She was on a voyage from Cardiff, Glamorgan to Holyhead, Anglesey.
Anthracite	United Kingdom	The brig ran aground at "Lanonville", Bouches-du-Rhône, France. She was on a voyage from London to Cette, Hérault, France.
Antini Sinai	France	The brigantine was driven ashore at Minerstown, County Down, United Kingdom. Her six crew were rescued by the Tyrella Lifeboat Memorial ( Royal National Lifeboat Institution). Antini Sinai was on a voyage from Nantes, Loire-Inférieure to Preston, Lancashire, United Kingdom.
Antona	United Kingdom	The steamship sank in the Clyde.
Babette	France	The steamship ran aground at Finkenwerder, Germany. She was on a voyage from Bordeaux, Gironde to Hamburg, Germany.
Betza	United Kingdom	The schooner ran aground on the Nidingen Reef, in the Baltic Sea. She was on a voyage from Helsingborg, Sweden to London. She was refloated and taken in to Gothenburg, Sweden in a leaky condition.
Britannia	United Kingdom	The steamship ran aground at Finkenwerder. She was on a voyage from Rotterdam, South Holland, Netherlands to Hamburg. She was refloated the next day and taken in to Hamburg.
City of Manchester	United Kingdom	The barque foundered off Akyab, Burma with the loss of 29 of her 31 crew. She was on a voyage from Liverpool, Lancashire to Calcutta, India.
Donna Isabel	United Kingdom	The steamship caught fire at London. The fire was extinguished with the assistance from a fireboat.
Evogina	Russia	The schooner was driven ashore on Great Wrangel. She was on a voyage from Saint Petersburg to Stockholm, Sweden.
Farmer	United Kingdom	The smack was driven ashore and wrecked near "Meal Cunningsburgh", Shetland Islands. Her crew were rescued.
Fenella	United Kingdom	The ship was driven ashore. She was on a voyage from Umeå, Sweden to London. She was refloated and out in to Copenhagen, Denmark.
Gosforth	United Kingdom	The steamship caught fire caught fire 2 nautical miles (3.7 km) south south east of Otranto, Italy. She was on a voyage from Newport, Monmouthshire to Brindisi, Italy.
Iris	France	The schooner was wrecked at Pornichet, Loire-Inférieure. Her crew survived.
Isabella	United Kingdom	The ship ran aground at Finkenwerder. She was on a voyage from Rotterdam to Hamburg. She was refloated the next day and taken in to Hamburg.
Joseph	France	The schooner was driven ashore and wrecked at Saint-Pierre-Quiberon, Morbihan. Her crew were rescued.
Lepenstrath	United Kingdom	The barque was driven ashore at Corrie, Isle of Arran. She was refloated on 19 November.
Lord Clive	United Kingdom	The steamship caught fire at Liverpool. The fire was extinguished.
Mazagan	France	The brigantine was driven ashore near Bilbao, Spain.
Richard Cobden	Norway	The schooner foundered in the Baltic Sea off Reval, Russia. Her crew were rescued by a British steamship. She was on a voyage from Stavanger to Reval.
Suzanne	Germany	The barque was abandoned in the North Sea. Her crew were rescued by a British smack. She was on a voyage from Fredrikshavn, Denmark to Rouen, Seine-Inférieure, France. Suzanne was towed in to Grimsby, Lincolnshire, United Kingdom by the smacks Dr. Lees and Teaser (both United Kingdom).
Thérèse Victor	France	The ship was wrecked at "Lanonville".
Usworth	United Kingdom	The steamship ran aground at Finkenwerder. She was on a voyage from Sunderland, County Durham to Hamburg. She was refloated and completed her voyage.
Unnamed	Persia	The lighter sank at Bushire.

== 16 November ==
List of shipwrecks: 16 November 1876
Ship	State	Description
Evin Home	United Kingdom	The steamship ran aground on the Cockle Sand, in the North Sea off the coast of Norfolk. She was on a voyage from Rotterdam, South Holland, Netherlands to the River Tyne. Evin Home was refloated and beached at Winterton-on-Sea, Norfolk. She was later refloated and resumed her voyage.
Jacobus Daird	Netherlands	The galiot was in collision with another vessel and was severely damaged. Her crew were rescued by Stranger (United Kingdom). Jacobus Daird was on a voyage from Amsterdam, North Holland to Karlskrona, Sweden. She was consequently condemned.
Janaro, or Tanoro	United Kingdom	The brig departed from Newport, Monmouthshire for Huelva, Spain. No further trace, presumed foundered with the loss of all hands.
John and Eliza	United Kingdom	The pilot boat was run down and sunk off Nash Point, Glamorgan by the steamsbip Ventnor (United Kingdom) with the loss of two of the three people on board. The survivor was rescued by Ventnor.
Lady Anne	United Kingdom	The steamship was driven ashore and wrecked at Souter Point, Northumberland. Her crew were rescued by the Coastguard using rocket apparatus. She was on a voyage from Southampton, Hampshire to Sunderland, County Durham.
Warkworth Castle	United Kingdom	The steamship was driven ashore at Cullercoats, Northumberland. Her 25 crew were rescued by rocket apparatus. She was on a voyage from London to Sunderland, County Durham.
Île d'Yeu Lifeboat	France	The lifeboat capsized with the loss of two of her crew whilst going to the assistance of a vessel in distress.

== 17 November ==
List of shipwrecks: 17 November 1876
Ship	State	Description
Peterel	United Kingdom	The schooner was wrecked near Montrose, Forfarshire. Her crew were rescued by rocket apparatus. She was on a voyage from Margate, Kent to Hartlepool, County Durham.
Princesse Clotilde	France	The ship foundered in the Bay of Biscay. She was on a voyage from La Tremblade, Charente-Inférieure to Bayonne, Basses-Pyrénées.
Raundrutt	Norway	The barque struck floating wreckage and sank in the Atlantic Ocean 60 nautical miles (110 km) west south west of Cape Clear Island, County Cork. All on board took to a boat; they were rescued the next day by Nelson (United Kingdom). Raindrop was on a voyage from Baltimore, Maryland, United States to Larne, County Antrim.
Reintje	Netherlands	The barque was abandoned in the North Sea. Her crew were rescued by the smack Foam (United Kingdom). Reintje was on a voyage from Sundsvall, Sweden to the Nieuwe Diep. She was towed into the River Tyne in a waterlogged condition by tow tugs.
Robert Keddie	United Kingdom	The schooner was driven ashore at Spittal Point, Northumberland. She was on a voyage from King's Lynn, Norfolk to Berwick upon Tweed, Northumberland. She was refloated the next day.
Rosarto	Sweden	The brig was wrecked at Helsingør, Denmark. She was on a voyage from Sundsvall to Delfzijl, Groningen, Netherlands.
Ruby	United Kingdom	The schooner ran aground and sank in the Queens Channel, at the mouth of the River Mersey. Her three crew were rescued. She was on a voyage from Plymouth, Devon to Runcorn, Cheshire.
Statesman	United Kingdom	The barque was driven ashore and severely damaged in the River Tweed. She was on a voyage from Söderhamn, Sweden to Berwick upon Tweed. She was refloated the next day.

== 18 November ==
List of shipwrecks: 18 November 1876
Ship	State	Description
Doctor von Thunew Tellow,	Germany	The ship was driven ashore at Withernsea, Yorkshire, United Kingdom. Her crew were rescued. She was on a voyage from Riga, Russia to Grimsby, Lincolnshire, United Kingdom.
George	Denmark	The brig was driven ashore at Blyth, Northumberland, United Kingdom. Her seven crew were rescued. She was on a voyage from Söderhamn, Sweden to Hartlepool, County Durham, United Kingdom.
Hannibal	Germany	The barque ran aground at Hartley, Northumberland. She was on a voyage from Piteå, Sweden to West Hartlepool, County Durham. She was refloated on 20 November and towed in to West Hartlepool in a waterlogged condition.
Hugh Streatfield	United Kingdom	The steamship was driven ashore on Heligoland. She was on a voyage from Sunderland, County Durham to Hamburg, Germany. She was refloated.
Paul Wiertsema	Netherlands	The ship was driven ashore at Asdal, Norway. Her crew were rescued. She was on a voyage from Riga to Hoogezand, Groningen.
Sampson	United Kingdom	The barque was driven ashore and wrecked near Fredrikshavn, Denmark. She was on a voyage from Riga to Dieppe, Seine-Inférieure, France
Tamantipas	United Kingdom	The steamship caught fire at Newport, Monmouthshire. The fire was extinguished.

== 19 November ==
List of shipwrecks: 19 November 1876
Ship	State	Description
Amelia	(Russian Empire) Grand Duchy of Finland	The ship was driven ashore and wrecked at Nesting, Shetland Islands, United Kingdom. Her crew were rescued.
Anglia	United Kingdom	The steamship ran aground on the Park Dykes Reef, off Emmanuel Head, Lindisfarne, Northumberland. She was on a voyage from Dundee, Forfarshire to London. She was refloated with the assistance of the steamships Harvest Queen and Martin (both United Kingdom), which towed her in to Dundee.
Barrasford	United Kingdom	The steamship was driven ashore near "Bramly", on the east coast of Öland, Sweden. She was on a voyage from Liepāja, Russia to Schiedam, South Holland, Netherlands.
Julius Degner	Germany	The schooner was driven ashore at Swinemünde. She was on a voyage from Swinemünde to Grangemouth, Stirlingshire, United Kingdom. She was refloated with assistance and taken in to Swinemünde for repairs.
Kammerdirector von Flotow	Sweden	The ship was driven ashore and wrecked at Dimlington, Yorkshire, United Kingdom. She was on a voyage from Söderhamn to Hull, Yorkshire.
Nelson	United Kingdom	The ship was lost off "Bic". She was on a voyage from a Baltic port to an English port.
Robert Hellyer	United Kingdom	The smack was driven ashore at Out Newton, Yorkshire.
Thankful	United Kingdom	The brig struck a sunken rock at Svanesund, Sweden. She was on a voyage from Malmö to Gothenburg. She was towed in to Uddevalla in a leaky condition.
Unnamed	Flag unknown	The ship, a barque or a brig, was driven ashore at Barnes Chine, Isle of Wight, United Kingdom in a capsized condition. She was a total loss.

== 20 November ==
List of shipwrecks: 20 November 1876
Ship	State	Description
Birger	United States	The ship ran aground in the Scheldt. She was on a voyage from Philadelphia, Pennsylvania to Antwerp, Belgium. She was refloated with the assistance of a number of tugs and taken in to Antwerp.
Burgermeister Kellstein	Germany	The ship was driven ashore in the River Thames at East Tilbury, Essex, United Kingdom. She was on a voyage from Wilmington, North Carolina to London, United Kingdom.
Delloye Matthieu	Belgium	The steamship was driven ashore at Östergarnsholm, Sweden with the loss of eleven of her crew. She was on a voyage from Kronstadt, Russia to Antwerp.
Donygall	United Kingdom	The ship foundered in the Irish Sea off the coast of County Waterford with loss of life.
Elena	United Kingdom	The barque ran aground on a rock near Ny-Hellesund, Norway. Her crew were rescued. She was on a voyage from Copenhagen, Denmark to Peterhead, Aberdeenshire. She was refloated in early December and towed in to "Bioritigern".
J. D. Peters	United States	The ship ran aground in the Scheldt. She was on a voyage from San Francisco, California to Antwerp. She was refloated with the assistance of a number of tugs and taken in to Antwerp.
Kitty	United Kingdom	The ship foundered off the coast of County Waterfod.
HMS Lapwing	Royal Navy	The Plover-class gunvessel was driven ashore and severely damaged in the "Minoltas Islands", in the Gulf of Pe-chi-li. She was later refloated.
Laurel	United Kingdom	The abandoned schooner was driven ashore and wrecked at St Combs, Aberdeenshire.
Marco Polo	United Kingdom	The Yorkshire Billyboy ran aground and sank at Clee Ness, Lincolnshire. Her crew survived. She was on a voyage from Aldeburgh, Suffolk to Hull, Yorkshire.
Medina	United Kingdom	The schooner capsized and sank at Liverpool.
Meg	United Kingdom	The brigantine departed from the Newfoundland Colony for Sligo. No further trace, reported missing.
Narcisse	France	The ship ran aground in the Gironde at Pauillac, Gironde. She was on a voyage from Cardiff, Glamorgan, United Kingdom to Bordeaux, Gironde. She was refloated and resumed her voyage.
Octavia	Norway	The barque was driven ashore at St Combs. Her ten crew were rescued by the Fraserburgh Lifeboat Charlotte ( Royal National Lifeboat Institution).
Pellegrina	United Kingdom	The ship ran aground at Liverpool, Lancashire. She was on a voyage from Alexandria, Egypt to Liverpool. She was refloated.
Pleiades	United Kingdom	The ship ran aground at New Brighton, Cheshire. She was on a voyage from Richibucto, New Brunswick, Canada to Birkenhead, Cheshire. She was refloated and taken in to Birkenhead.
Plixavra	Greece	The ship ran aground at Hayle, Cornwall, United Kingdom. She was on a voyage from Almería, Spain to Falmouth, Cornwall.
Rapid	United Kingdom	The ship was driven ashore and wrecked at Kinnaird Head, Aberdeenshire. Her crew were rescued.
Viking	United Kingdom	The steamship was driven ashore in the River Thames at East Tilbury.
Waterhen	United Kingdom	The brig was driven ashore on Amrum, Germany. She was on a voyage from Montreal, Quebec, Canada to Hamburg, Germany. She was refloated and resumed her voyage.
Zia Pellegrina	United Kingdom	The ship ran aground at Liverpool. She was on a voyage from Alexandria, Egypt to Liverpool. She was refloated.
Unnamed	Flag unknown	The schooner ran aground on the Jordan Flats, in Liverpool Bay.

== 21 November ==
List of shipwrecks: 21 November 1876
Ship	State	Description
Alice Moor	United Kingdom	The ship ran aground on the Shoebury Sand, in the Thames Estuary. She was on a voyage from Falmouth, Cornwall to London. She was refloated with assistance.
Bree	(Russian Empire) Grand Duchy of Finland	The brig foundered off Bressay, Shetland Islands, United Kingdom with the loss of all hands. Bree was on a voyage from Grimsby, Lincolnshire, United Kingdom to a Swedish port.
Blythwood	United Kingdom	The steamship ran aground at Ochakiv, Russia. She was on a voyage from Nicholaieff, Russia to a British port.
Frances Lewey	United States	The brigantine collided with the steamship Leonor (United Kingdom) and sank with the loss of six lives. Frances Lewey was on a voyage from Niuzhuang (Niuchang) to Xiamen (Amoy), China.
Freya	Germany	The barque was driven ashore on the coast of Northumberland, United Kingdom.
H. P. Nielson	Sweden	The ship was driven ashore and wrecked on Læsø, Denmark. she was on a voyage from Hartlepool, County Durham, United Kingdom to Gothenburg.
James Groves	United Kingdom	The steamship collided with the barque Vater (Norway) and sank in the English Channel 4 nautical miles (7.4 km) off the Royal Sovereign Lightship ( Trinity House). Her eighteen crew were rescued by the brig Bernuda (Netherlands). James Groves was on a voyage from Sulina, Ottoman Empire to Leith, Lothian.
Jonge Willem	Netherlands	The ship was wrecked at Fredrikshavn, Denmark. She was on a voyage from Charlestown, Cornwall to Fredrikstad, Norway.
Louis Joseph	France	The brig was wrecked at Bilbao, Spain. She was on a voyage from Cardiff, Glamorgan, United Kingdom to Bilbao.
Magnolia	United States	The ship ran aground on the Diamond Reef. She was on a voyage from Savannah, Georgia to New York.
Mathilde	Germany	The schooner was abandoned 16 nautical miles (30 km) off the Scottish coast. Her crew were rescued.
New Blessing	United Kingdom	The ship was driven ashore at Dunkirk, Nord, France. She was on a voyage from Gothenburg, Sweden to Falmouth, Cornwall. She was refloated and towed in to Dunkirk.
Sunbeam	United Kingdom	The barque was driven ashore at Ocean City, North Carolina, United States. She was on a voyagge from Londonderry to Baltimore, Maryland, United States.

== 22 November ==
List of shipwrecks: 22 November 1876
Ship	State	Description
Bonne Sophie	France	The ship was driven ashore at Seamill, Ayrshire, United Kingdom. Her crew were rescued She was on a voyage from Bayonne, Basses-Pyrénées to Glasgow, Renfrewshire, United Kingdom.
Monhegan	United States	The ship caught fire at New Orleans, Louisiana.
Osmo	Russia	The schooner was driven ashore on Terschelling, Friesland, Netherlands. She was on a voyage from Pori, Grand Duchy of Finland to Valencia, Spain. She was refloated on 26 November.
Northern Star	United Kingdom	The ship was driven ashore south of Girvan, Ayrshire. She was on a voyage from Dublin to Ayr.
Star of the West	United Kingdom	The smack was wrecked on Fair Isle. Her crew were rescued.
St. Peder	Norway	The full-rigged ship was driven ashore on the west coast of Iona, Inner Hebrides, United Kingdom. Her crew were rescued. She was on a voyage from Quebec City, Canada to Greenock, Renfrewshire. She was refloated on 25 November.

== 23 November ==
List of shipwrecks: 23 November 1876
Ship	State	Description
Adam von Koss	Germany	The ship collided with the barque Gulow (Norway) and sank in the North Sea with the loss of a crew member. Survivors were rescued by Gulow. Adam von Koss was on a voyage from Newcastle upon Tyne, Northumberland, United Kingdom to Wismar.
Courier de Bombay	France	The ship was wrecked at Réunion. She was on a voyage from Réunion to Marseille, Bouches-du-Rhône.
Glannibanter	United Kingdom	The steamship was driven ashore at Vlissingen, Zeeland, Netherlands. She was on a voyage from Sunderland, County Durham to Antwerp, Belgium.
John	United Kingdom	The Mersey Flat collided with the steamship Algeria (United Kingdom) and sank in the River Mersey.
San Francisco	Norway	The brig was abandoned in the Dogger Bank. Her crew were rescued by a Danish vessel. She was on a voyage from Spain to Norway.
Santa Margarita	Italy	The ship was wrecked at Porto-Longone, Elba. Her crew were rescued.

== 24 November ==
List of shipwrecks: 24 November 1876
Ship	State	Description
Cito	Germany	The schooner foundered at sea with the loss of a crew member.
Foyle	United Kingdom	The steamship collided with a Russian barque and foundered in the Bristol Channel off the Mumbles, Glamorgan. Her crew were rescued. She was on a voyage from Newport, Monmouthshire to Dublin. Foyle was refloated on 4 December and taken in to Swansea, Glamorgan.
Hilda	Portugal	The barque sprang a leak and foundered in the Atlantic Ocean 80 or 90 nautical miles (150 or 170 km) off Cape Espichel. Her crew survived. She was on a voyage from London, United Kingdom to Rio de Janeiro, Brazil.
Kertch	United Kingdom	The steamship was lost at Sulina, Ottoman Empire.
Margaret Campbell	United Kingdom	The schooner was driven ashore and wrecked on Gigha, Inner Hebrides.
Marseilles	United Kingdom	The barque collided with the clipper Maulesden (United Kingdom) and sank in the Atlantic Ocean. Her crew were rescued by Maulesden. Marseilles was on a voyage from London to Moulmein, Burma.

== 25 November ==
List of shipwrecks: 25 November 1876
Ship	State	Description
Amine	United Kingdom	The brig was driven ashore and wrecked 1 nautical mile (1.9 km) south of Walmer Castle, Kent. Her crew were rescued.
Gustave	France	The schooner was driven ashore and wrecked at Deal, Kent. Her crew were rescued by rocket apparatus.
Haabet	Norway	The barque was driven ashore and wrecked 1 nautical mile (1.9 km) south of Walmer Castle. Her twelve crew were rescued by rocket apparatus. She was on a voyage from Kragerø to Bristol, Gloucestershire, United Kingdom.
Hanna	Sweden	The barque collided with another vessel and was abandoned in the North Sea. She was discovered by two smacks and was towed into the River Tyne with the assistance of a steamship.
Hero	United Kingdom	The ship was wrecked on the Goodwin Sands. Her crew were rescued by the Margate Lifeboat Friend of all Nations or Quiver (both Royal National Lifeboat Institution).
James and Mary	(United Kingdom of Great Britain and Ireland) Guernsey	The dandy foundered off Cap La Hougue, Manche, France. Her crew were rescued. She was on a voyage from a Scottish port to Saint-Brieuc, Côtes-du-Nord, France.
Jean Cameron	United Kingdom	The schooner was wrecked near Margate, Kent.
Lizzie Bovill	Sweden	The ship was damaged by fire at Sundsvall.
Mohely	United Kingdom	The brig was driven ashore 1 nautical mile (1.9 km) south of Walmer Castle. Her crew were rescued.
Pardo	United Kingdom	The steamship departed from Saigon, French Indo-China for Hong Kong. No further trace, presumed foundered with the loss of all 24 crew.
Queen	United Kingdom	The ship was driven into Deal Pier and was wrecked with the loss of three of her six crew. She was on a voyage from South Shields, County Durham to Dartmouth, Devon.
République	France	The brigantine was driven ashore 1 nautical mile (1.9 km) south of Walmer Castle with the loss of all but two of her crew.
Star of the Ocean	United Kingdom	The brig was driven ashore at 1 nautical mile (1.9 km) south of Walmer Castle. Her crew were rescued.
Unnamed	United Kingdom	The barge was run into by the steamship Good Hope (United Kingdom) and sank at Blackwall, Middlesex.

== 26 November ==
List of shipwrecks: 26 November 1876
Ship	State	Description
Coursier	United Kingdom	The brig was abandoned in the Atlantic Ocean. Her crew were rescued. She was on a voyage from Charleston, South Carolina, United States to Newcastle upon Tyne, Northumberland.
Emily	Norway	The ship departed from Tayport, Fife, United Kingdom for Christiania. No further trace, presumed foundered with the loss of all hands.
Henry	Norway	The barque collided with Benjamin Bangs (United Kingdom) and was beached on the Blythe Sand, in the River Thames. She was on a voyage from London, United Kingdom to a Norwegian port. She was refloated the next day and put back to London in a severely damaged condition.
Kirch	United Kingdom	The steamship was driven ashore and sank at Sulina, Ottoman Empire.
Reconnaissance	Italy	The barque was driven ashore at Cape Sabinal, Spain. She was on a voyage from Cardiff, Glamorgan to Barcelona, Spain.

== 27 November ==
List of shipwrecks: 27 November 1876
Ship	State	Description
Adventure	United Kingdom	The brig capsized in the River Tyne. Her crew were rescued by a tug.
Bewick	United Kingdom	The steamship ran aground near Hellevoetsluis, Zeeland, Netherlands.
Carl Bendurh	Germany	The schooner ran aground on the Shipwash Sand, in the North Sea off the coast of Suffolk, United Kingdom. She was on a voyage from Danzig to Bristol, Gloucestershire, United Kingdom. She was refloated and put in to Harwich, Essex, United Kingdom in a leaky condition.
Guiding Star	United Kingdom	The ship struck the Hendon Rock, on the coast of County Durham and was damaged. She was on a voyage from Sunderland, County Durham to Port Louis, Mauritius. She was refloated and put back to Sunderland in a leaky condition.
Othello	United Kingdom	The steamship was driven ashore at New York, United States. She was on a voyage from New York to Hull, Yorkshire. She was refloated and resumed her voyage.
Richard Emily	United Kingdom	The ship was driven ashore at Cherbourg, Manche, France. She was on a voyage from Amsterdam, North Holland, Netherlands to Guernsey, Channel Islands.
Riconoscente	Italy	The barque was driven ashore near "Roquielas", Spain.
Salacia	United Kingdom	The ship was wrecked at Shanghai, China.

== 28 November ==
List of shipwrecks: 28 November 1876
Ship	State	Description
Amalia Hillman	United Kingdom	The ship departed from West Hartlepool, County Durham for Danzig, Germany. No further trace, presumed foundered with the loss of all hands.
Blair Drummond	United Kingdom	The full-rigged ship was driven ashore east of Dunkirk, Nord, France. She was on a voyage from Calcutta, India to Dunkirk. She was refloated.
Conatio	United Kingdom	The steamship ran aground at Hartlepool, County Durham. She was on a voyage from Schiedam, South Holland, Netherlands to Hartlepool.
Darlington	United Kingdom	The brig was run into by the steamship Fairy (United Kingdom) and sank in the North Sea south of Clee Ness, Lincolnshire with the loss of her captain. Survivors were rescued byFairy.
Elsina	Netherlands	The galiot was driven ashore on Texel, North Holland. Her crew were rescued. She was on a voyage from Fredrikstad, Denmark to Louvain, Flemish Brabant, Belgium.
Isabel	United Kingdom	The ship ran aground at San Juan, near Seville, Spain. She was on a voyage from Seville to Belfast, County Antrim.
Karnak	United Kingdom	The ship departed from Philadelphia, Pennsylvania, United States for Leith, Lothian. No further trace, reported missing.
Peter Bahlrus	Germany	The ship departed from Grangemouth, Stirlingshire, United Kingdom for Stettin. No further trace, reported missing.
St. Guillaume	Dahomey	The ship departed from Dahome for Cardiff, Glamorgan, United Kingdom. No further trace, presumed foundered with the loss of all hands.
Swiftberg	Norway	The brig was driven ashore and wrecked at Safi, Morocco. Her crew survived.
934	France	The lugger collided with the schooner Englishman (United Kingdom) and foundered off the Kentish Knock.

== 29 November ==
List of shipwrecks: 29 November 1876
Ship	State	Description
Eustace	United Kingdom	The ship foundered in the North Sea 60 nautical miles (110 km) north by east of Goeree, Zeeland, Netherlands. She was on a voyage from Sunderland, County Durham to Dordrecht, South Holland, Netherlands.
Mystère	France	The ship departed from Bordeaux, Gironde for Swansea, Glamorgan, United Kingdom. No further trace, reported missing.
Prussian	United Kingdom	The steamship was damaged by an explosion in her cargo of coal at Liverpool, Lancashire. Fourteen people were severely injured.
Urdal	Norway	The brig was wrecked. She was on a voyage from Minatitlán, Mexico to a European port.

== 30 November ==
List of shipwrecks: 30 November 1876
Ship	State	Description
Atton	United Kingdom	The brigantine ran aground on The Shingles, off the Isle of Wight. She was refloated. and taken in to West Cowes, Isle of Wight in a leaky condition.
Cosmopolite	Netherlands	The brig was abandoned in the North Sea. Her crew were rescued by the brig Carl (Norway). Cosmopolite was on a voyage from Pärnu, Russia to Hull, Yorkshire.
Emma	United Kingdom	The fishing vessel sank at Eastbourne, Sussex. The sole crewman on board was rescued.
Mary	United States	The paddle steamer ran aground and was wrecked at Aransas Pass, Texas. All on board were rescued.
Modesa L. Jarauld	United States	The fishing schooner sailed from Eastport, Maine for the LaHave Banks and vanished. Lost with all eleven crew.
Resolution	United Kingdom	The schooner departed from A Coruña, Spain for Plymouth, Devon. No further trace, reported missing.
Virago	United Kingdom	The steamship ran aground and sank on the Bredgrund, off Falsterbo, Sweden. She was on a voyage from Riga, Russia to Hull, Yorkshire. Virago was refloated in mid-December and was towed in to Copenhagen, Denmark for repairs.

== Unknown date ==
List of shipwrecks: Unknown date in November 1876
Ship	State	Description
Alba C	Italy	The barque was driven ashore at Ballytrent, County Wexford, United Kingdom. She was on a voyage from Tripoli, Ottoman Tripolitania to Liverpool, Lancashire, United Kingdom. She was refloated on 1 December and completed her voyage.
Anthracite	United Kingdom	The brig was driven ashore at Port-la-Nouvelle, Aude, France. She was on a voyage from London to Cette, Hérault, France.
Atlas	United Kingdom	The ship was abandoned in the Atlantic Ocean. Her crew were rescued. She was on a voyage from New York, United States to Queenstown, County Cork.
Chalco	United Kingdom	The barque was abandoned at sea.
Chanticleer	United Kingdom	The ship was wrecked at Cape Aras, near Cézembre, Ille-et-Vilaine, France with the loss of a crew member. She was on a voyage from Vyborg, Grand Duchy of Finland to Cette, Hérault, France.
Clara	Germany	The barque was abandoned in the Atlantic Ocean before 22 November.
Concorde	France	The ship was driven ashore. She was on a voyage from Fredrikstad, Denmark to Saint-Malo, Ille-et-Vilaine. She was refloated and towed in to Dover, Kent, United Kingdom in a waterlogged condition.
Dafila	United Kingdom	The steamship was holed by the propeller of the steamship Gresham (United Kingdom) sank at Kronstadt, Russia. She was on a voyage from Sunderland, County Durham to Kronstadt. She was refloated and temporary repairs were made.
De Salaberry	United Kingdom	The ship was driven ashore at Quebec City, Canada. She was on a voyage from Quebec City to London. She was refloated and taken in to Quebec City in a waterlogged condition.
Donegal	United Kingdom	The ship foundered in the Irish Sea off the coast of County Waterford.
Elise	France	The ship was wrecked on the Boeuf Rocks, on the coast of Morbihan between 11 and 15 November with the loss of all hands. She was on a voyage from the Loire to an English port.
Elizabeth	United States	The brigantine was wrecked in Porter's Passage before 9 November. Her crew were rescued.
Favourite	United Kingdom	The schooner foundered in the Atlantic Ocean. Her crew were rescued by the lugger Lord Clarence Paget (United Kingdom).
Flying Star	United Kingdom	The ship collided with New Enterprise (United Kingdom) and sank in the North Sea off the coast of Northumberland. Her crew were rescued.
Follina	Germany	The schooner struck a sunken wreck in the North Sea and foundered. Her crew were rescued by the smack Branch (United Kingdom). Follina was on a voyage from Brake to Middlesbrough, Yorkshire, United Kingdom.
Hardwick	United Kingdom	The steamship ran aground in the Danube at Gorgova, Ottoman Empire. She was refloated.
Hero of the Nile	Victoria	The barque was wrecked at Fremantle, Western Australia before 10 March.
Isaac Oliver	United States	The derelict schooner was discovered in the Atlantic Ocean by the steamship Etna (United Kingdom), which put a crew on board.
James Wall	United States	The brigantine was abandoned in the Atlantic Ocean before 26 November.
John S. Tyler	United States	The fishing schooner sailed from Gloucester, Massachusetts on 11 November and vanished. Lost with all ten crew.
Lord Nelson	United Kingdom	The smack foundered in the North Sea.
Magdalena	Norway	The ship was sighted in the Øresund in early November whilst on a voyage from Skutskär, Sweden to Greenock, Renfrewship, United Kingdom. No further trace, reported missing.
Magnolia	United Kingdom	The ship was wrecked before 4 November. She was on a voyage from Montreal, Quebec, Canada to London.
Maria	United Kingdom	The ship became waterlogged in the Atlantic Ocean. She was on a voyage from Doboy, Georgia, United States to Dublin. Only two of her fourteen crew were alive when rescued on 9 January 1877 by F. E. Macdonald (United States), but one of them died that day.
Milo	United Kingdom	The ship was abandoned at sea after 12 November. Her crew were rescued. She was on a voyage from Amoy to Shanghai, China.
Minerva	United Kingdom	The barque was driven ashore at Main-à-Dieu, Nova Scotia, Canada. She was on a voyage from London to Charlottetown, Prince Edward Island, Canada.
Minnie	United Kingdom	The ship sank at "Faraman". She was on a voyage from Sierra Leone to Marseille, Bouches-du-Rhône, France.
Moses Williamson	United States	The barque was destroyed by fire at Marseille.
Porthaw	(Russian Empire) Grand Duchy of Finland	The ship was abandoned in the Baltic Sea. Her crew were rescued by Rikstina von Loh (Flag unknown).
Progress	United Kingdom	The dredger sank at Porth Neigwl, Caernarfonshire. She was refloated on 30 March 1877 and beached. Subsequently taken in to Pwllheli for repairs.
Reine da Monde	France	The ship was driven ashore at Avila, Florida, United States She was on a voyage from San Francisco, California, United States to Falmouth, Cornwall, United Kingdom. She was refloated with assistance.
Reward	United Kingdom	The schooner was wrecked on a reef 3 nautical miles (5.6 km) south west of Tiree, Outer Hebrides with the loss of two of her five crew.
Sandsend	United Kingdom	The steamship was driven ashore 5 nautical miles (9.3 km) from Lyserort, Courland Governorate. She was on a voyage from Pärnu, Russia to Rotterdam, South Holland, Netherlands. She was refloated and resumed her voyage.
Seift	Norway	The brig was driven ashore at Safi, Morocco.
Sif	(Russian Empire) Grand Duchy of Finland	The schooner was driven ashore on Osmussaar, Russia with the loss of a crew member. She was on a voyage from Newcastle upon Tyne to Helsinki.
St. Peter	Canada	The ship was driven ashore and wrecked at the mouth of the Gindura River, 5 nautical miles (9.3 km) from Galle, Ceylon. She was on a voyage from Cardiff, Glamorgan, United Kingdom to Galle.
Vestalinden	Norway	The brig foundered. Her crew were rescued by Maria Catharine (United Kingdom). Vestalinden was on a voyage from Exeter, Devon, United Kingdom to Grimstad.
W. W. Lord	Canada	The ship was wrecked at Sydney, Nova Scotia. She was on a voyage from "Wycacomaugh" to Leith, Lothian, United Kingdom.
Wyoming	United States	The fishing schooner sailed from Gloucester, Massachusetts on 15 November and vanished. Lost with all nine crew.
