= Hallberg-Rassy 40 =

Centre-cockpit blue water keelboat

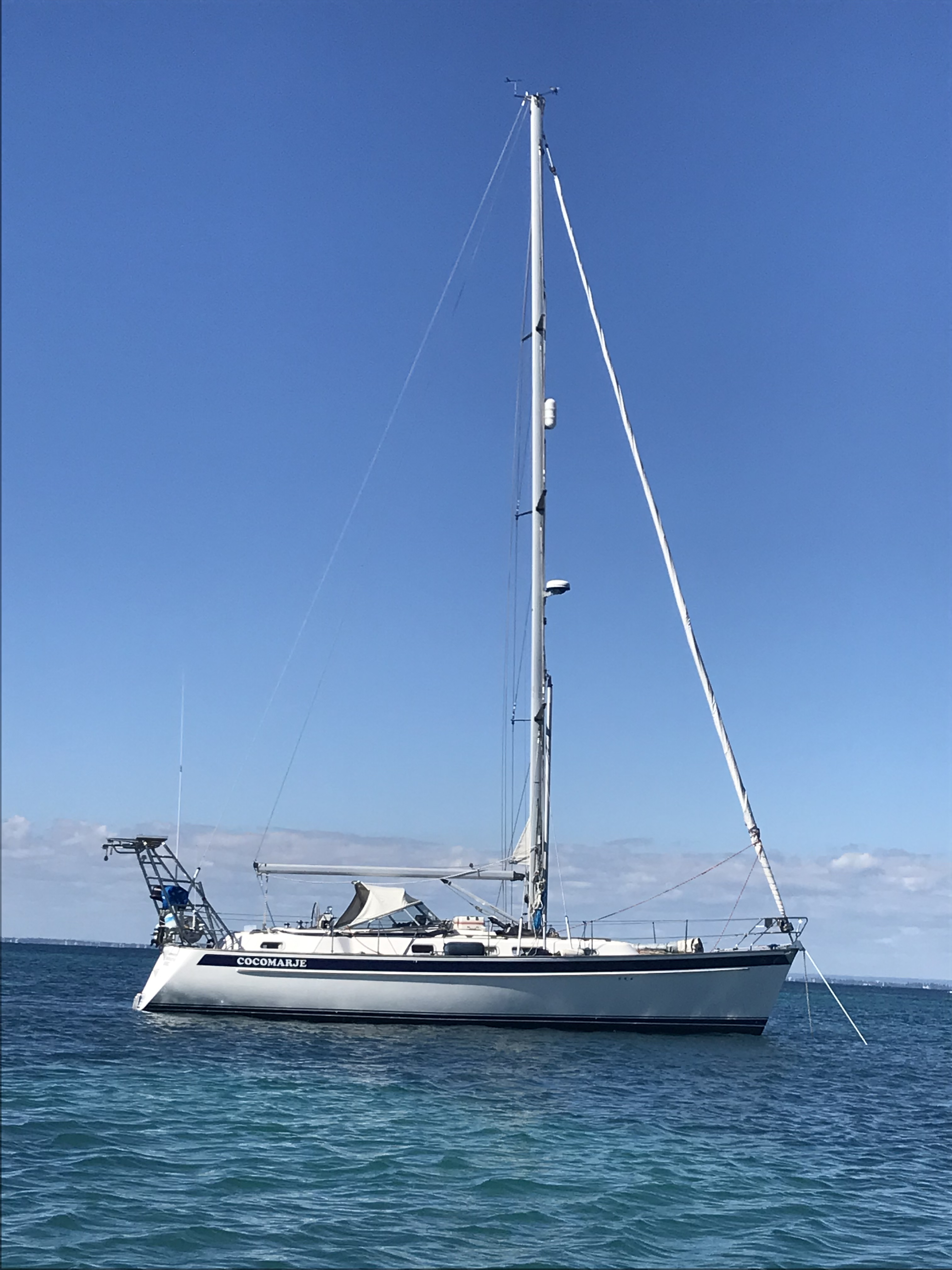
- A Hallberg-Rassy 40 yacht anchored

Development
- Designer: Germán Frers
- Location: Sweden
- Year: 2002
- Builder: Hallberg-Rassy
- Name: Hallberg-Rassy 40

Boat
- Displacement: 22,100 lb (10,024 kg)
- Draft: 6.53 ft (1.99 m)

Hull
- Type: Monohull
- Construction: Fiberglass
- LOA: 40.68 ft (12.40 m)
- LWL: 36.23 ft (11.04 m)
- Beam: 12.52 ft (3.82 m)
- Engine: Inboard motor

Hull appendages
- Keel: fin keel
- Rudder: internally-mounted partial skeg rudder

Rig
- Rig type: Bermuda rig

Sails
- Sailplan: Masthead sloop
- Total sail area: 869 sq ft (80.7 m^{2})

The Hallberg-Rassy 40 is a Swedish sailboat, that was designed by Germán Frers and first built in 2002. The yacht is a high quality blue water cruiser capable of extended ocean passages.

The design is built by Hallberg-Rassy in Sweden and the Mark II version ceased production in 2018.

== Design ==
The Hallberg-Rassy 40 is a recreational centre-cockpit keelboat, built predominantly of fiberglass, with wood trim. It has a masthead sloop rig, an internally-mounted spade-type rudder on a partial skeg controlled by a wheel and a fixed fin keel with lead ballast. It displaces 22,100 lb (10,024 kg).

The boat has a draft of 6.53 ft (1.99 m) with the standard keel fitted and mounts an inboard diesel engine.

== Awards ==
The Hallberg-Rassy 40 has won the following awards:

- Cruising World’s Boat of the Year in the Cruising Category in 2004.
- 2004 European Yacht of the Year in the 12-15m category.
- 2004 Best Liveaboard Cruising Boat.
- Sailboat of the Show in Stockholm.
