= Svanvik =

- Location within Västra Götaland Location within Sweden
- Coordinates: 58°07′N 11°41′E
- Country: Sweden
- Province: Bohuslän
- County: Västra Götaland County
- Municipality: Orust Municipality

Area
  - Total: 0.35 km^{2} (0.14 sq mi)

Population (31 December 2010)
  - Total: 293
  - Density: 840/km^{2} (2,200/sq mi)
- Time zone: UTC+1 (CET)
  - Summer (DST): UTC+2 (CEST)

Svanvik is a locality situated in Orust Municipality, Västra Götaland County, Sweden. Its population in 2010 was 293. It is situated on Sweden's fourth largest island, Orust.

== Notable Places ==
Notable places around Svanvik include Skåpesundsbron 3 km (1.9 mi) south of Svanvik, and Stala Church 3 km (1.9 mi) northwest of Svanvik.
