= Hallberg-Rassy Monsun 31 =

Swedish sailboat

Development
- Designer: Olle Enderlein
- Location: Sweden
- Year: 1974 - 1982
- No. built: 904
- Brand: Hallberg-Rassy
- Builder: Hallberg-Rassy
- Role: daysailing / cruising
- Name: Hallberg-Rassy Monsun 31

Boat
- Displacement: 9,250 lb (4,200 kg)
- Draft: 4.58 ft (1.40 m)

Hull
- Type: Monohull
- Construction: Fiberglass
- LOA: 30.75 ft (9.37 m)
- LWL: 24.67 ft (7.52 m)
- Beam: 9.42 ft (2.87 m)
- Engine: Volvo Penta MD11 C, 23 hp (17 kW) diesel engine

Hull appendages
- Keel: Full keel
- Ballast: 4,200 lb (1,900 kg)
- Rudder: Keel hung

Rig
- Rig type: Bermuda rig

Sails
- Sailplan: Masthead sloop
- Mainsail area: 19 m^{2} (205 ft^{2})
- Jib/genoa area: 12 m^{2} (129 ft^{2}) to 31 m^{2} (334 ft^{2})
- Spinnaker area: 71 m^{2} (764 ft^{2})
- Total sail area: 39 m^{2} (420 ft^{2})

The Hallberg-Rassy Monsun 31 is a Swedish sailboat designed by Olle Enderlein in GRP and built between 1974 and 1982. The yacht is known for its traditional long keel, high build quality and sleek lines as a blue water cruiser. It is the best selling Hallberg-Rassy sailing boat to date with 904 hulls built.

== Design ==
The Monsun is a Bermudan rigged masthead sloop with an aft cockpit and a mahogany interior. The design was based on Hallberg-Rassy's larger sister model, Rasmus 35, and was one of the first models to use Hallberg-Rassy's signature windscreen, which was innovative at the time. It has an encapsulated fuel tank inside the keel under the engine and was delivered with a 23 hp inboard diesel engine.

== Famous voyages ==
Kurt Björklund did three and a half circumnavigations of the planet on his Monsun, 'Golden Lady', before retiring it in the Råå museum in Scania, Sweden.
