= Varekilsnäs =

Coordinates: 58°06′N 11°42′E

Varekilsnäs is a community located on the island of Orust in Bohuslän, on the Swedish west coast. It is the first village you meet when you enter Orust on road 160 from Tjörn.

Varekilsnäs has records from 14th century, but is today more known for its scenic location and beautiful views over the archipelago. Deciduous forests including oak are located south of Varekilsnäs. Local rock formations are known as excellent examples of augen gneiss.
