= Hälleviksstrand =

- Location within Västra Götaland Location within Sweden
- Coordinates: 58°08′N 11°27′E
- Country: Sweden
- Province: Bohuslän
- County: Västra Götaland County
- Municipality: Orust Municipality

Area
  - Total: 0.36 km^{2} (0.14 sq mi)

Population (31 December 2010)
  - Total: 214
  - Density: 601/km^{2} (1,560/sq mi)
- Time zone: UTC+1 (CET)
  - Summer (DST): UTC+2 (CEST)

Hälleviksstrand is a locality situated in Orust Municipality, Västra Götaland County, Sweden with 214 inhabitants in 2010.

Hälleviksstrand is often locally called Strana and is a fishing town. 2015 Hälleviksstrand had a population of less than 200 inhabitants.

== History ==
It is unknown when Halleviksstrand was founded; the first written sources about it date back to 1617. Fishermen set up camps along the coast and began constructing lodgings there. During the 1700s and the herring period, many farmers from the hinterland of Orust began moving to the coast and to Halleviksstrand to fish for herring. By the end of the 1800s, the town had grown, with the addition of a new hot bathhouse and a boarding house. Soon, a mountain was also built behind the coast. In the early 1900s, a shipyard was constructed, and Hälleviksstrand flourished.
