= Svanesund =

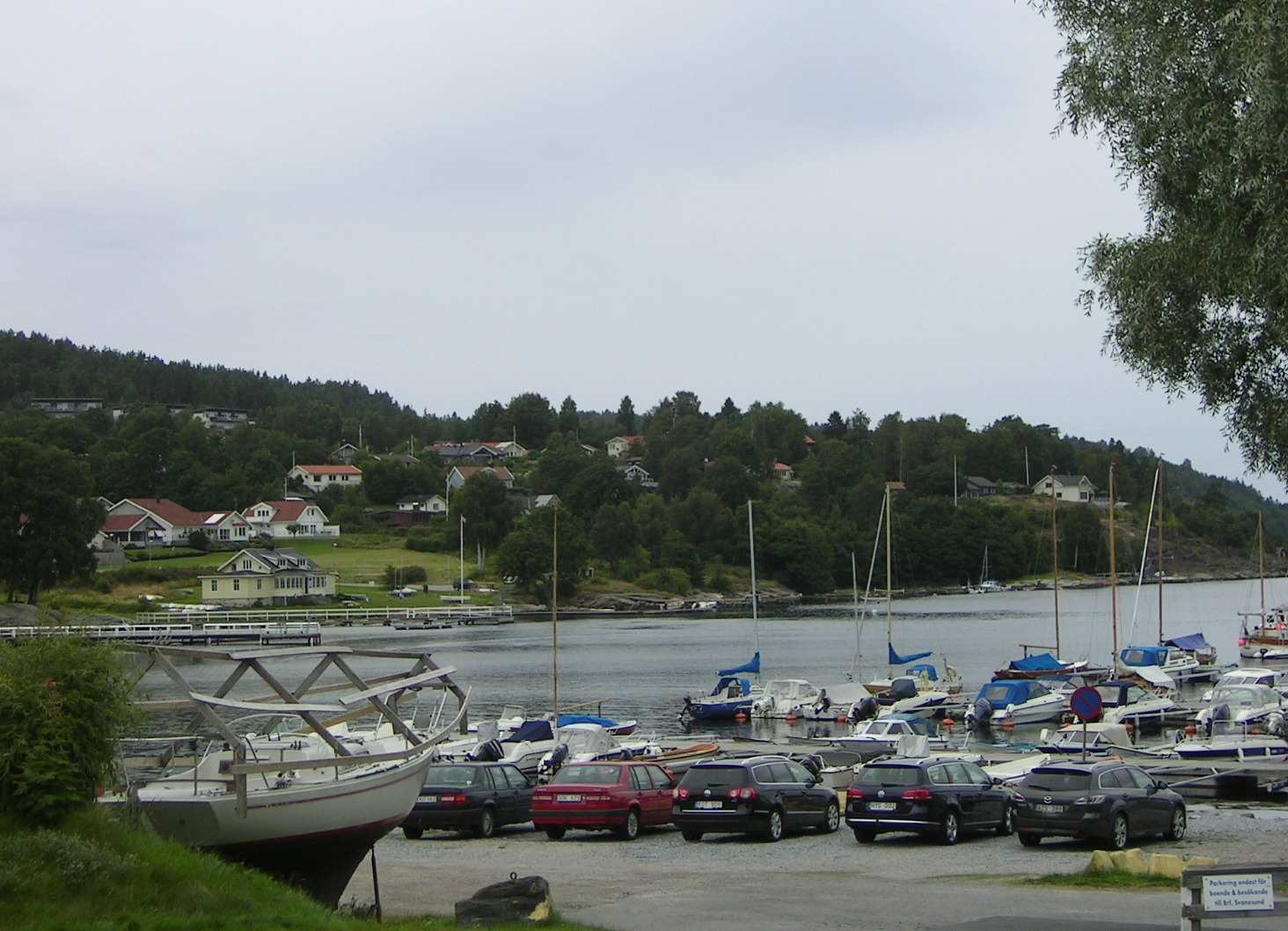
- Harbor in Svanesund

- Location within Västra Götaland Location within Sweden
- Coordinates: 58°08′N 11°50′E
- Country: Sweden
- Province: Bohuslän
- County: Västra Götaland County
- Municipality: Orust Municipality

Area
  - Total: 1.54 km^{2} (0.59 sq mi)

Population (31 December 2010)
  - Total: 1,518
  - Density: 983/km^{2} (2,550/sq mi)
- Time zone: UTC+1 (CET)
  - Summer (DST): UTC+2 (CEST)

Svanesund is a locality situated in Orust Municipality, Västra Götaland County, Sweden and is located on the channel between the east side of the island and Bohusläns mainland. The population last known as of 2010 was 1,518. The agglomeration is the second largest on Orust after Henan and extends a few kilometers inland from the ferry.

== Notable figures ==
• Quentin Rydell Hjortander
