= Mollösund =

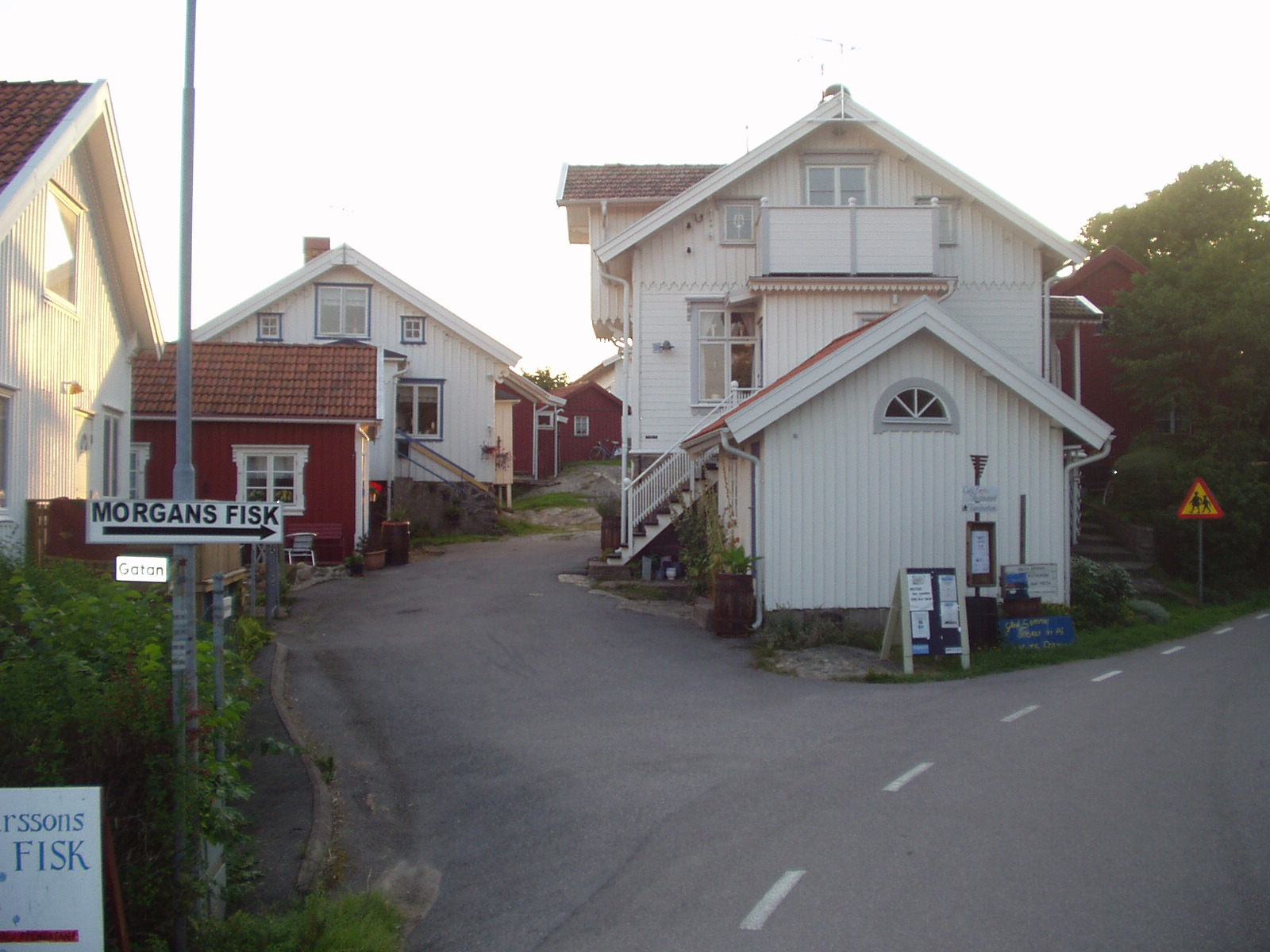

- Location within Västra Götaland Location within Sweden
- Coordinates: 58°04′N 11°28′E
- Country: Sweden
- Province: Bohuslän
- County: Västra Götaland County
- Municipality: Orust Municipality

Area
  - Total: 0.36 km^{2} (0.14 sq mi)

Population (31 December 2010)
  - Total: 236
  - Density: 664/km^{2} (1,720/sq mi)
- Time zone: UTC+1 (CET)
  - Summer (DST): UTC+2 (CEST)

Mollösund is an old fishing village and a locality situated in Orust Municipality, Västra Götaland County, Sweden with 236 inhabitants in 2010. It is located on the southwest tip of Orust Municipality in the outer archipelago of Sweden’s west coast.

Records of permanent settlements date back to the early 16th century. The traditionally predominant catches were herring and the common ling, used mostly to prepare the dish lutefisk. During the latter part of the 19th century, approximately 30 sailing ships berthed in Mollösund transported raw materials to and from the region, including coal, iron, and salt.

Commercial fishing from Mollösund has all but shut down in recent years, but preparation of lutefisk with imported products still occurs on a small scale.

The area is home to approximately 277 year-round residents and is a popular tourist destination during the summer months.
