= Varekil =

- Location within Västra Götaland Location within Sweden
- Coordinates: 58°08′N 11°42′E
- Country: Sweden
- Province: Bohuslän
- County: Västra Götaland County
- Municipality: Orust Municipality

Area
  - Total: 0.66 km^{2} (0.25 sq mi)

Population (31 December 2010)
  - Total: 602
  - Density: 912/km^{2} (2,360/sq mi)
- Time zone: UTC+1 (CET)
  - Summer (DST): UTC+2 (CEST)

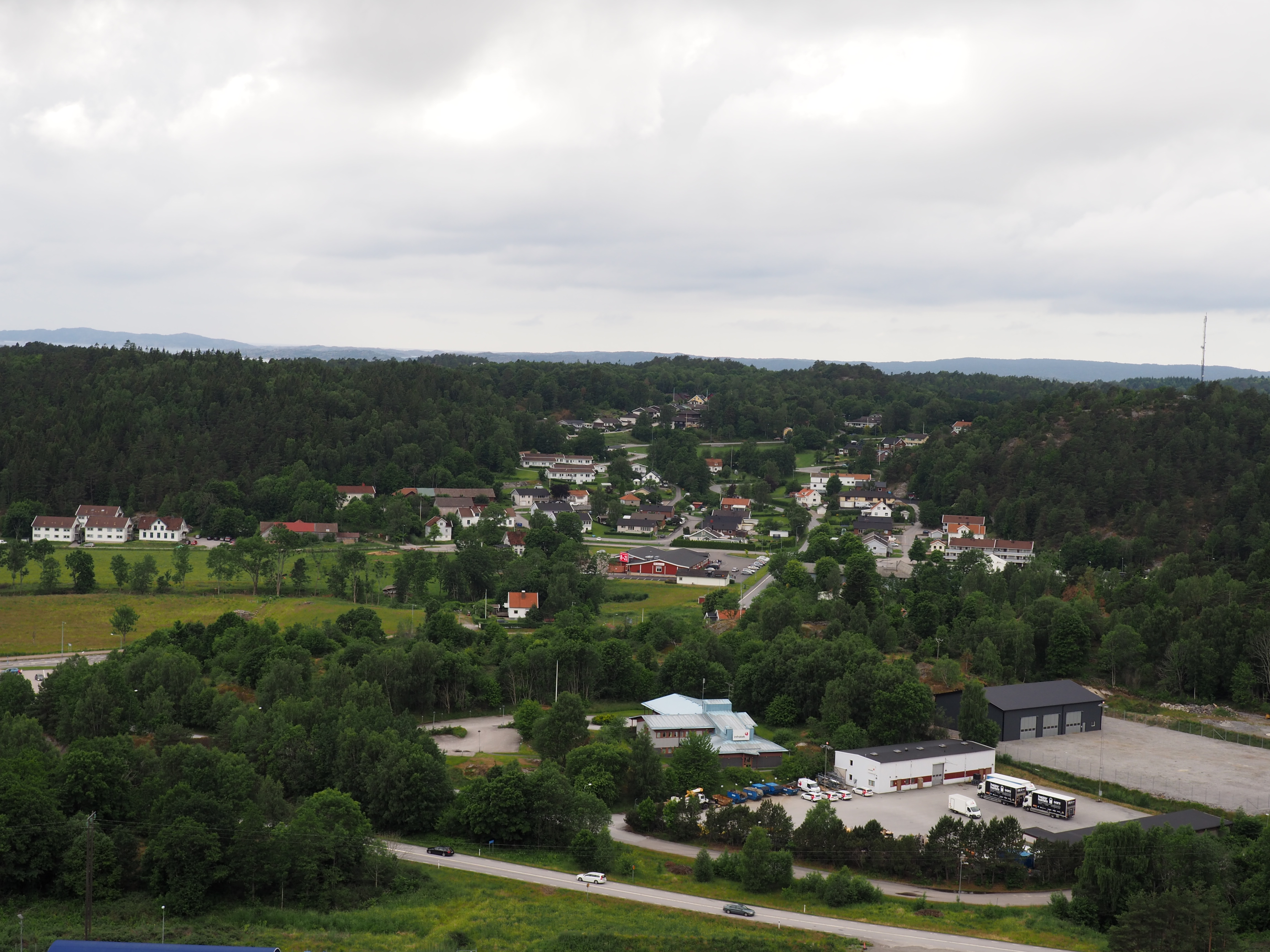

Varekil is a locality situated in Orust Municipality, Västra Götaland County, Sweden with 602 inhabitants in 2010.
