= Ellös =

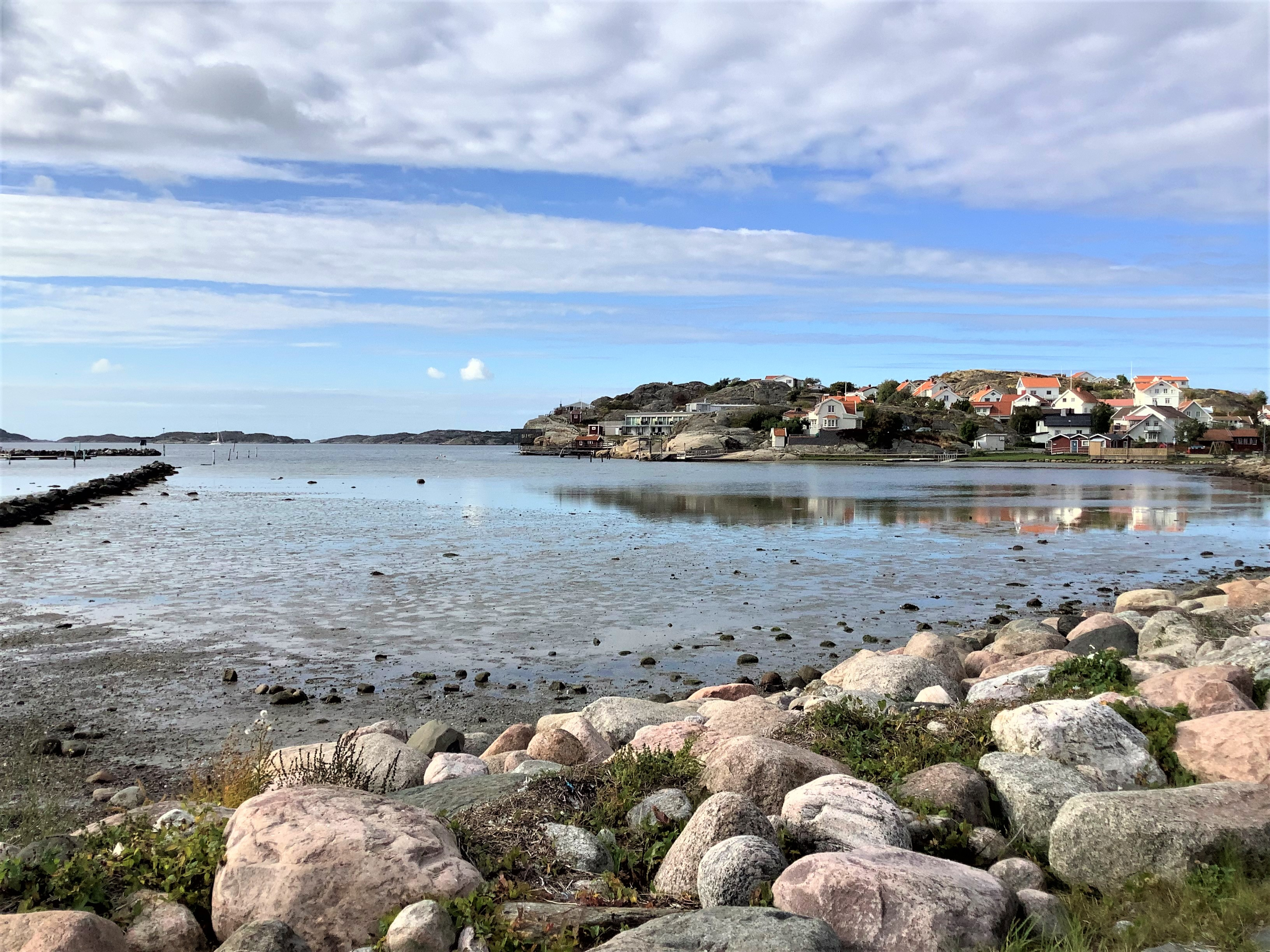
- Skeppsviken in Ellös

- Location within Västra Götaland Location within Sweden
- Coordinates: 58°11′N 11°28′E
- Country: Sweden
- Province: Bohuslän
- County: Västra Götaland County
- Municipality: Orust Municipality

Area
  - Total: 1.21 km^{2} (0.47 sq mi)

Population (31 December 2010)
  - Total: 998
  - Density: 826/km^{2} (2,140/sq mi)
- Time zone: UTC+1 (CET)
  - Summer (DST): UTC+2 (CEST)

Ellös (Swedish pronunciation: [ˈɛ̂lːøːs]) is a locality situated in Orust Municipality, Västra Götaland County, Sweden. The locality had 998 inhabitants in 2010.
