= Henån =

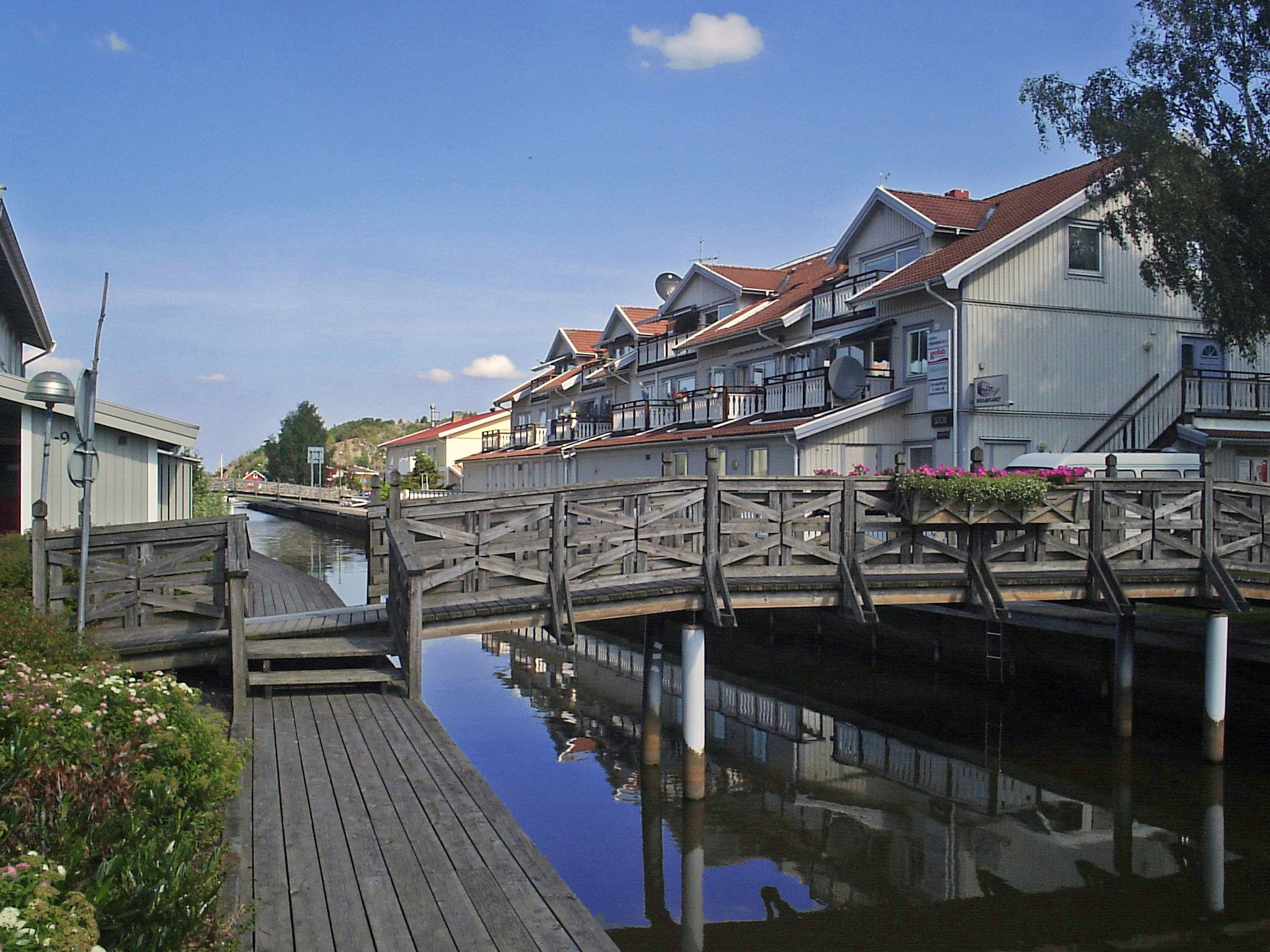
- Henån in August 2006

- Location within Västra Götaland Location within Sweden
- Coordinates: 58°14′N 11°41′E
- Country: Sweden
- Province: Bohuslän
- County: Västra Götaland County
- Municipality: Orust Municipality

Area
  - Total: 1.98 km^{2} (0.76 sq mi)

Population (31 December 2010)
  - Total: 1,816
  - Density: 919/km^{2} (2,380/sq mi)
- Time zone: UTC+1 (CET)
  - Summer (DST): UTC+2 (CEST)

Henån is a locality and the seat of Orust Municipality, Västra Götaland County, Sweden with 1,816 inhabitants in 2010.

== Overview ==
Henån is home to approximately 2,000 permanent year-round residents with a significant increase of summer residents who come from the nearby towns and cities to stay in their summer cottages, which frequently are passed down for generations.

In 1850, Henån became one of the first swimming resorts in Sweden where people from Gothenburg, Alingsås, and other inland cities and towns came to stay with locals to enjoy the warm summer waters of the sea. Later the hotel and hostels were built and saw the town of Henån grow.

There is a boat-building tradition on Henån which still lives on amongst the residents. While most of the smaller traditional boat building shops have since long closed down, the traditional craft has turned out brands like Najad, Hallberg-Rassy, Malö Yachts, and Regina af Vindö.
