= Robert Smythier =

English silversmith

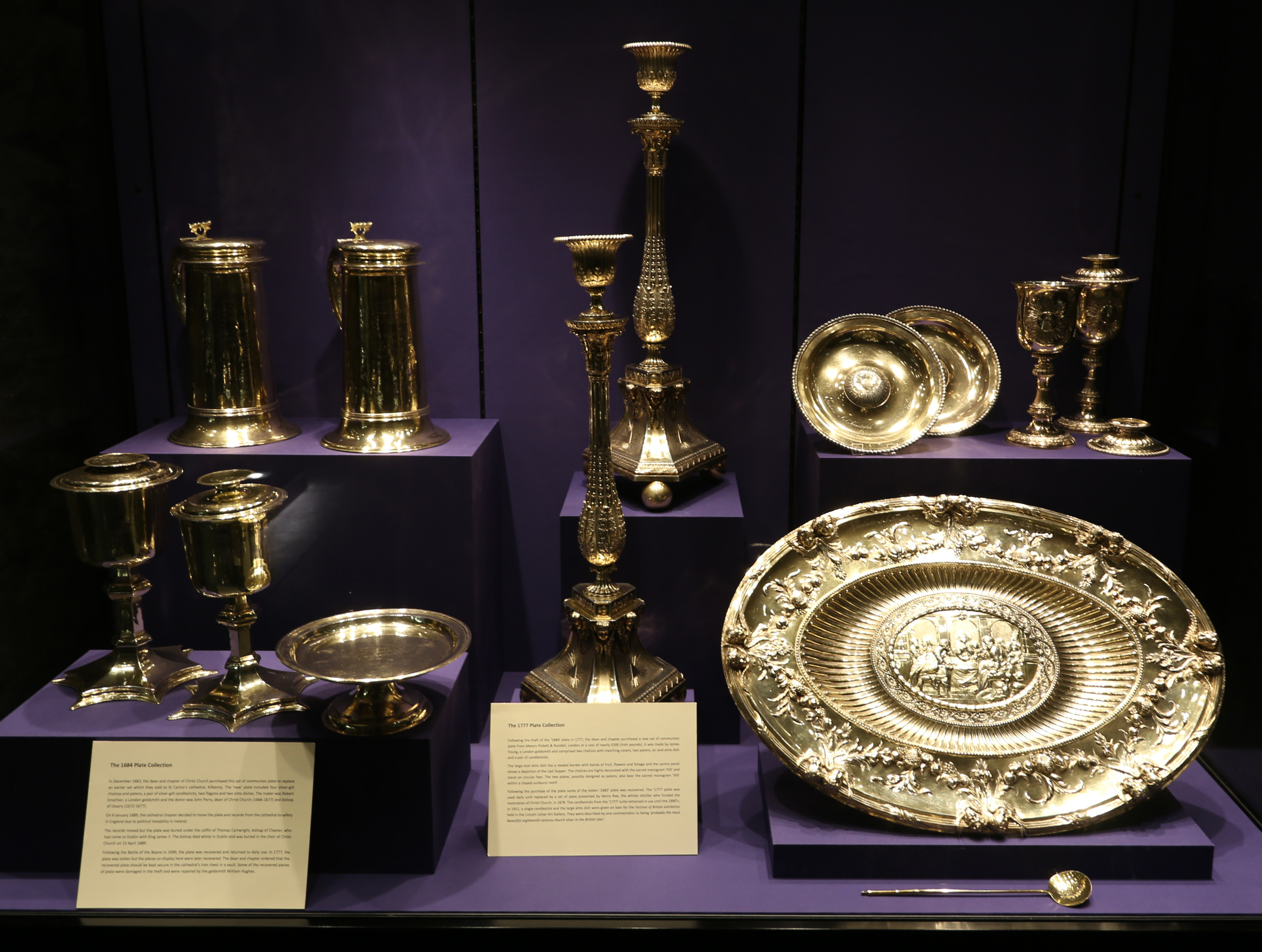
Silveware by Smythier in the crypt of Christ Church Cathedral, Dublin.

Robert Smythier was an English silversmith, active in the second half of the 17th century. He designed vessels like cruets and flagons, as well as inkstands, scones, and toilet services. His work is in the Royal Collection and the Victoria and Albert Museum in the UK, and the Metropolitan Museum of Art in the U.S.. It can also be found in the crypt of Christ Church Cathedral, Dublin in Ireland.
