= Joseph Coteau =

Joseph Coteau (also Jean-Joseph Coteau and Jean Coteau; 1740–1801) was a French enamellist.

Since the description by Henri Clouzot, he has been said to be born in Geneva, but has been found to be unknown there in civil status archives, but he might have been apprentice there or have been born nearby. With his spouse, Elisabeth Chapman, he had a daughter, Elisabeth. On 5 August 1809, she married Jean Maurice Barrai, a watchmaker born in Geneva.

In 1766 he was accepted as a member of the Académie de Saint-Luc in Paris. In 1782, he is described as an "enamel painter" in Paris, rue Poupée, parish of Saint-André-des-Arts.

For the Manufacture de Sèvres he worked on a soft-paste porcelain toilet service that was offered by Louis XVI and Marie Antoinette to Sophie Dorothea of Württemberg when she visited Paris in 1782 as the comtesse du Nord. Charles Claude Flahaut, Count of Angiviller, who was administrating the Manufacture de Sèvres from 1774 to 1791, and a person called Vergennes had agreed on the creation of the toilet service in January 1781.

He also worked for the Comte d'Artois Factory. His works include decorations for clocks.

== Selected works ==
- gold cased, double-dialled, cylinder watch with equation of time and calendar indications, ca. 1770, London, British Museum, inv. no. 1958,1201.176
- Louis XVI ormolu astronomical vase clock "pendule a cercles tournants", 1778, Vienna, private collection
- soft-paste porcelain toilet service offered to Sophie Dorothea of Württemberg, Manufacture de Sèvres
- pair of dark blue-ground vases, signed and dated 1783, Paris, Musée du Louvre, OA.7738–7739
- regulator clock showing mean and solar time, 1784, New York, Frick Collection, inv. no. 1999.5.151
- mantel clock, ca. 1790, Royal Collection, inv. no. RCIN 2742
- regulator clock showing mean and solar time, 1792, New York, Frick Collection, inv. no. 1999.5.150
- timepiece, 1793–1794, London, Khalili Collections, inv. no. 503
- skeleton clock, ca. 1795, Rothschild collection
- mantel clock, late 18th century, Royal Collection, inv. no. RCIN 2756

== Literature ==
- Preaud, Tamara (1986). "Sèvres Enamelled Porcelain: Eight Dies (And a Quarrel) Rediscovered". The Burlington Magazine. 128 (999): 391–397. ISSN 0007-6287. JSTOR 882528.
- Plinval de Guillebon, Régine de (1992). "Un phénomène périodique : La mode du décor d'or appliqué et d'émail sur la porcelaine française (XVIIe-XIXe siècles)". Sèvres. Revue de la Société des amis du Musée national de la céramique (in French) (1): 7–22. doi:10.3406/sevre.1992.1281. ISSN 1169-2537.
- Colomban, Philippe; Kırmızı, Burcu; Clais, Jean-Baptiste; Gironda, Michele (December 2020). "An on-site Raman and pXRF study of Joseph Coteau and Philippe Parpette's jewelled porcelain: a summit of ceramic art". Journal of Cultural Heritage. 46: 82–94. doi:10.1016/j.culher.2020.06.008.
