= Glove stretcher =

Victorian era product

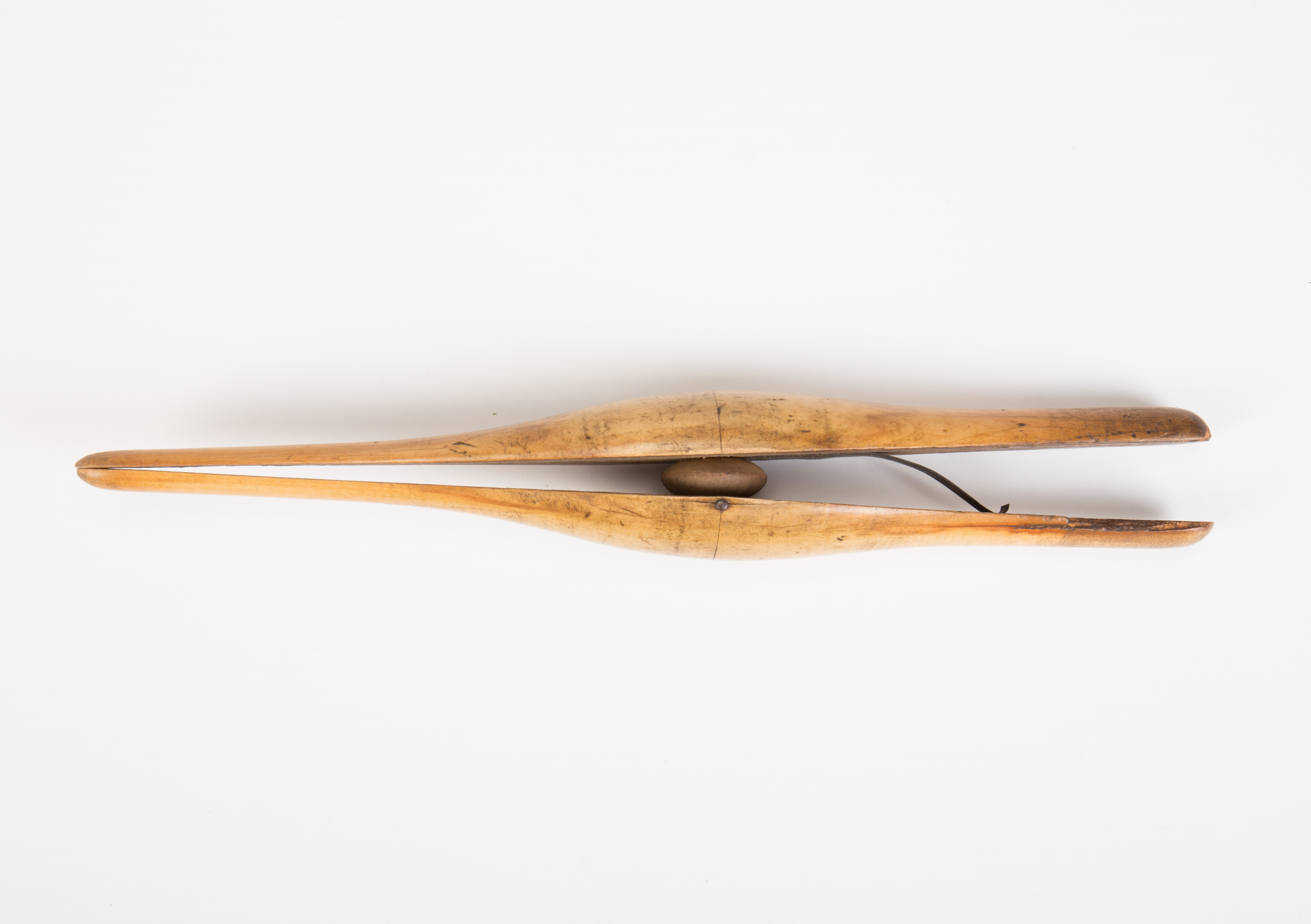
Wooden glove stretcher

Glove stretcher is a 19th century device for "easing" (stretching) the gloves. The rounded tips of the stretchers, typically made of two wooden pieces hinged in the middle and spring-loaded, were placed inside the fingers of a glove. The handles were then squeezed so the fingers were stretched, allowing the glove to be put on without damaging it. The scissors-like implements were also made from metal and celluloid.

== History ==
Glove stretchers were popular in the Victorian era.

Kid leather was considered to be the best material for gloves worn by a proper Victorian lady, as cotton and silk were easily stretchable, thus revealing the imperfections of a hand. The leather of a young goat was essential to emulate the desired appearance of a hand with tapered fingertips. The scissor-like stretchers were helping to preserve the shape of the glove fingers after washing.

A 1908 advice on washing the chamois gloves suggests using the stretcher as an alternative to washing and drying the gloves on hands.

In the 19th century the stretchers were widespread, every "good" shop or household was expected to have one. In the 21st century the original device resembling the scissors is largely forgotten. Haglund reports that while playing a version of the Kim's game, children are no longer able to guess the purpose of the implement.

== Sources ==
- National Coal Mining Museum (2021). "Victorian home" (PDF). www.ncm.org.uk. National Coal Mining Museum for England.
- Beaujot, Ariel (2012), ""The Beauty of Her Hands": The Glove and the Making of Middle-class Womanhood", Victorian Fashion Accessories, Bloomsbury Publishing Plc, pp. 31–62, doi:10.2752/9781472504517/Beaujot0003, ISBN 978-1-4725-0451-7
