= Toilet service =

Objects used at a dressing table

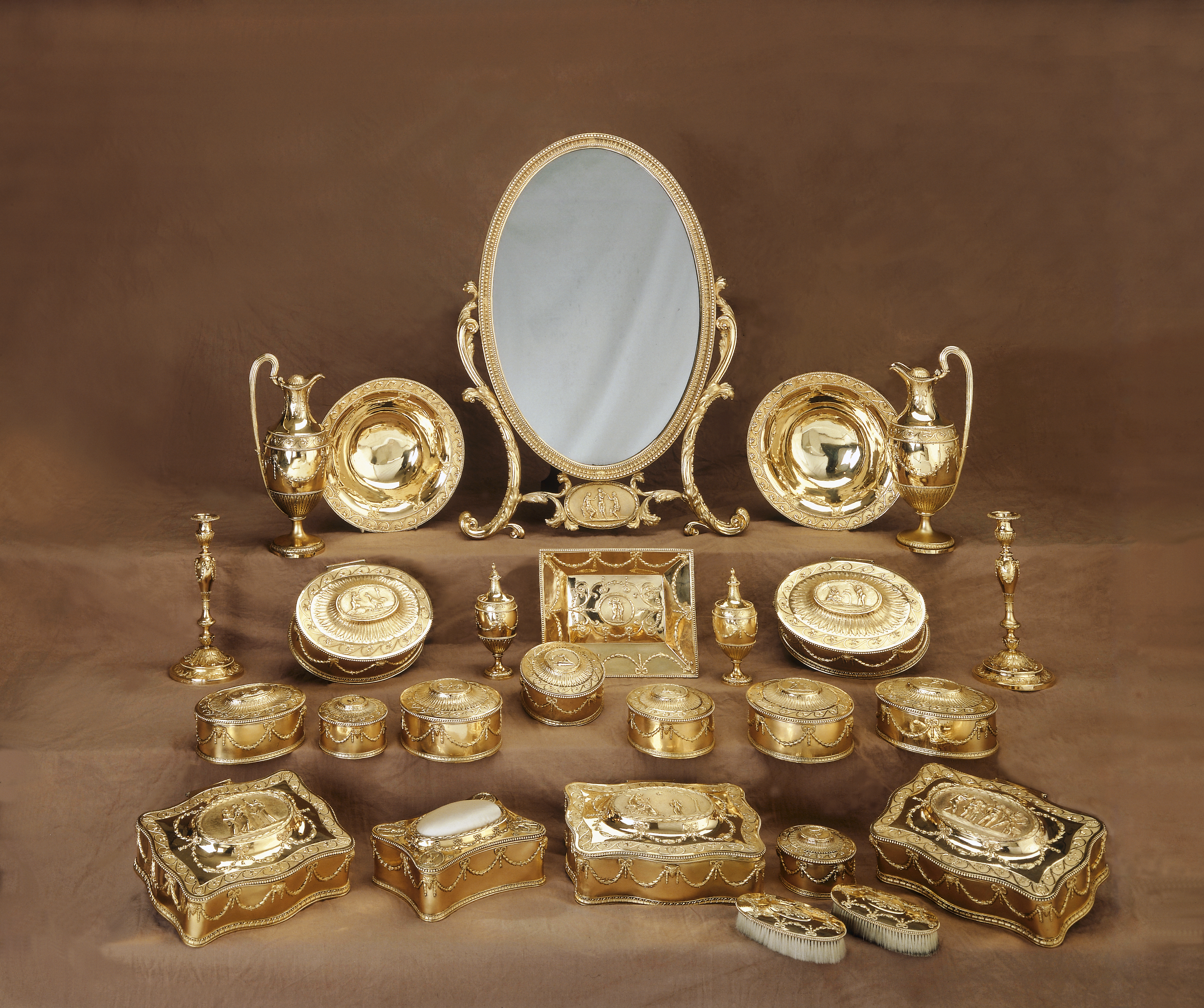
Silver-gilt service made in London in 1777–78 for the Swedish royal family

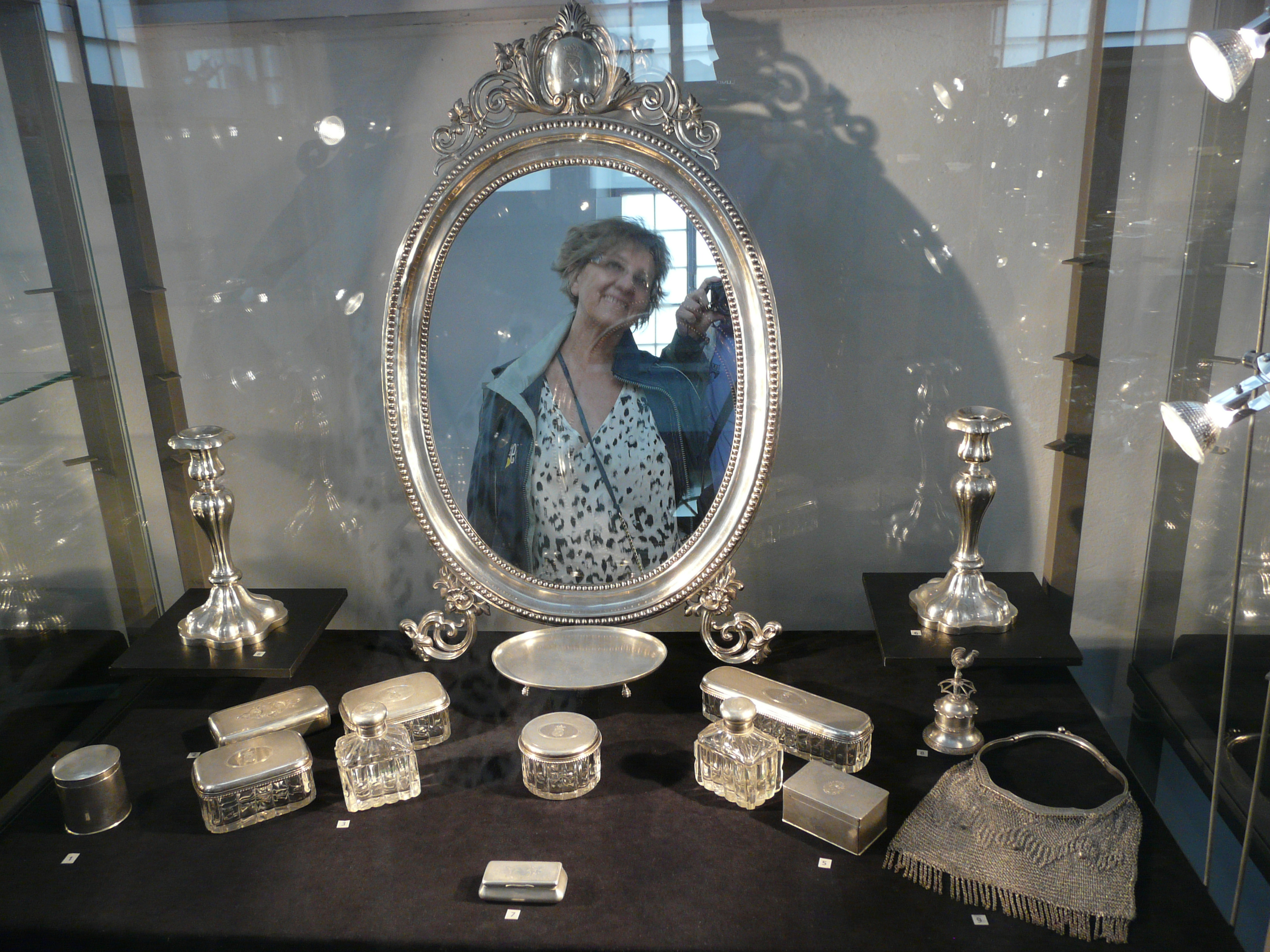
A toilet service in silver

A toilet service is a set of objects for use at the dressing table. The term is usually reserved for large luxury sets from the 17th to 19th centuries, with toilet set or vanity set used for later or simpler sets. Historically, services were made in metal, ceramics, and other materials, for both men and women, though male versions were generally much smaller. The rich had services in gold, silver, or silver-gilt. The contents vary, but typically include a mirror, one or more small ewers and basins, two candlesticks, and an assortment of bowls, boxes, caskets, and other containers. One or more brushes and a pin-cushion, often as a top to a box, are often included. The sets usually came with a custom-made travelling case, and some services were especially designed for travelling.

The toilet service was the most important item of "dressing plate", as opposed to table plate, and was often a gift upon marriage; sometimes augmented on the birth of children. It was normally the personal property of the wife. The morning levée was sometimes a semi-public occasion for great persons in the early modern period, and the toilet service might be seen by many people.

The U.S. market for vanity sets had almost entirely disappeared by 1937 due to changes in women's lifestyles and associated simplified hairdos.

== Terminology ==
The word toilet comes from the French toile meaning 'cloth', and toilette ('little cloth') first came to mean the morning routine of washing, tidying hair, and shaving and making up as appropriate, from the cloth often spread on the dressing-table where this was done. This meaning entered the English language as toilet in the 17th century; only later did toilet start to compete with lavatory as a euphemism for the plumbing fixture. The Oxford English Dictionary records toilet in English from 1540, first as a term for a cloth used to wrap clothes, then from 1662 (by John Evelyn) for a gold toilet service, and by 1700 for a range of related meanings (a towel, the cloth on a dressing-table, the act of using a dressing-table, and so on), but not for a lavatory, which did not come into use until the 19th century.

== Contents ==
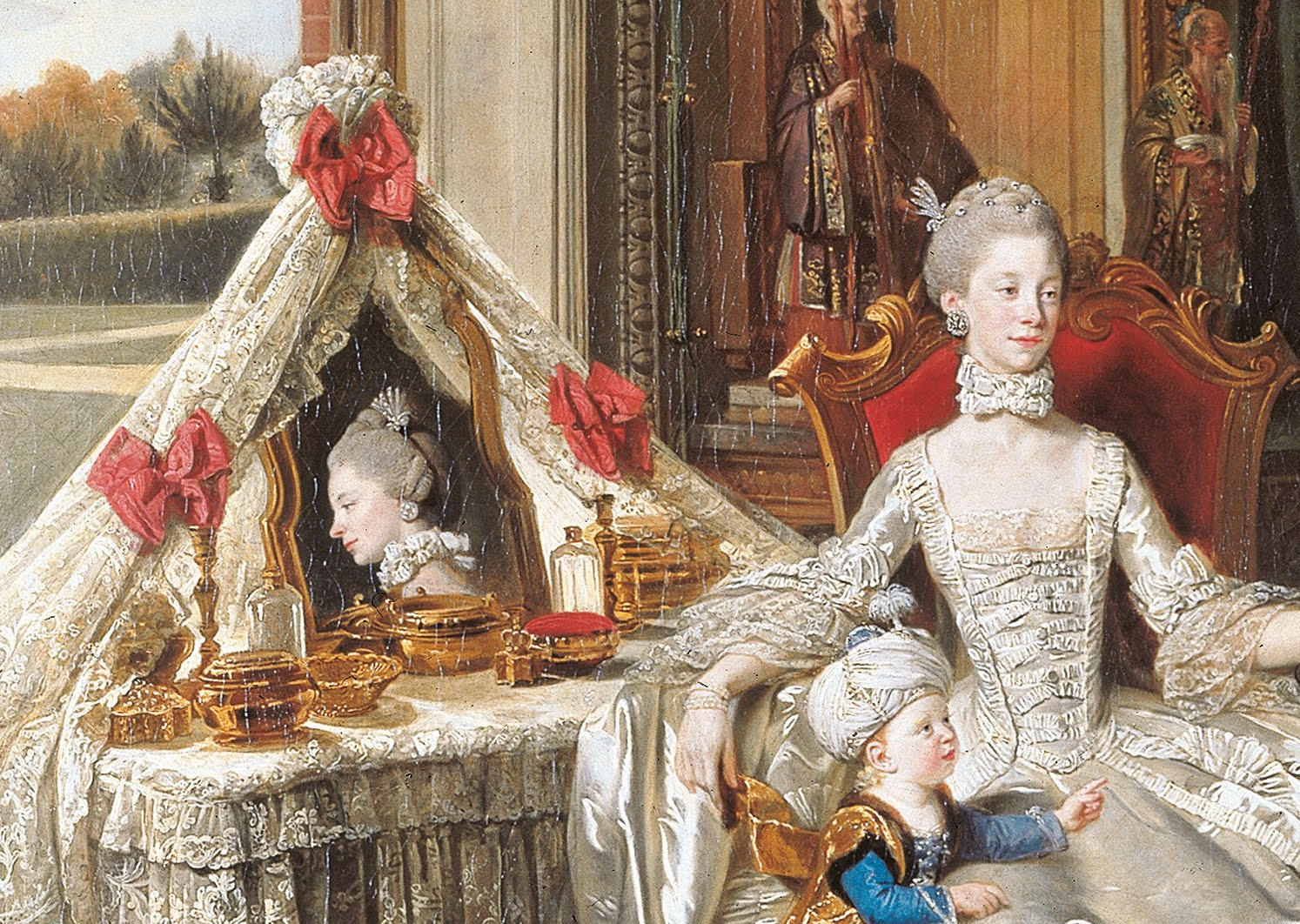
Detail of Queen Charlotte with her Two Eldest Sons, Johan Zoffany, 1765 (the whole painting)

The contents of a service were variable but the classical grouping had as its largest piece the mirror, usually decorated at the top with some form of crest. In the 17th century these were rectangular, usually oblongs in "portrait" format, though the Louvre mirror and the Lennoxlove service use a "landscape" format. The frame normally had a wooden framework holding the glass, over which the metal was fitted. In the 18th century oval mirrors began to be used, and later the introduction of dressing tables with built-in mirrors was part of the decline from fashion of the toilet service. Depictions in art, such as the Zoffany of Queen Charlotte, usually show that the elaborate crest at the top of the mirror has disappeared beneath the lace covers spreading to the sides, which are probably tied round it. These were used to pull over the service on its table when it was not in use, or when husbands or other inconvenient visitors appeared in the dressing room.

The service usually contained two fairly small candlesticks, allowing the face to be lit from below. There may also be "hand-candles", "chamber candles" or "chamber sticks", short, with a wide saucer-like base and a loop or handle. These were the last lights to be put out at night, and were carried in the hand. Candlestick makers (who always used casting) were treated as a speciality within silversmithing, and the candlesticks may be made by different workshops from the other pieces, as may any snuffers, also regarded as a speciality.

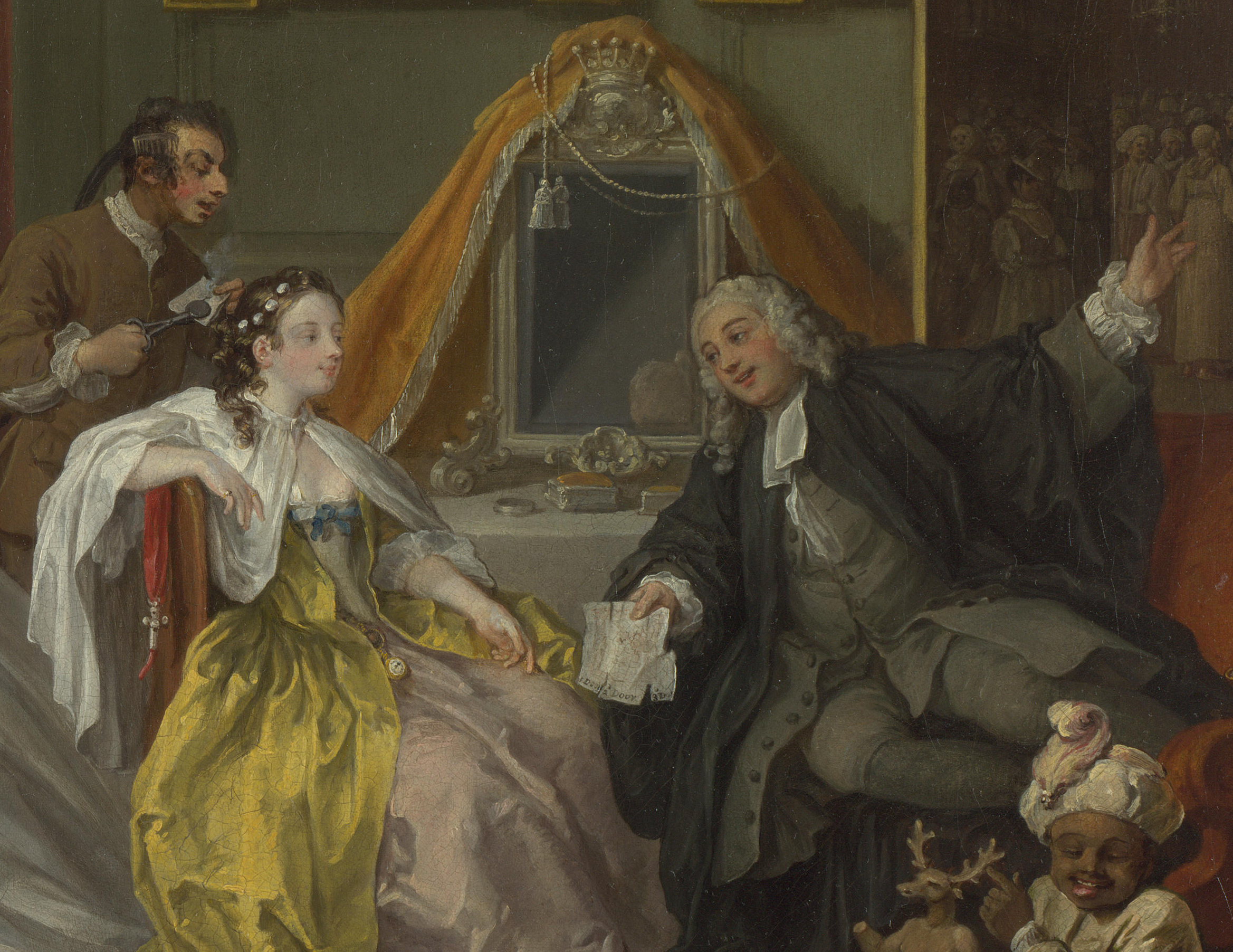
Detail of William Hogarth's Marriage à-la-mode: 4. The Toilette, 1743

The service often contains one or a pair of ewer and basin sets for washing. There is normally a number of other vessels of various sizes and shapes, some covered and others not, which go by a great variety of names, and whose purpose was perhaps always rather undefined. A variety of brushes might be included, and sometimes a small bell. In the 18th century glass and porcelain items might be mixed in with the silver ones. Services also might contain food plates and cutlery (usually just for one) for breakfast or snacks in the bedroom or dressing room, or when travelling. One large type of bowl is connected with oatmeal, though it seems this might either be made into a facial, or eaten as porridge (or both, with a pair). Descriptions include items such as comb-boxes, glove-trays, soap-boxes, low tazze (or "waiters"), salvers, ecuelles (small bowls with two handles) and others. The 48-piece German Schenk von Stauffenberg service (1740s, now Metropolitan Museum of Art) contains several items for food and drink, including a teapot, and also items for writing, such as an inkstand.

The male service was much simpler, typically consisting of a shaving-bowl (oval, with a crescent cut out at one side), ewer and basin, a soap-box, toothbrush holder, perhaps a tongue-scraper and some boxes and bowls. These started later, in the 18th century, when men began to shave themselves, or have a servant do it, rather than requiring a quasi-medical barber surgeon specialist.

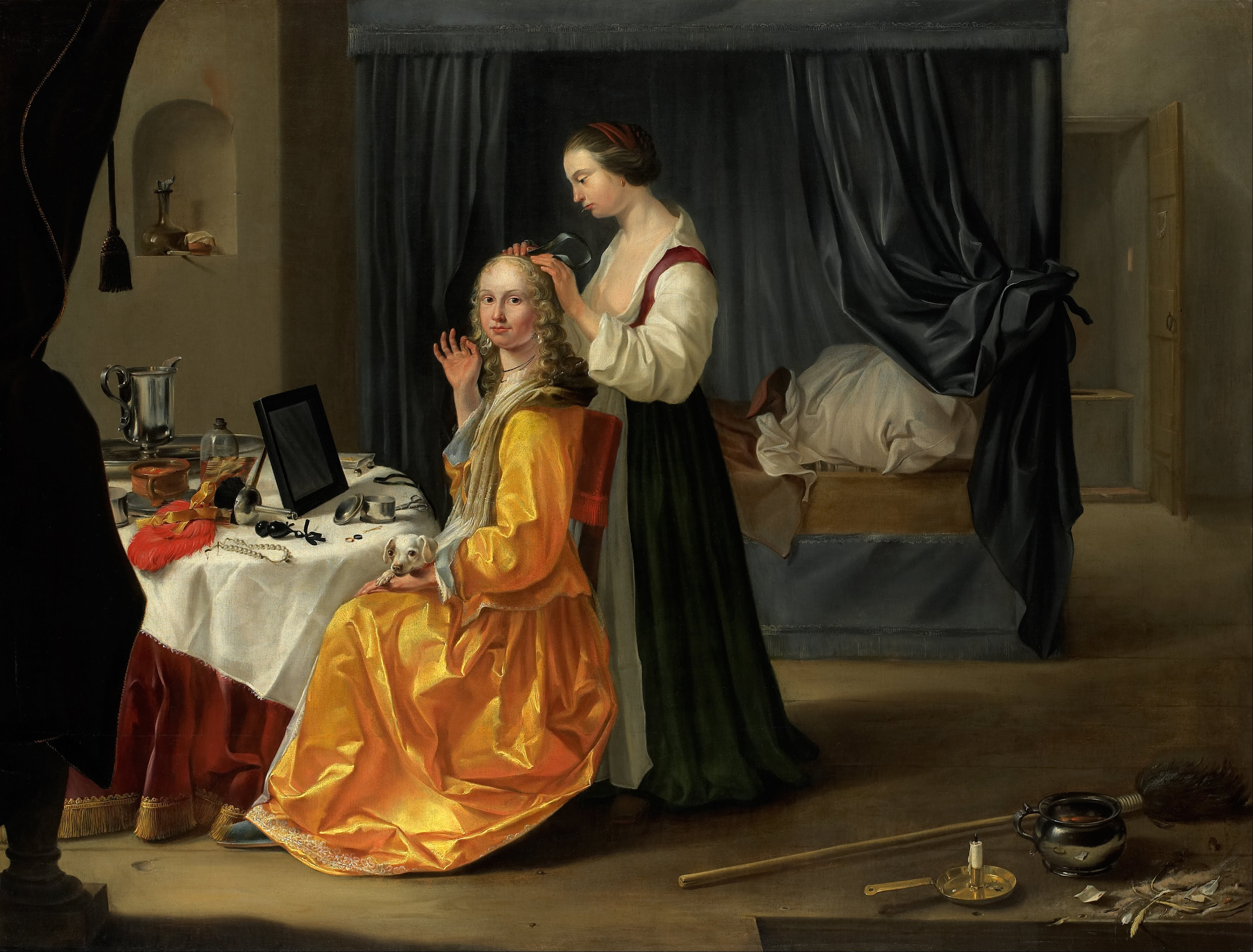
A Dutch lady at her toilet, 1650s

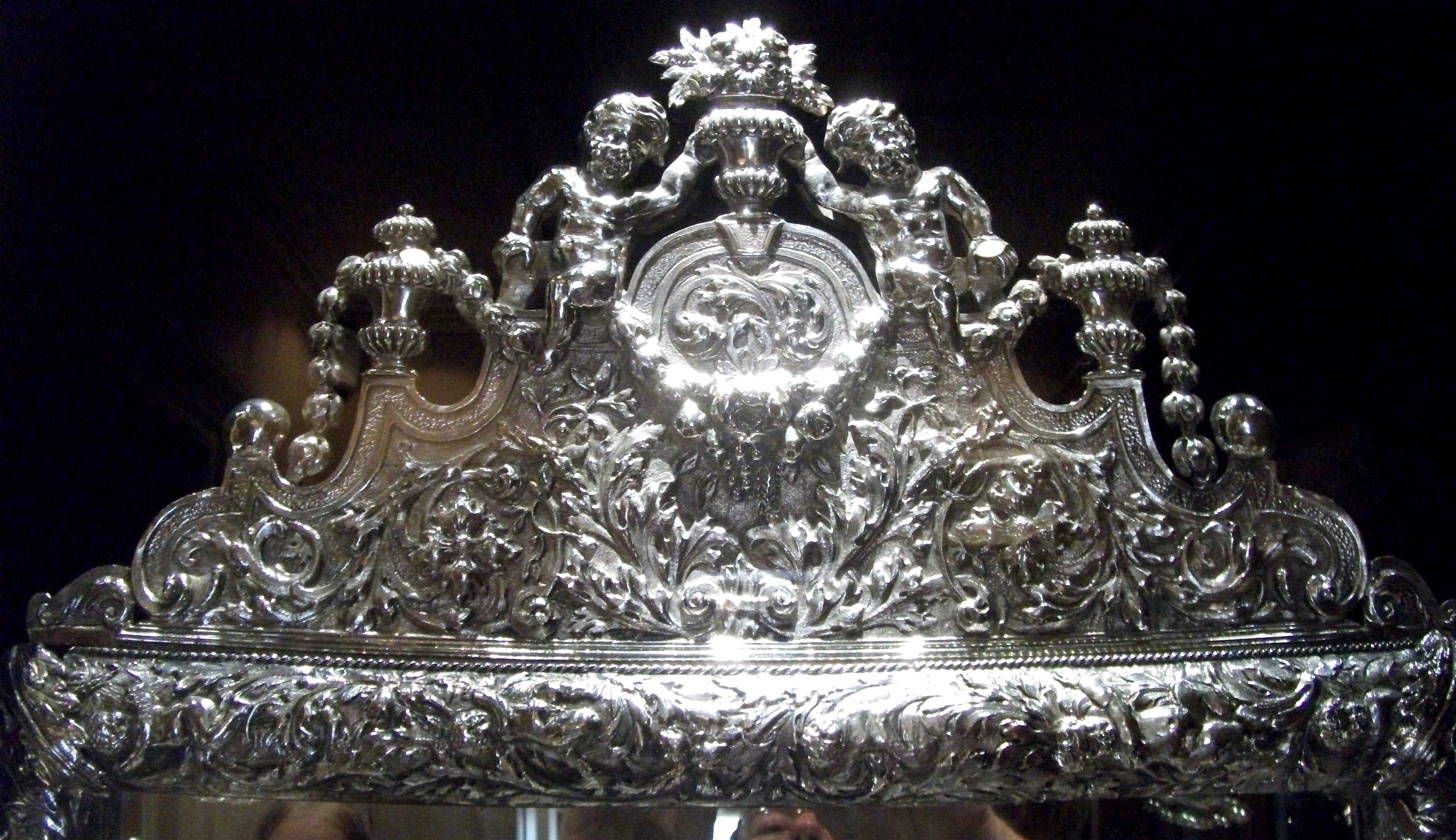
Top of the Weston Park mirror, 1679

In Mundus Muliebris, a satire on fashionable ladies published in 1700, by Mary Evelyn, the daughter of John Evelyn (or by him, or both of them), the toilet service was described. Although by no means an insider at court, Evelyn was able to see the queen's toilet service and his diary records his admiring comments. In the poem:

A new Scene to us next presents,
The Dressing-Room, and Implements,
Of Toilet Plate Gilt, and Emboss'd,
And several other things of Cost:
The Table Miroir, one Glue Pot,
One for Pomatum, and what not?
Of Washes, Unguents, and Cosmeticks,
A pair of Silver Candlesticks;
Snuffers, and Snuff-dish, Boxes more,
For Powders, Patches, Waters store,
In silver Flasks or Bottles, Cups
Cover'd, or open to wash Chaps;...

In the 18th-century special dressing-tables with a fitted mirror began to be made, so removing the need for the traditional centrepiece of a service. Men also had special shaving tables, often on long legs for shaving standing up.

The full toilette did not always occur at the start of the day, but might be before going out or having a formal meal. In the Zoffany portrait of Queen Charlotte above: "... Father Time appears scythe-bearing on the clock, but the face reads exactly 2.30pm, which means that the Princes have finished their dinner (which since November 1764 they had taken at 2.00pm) and are visiting their mother, after she has dressed (a process which began at 1.00pm), while their governess waits in the room beyond. The Queen will dine with the King at exactly 4.00pm."

=== Packing a German service of 1743-45 (Metropolitan Museum of Art) ===
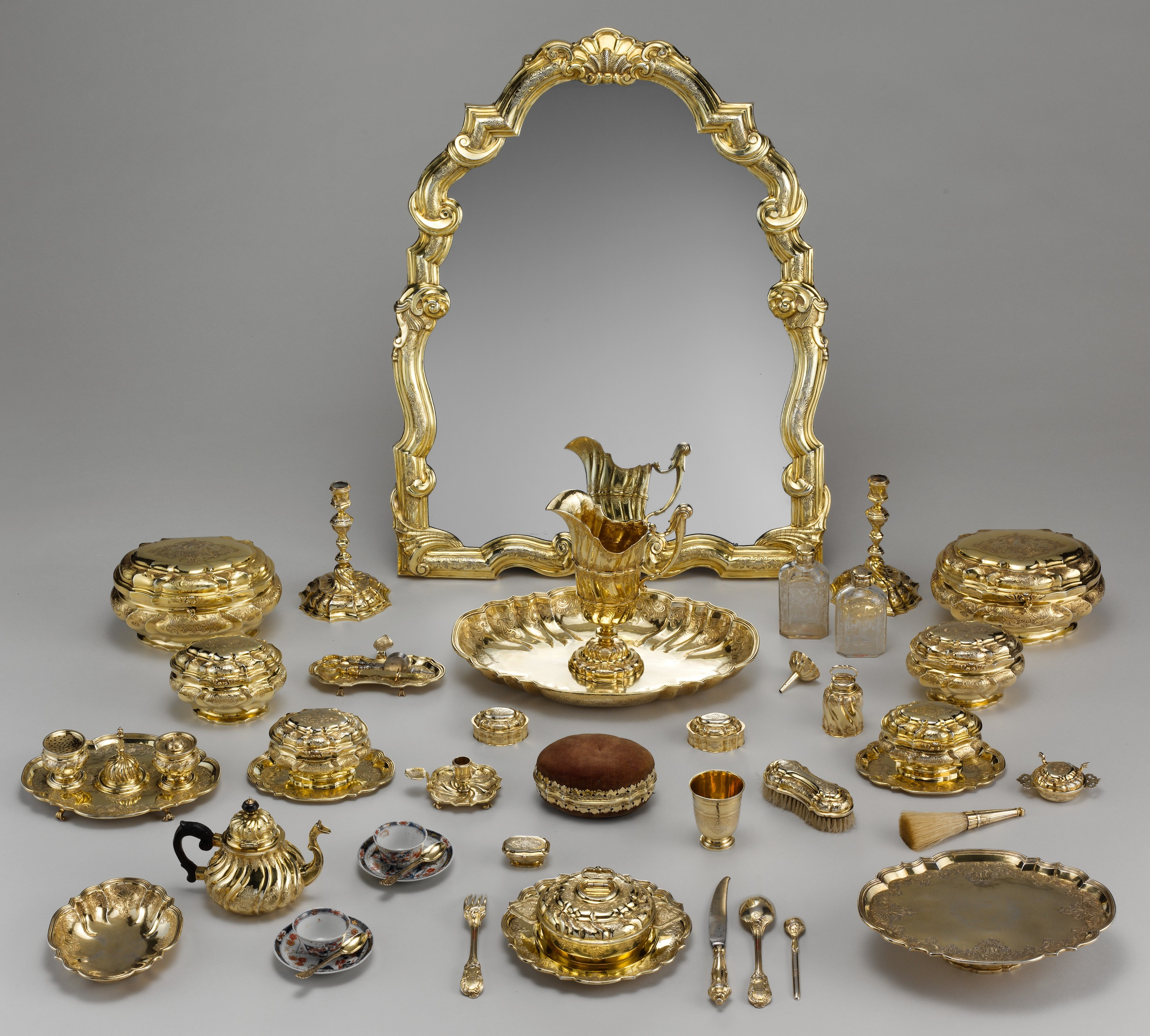
The set is mostly in silver-gilt, but includes two Japanese Imari ware teacups

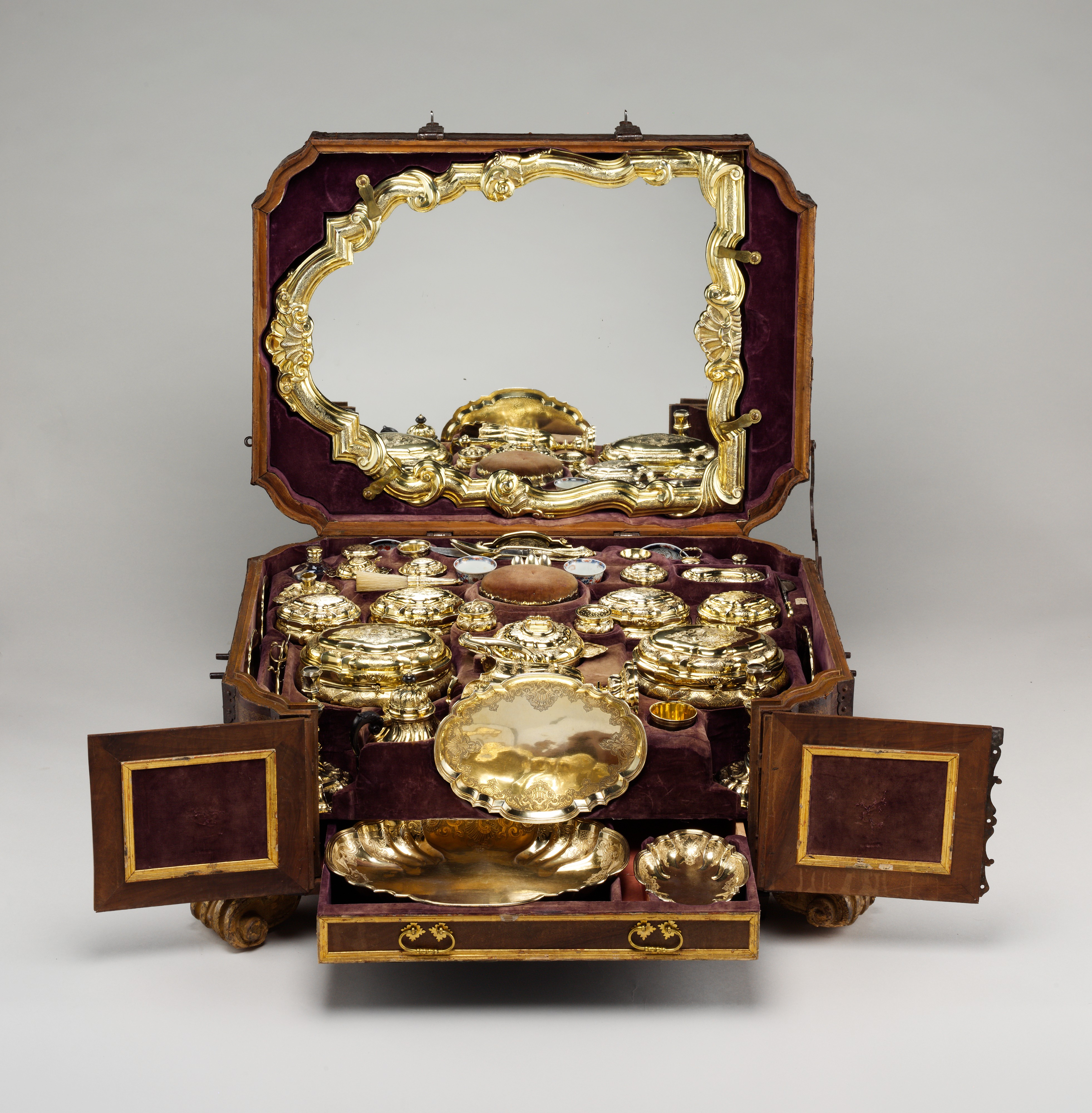
Various Augsburg goldsmiths made pieces

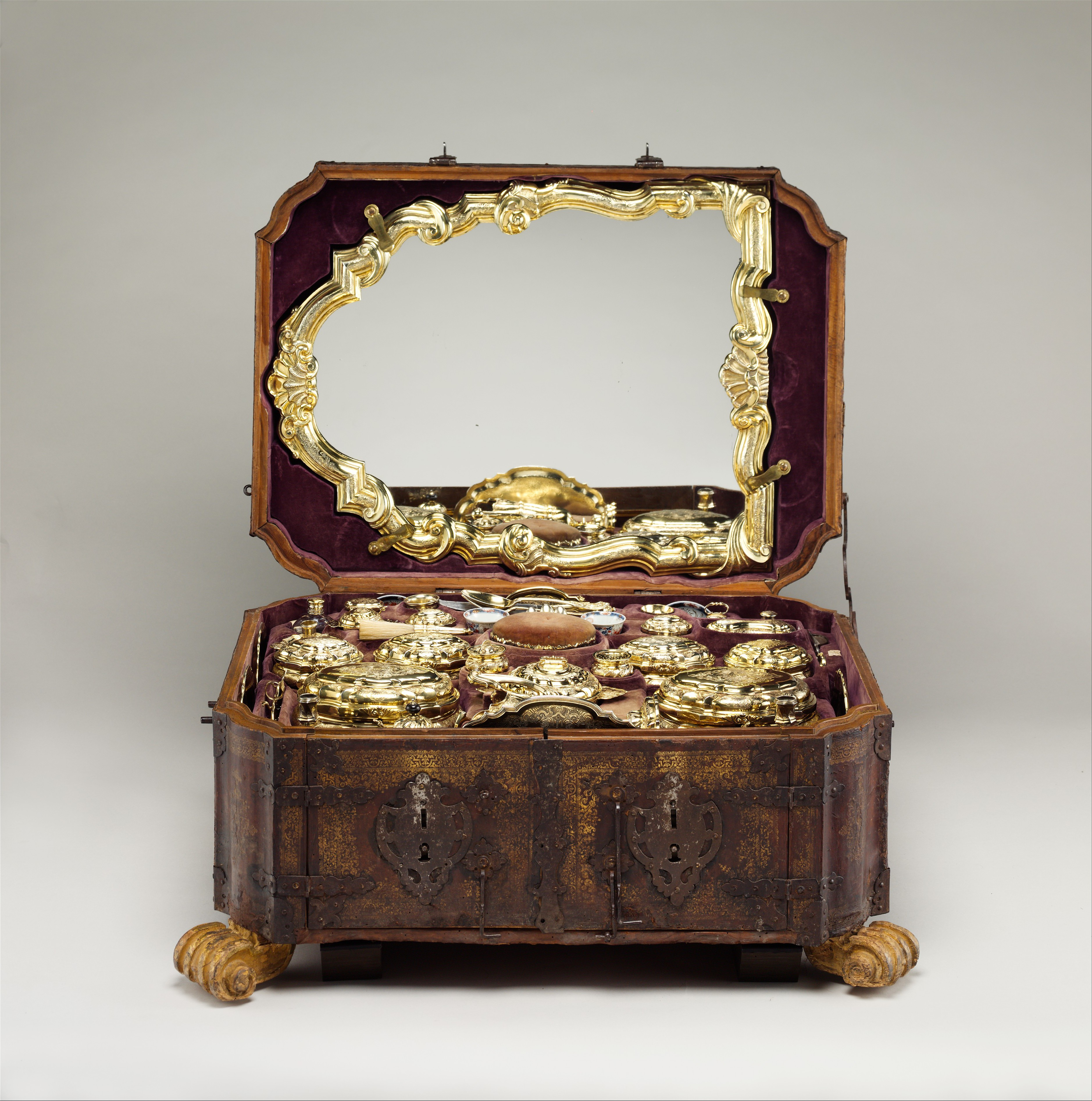
Next a padded cloth protects the mirror

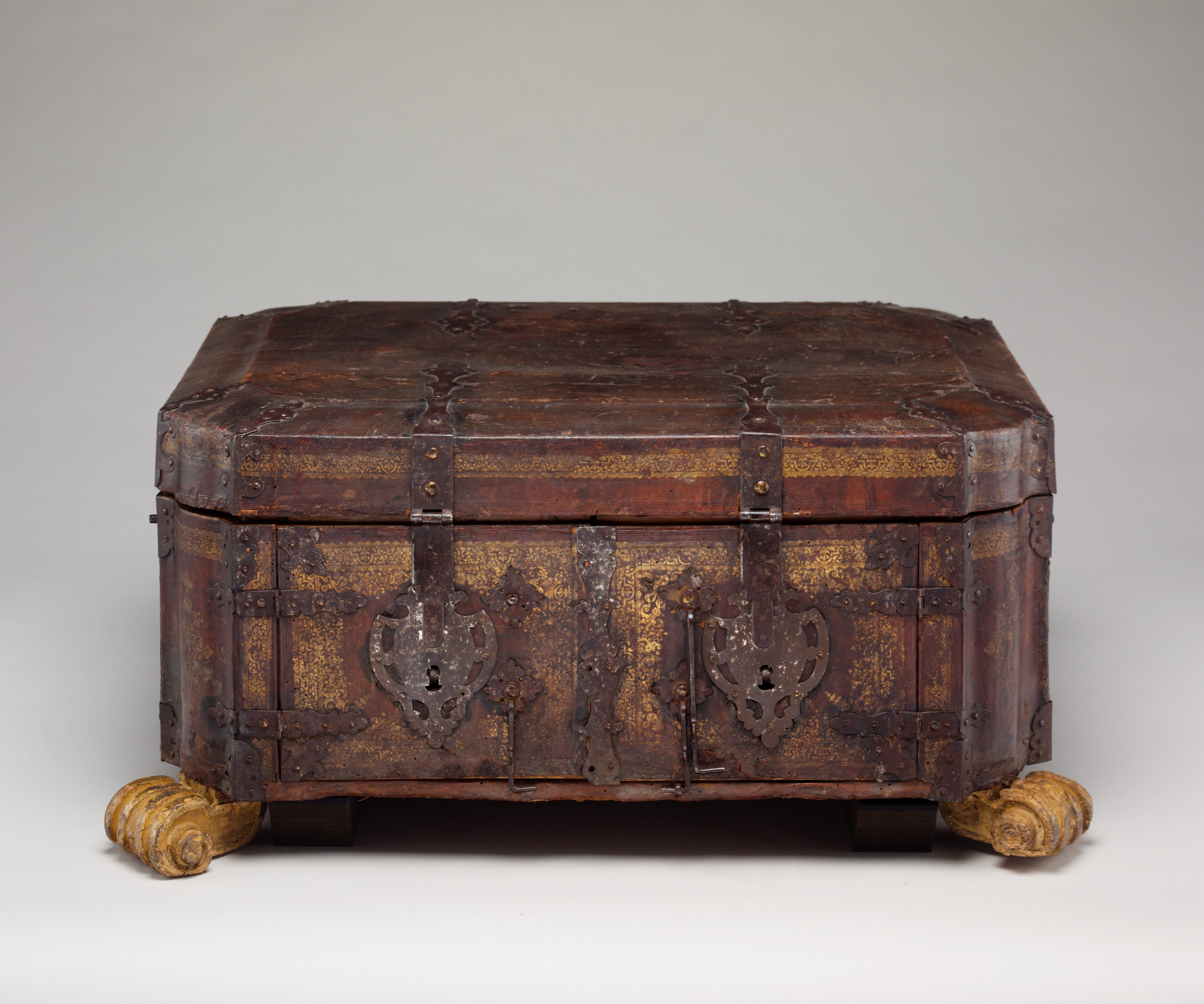
The case is leather over a wood frame

== History and style ==
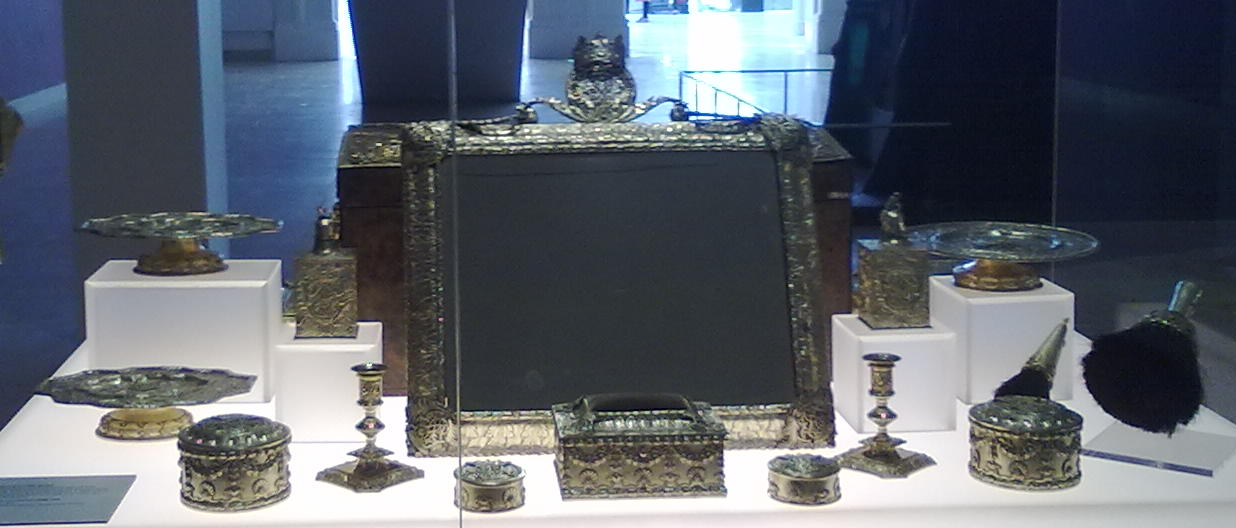
The Lennoxlove toilet service in silver-gilt; its travelling chest on the other side of the case

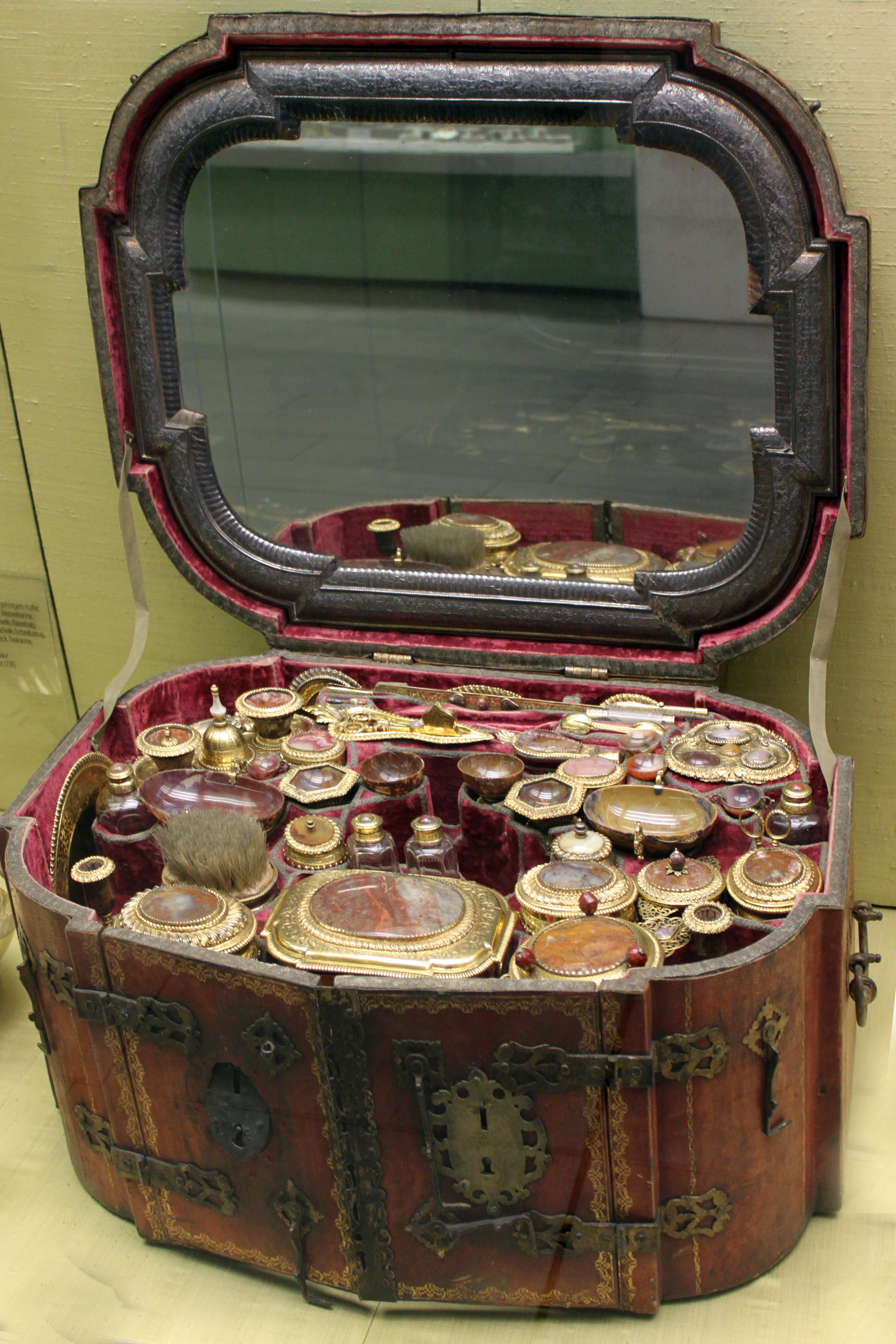
German travelling toilet service, 1695

Earlier examples of the component pieces existed, as is clear from documentary records and stray surviving pieces, but the toilet service as a large matching set of pieces seems to become common among the rich in the 17th century, and especially the France of Louis XIV. Sets of ewers and basins such as the Lomellini Ewer and Basin were a staple of display plate well before this, but the many paintings of the Toilet of Venus, for example by Rubens, show that until about 1650 even goddesses used mirrors with wooden frames. Although many were made, very few Louis XIV toilet services survive, and these are all ones that left France quickly, and escaped the very effective drives at the end of Louis's reign to get the nobility to donate their plate to help pay for the ruinous Nine Years' War and War of the Spanish Succession. Exiled Huguenot silversmiths helped to spread French styles in England and elsewhere. Once established, the characteristic types of pieces changed little, but their style followed general fashions in the decorative arts.

Heraldic decoration with the coat of arms of the owner was very common. This could be engraved, or on small cast pieces attached to the main vessel by bolts. This method made it easier to change the heraldry if a service changed hands to a different family, and is used on the Lennoxlove and other services. It is clear that many services were mainly made up from standard designs, perhaps often available from a silversmith's stock, and often built up taking some individual pieces from other silversmiths working with the same designs. Moulds were also lent between workshops. In the 18th century pattern books became important, initially mostly French, but later originating in England and other countries; these supplemented earlier drawings and individual prints. The sophisticated and complicated designs of the Rococo accelerated this process.

Except for heraldic animals, putti and decorative masks, figurative decoration was relatively unusual until the advent of porcelain or enamel in the 18th century, but a group of English services of the 1680s use the same plaquette designs, of uncertain origin, on the tops of round and rectangular boxes, as well as elaborate cast and chased decoration of foliage and putti. These are a service (London 1683) once in the collection of J. P. Morgan, now in the Al Tajir collection, the Calverly service in the Victoria and Albert Museum, and another. The English Sackville service of about 1750 (Museum of Fine Arts, Boston) has several pieces decorated with scenes of lovers in landscapes.

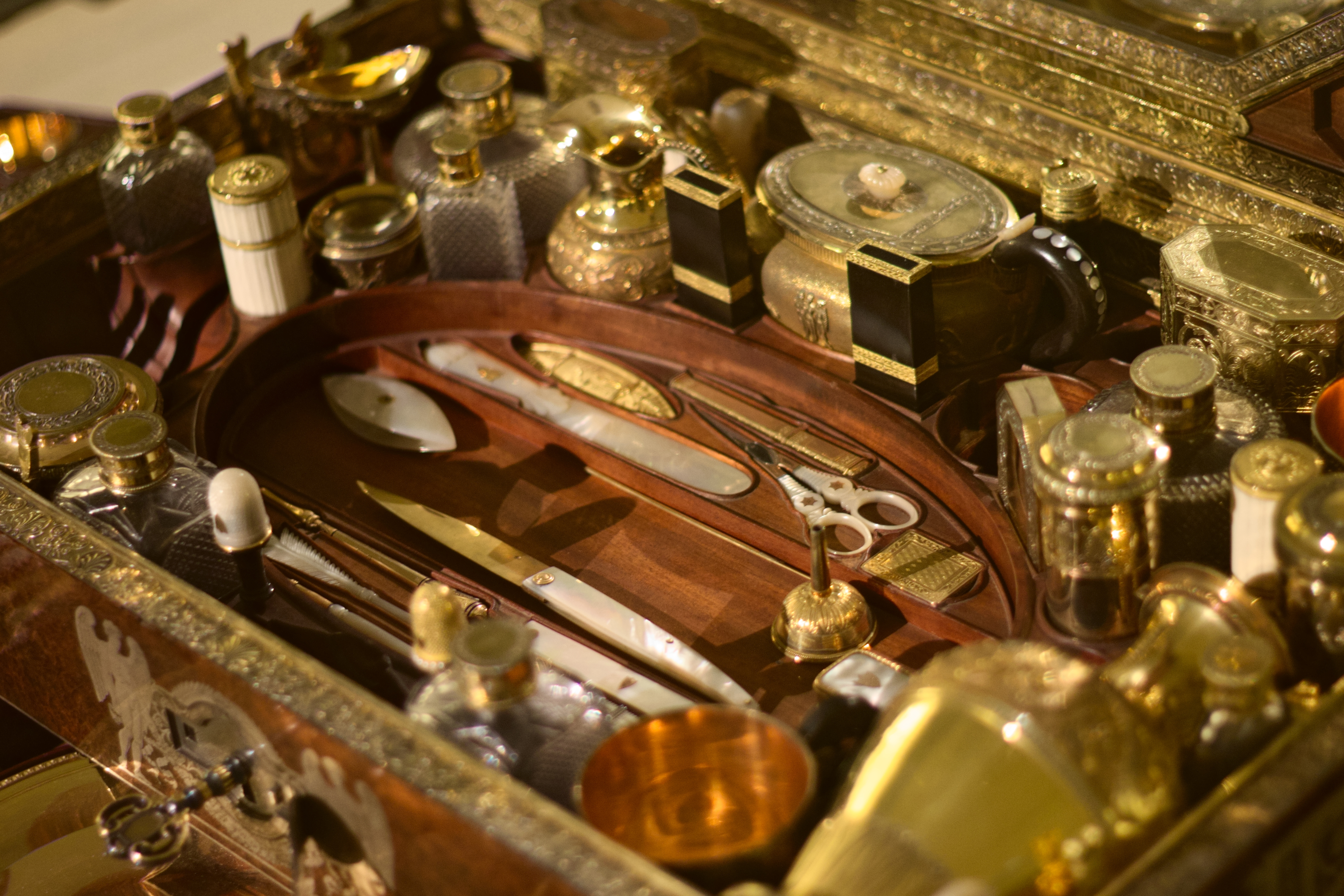
Nécessaire de voyage, given by Napoleon I to his Empress, Paris, 1810

A few services survive in the very different technique of Asian filigree, with scrolling filigree decoration applied to plain silver beneath, or left as openwork. These are concentrated in the Hermitage Museum and Burghley House in England. They appear to come from China, and India in the case of one of the Hermitage services.

In the 18th century services continued to be made, with both the Rococo and Neoclassical styles lending themselves well to dressing plate. By the mid-century the large service was falling somewhat out of fashion, and fewer were made. The depiction of the toilette in William Hogarth's Marriage à-la-mode: 4. The Toilette (1743), with a mirror larger than in any surviving example, is disapproving, and one of many satirical accounts and caricatures. At the same time the development of dressing tables with integral mirrors, and porcelain vessels, represented an alternative style of toilet equipment. The silver-gilt Neoclassical service made in London in 1779, now in Sweden (illustrated at top) is a late English example, and Philippa Glanville describes the Zoffany portrait of Queen Charlotte as showing "almost the latest flourish of the silver toilet service", although George III gave her another service a few years later.

Older services continued to be in demand, and the provenance of several surviving examples shows them being bought and sold, presumably for continued use (see the Shireburn/Norfolk service below). Several services were created from pieces by several different makers from a range of years, as can be seen from their hallmarks; for example the Lennoxlove service contains hallmarks from a period of some 15 years. A service in the Royal Collection was created in 1824–25 for Frederick, Duke of York, mostly using pieces a century or more old, supplemented by some contemporary ones and a new case.

== Porcelain ==
Porcelain services were produced from the 18th century onwards. Initially the grandest examples were hardly less expensive than silver. What was probably Madame de Pompadour's Sèvres porcelain service of 1763 is in the Wallace Collection in London. She died the following year and the service was probably incomplete and never delivered. Lacking a mirror, it has three pairs of containers and two brushes. When Maria Feodorovna, wife of the future Tsar Paul I of Russia visited Paris in 1782 under a thin incognito as the "Comtesse du Nord", Queen Marie Antoinette gave her a Sèvres toilet service that cost 75,000 livres, though this included decoration in a complicated technique using gold foil, enamel and jewels.

Another large service in Meissen porcelain with gold mounts was given to Maria Amalia of Saxony, Queen of Naples and later of Spain, by her mother Maria Josepha of Austria in 1747, to celebrate the birth of her son. A service in Vincennes porcelain with Parisian gold mounts was apparently intended as a diplomatic gift to Constantinople in the mid-1750s, but was never completed, perhaps because Franco-Turkish relations deteriorated. A casket survives in the Wallace Collection in London.

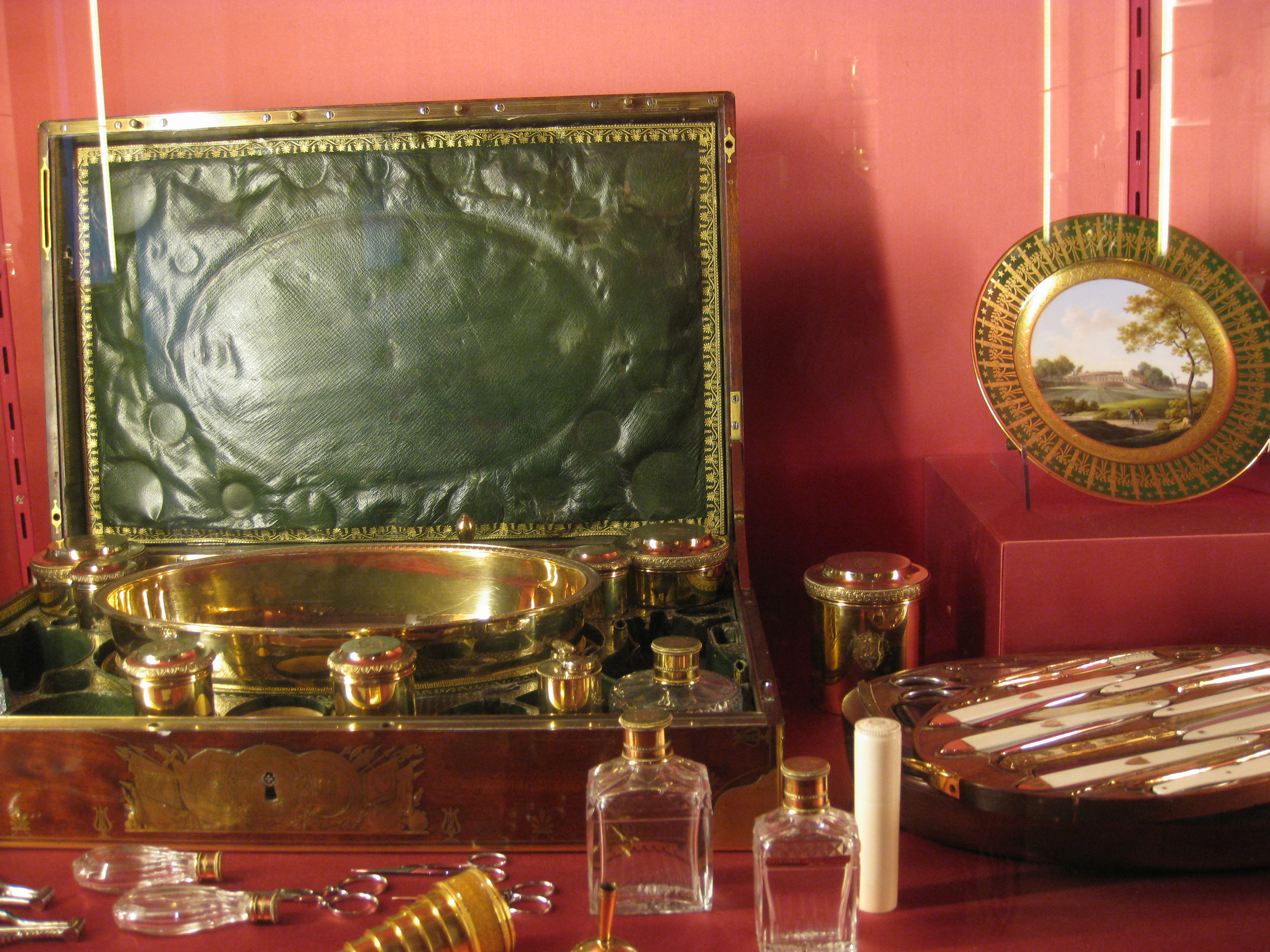
Shaving and bathing set of Napoleon

Queen Victoria's Minton porcelain service, given as a Christmas present by Prince Albert in 1853, remains on display in her dressing room at Osbourne House.

Battersea enamel was also used for toilet items; the Royal Collection has a set of 7 rectangular "toilet boxes" from c. 1765, painted with pastoral landscapes around Rome.

== Travelling services ==
Most services originally had custom travelling cases, as most owners had more than one residence. Some of these survive; the Lennoxlove service was found in its ornate "travelling chest" in the attic of Lennoxlove House in 1924, having apparently been overlooked as the house had changed hands more than once. The Naples Meissen porcelain service, which had an unusually long way to travel from its maker in Dresden, had an individual leather case for each item.

Some services were made with an eye to being compact and easily transportable. The "necessaire" was a term for either a small decorative container for small handy tools such as scissors, tweezers, a spoon, pencil and similar, these also called an etui, or a larger travelling set, originally usually concentrating on small sets of pieces for drinks such as tea and coffee, but later expanded to also include articles for the toilet, writing, sewing, and medicine. The larger cases also became works of art in their own right, with fine inlays in brass. As a frequent traveller, Napoleon commissioned several of these.

=== Gallery of small necessaires and travelling cases ===
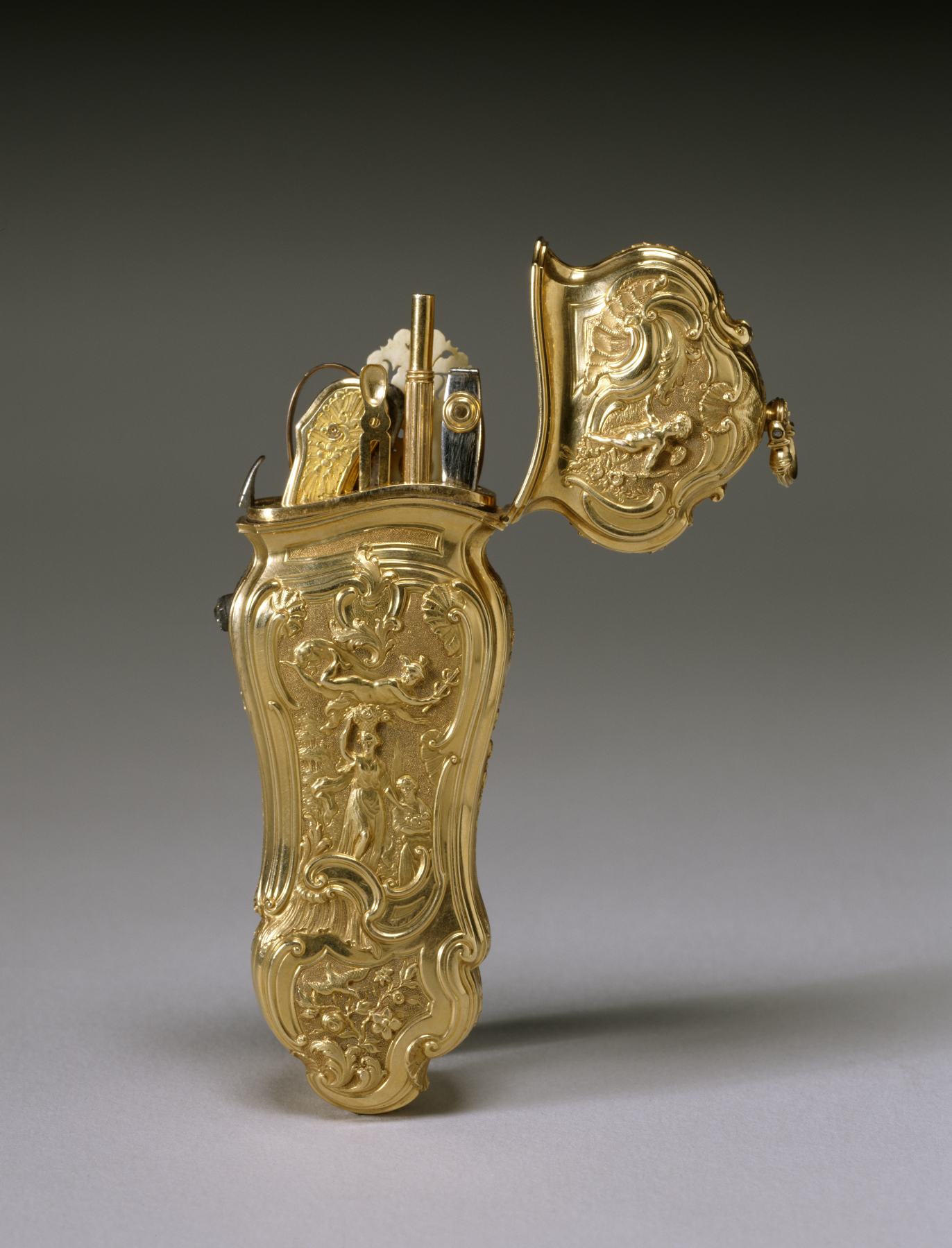
English, c. 1750, Etui or Toilet Case in gold with Scenes from the "Metamorphoses", "contains a silver-and-gold folding knife, a pair of scissors, a gold bodkin and pencil, a pair of steel tweezers, and an ivory writing tablet".

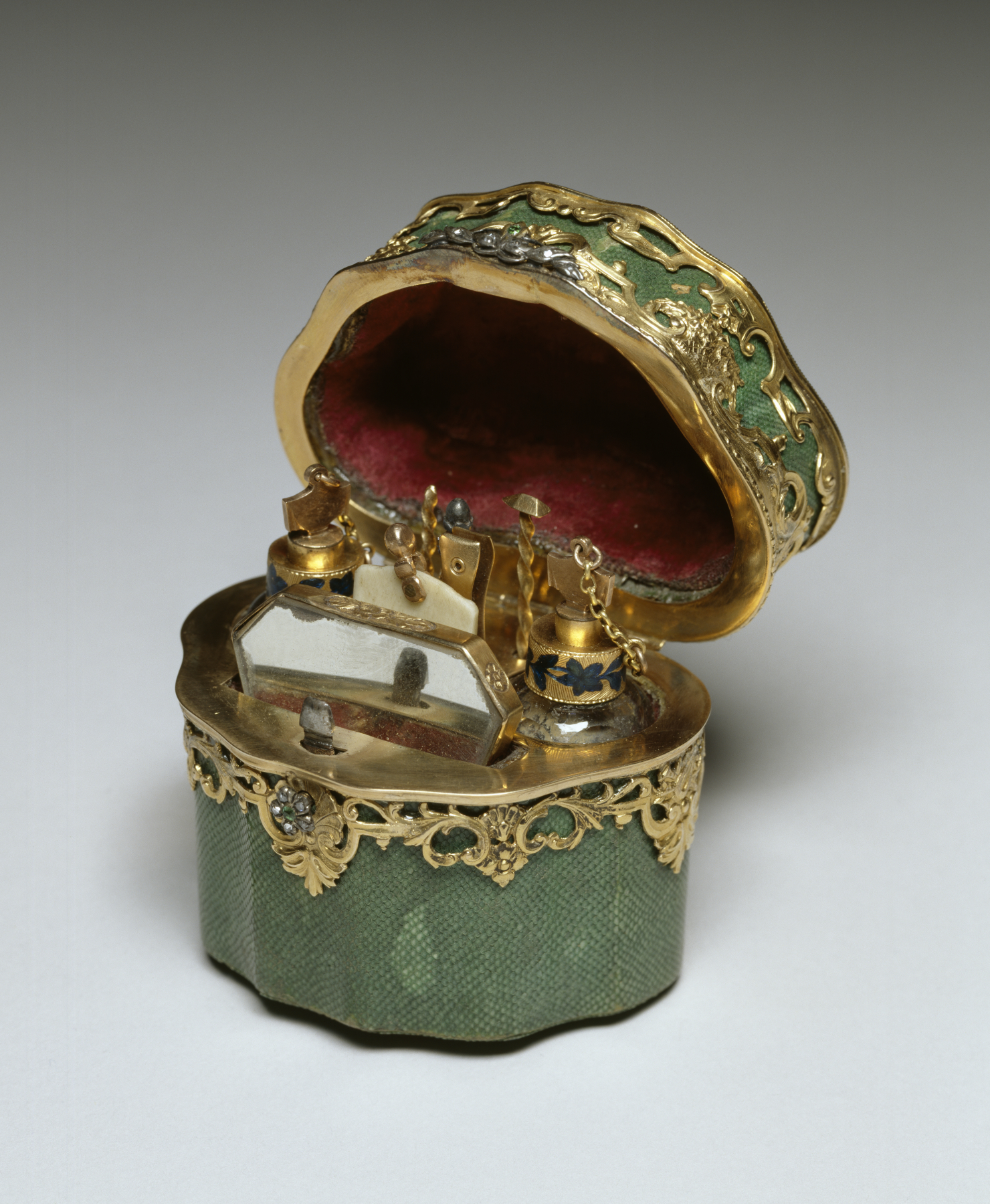
German, Toilet Case, c. 1750, "contains two glass scent bottles, a mirror, a folding ivory writing tablet, a gold bodkin, two gold toothpicks, and a miniature pair of gold tweezers".

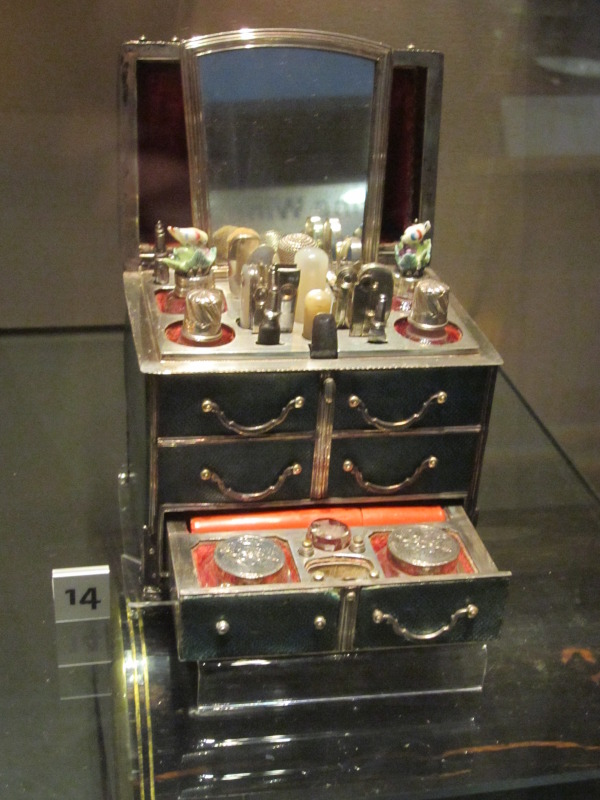
Miniature dressing-case, 1750-1760, sharkskin and silver

== Early examples ==
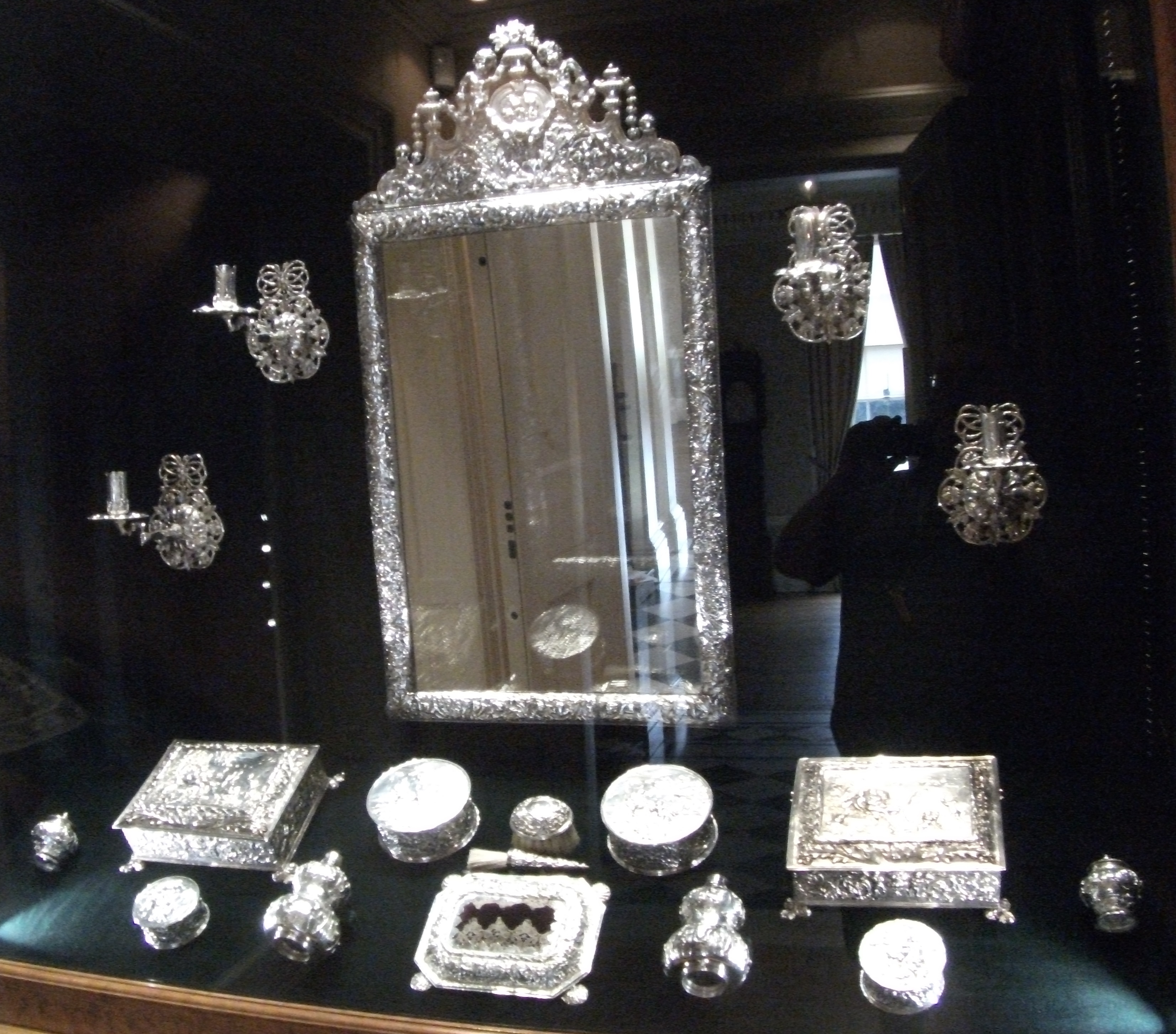
1679 service at Weston Park (sconces later)

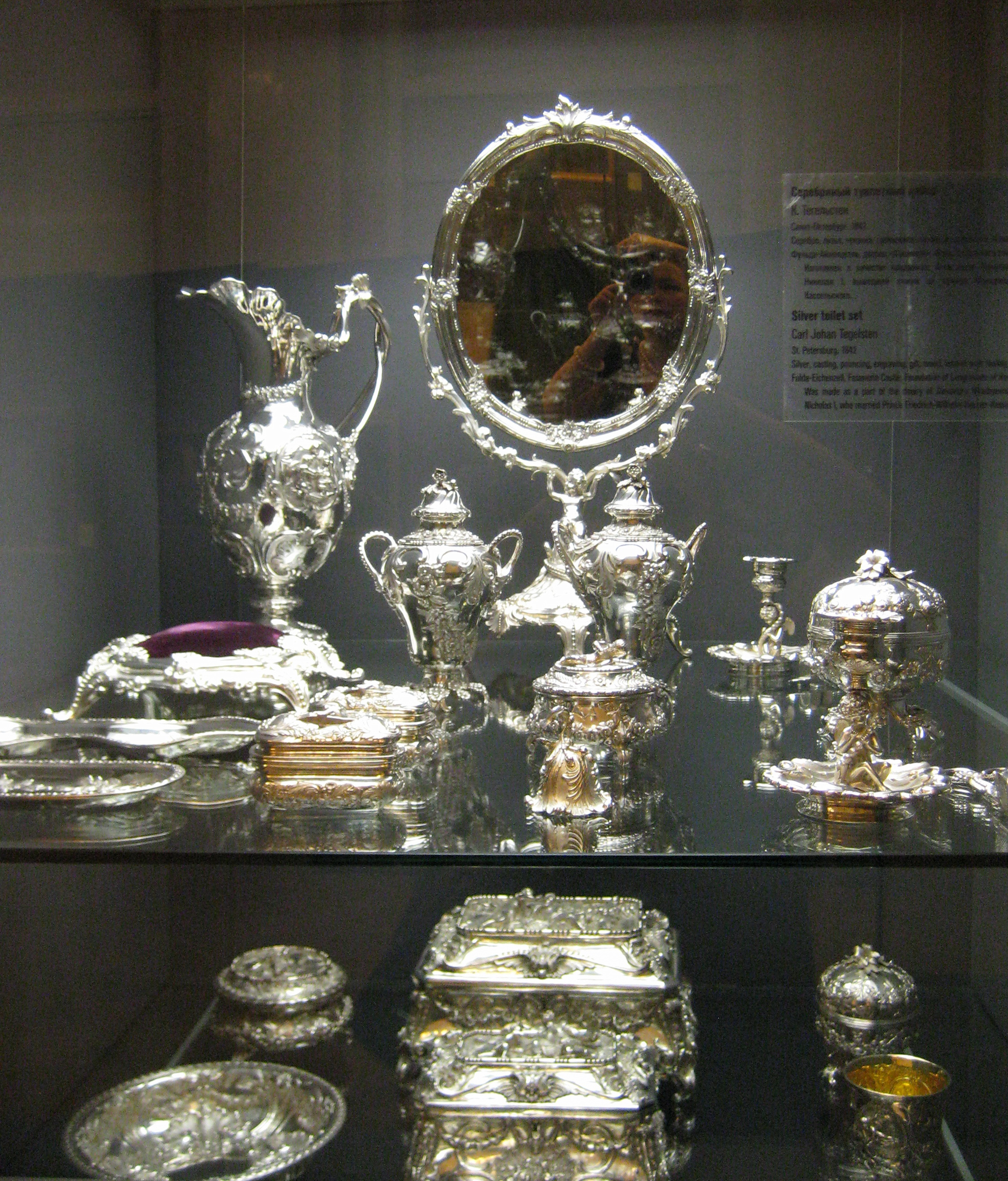
Grand Duchess Alexandra Nikolaevna of Russia's toilet service, 1842

The surviving piece that goes back closest to the origin of the grand toilet set is the mirror from the service of Anne Hyde, wife of the future James II of England, which was made in Paris in 1660–61, and is now in the Louvre. This probably drew from the design of the 40 piece service, now lost, given by Louis XIV to Anne of Austria, which is usually taken to be the first of the grand matching services; this may have been in solid gold.

Only three marked French toilet services from the reign of Louis XIV survive. Chatsworth House has a 23 piece service made for Queen Mary II of England, the Museum of Scotland has the 17 piece Lennoxlove Service, and Rosenborg Castle, Copenhagen has a 17 piece service owned by a Swedish princess. A further unmarked set is now in a museum in Toledo, Ohio; this is "almost identical" to the Lennoxlove service.

Some 25 English toilet services from before 1800 survive, about half now abroad; in 2012 an expert report to the official committee granting export licences recorded only 12 English-made metal toilet services in British collections. Knole House has an English set of 18 pieces made in 1674, the earliest English-made service. The 14 pieces in the service at Weston Park are hallmarked for 1679.

One of these, a 34 piece silver-gilt English toilet service made in 1708, and presented by her father to Maria Howard, Duchess of Norfolk on her marriage was granted an export license from the UK to Australia in 2012, despite objections by the Victoria and Albert Museum. Having cost around £700 in 1708, paid in installments, it was sold for £1,380,000 in 2012. It was made by the leading London silversmith Benjamin Pyne in the "plain English" style, as opposed to the French style used by Huguenot makers. It had been bought by the London jewellers Rundell, Bridge & Rundell as part-exchange for a new dinner service for the Duke of Norfolk in the early 19th century, and they it sold to William Lowther, 1st Earl of Lonsdale, adding his cypher "discreetly".

The Ashmolean Museum in Oxford has two significant examples, the Acton toilet service (14 pieces, silver, London, 1699–1700), and the Treby toilet service (29 pieces, London, Paul de Lamerie, 1724–1725), for which the bill survives, giving interesting information.

== The vanity set ==
By the end of the 19th century, simplified vanity sets were produced in large quantities that consisted of comb, brush, and a hand mirror that can be augmented with a lot of optional items like cuticle pushers, glove stretchers, perfume bottles. Its popularity rested on the "updo" style of woman's hair representing her maturity, being a symbol of a middle- or upper class lady who is grown-up and married, in contrast to the loose hair of the young girls and disheveled hair of lower classes. The vanity sets were necessary tools to maintain the new decorum and therefore were typical wedding gifts to the bride at the wedding. The set was kept in the bedroom, the only place where a respectable woman could let her hair down. In Victorian period the sets had three functions: a tool to maintain an appropriate hairdo, a gift, and an erotic symbol of hairbrushing (and thus flirt).

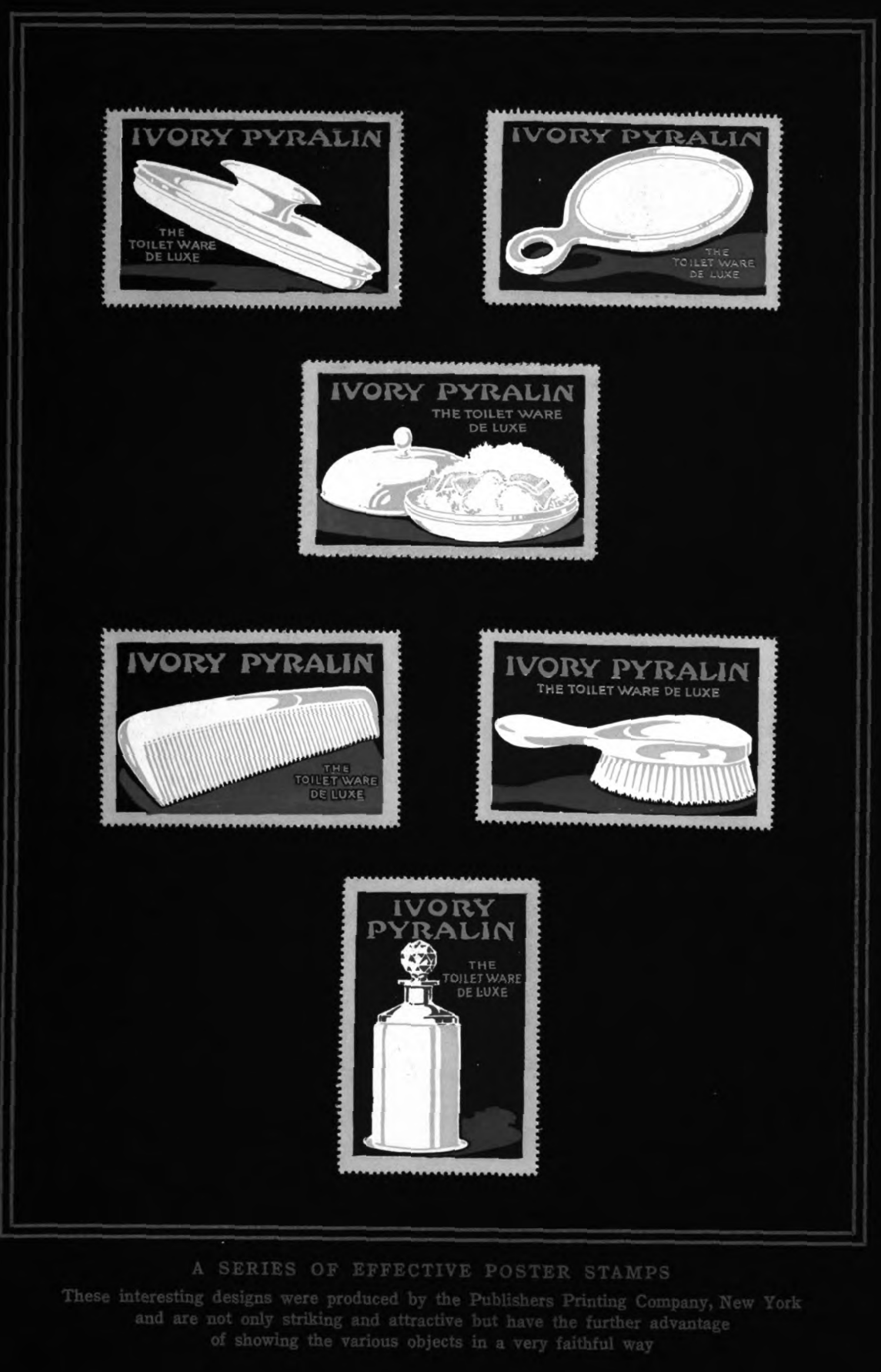
Poster stamps for Pyralin Ware

Starting in 1917, DuPont attempted to introduce a lower-cost set made from Pyralin plastic to expand the market by addressing the needs of lower-middle class. Despite a ten-year effort that involved gender-based advertising addressed to both women and men and redesign of the product from imitation of the more exclusive ivory to unnaturally bright colours, DuPont kept missing the target: the new bob cut hair style that was popularized by Irene Castle in 1909 and became widespread after the Great War had "entirely upset" the hair accessory trade, as a simple comb was sufficient to maintain the new hairdo. The onset of the Great Depression led some department stores to stop offering the sets in 1931; the market was gone altogether by 1937.

== Museum pages ==
- The Lennoxlove service in the National Museum of Scotland, Edinburgh, link, Paris, 1652–72
- The Calverley service, London, 1683–84, Victoria and Albert Museum
- An English service of 1687–88, in the Metropolitan Museum of Art, New York, overall picture, including a mirror, pin-cushion and two scent bottles,
- Royal Collection, Edward Farrell and others, hallmarks 1699-1824, in 2016 on display at Hampton Court Palace?; Martin Guillaume Biennais (1764–1843), Travelling service 1800-15, for Stéphanie de Beauharnais
- "Washbowl bearing the arms of the Duchess of Orléans, legitimate daughter of Louis XIV and Madame de Montespan", Paris, 1719–20, Louvre
- The Kildare Toilet Service by David Willaume, 1722, Art Fund, now in the Ulster Museum
- Schenk von Stauffenberg service, German, 1740s, Metropolitan Museum of Art.
- The Sackville service, about 1750, Museum of Fine Arts, Boston
- The Williams-Wynn service in the National Museum of Wales, Cardiff link,
- Silver and shagreen 5-piece service, John Paul Cooper, 1925-9, Victoria and Albert Museum
- 18 Piece Rose-colored Glass Toilet Service, 1940s, Pola Museum of Art, Japan
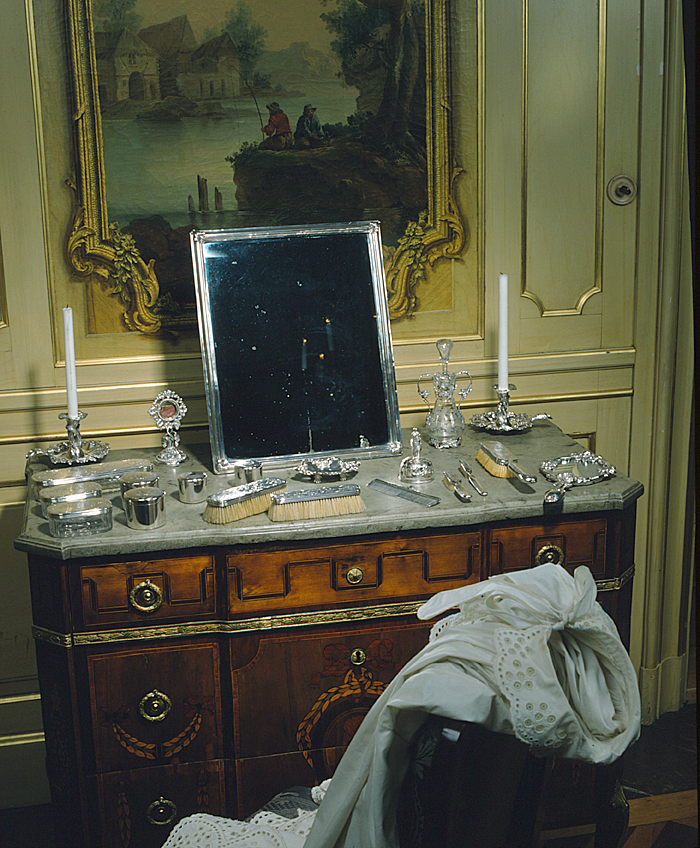
Swedish service, 1697

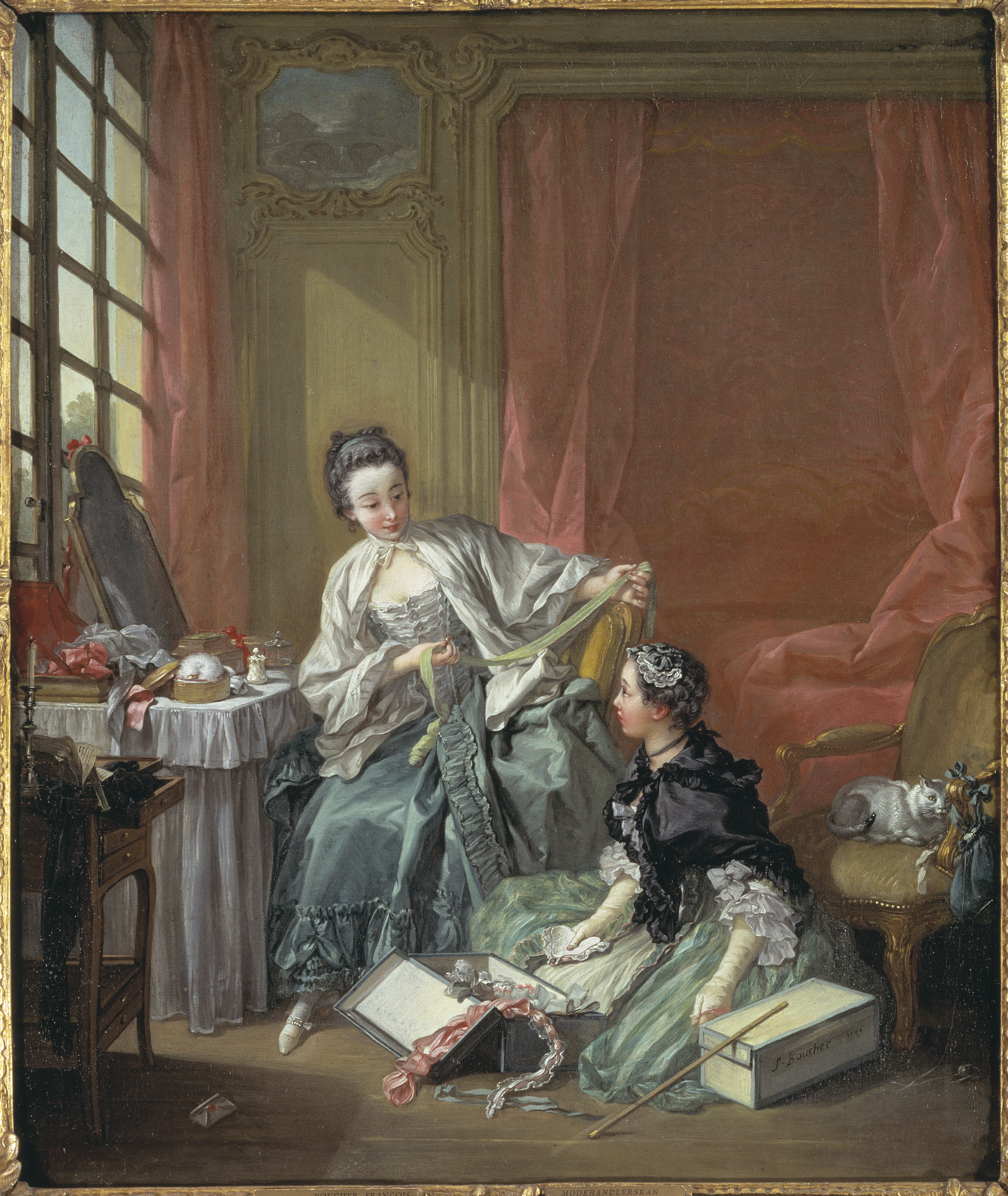
A lady receives a sales call from a modiste selling ribbons, François Boucher, 1746

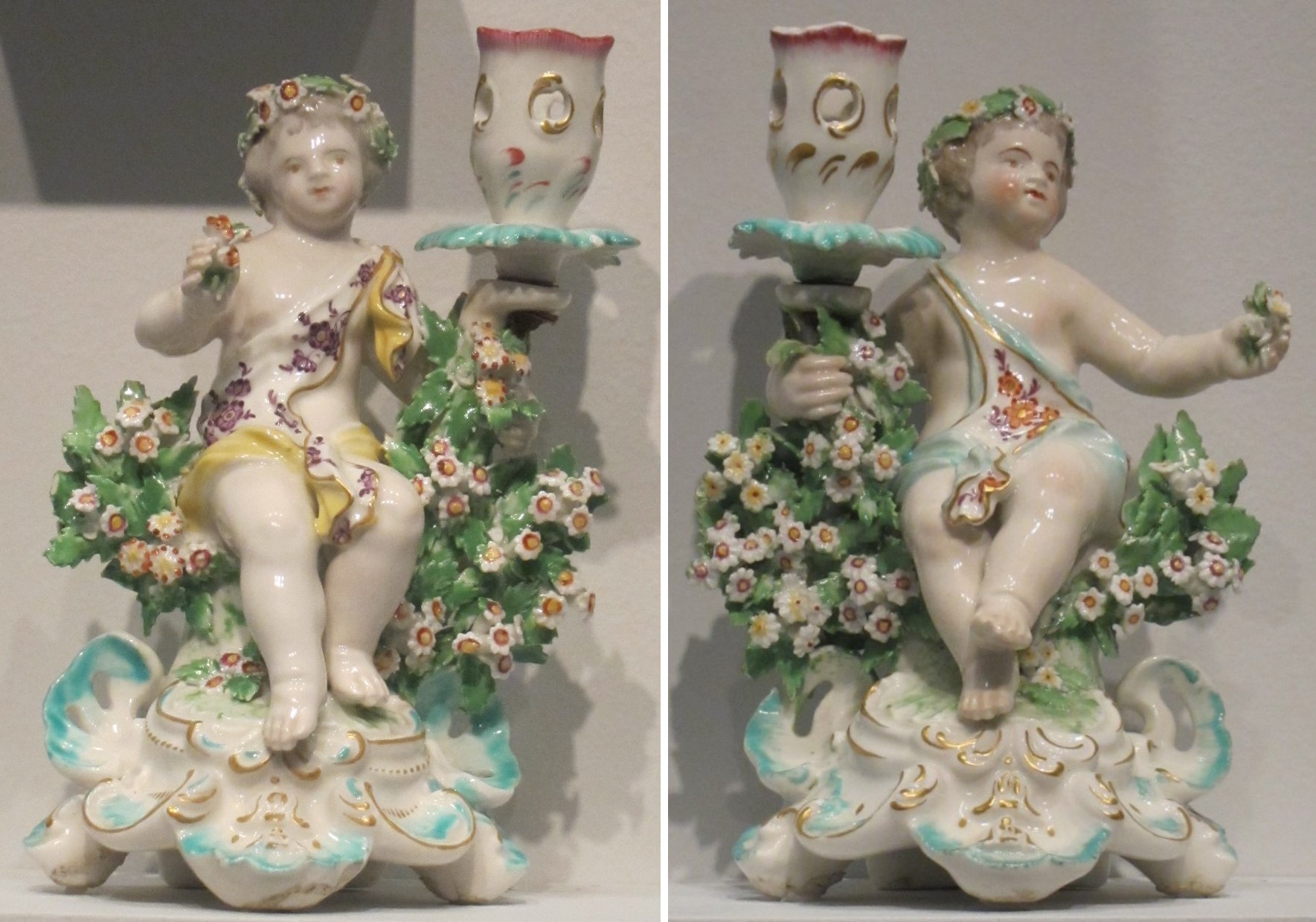
A pair of low toilet candlesticks, Derby Porcelain, c. 1765

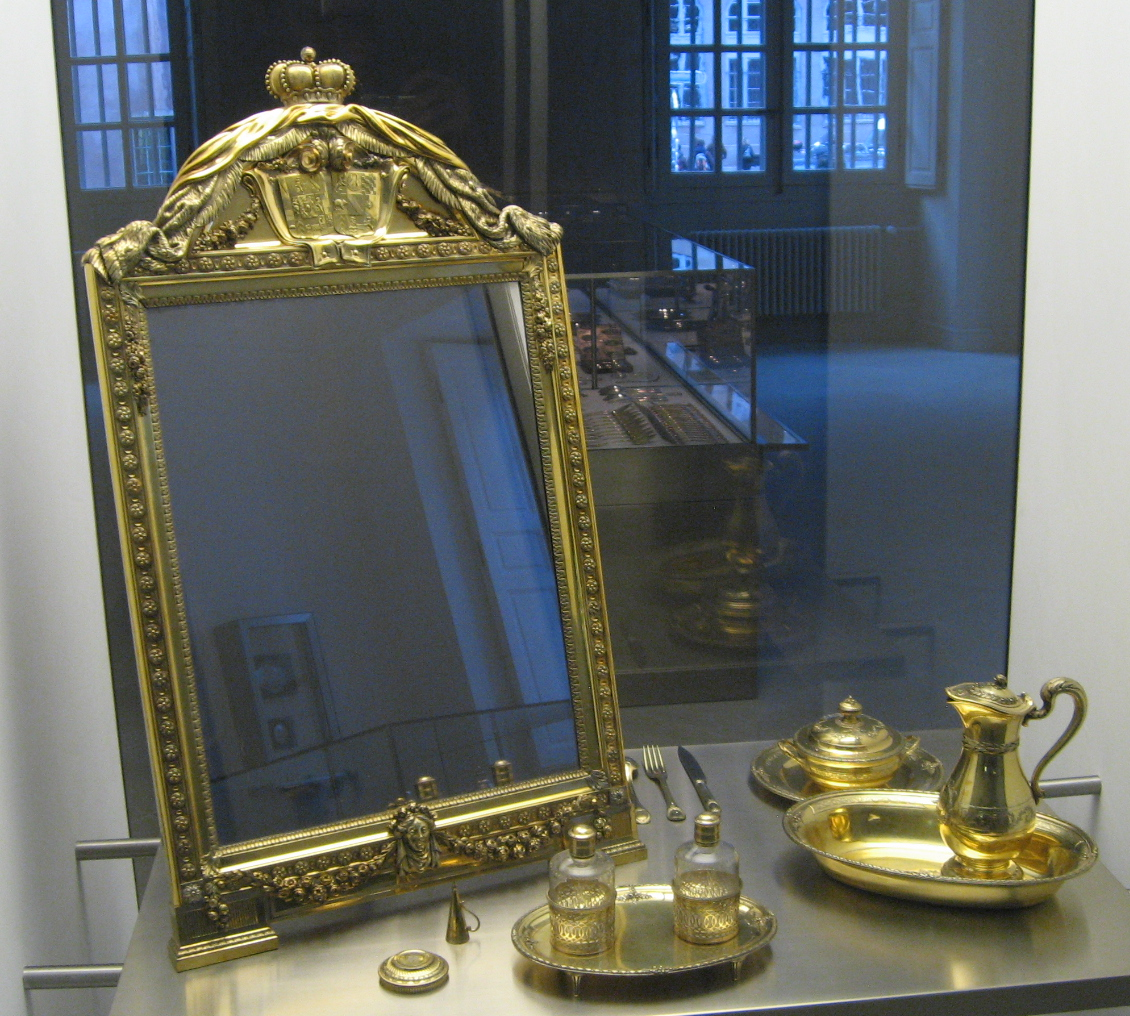
Pieces from a 1780 service, (?) Strasbourg

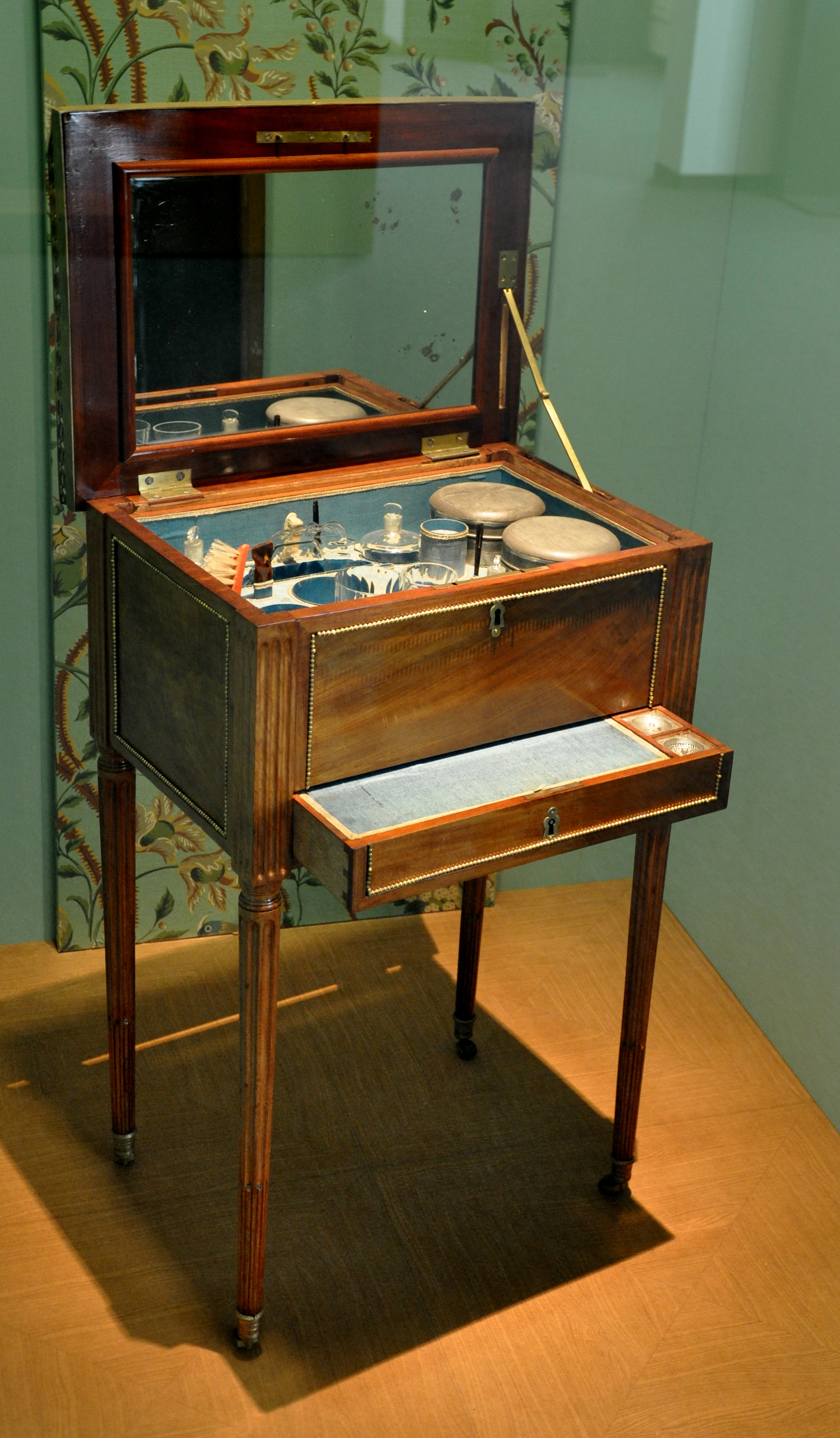
Chiffonière dressing table, Paris, c. 1780

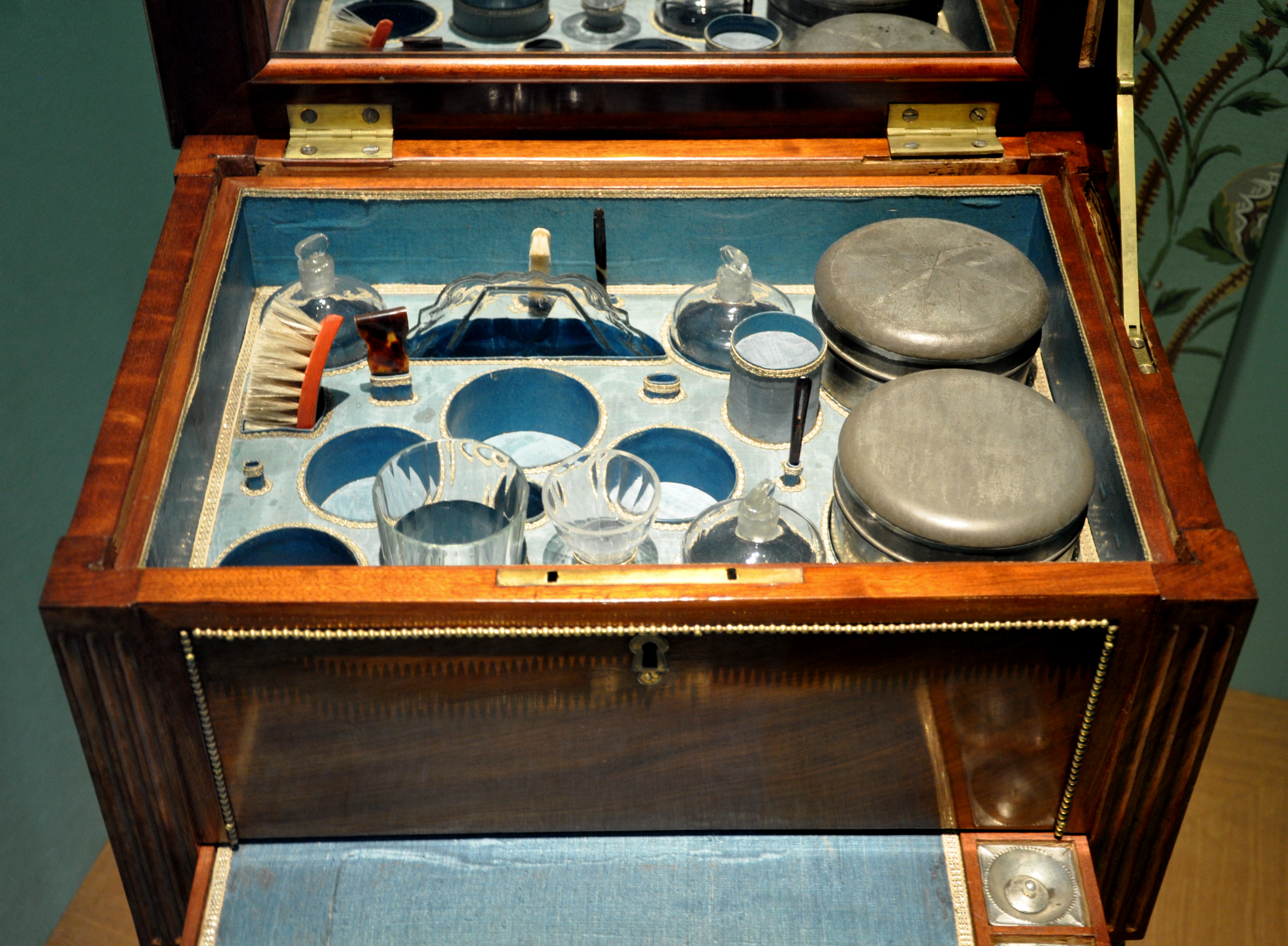
Interior view

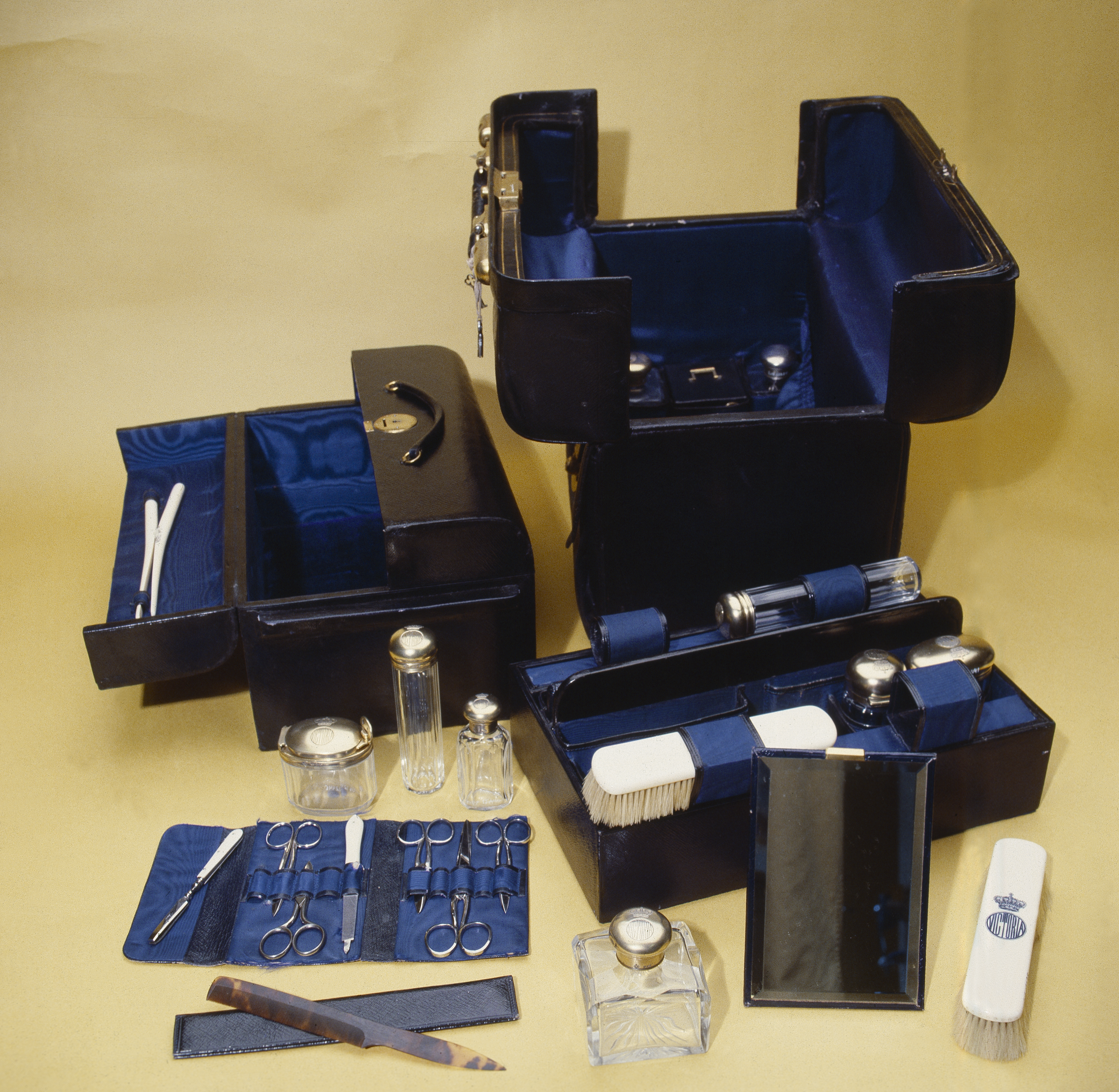
Service of Victoria of Baden, Queen of Sweden, 1907

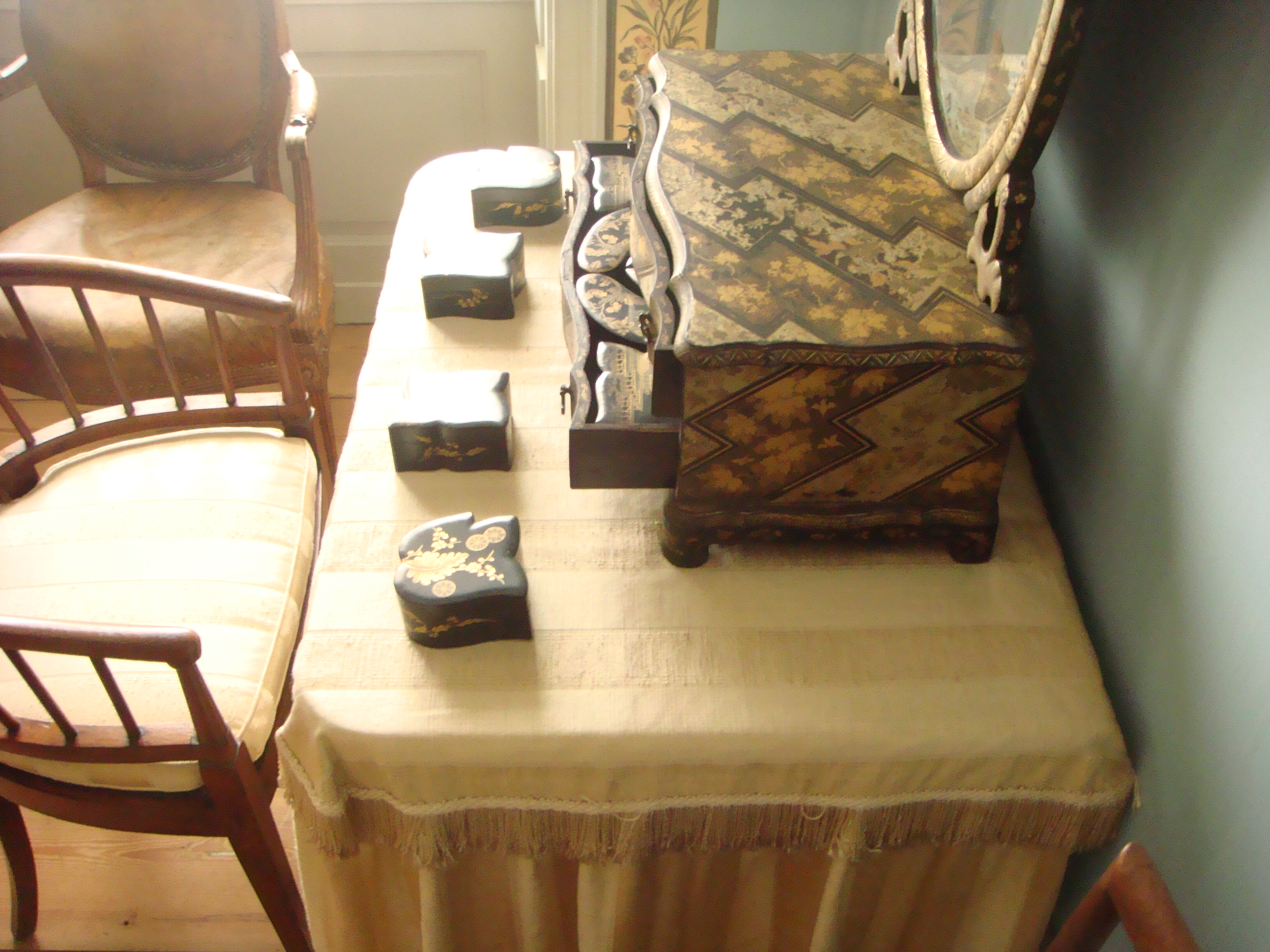
A later service in Japanese-style lacquerware
