= One Galleon Place =

- Interactive map of the One Galleon Place area

General information
- Status: Vision
- Type: Hotel & Office
- Location: ADB Avenue, Ortigas Center, Pasig, Philippines
- Coordinates: 14°35′18″N 121°03′36″E
- Cost: Php 20,000,000,000
- Owner: Ortigas & Co. Ltd. Partnership

Height
- Antenna spire: ≈ 400 m (1,312.34 ft)

Technical details
- Floor count: 80

Design and construction
- Developer: Ortigas & Co. Ltd. Partnership

The One Galleon Place is a planned skyscraper that will rise in Pasig, Philippines. The building will be the flagship project of developer Ortigas & Co. Ltd. Partnership (OCLP), one of the oldest real estate developers in the Philippines. It will be a mixed use building, the upper half will accommodate a 5-star luxury hotel, and the lower half will be for office units.

In commemoration of OCLP's 75th anniversary in 2009, it is projected to be 75 storeys and at least 400 metres high.

== Design ==
OCLP presented the scale model of the building to the public in March 2009. It will have a curtain wall exterior finish, and will have a pointed roof and a huge architectural spire on the top.

== Height speculation ==
It was also noted that, by following the released scale model, the height of the building was speculated to be at least 400 metres high, including the spire. This was due to the inclusion in the scale model of its neighbour, the 150-metre high J Tower, which was used to approximate the One Galleon Place's height.

== See also ==
- List of tallest buildings in Metro Manila
