= Wynsum Corporate Plaza =

- Interactive map of the Wynsum Corporate Plaza area

General information
- Status: Completed
- Type: Office
- Location: Emerald Avenue, Ortigas Center, Pasig, Philippines
- Coordinates: 14.5858°N 121.0615°E
- Completed: 2000

Height
- Height: 131.91 m (432.78 ft)

Technical details
- Floor count: 35
- Lifts/elevators: 11

Design and construction
- Architecture firm: Pimentel Rodriguez Simbulan & Partners

Wynsum Corporate Plaza is a 35-storey office skyscraper in Ortigas Center, in Pasig City. The building is equipped with a double glazed curtain wall system for additional energy and efficient cooling complemented by a combination of a polished red granite exterior wall and composite cladding. It also has 11 elevators.
