= Philippine Fashion Week =

Philippine fashion industry event

- Status: Active
- Genre: Exhibitions
- Frequency: Biannual
- Country: Philippines

The Philippine Fashion Week (PhFW) is a bi-annual fashion show in Metro Manila, Philippines, showcasing Filipino designers, international brands, and emerging names. It is the longest-running fashion event in the country, featuring appearances by prominent Filipino and international figures in the fashion industry. The Philippine Fashion Week was founded in 1997 by Joey A. Espino Jr. and Audie Espino.

Models from America's Next Top Model: All-Stars at the 2012 Philippine Fashion Week.

== Origins ==
Philippine Fashion Week was established in 1997 as a fashion event in the Philippines. It takes place twice a year, with shows held in May to present holiday collections and in October to showcase spring and summer collections.

Founded by brothers Joey and Audie Espino, the event was shaped by their professional backgrounds in choreography and formal ballroom dance training, which heavily influenced their signature style of staging and directing fashion shows.

The idea for Philippine Fashion Week emerged in the 1990s, after Joey Espino attended New York Fashion Week. At the time, the Philippines did not have large-scale fashion industry events of a similar kind. Espino saw the creation of a national fashion week as a way to place the country more visibly on the fashion calendar.

Joey Espino’s involvement in fashion shows began at a young age. At 17, he directed his first fashion show at the Hilton Manila.

The founders chose the name “Philippine Fashion Week” to emphasize national representation, rather than focusing on a particular group or segment of the industry.

== Sponsorship ==
Philippine Fashion Week is annually presented by Runway Productions, CalCarries, EsAC, and the Masters School for Models. In previous seasons, Philippine Fashion Week was sponsored by MasterCard, L'Oréal Paris, Maybelline New York, Power Mac Center, Beats by Dre, Moshi, Gosh, Knomo London, Happy Plugs Stockholm, Case Mate, BDO, SM Residences, Hamilo Coast, Pico de Loro Club, Ipanema, Sony Vaio, Sony Cybershot, PLDT, Axe, Pond's, Sunsilk, Cream Silk, Magnum Ice Cream, Nestle, Emperador and Cignal TV.

The government sector, including the Department of Agriculture, Fiber Industry Development Authority, and Burdang Taal, in collaboration with Filipino designers, has participated in Philippine Fashion Week to bring attention to local fabrics and craftsmanship.

Other presentations on the runways of Philippine Fashion Week include SM Department Store's 50th anniversary celebration, A Tribute to Louie Mamengo, A Tribute to Joe Salazar, Salvacion Lim Higgins' Slim's at 50, Project Runway Philippines' Season 1 and Season 2 finales, Ford Supermodel of the World Philippines, and Supermodel Philippines.

== Brands ==
Participating brands in recent years include SM Store's SM Woman, SM Men, SM Kids, SM Shoes & Bags, Parisian, Forever 21, Alexander Wang X, H&M, The Ramp-Crossings Department Store, Rusty Lopez, Bench, Human, Kashieca, Freego, FG, Wrangler, Giordano, Vans, Guess, Levi's, Lee Jeans, Jag Jeans, Candie's, Folded & Hung, Triumph, Wharton, Jelly Bean, Bayo, Plains & Prints, Petit Monde, Barbie 50th Anniversary, Penshoppe, Oxygen, Regatta, Memo, For Me, Avon Fashion, Unica Hija, Sfera, Suite Blanco, Uno de 50, Toblerone, and Mint, showcasing their collection each season.

== Designers and Guests ==
Filipino designers including Ito Curata, Arcylen Moya, Ezra Santos, Oliver Tolentino, Albert Andrada, Jerome Salaya Ang, Noel Crisostomo, Jeffrey Rogador, Sidney Perez Sio, EsAc, Pat Santos, Arnold Galang, Roland Alzate, Raoul Ramirez, Lyle Ibanez, Cherry Samuya Veric, Philipp Tampus, Junjun Cambe, Mixy Dy, Jian Lasala, Randall Solomon, Kaye Morales, Boyet Dysangco, Anthony Nocom, Eric Delos Santos, Cesar Gaupo, Robin Tomas, Lesley Mobo, Frederick Peralta, Ben Farrales, Pitoy Moreno, Michael Cinco, and Aureo Alonzo have presented their collections on Philippine Fashion Week's multimedia platform. The event is ‘by invitation only’, and participating designers pay a participation fee. Each designer undergoes a stringent selection process, and their collections are approved based on design ingenuity.

Notable celebrities and personalities who have been featured on Philippine Fashion Week include, but are not limited to: Nina Garcia, Leighton Meester, Kylie Jenner, David Gandy, Allison Harvard, Dominique Reighard, Katie Ford, and the Miss Shapes. International Filipino supermodels like Charo Ronquillo, Charlene Almarvez, Danica Magpantay, Manuela Basilio, and Paolo Roldan have been recurring guests.

Designers that have been hosted on Philippine Fashion Week have had their pieces worn by celebrities that include, but are not limited to; Beyoncé, Rihanna, Lady Gaga, Sofía Vergara, Christina Aguilera, Nicole Scherzinger, Jennifer Lopez, Chris Brown, Britney Spears, Fergie, Tyra Banks, Paula Patton, Paris Hilton, Dita Von Teese, Emmy Rossum, and Mischa Barton.

== Early 2000s ==
Philippine Fashion Week was previously held at Glorietta Activity Center, with offsite shows, parties, and activities at the NBC Tent, The Rockwell Tent, InterContinental Manila, and Shangri-la Makati. In its early years, the event lasted 7–10 days and featured many international fashion brands entering the Philippine market and group-show designers presenting capsule collections.

The Philippine Fashion Week has been held at the SMX Convention Center, SM Mall of Asia Arena, SM Mall of Asia, and SM Aura, with off-site activities at Peninsula Hotel Manila and Raven Boutique Club.

Since 2008, it had been consistently held at the SMX Convention Center and SM Mall of Asia. In 2019, it was held at the Crowne Plaza Manila Galleria and in 2024, it was relaunched at the Ayala Museum in Makati City.

== Recent Seasons ==
After a multiple-year hiatus, Philippine Fashion Week returned with a one day show on October 15th, 2025 at the Ayala Museum in Makati, Metro Manila. The show, titled "Diamond Heist," in collaboration with Toblerone, displayed clothes from three different designers. Designers Jaggy Glarino, Ram Silva, and Jerome Salaya Ang showcased different works, each inspired by the chocolate brand's new product, Toblerone Truffles. Guests also were invited to participate in an immersive experience inspired by Toblerone's products, in line with the heist theme; the venue showcased a gold carpet and a vault area where guests were able to sample the new diamond-shaped truffle chocolates.

Philippine Fashion Week's return came with new visions, management, and staff. New management under Amorada Inc. and a new Chief Vision Officer, Nikky Nicandro III, are working with the Espino brothers to turn Philippine Fashion Week into a hub for creatives. Philippine Fashion Week is expanding their platform, hoping to showcase all types of Filipino talents, expanding to include six other lifestyle segments besides fashion: Dining, Beverages, Home, Travel, Arts & Entertainment, and Wellness.

== See also ==
- Runway Fashion
