= Asia United Bank =

Bank in the Philippines

Asia United Bank Corporation

- The Joy-Nostalg Center, the site of the AUB Headquarters at the Ortigas Center
- Type: Public
- Traded as: PSE: AUB
- Industry: Financial services
- Founded: October 31, 1997; 28 years ago
- Founder: Jacinto L. Ng
- Headquarters: Joy-Nostalg Center, No. 17 ADB Avenue, Ortigas Center, Pasig, Metro Manila, Philippines
- Key people: Jonathan C. Ng (Chairman); Manuel A. Gomez (President)
- Products: Financial services
- Services: Banking
- Revenue: ₱15.07B(2020)
- Operating income: ₱3.86B(2020)
- Net income: ₱3.03B(2020)
- AUM: ₱241.9B(2020)
- Total assets: ₱315,56B(2020)
- Total equity: ₱35.23B(2020)
- Parent: Rebisco Group of Companies, Inc.
- Subsidiaries: Cavite United Rural Bank; Rural Bank of Angeles; Asia United Leasing & Finance Corp; RediMoney Express Pte. Ltd.
- Website: www.aub.com.ph

Asia United Bank Corporation (PSE: AUB, also known in Hokkien Chinese: 亞洲聯合銀行; Pe̍h-ōe-jī: A-chiu Liân-ha̍p Gûn-hâng; & Mandarin simplified Chinese: 亚洲联合银行; traditional Chinese: 亞洲聯合銀行; pinyin: Yàzhōu Liánhé Yínháng), commonly known as Asia United Bank or AUB, is a universal bank in the Philippines and licensed by the Bangko Sentral ng Pilipinas (BSP). AUB is the banking arm of the Rebisco Group of Companies, Inc. As of 2022, AUB is the thirteenth largest bank in the Philippines in terms of assets.

== History ==
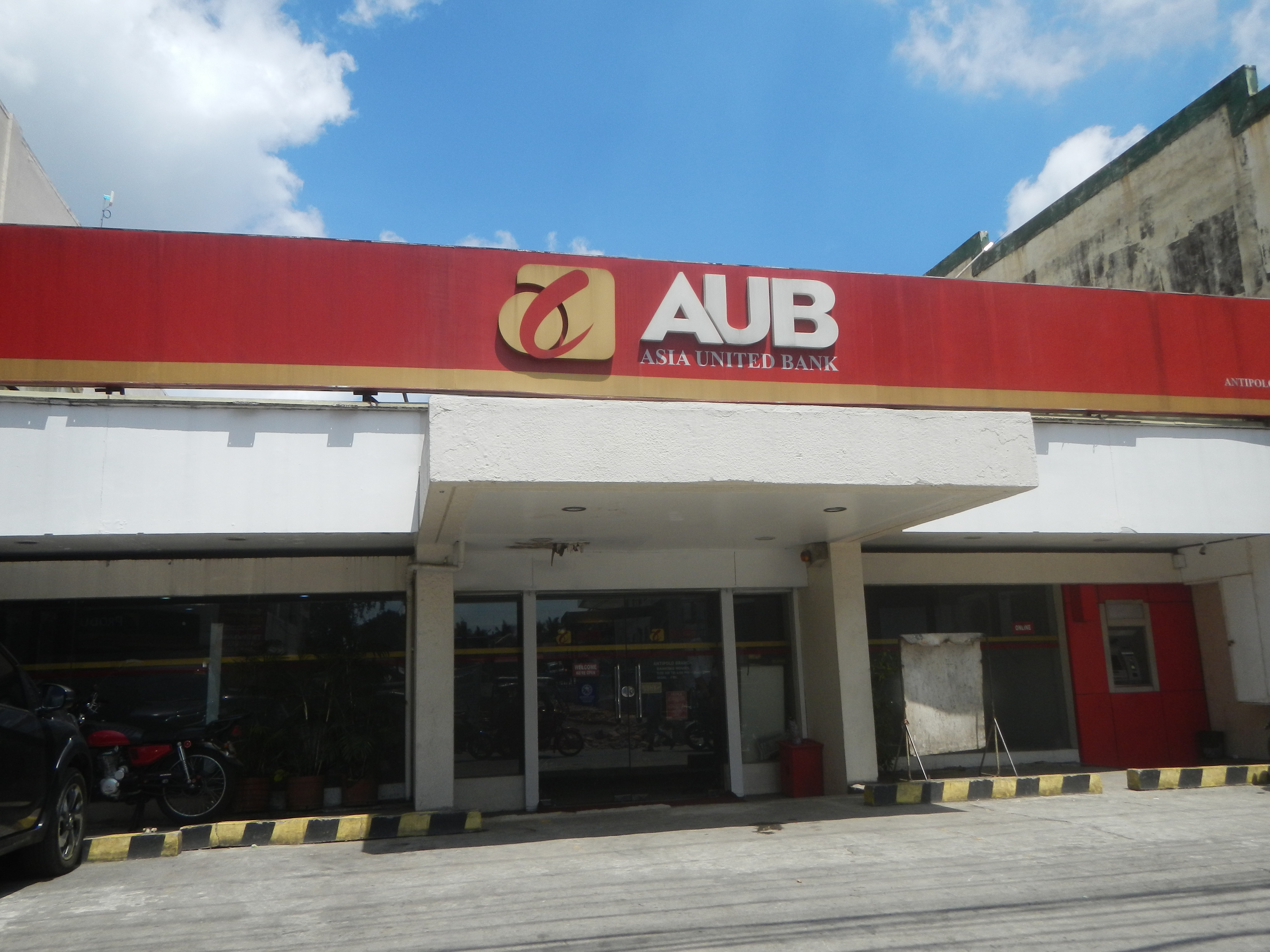
An AUB branch in Antipolo, Rizal

On October 3, 1997, AUB was registered with the Securities and Exchange Commission and started to operate as a commercial bank on October 31, 1997.

In 2013, AUB was given authority by the Bangko Sentral ng Pilipinas to operate as a universal bank.

In 2018, AUB plans to open 15 new branches, which will bring its network size to 264 by the end of the year.

In July 2023, Rebisco president Jonathan C. Ng was elected as the chairman of the company, replacing Abraham T. Co.

== See also ==
- List of banks in the Philippines
- BancNet
