= Rebisco =

Philippine multinational snack food company

Rebisco Group of Companies
- Logo
- Trade name: Rebisco
- Formerly: England Biscuit Factory (1963–1972); Republic Biscuit Corporation (1972–1989) (Note: As of 1989, the Republic Biscuit Corporation operates under a holding company structure as the Rebisco Group of Companies.)
- Type: Private
- Industry: Food
- Founded: August 15, 1963; 63 years ago
- Founder: Jacinto L. Ng Sr.
- Headquarters: 38/F Joy-Nostalg Center, No. 17 ADB Avenue, Ortigas Center, Pasig, Metro Manila, Philippines
- Area served: Worldwide
- Key people: Jacinto L. Ng Sr. (CEO); Jonathan C. Ng (President)
- Products: Biscuits; Crackers; Cookies; Wafers; Cakes; Donuts; Breads; Candies; Lollipops; Chewing gums; Jellies; Chips; Chocolates; Creampastes; Nuts; Peas; Seeds; Ice cream; Energy drinks; Beverages; Cooking oils; Flours; Baking mixes
- Revenue: ▲ ₱5.060 million (2024)
- Number of employees: 1,705 (2024)
- Divisions: Rebisco Foundation Inc.
- Subsidiaries: Suncrest Foods Inc.; Multirich Foods Corporation; SPI Corporation; Agripacific Corporation; SFI Multimix Corporation; Asia United Bank Corporation; Omnipack Industrial Corporation; SFI Fresh Bakers Corporation; RBC Best Baker Foods Inc.; Rebisco Vietnam Ltd.; Action Republic Corporation; RBC Retail Stores Corporation
- Website: www.rebisco.com.ph

The Rebisco Group of Companies, doing business as Rebisco (an acronym of its legal name, the Republic Biscuit Corporation) and also known as the Rebisco Group, is a Philippine privately held multinational snack food company headquartered in Ortigas Center, Pasig, Metro Manila. It was founded in 1963 by Jacinto L. Ng Sr.

== History ==
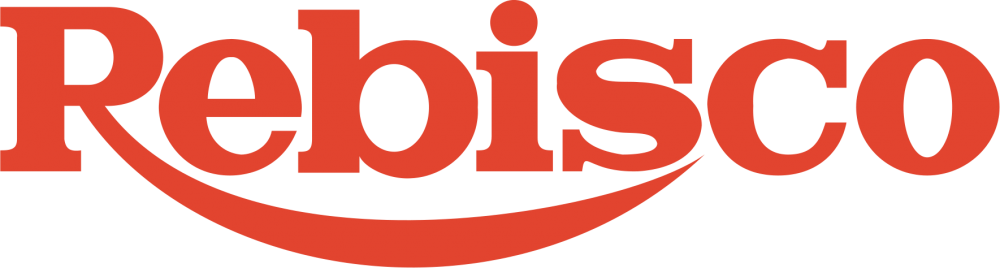
Rebisco wordmark

Rebisco was founded by Jacinto L. Ng Sr. (born 1942) on August 15, 1963, as England Biscuit Factory, producing biscuits from a tiny, rented second-hand bakery, located at F. Blumentritt Street corner M. Salvador Street in the then-municipality of San Juan with only US$5,000 in start-up (approximately ₱15,000 to ₱20,000). The company's first products were Krema (cream-filled crackers) and Sodatine (plain crackers). Eventually, the company moved out of its San Juan site to a new and more spacious factory in Novaliches, Quezon City.

In 1972, England Biscuit Factory was renamed the Republic Biscuit Corporation (Rebisco) and adopted a new image. In 1983, Krema was relaunched as Rebisco Cream Sandwich, that became the flagship product of the company. Through the years, Rebisco put up several companies to dominate other segments of the market: JBC Food Corporation (JBC) in 1989; Suncrest Foods Inc. (SFI) in 1995; Multirich Foods Corporation (MFC) in 1999; and Pinnacle Foods Inc. (PFI) in 2000. In 2003, Rebisco acquired Storck Products Inc. (SPI), which previously produced confectionery products under license from the German company August Storck, and later renamed as SPI Corporation.

In 2006, Rebisco entered the chocolate segment with the introduction of its own chocolate bar brand, Choco Mucho.

In 2009, Rebisco Foundation Inc. (RFI) and the company's newer corporate headquarters at the Joy-Nostalg Center in Ortigas Center, Pasig were both established.

In 2012, the company began operations in the global market with the launch of Rebisco Vietnam Ltd., offering Rebisco Extreme biscuits in chocolate and mocha flavors as their first product, with its international factory was opened in 2015 in Ho Chi Minh City, Vietnam, marking the first Rebisco branch outside the Philippines. In 2015, Agripacific Corporation (APC) was established when the company ventured into the flour mill and oil business, and in the same year, Rebisco entered the ice cream segment with the acquisition of Creamline Dairy Corporation and would be renamed as SFI Multimix Corporation. In 2016, Pinnacle Foods Inc. was absorbed into Suncrest Foods Inc.

In celebration of its 55th anniversary, in 2018, the company opened its first community retail store Snacks To-Go.

In 2022, ahead of its 60th anniversary, the company entered the beverage market as the official Philippine importer of Thai beverage company Ichitan.

In 2023, Rebisco founder and head Jacinto L. Ng Sr. was listed by Forbes magazine as the 32nd richest person in the Philippines, with wealth of US$425 million.

== Products ==
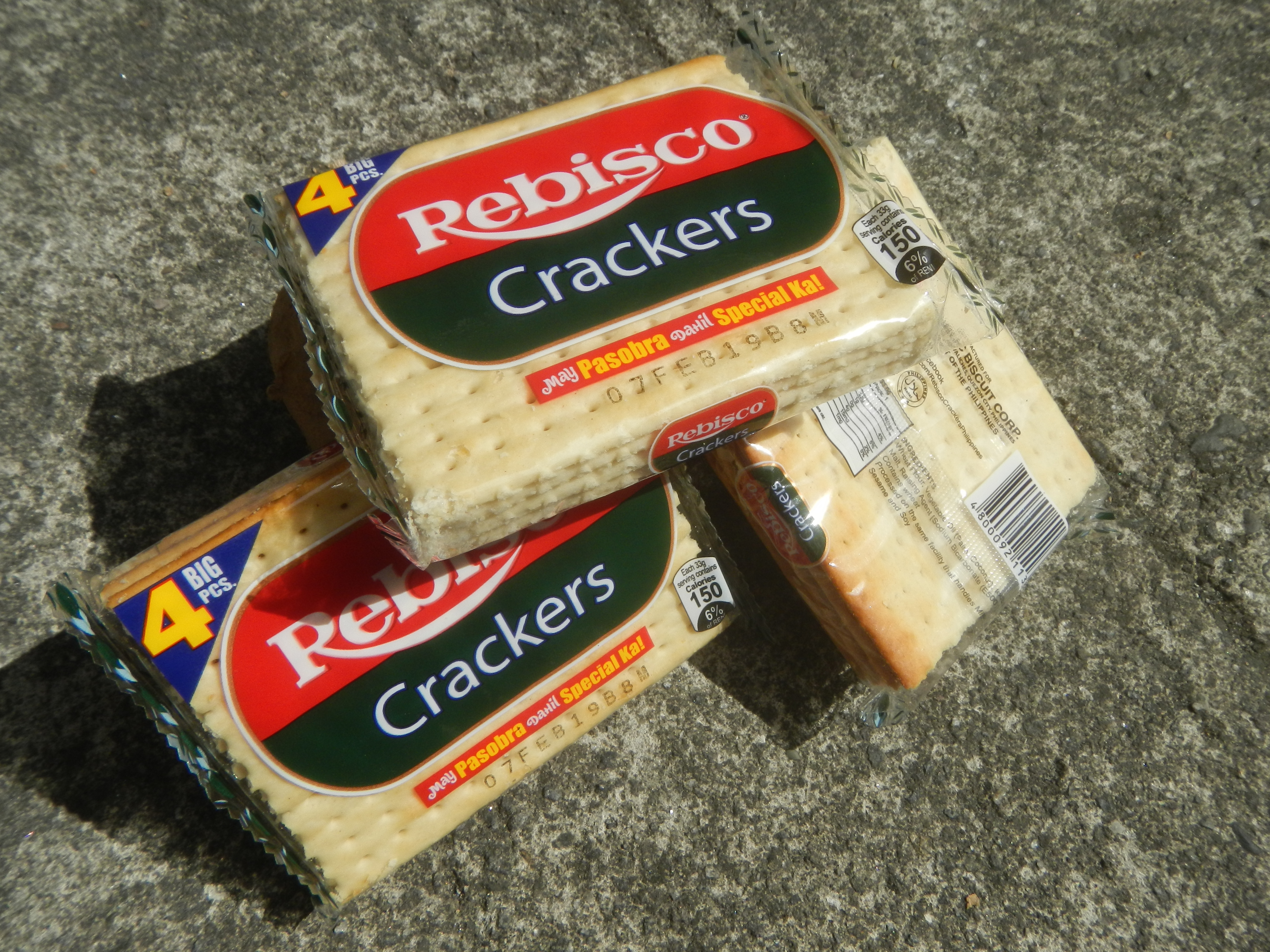
Rebisco crackers

The company's products include biscuits, crackers, cookies, wafers, cakes, donuts, breads, candies, lollipops, chewing gums, jellies, chips, chocolates, creampastes, nuts, peas, seeds, ice cream, energy drinks, beverages, cooking oils, flours and baking mixes. All of their products are available in the Philippines and other parts of the world.

== Operations ==
Since 2009, Rebisco has been headquartered at the 38th floor of the Joy-Nostalg Center, which is located in No. 17 ADB Avenue, Ortigas Center, Pasig, Metro Manila. In addition, it also has eight factories in Asia, including Quezon City, Caloocan, Valenzuela, Marilao (Bulacan), Calamba (Laguna), Clark (Pampanga), Tanza (Cavite), and Ho Chi Minh City (Vietnam). As of 2023, the company has a presence in 48 countries across Asia, Africa, Europe, the Middle East, Oceania and the Americas.

== Subsidiaries ==
- Rebisco Group of Companies/Republic Biscuit Corporation (parent corporate entity)
  - Republic Biscuit Corporation (division)
  - JBC Food Corporation
  - Suncrest Foods Inc.
  - Multirich Foods Corporation
  - SPI Corporation
  - Agripacific Corporation
  - SFI Multimix Corporation
  - Asia United Bank Corporation
  - Omnipack Industrial Corporation
  - SFI Fresh Bakers Corporation
  - RBC Best Baker Foods Inc.
  - Rebisco Foundation Inc.
  - Rebisco Vietnam Ltd.
  - Action Republic Corporation
  - RBC Retail Stores Corporation

=== Former subsidiary ===
- Pinnacle Foods Inc.
- Nutritive Snack Food Corporation
- Stateline Snack Food Corporation

== Sports teams ==
- Choco Mucho Flying Titans (Premier Volleyball League)
- Creamline Cool Smashers (Premier Volleyball League)
- Criss Cross King Crunchers (Spikers' Turf)
- Rebisco-PSL Manila (2017 Asian Women's Club Volleyball Championship)
- Rebisco Volleyball League National Championship

== Other developments ==
On February 21, 2011, Y&R Philippines won the branding work for Rebisco. Y&R was tasked to create a new global brand for Rebisco. It will include the creation of a new logo and packaging unified mark to strongly identify the vast array of products.
