= Robinsons Galleria =

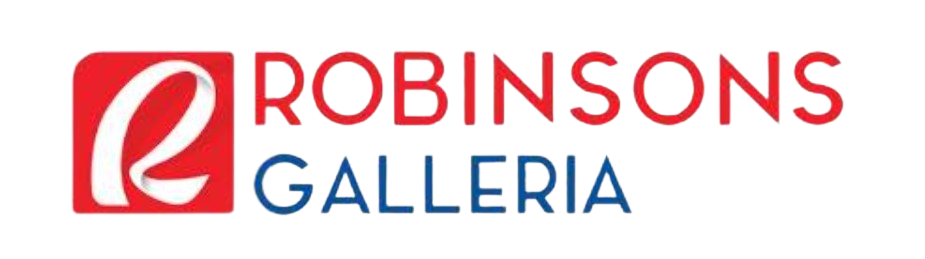

- Robinsons Galleria in 2024
- Location: Ugong Norte, Quezon City
- Coordinates: 14°35′27″N 121°3′34″E
- Address: EDSA (C-4) corner Ortigas Avenue, Ortigas Center
- Opened: January 12, 1990; 36 years ago
- Developer: Robinsons Land
- Manager: Robinsons Malls
- Owner: John Gokongwei
- Num. of stores: Over 500 shops and restaurants
- Num. of anchor tenants: 10
- Floor area: 221,000 m^{2} (2,380,000 ft^{2})
- Floors: 5
- Parking: 1000 cars
- Public transit: Ortigas; 1 Ortigas; 2 Robinsons Galleria; 3 Robinsons Galleria
- Website: robinsonsmalls.com/mall-info/robinsons-galleria-ortigas

Robinsons Galleria (also known as Robinsons Galleria Ortigas) is a mixed-use complex and shopping mall located at EDSA (C-4) corner Ortigas Avenue in Quezon City, Metro Manila, Philippines. It is the flagship mall of Robinsons Malls and is the first to bear the Galleria branding. It was opened on January 12, 1990, with a total gross floor area of approximately 221,000 square meters (2,380,000 ft^{2}).

== The mall ==
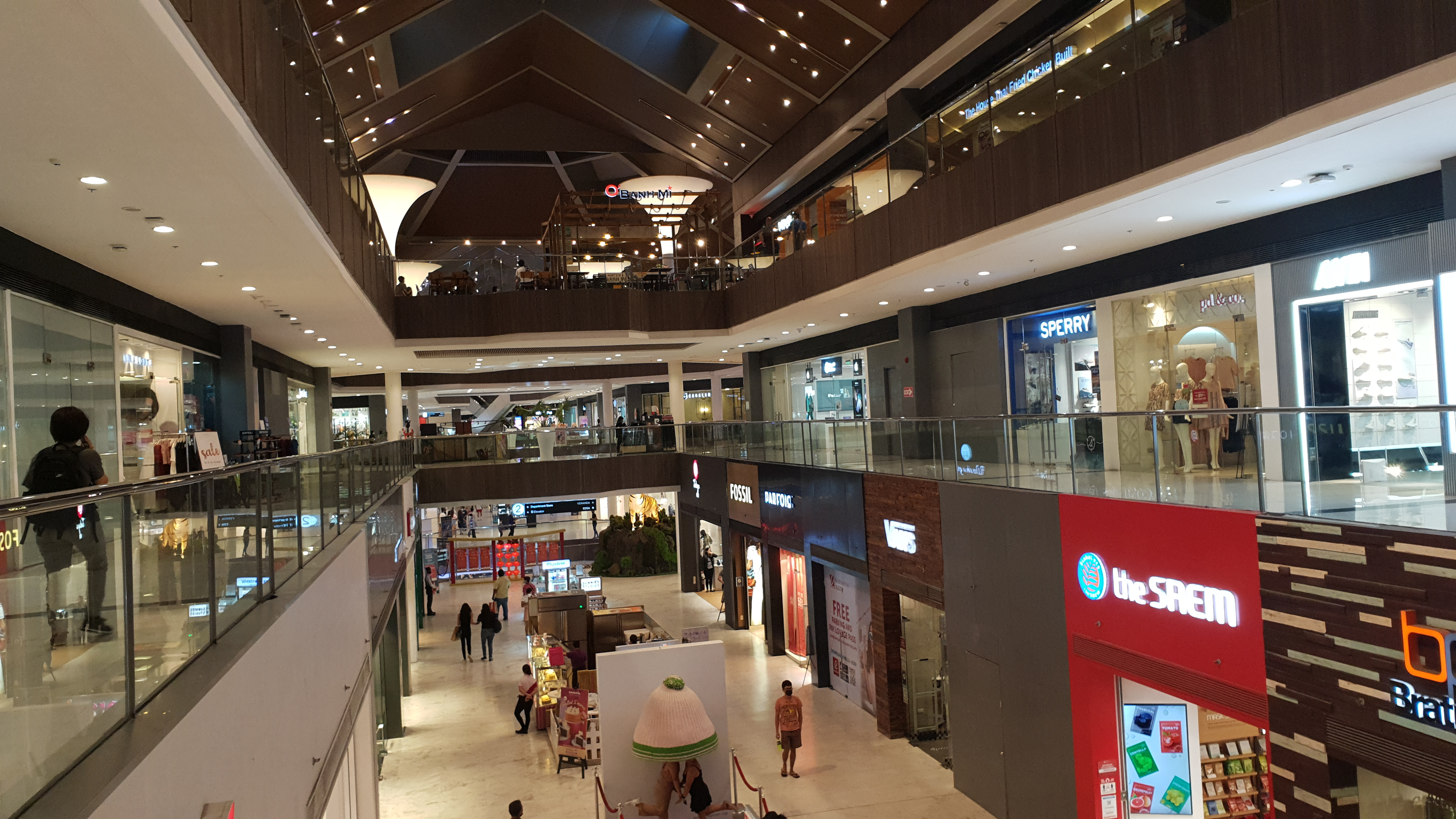
The atrium area of the mall, photographed from the second level.

Robinsons Galleria is a 5-level shopping mall and a landmark along EDSA and Ortigas Avenue, with more than 400 shops, dining outlets, entertainment facilities, and service centers. It is located within a mixed-use complex comprising two high-rise office towers: the Galleria Corporate Center and Robinsons Equitable Tower, two hotels: the Holiday Inn & Suites Manila Galleria, the Crowne Plaza Manila Galleria, and one serviced apartment: the Galleria Regency, which is located within the Crowne Plaza Manila Galleria.

One of the major mall tenants is the central passport office of the Department of Foreign Affairs in Metro Manila called DFA Consular Office NCR-Central, located on the first floor of the Lingkod Pinoy Center and inaugurated in September 2012.

== History ==
Robinsons Galleria in 2008

The mall's location was once open land owned by the SSS in the Ortigas Central Business District (now Ortigas Center). In February 1986, the portion of the land facing EDSA was where participants in the People Power Revolution also protested; tanks going north to Camp Aguinaldo and Camp Crame were stopped at this spot. In 1987, John Gokongwei bought a large portion of the land from the SSS, while the Archdiocese of Manila had partly purchased a plot near the intersection. It is the site of EDSA Shrine, a functioning national shrine which remains property of the Archdiocese.

Construction began in mid-1988 and finished in late 1989. The mall opened in 1990, being the first mall of Robinsons Malls. Since its opening, several renovations have been made to the mall, expanding its area to 216,000 square meters.

=== Incidents ===
- On March 29, 2012, one security guard was killed and six others wounded after two armed robbers lobbed a couple of grenades while fleeing with their loot. The Philippine National Police spokesman, Chief Superintendent Agrimero Cruz Jr., said that by 10:15 a.m. PHT, two unidentified suspects in disguise as guards attacked two bank guards who were escorting bank tellers and were supposed to deliver an undetermined amount of money in a money changer shop at the mall's ground floor.
- On October 29, 2013, a fire broke out inside the department store's toy section at around 11:00 p.m., when the employees, decorating Christmas lights inside the mall, rushed outside to flee the premises. Guests from the Holiday Inn evacuated and moved to the adjacent Crowne Plaza Hotel. The fire raged for about six hours and was under control the following morning, and the mall was closed until noon on November 1, 2013.

=== Urban legends ===
In the 1990s, an urban legend circulated claiming that a half-snake, half-human creature lived in the basement of the mall. The story alleged that the creature was the twin sibling of Robina Gokongwei (then-president and COO of Robinsons Retail), and that it watched potential victims from the fitting rooms of the mall's department store. According to the rumor, the creature would abduct selected women and was kept by the Gokongwei family as a supposed lucky charm. Among its supposed victims were actresses Alice Dixson and Rita Avila. Although the rumor is widely regarded as an urban myth, it gained Internet popularity in 2010 after a YouTube video claiming to depict the creature had circulated online.

In 2008, Gokongwei denied the legend as fake and asserted that the tale emerged from the "market competition". One of the alleged victims, Dixson, also dismissed the entire narrative as fake. In 2018, she would later appear in a Robinsons Galleria video advertisement lampooning the urban legend and in 2020, made a YouTube video wishing to put the rumors to rest.

In January 2025, ahead of Chinese New Year (during the Year of the Snake), Gokongwei poked fun at the urban legend in a Facebook post featuring herself posing with snake decorations at a Robinsons mall. In March 2026, Gokongwei made an appearance at the Robinsons Trade Partners Night with a Medusa-inspired headdress.

== Redevelopment ==
The mall has undergone several renovations since it opened in 1990. In 2012, the mall underwent a major facelift, adding an additional GLA of around 100,000 square meters to accommodate at least 50 tenants. The said developments expanded the mall's GLA to 216,000 square meters.

The latest redevelopment started in 2016. and will be done in 2 phases. The first renovation phase was from May to October 2016, while the second phase was to begin in May 2017. Aside from major renovations within the mall, the veranda will host more health and beauty service stores. There will be an upper veranda on the 3^{rd} floor, formerly the sports loop, to accommodate more dining options. The mall's renovation is almost complete.

The mall's renovation added wooden elements, a design similar to Robinsons Galleria Cebu.

== Transportation links ==
The mall, being at the corner of two busy thoroughfares, is considered a major transport hub for commuters going between Metro Manila and Rizal, with five distinct public transport terminals serving jeepney routes, bus routes, UV Express routes, and Premium Point-to-Point (P2P) bus routes.

- Carpark Annex Terminal: Near the EDSA Shrine and along EDSA. Serves UV Express routes to and from Pasig and Cainta.
- EDSA Terminal: Near the EDSA Shrine and along EDSA. Serves P2P bus routes to and from Makati and Alabang and the UBE Express P2P Bus to Ninoy Aquino International Airport.
- Ortigas Terminal: Along Ortigas Avenue. Serves P2P bus routes to and from Lipa and Batangas City, as well as jeepney routes to and from San Juan and Quezon City and bus routes to and from San Juan, Quezon City, Taytay, Angono, and Quiapo.
- Veranda Terminal: Near Crowne Plaza Manila Galleria and along Ortigas Avenue. Serves UV Express routes to and from Pasig proper, Marikina proper, Concepcion, Antipolo, Angono, Binangonan, and Cardona.
- ADB Terminal: Near Holiday Inn and along ADB Avenue. Serves UV Express routes around the Ortigas Center.

Starting September 10, 2026, the mall will also be served by the electric Love Bus service's Robinsons Galleria - Eastwood route.

The mall is also near Ortigas station of the MRT Line 3 and the Ortigas stop of the EDSA Carousel, which both run along EDSA. The future EDSA station of the MRT Line 4 will be located near the intersection of EDSA and Ortigas within the mall's vicinity.
