= Galleria Corporate Center =

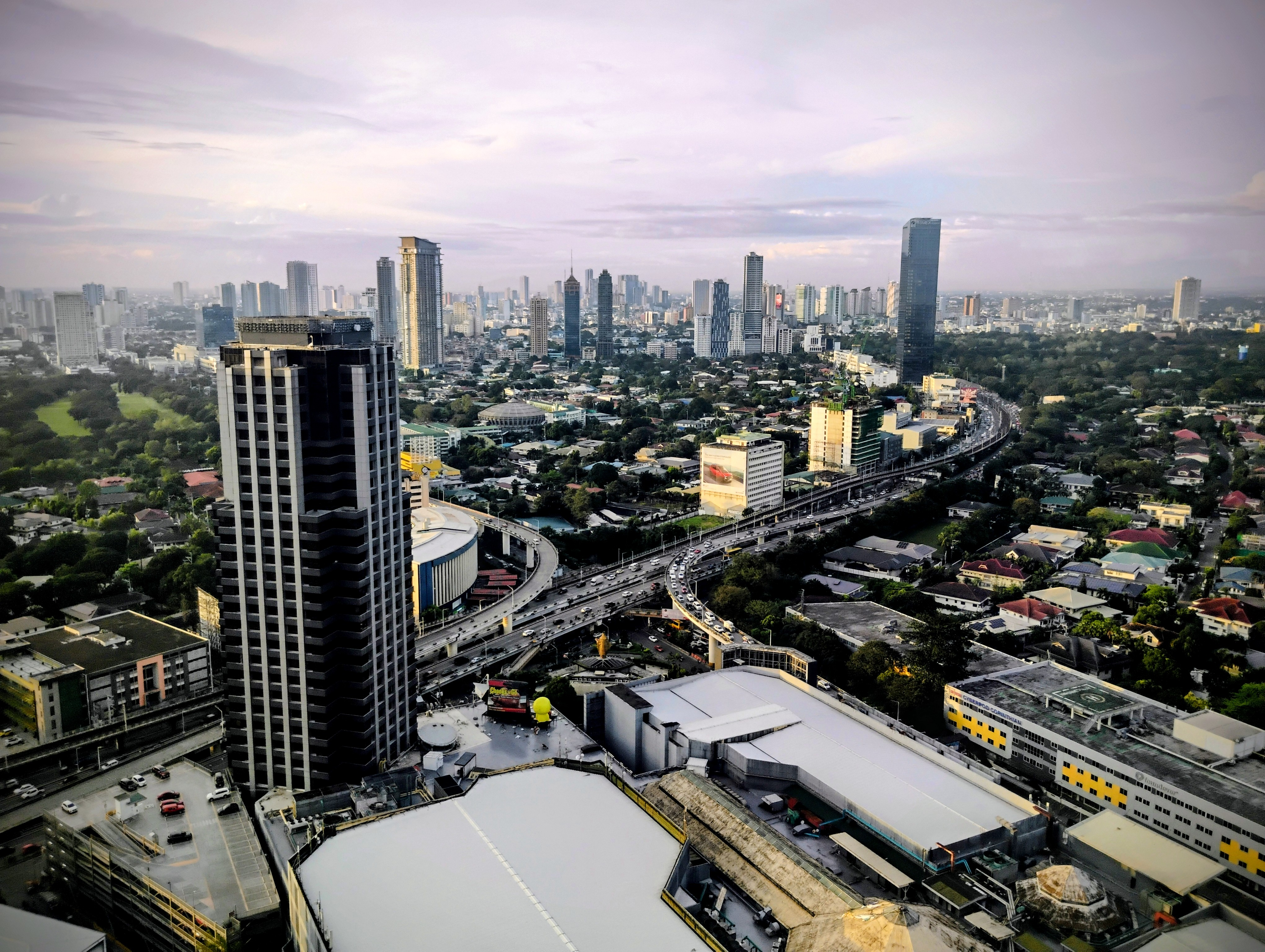
- The Galleria Corporate Center (left) with a view of the Ortigas Interchange and the areas of Barangay Greenhills and Quezon City in the background

General information
- Architectural style: Modern architecture
- Location: EDSA corner Ortigas Avenue, Ortigas Center, Quezon City, Philippines
- Coordinates: 14.5913°N 121.0584°E
- Opening: 1991

Height
- Height: 109.85 m (360.4 ft)

Technical details
- Floor count: 29
- Floor area: 25,000 m^{2} (269,097.76 sq ft) (GFA)
- Lifts/elevators: 6

Design and construction
- Developer: Robinsons Land

The Galleria Corporate Center is a 29-storey high-rise office building located in Ortigas Center, in Quezon City. Situated within the Robinsons Galleria complex, the building was opened in 1991 and is directly connected to the adjacent Robinsons Galleria mall. The building is also located within close proximity to key transport terminals, such as UV terminals within the Robinsons Galleria mall, the Ortigas Avenue jeepney stop, the Ortigas station of the MRT 3 and the Ortigas Bus Stop of the EDSA Carousel.

== History ==
The building's location sits on a land formerly owned by the SSS in the Ortigas Central Business District, now known as the Ortigas Center. The land was eventually purchased by John Gokongwei in 1987 and later shared a portion of the land with the Archdiocese of Manila, which later became the site of the EDSA Shrine after its completion in 1989. The building was eventually completed in 1991, roughly a year after the completion of the Robinsons Galleria mall in 1990.

== Architecture ==
The building rises at a height of 109.85 m (360.4 ft) and features designs infused in modern architecture styles, which was eventually patterned to blend and complement the adjacent Robinsons Galleria mall. The building also features two sets of setbacks from the 22nd to 26th floor and the 27th to 29th floor. The tower's exteriors were eventually modernized in 2019 and currently features a mixture of gray and white color cladding patterns. The building also has a LED screen installed on the facade of the tower facing the southbound view of the Ortigas Interchange, and has a dimension of 137.8 ft in height and 73.5 ft in width.

== Tenants ==
The building has a total gross floor area (GFA) of 25,000 m^{2} (269,097.76 sq ft) and is home to various local and international companies. The building was once occupied by subsidiary companies under JG Summit Holdings before the completion of the nearby Robinsons Equitable Tower in 1997. Other former tenants include Digitel and Robinsons Bank before the bank was acquired by the Bank of the Philippine Islands (BPI) in 2024. The present tenants of the building include Robinsons Land Corporation and its subsidiary real estate company Robinsons Malls; Mercan Canada Employment Philippines, Inc. at the 5th floor, Cathay Land, Inc. at the 8th floor, Villaruz, Villaruz & Co., CPAs at the 9th floor, Forever Rich Philippines Inc. at the 15th floor, and both the Hi-Cool Engineering Corporation and the Goldland Properties and Development Corp. at the 19th floor.
