= Happy Plugs =

Swedish company that designs smartphones accessories founded in 2011

Happy Plugs AB
- Trade name: Happy Plugs
- Type: Private
- Industry: Audio, Consumer electronics
- Founded: 2011
- Founder: Andreas Vural
- Headquarters: Kungsbacka, Sweden
- Key people: Stefan Eriksson (CEO, Board member)
- Website: happyplugs.com

Happy Plugs is a Swedish consumer electronics company founded by Andreas Vural in 2011. The company initially became known for its colorful corded headphones before expanding into mobile phone cases, speakers, and other accessories. It now primarily focuses on audio products, including wired headphones, true wireless earbuds, and over-ear headphones.

== History ==
Founder Andreas Vural created the headphones after being inspired by his girlfriend who wondered why ”most headphones only came in black and white” [sic]. When presenting the idea for friends and acquaintances, he was met with only skepticism. They questioned how he would be able to compete against established actors like Sony and Philips, leaving Vural with second thoughts. He decided to move on and commissioned a plastic manufacturer to design the packaging where the headphones are arranged in the shape of a note. Taking a pair of white iPhone headphones and spray painting them, he went on the road to sell "his product".

In August 2011, he found a distributor in Helsingborg that wished to order 25,000 of them. With no company, no actual product and no knowledge of how to produce the product, Vural was caught off guard. Despite this, he promised to deliver the headphones in time for the holiday season. Vural arranged to have them manufactured in China. On December 14, Vural delivered the first Happy Plugs to electronics retailer Siba.

In 2016 Happy Plugs stated that the products was available in over 70 countries and with over 10 million customers served worldwide.

In December 2022 it was announced that Tura Scandinavia AB. Happy Plugs Swedish distributor had acquired Happy Plugs AB. The takeover date was set for January 2. 2023.

=== Collaborations ===
Happy Plugs has collaborated with a range of fashion brands, artists, retailers, and organizations on limited-edition products and design projects. Notable collaborations include partnerships with Smiley®, Saint Laurent, Weekday, H&M, and the Paris concept store Colette. The company has also released special collaborations with the band 30 Seconds to Mars, the World Childhood Foundation, MTV, and the retailer Urban Outfitters.

=== Awards ===
In 2013, Happy Plugs was nominated for the Swedish fashion award "Guldknappen", "the Golden Button" in the accessories category. In 2014, Happy Plugs won a Silver Pentaward for their heart shaped cable packaging.
