= Crowne Plaza Manila Galleria =

- Interactive map of the Crowne Plaza Manila Galleria area

General information
- Status: Completed
- Type: Hotel
- Location: Ortigas Avenue corner ADB Avenue, Ortigas Center, Quezon City, Philippines
- Coordinates: 14.5912°N 121.0612°E
- Opening: December 5, 2005; 20 years ago
- Operator: Crowne Plaza

Technical details
- Floor count: 19
- Lifts/elevators: 3

Other information
- Number of rooms: 263

Crowne Plaza Manila Galleria is a hotel located at the Ortigas Center in Quezon City, Philippines. Built in 2004, Crowne Plaza Manila Galleria is the first Crowne Plaza property in Manila. The hotel has 263 deluxe and suite rooms.

Crowne Plaza was the first hotel in the Philippines to roll out a mobile Internet solution for its Wi-Fi needs.

In 2011, Crowne Plaza undertook a refurbishment of its ballrooms. The renovation of events space marks the facility's first make-over since it opened its doors in 2005.

In 2018, the bicameral conference committee for the Bangsamoro Organic Law was held in the hotel.

In 2019, the Philippine Fashion Week was held in the hotel, with it becoming its permanent home for the next three years.
