= SIBA (retailer) =

Swedish retail company

SIBA AB
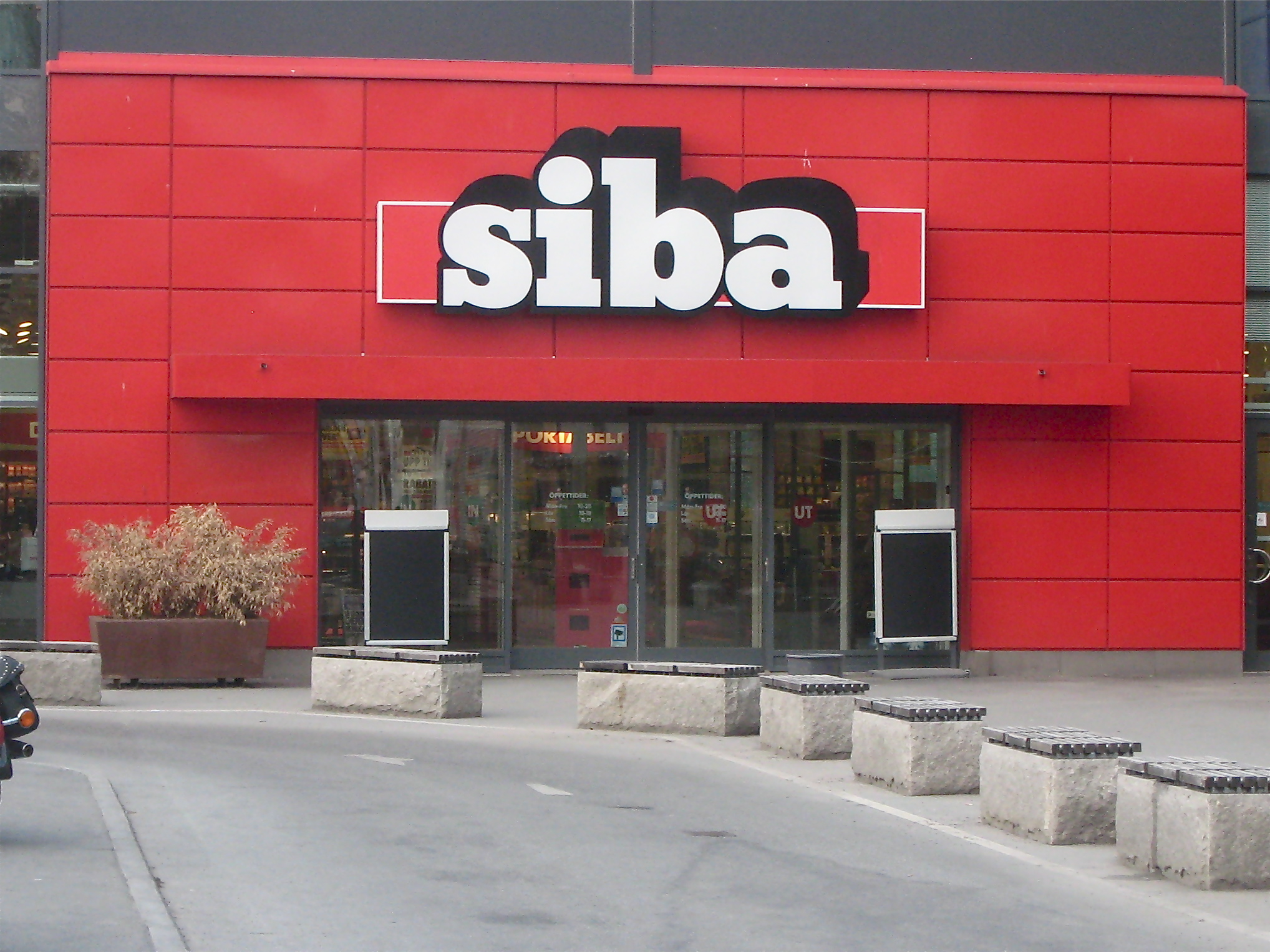
- Company type: Subsidiary
- Industry: Retail
- Founded: 1951; 75 years ago
- Founder: Folke Bengtsson
- Defunct: 2017
- Fate: All remaining locations rebranded as NetOnNet stores
- Headquarters: Gothenburg, Sweden
- Number of locations: 60 (2009)
- Area served: Sweden; Denmark; Norway
- Parent: Net On Net Group

SIBA AB (sometimes Siba or siba without capitalisation) was a large Swedish chain of home electronics retail stores. SIBA was headquartered in Gothenburg. In 2009, there were 60 stores in Sweden, Denmark and in Norway.

== History ==
SIBA started in 1951 at Herkulesgatan 7 on Hisingen. Net on Net Group (SIBA's partner company) announced they would integrate Siba into Netonnet. SIBA's official website now leads directly to NetOnNet's web shop, and all stores were either made into NetonNet stores or closed down.

=== 1950s ===
In 1951, there was only one radio station in operation, primarily offering radio readings, and music on the radio was uncommon. SIBA was established by Folke Bengtsson during this time. In addition to radios and radiogramophones, the company also sold chandeliers from their own production.

=== 1960s ===
In 1961, Folke Bengtsson's son, Bengt Bengtsson, took over the business and developed SIBA into a dedicated radio and television retail chain. The company expanded with the opening of new stores in Gothenburg.

=== 1970s ===
In 1974, SIBA opened Sweden's first department store for radio and television at Backaplan in Gothenburg. The store's slogan was "Lower rates – better service." The store attracted customers from both Sweden and Norway who came to purchase consumer electronics.

=== 1980s ===
SIBA expanded during the mid to late 80's with new stores being opened in western and southern Sweden. As one of the first consumer electronics chains, SIBA in 1989 included computers and telephony in its range of products.

=== 1990s ===
SIBA introduced its third business segment, Kitchen and Laundry, in 1994. In autumn 1997, the chain was acquired by Tandy's Computer City, which had stores in Sweden and Denmark. SIBA subsequently became the largest reseller of data and voice services to the consumer market.

The late 1990s marked a period of significant expansion for SIBA, with new stores opening nationwide, including several in the Stockholm area. The company's goal was to become the leading player in consumer electronics in the Nordic region.

=== 2000s ===
In the 2000s, SIBA continued its expansion in Sweden and Denmark. Additionally, SIBA opened its first store in Norway. Oslo's residents queued for several weeks to pick up a bargain home in the Group's first store, located in Furuseth.

=== 2010s ===
SIBA has consolidated its position as one of the leading Nordic chains for consumer electronics. In 2011, SIBA celebrated its 60th anniversary.

==== 2014 ====
Fabian Bengtsson concluded his tenure as CEO and continued to serve on the board of directors, eventually taking over the presidency from his father. He remained a prominent figure in the company's television commercials. The new CEO, Susanne Ehnbåge, began her career at SIBA as a business developer and subsequently advanced to roles including marketing manager and vice president.

==== 2017 ====
SIBA's parent company, Net On Net Group, announced in 2016 that the SIBA chain would be integrated into Net On Net. By 2017, all suitable stores had been converted, and any remaining SIBA stores had closed by the summer.
