= Joy-Nostalg Center =

Skyscrapers in Ortigas Center

Joy-Nostalg Center Manila
- Joy Nostalg Center as seen from ADB Avenue.

General information
- Status: Completed
- Type: Mixed-Use
- Location: No. 17 ADB Avenue, Ortigas Center, Pasig, Metro Manila, Philippines
- Construction started: December 2006
- Opening: September 9, 2009; 16 years ago
- Owner: Quantuvis Resources Corp.

Height
- Roof: 150 m (492.13 ft)

Technical details
- Floor count: 40 aboveground, 6 below ground
- Lifts/elevators: 13

Design and construction
- Architects: Esteban Y. Tan and Gavino L. Tan Partners; C.Y. Lee & Partners
- Developer: Quantuvis Resources Corp.
- Structural engineer: Aromin & Sy + Associates
- Main contractor: DATEM Construction

The Joy-Nostalg Center (styled Joy~Nostalg Center), is a mixed-use office and serviced apartment in Ortigas Center, Pasig, Philippines. It houses the headquarters of local and multinational companies while the five-star serviced apartment is operated by The Ascott Limited, formerly managed by Oakwood Premier and AccorHotels. The building is developed and owned by Quantuvis Resources Corporation.

== Architecture ==
Street-level view of the Joy-Nostalg Center in 2013, under its prior Oakwood branding

The Joy-Nostalg Center was conceptualized and master-planned by Architects Esteban Y. Tan and Gavino L. Tan Partners, while interior design specifics were designed conceptually by Lee Designs (the Interior Design firm of C.Y. Lee & Partners) and executed by Leandro V. Locsin & Partners with the hotel/serviced apartments guided by Oakwood Technical Group from Singapore. The façade and interior design concepts were made in collaboration with the Taiwan-based architectural group of C.Y. Lee & Partners, responsible for the concept behind the former tallest building in the world, the Taipei 101.

The Joy-Nostalg Center is a 40-storey mixed use building, with 16 floors of office space, 23 floors of apartment space, and 6 basement parking levels.

== Construction ==
The excavation works for the building started in December 2006, and structural works started by June 2007. The building was topped off on 20 November 2008, and was completed by the 3rd quarter of 2009. The building, together with its main tenant, the Oakwood Premier, had its soft launching on 1 August 2009, and was formally opened on 9 September 2009.

== See also ==
- List of tallest buildings in Metro Manila
