= Ortigas Center =

Central business district in Metro Manila, Philippines

Ortigas Center Ortigas Central Business District
- Central Business District
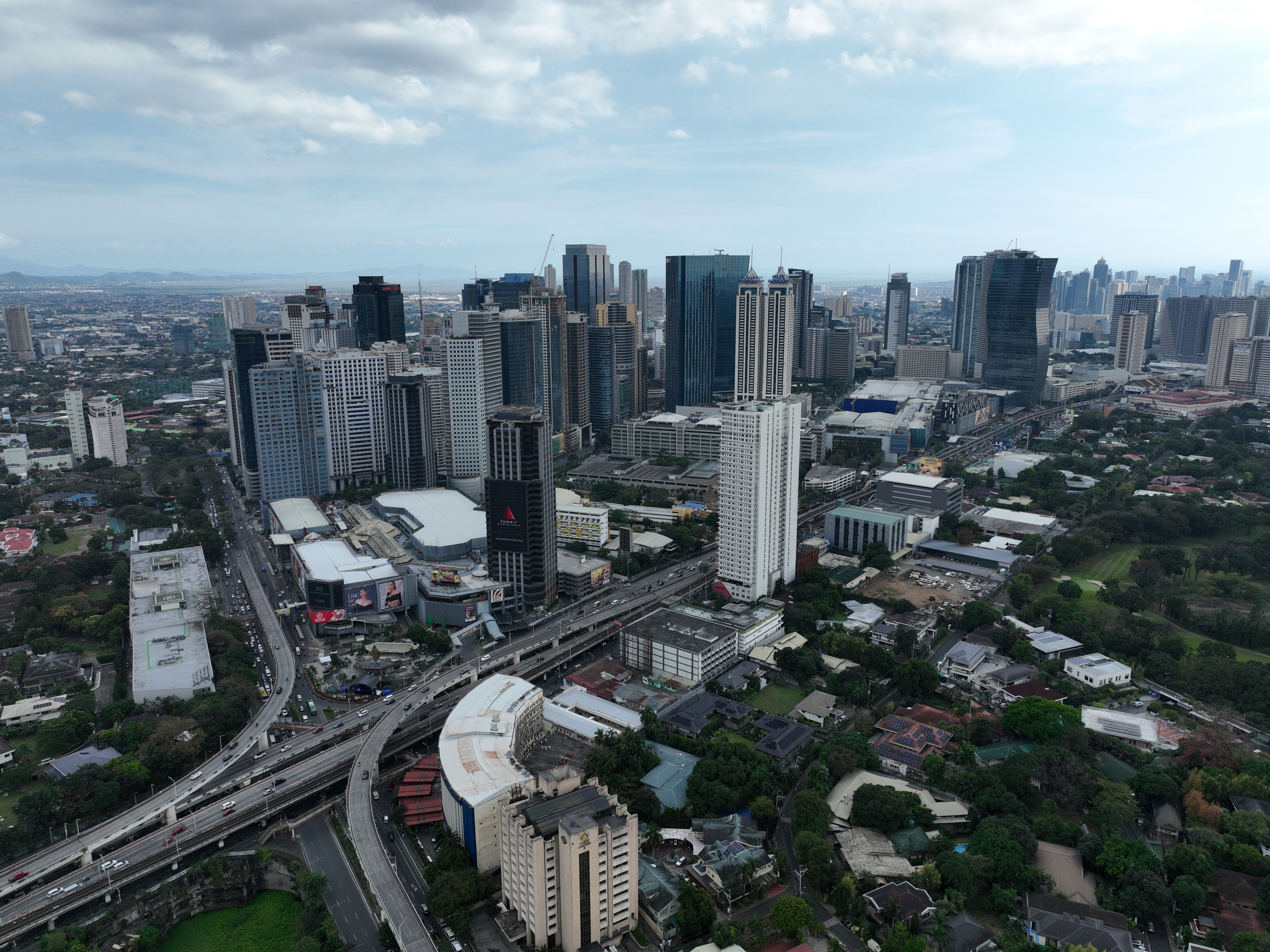
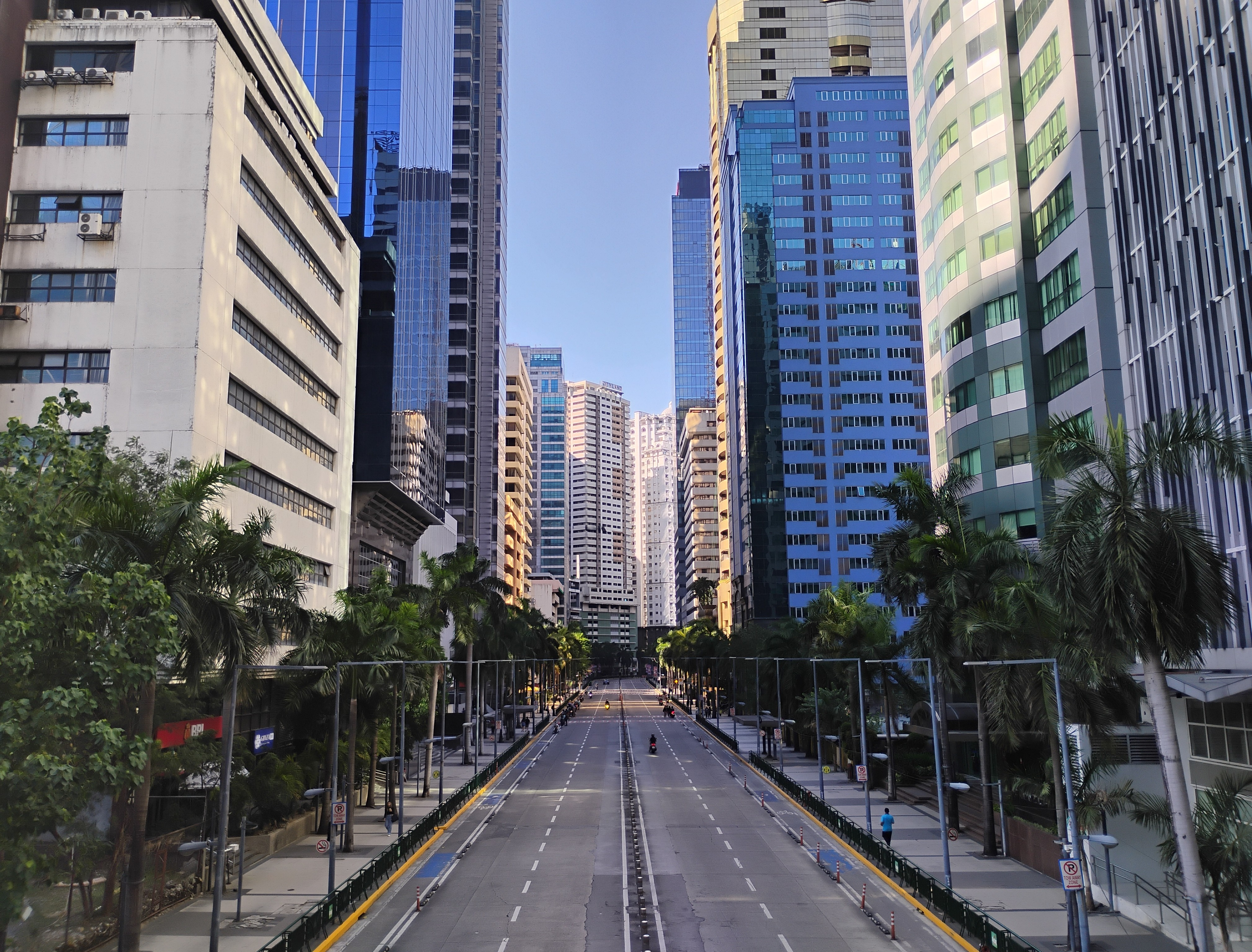
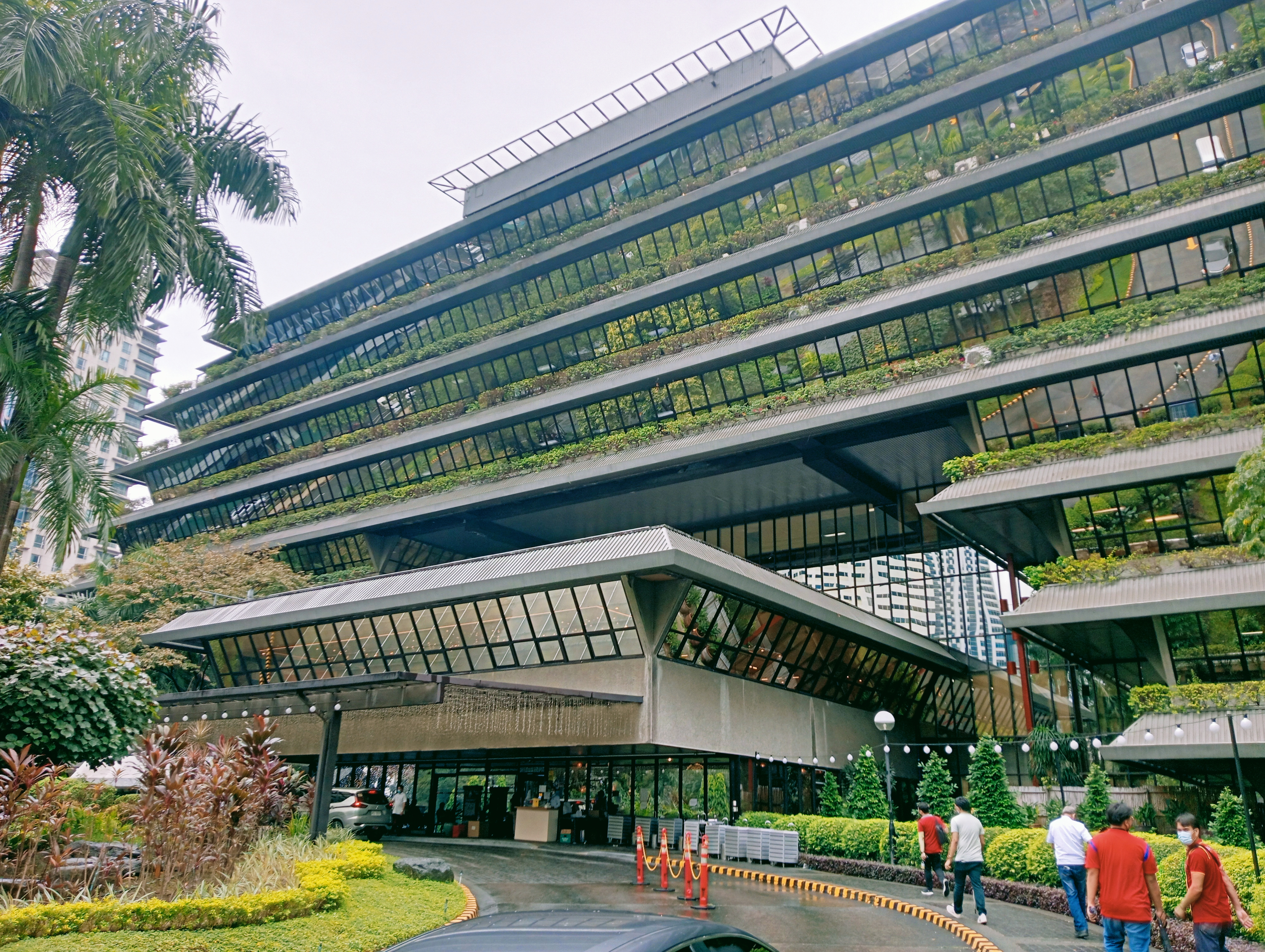
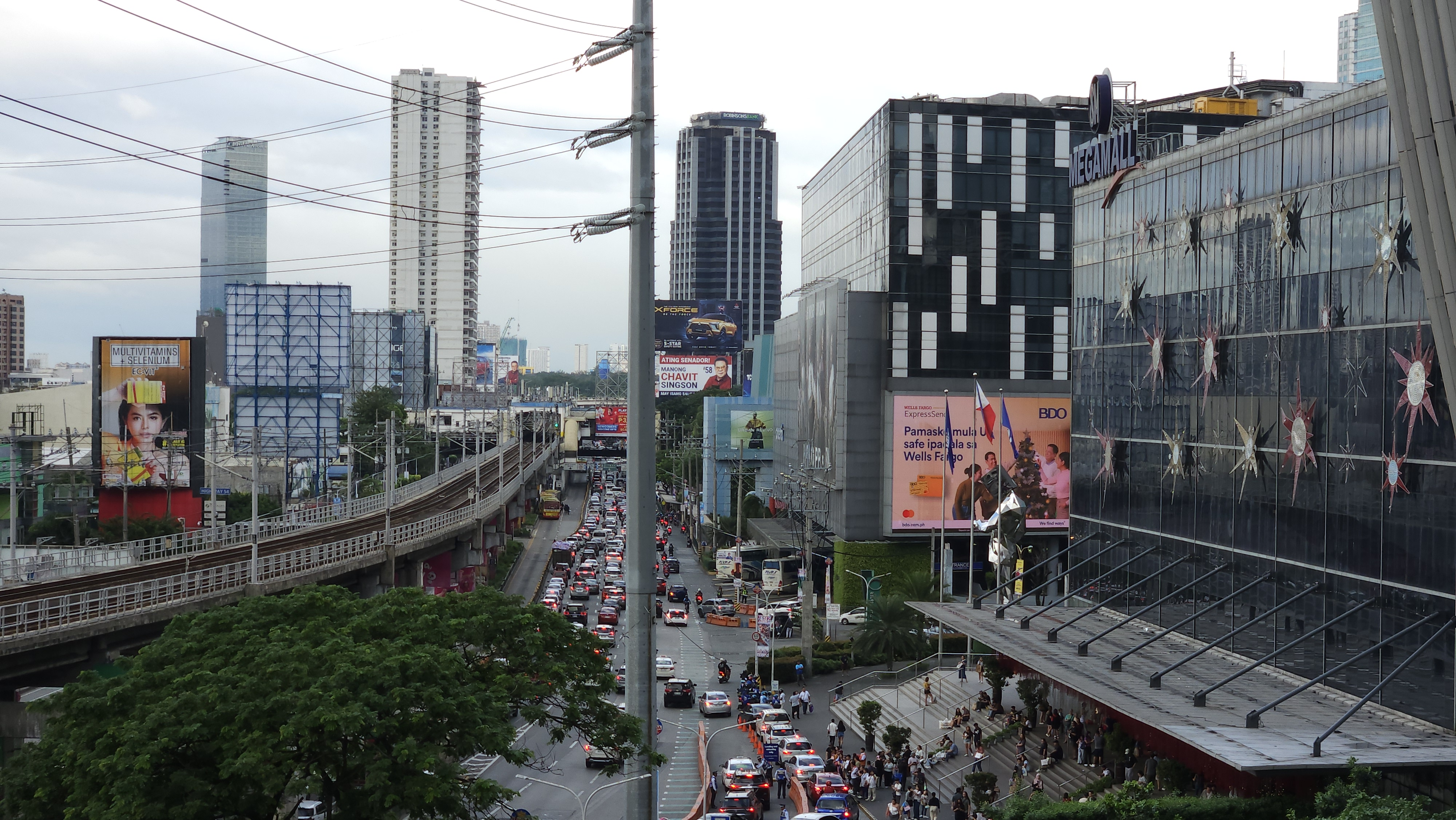
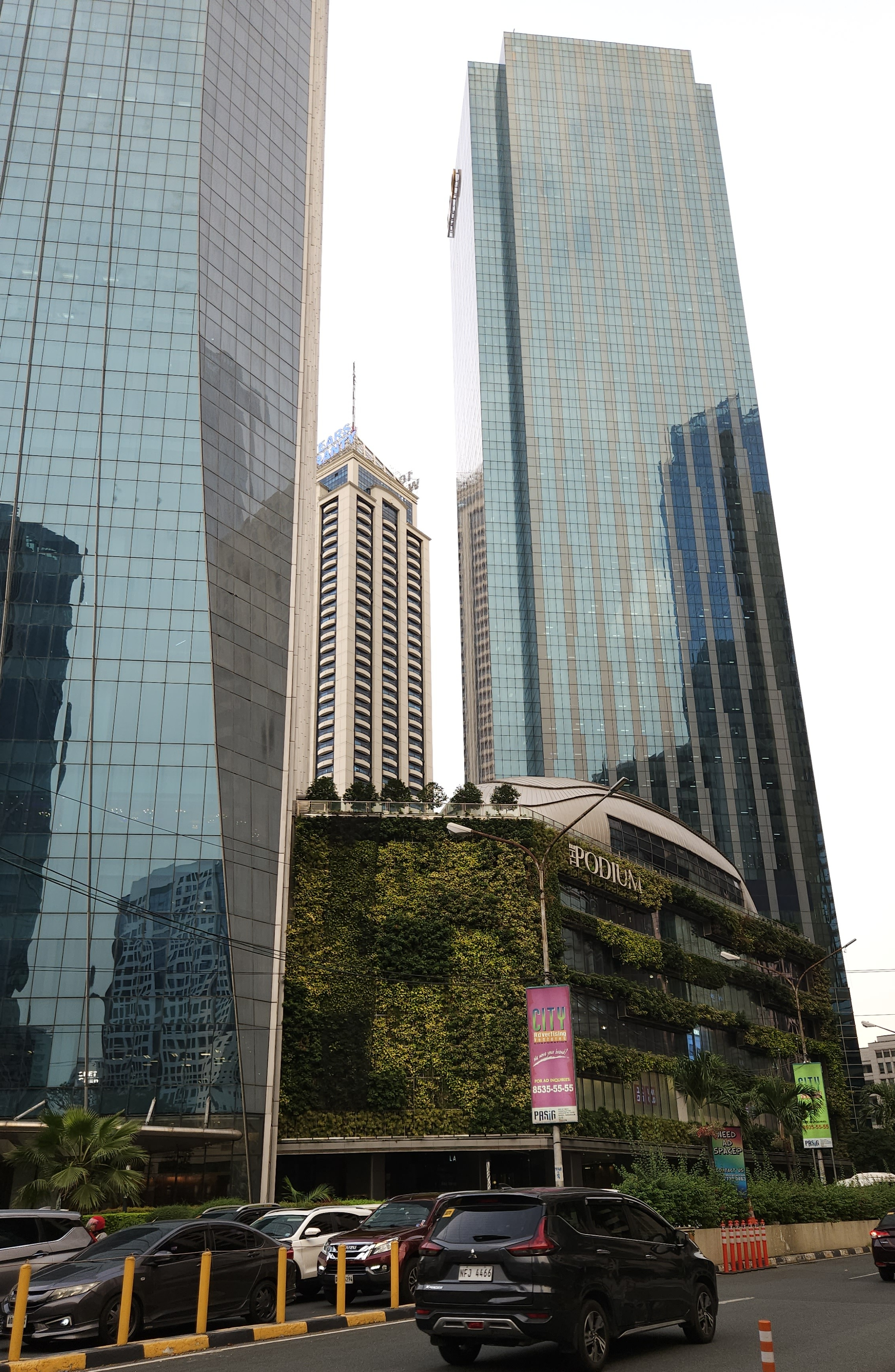
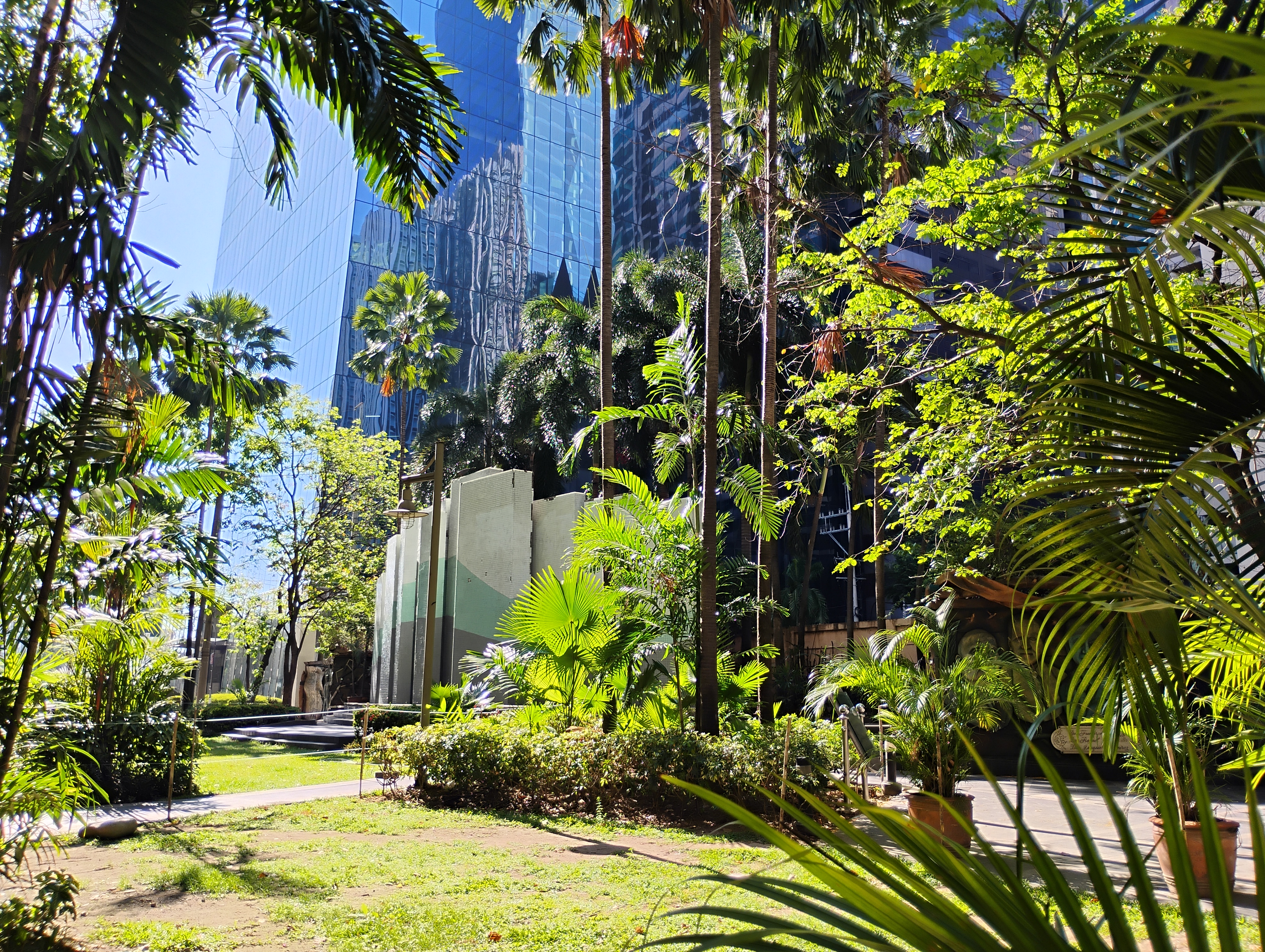
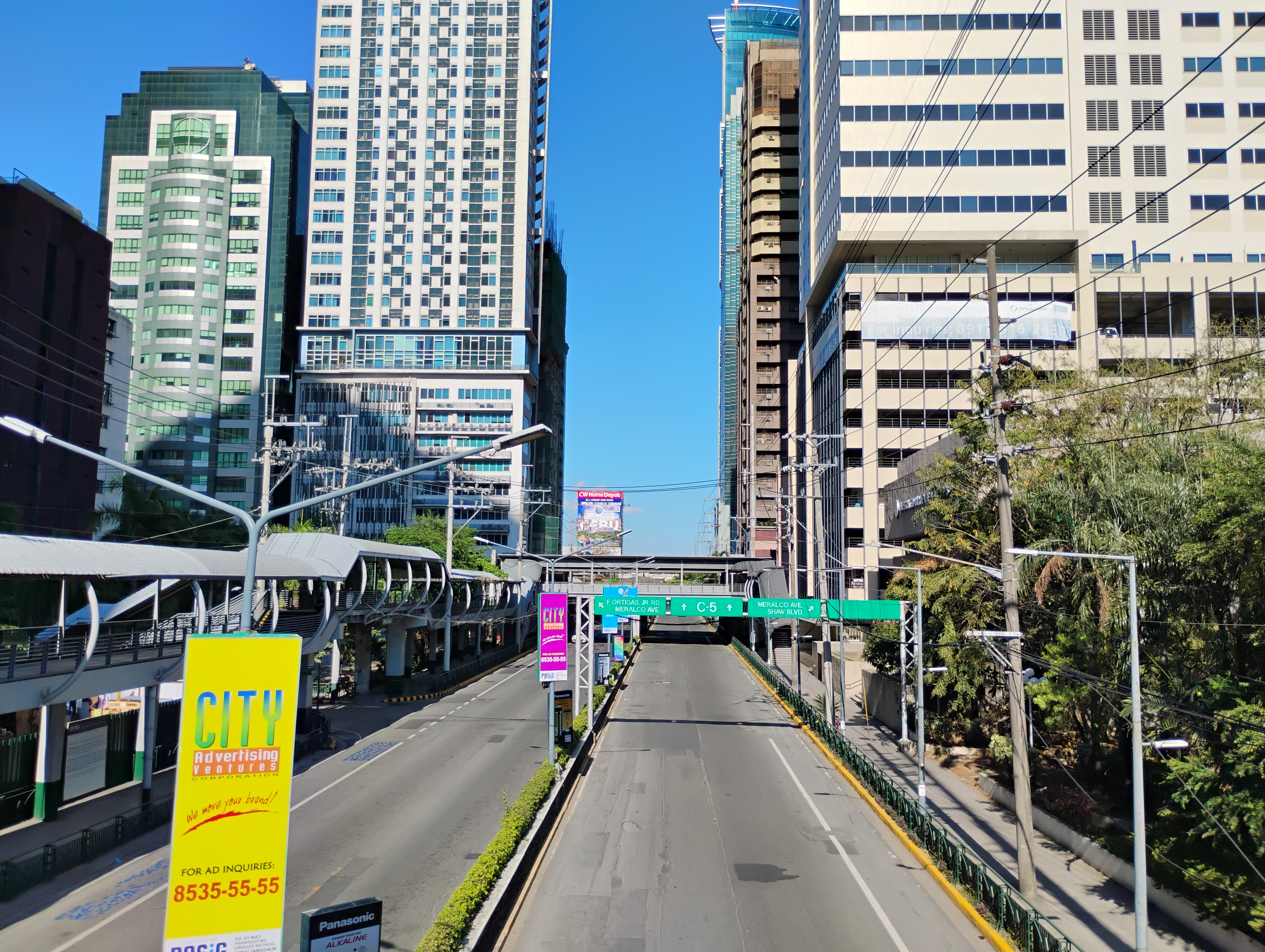
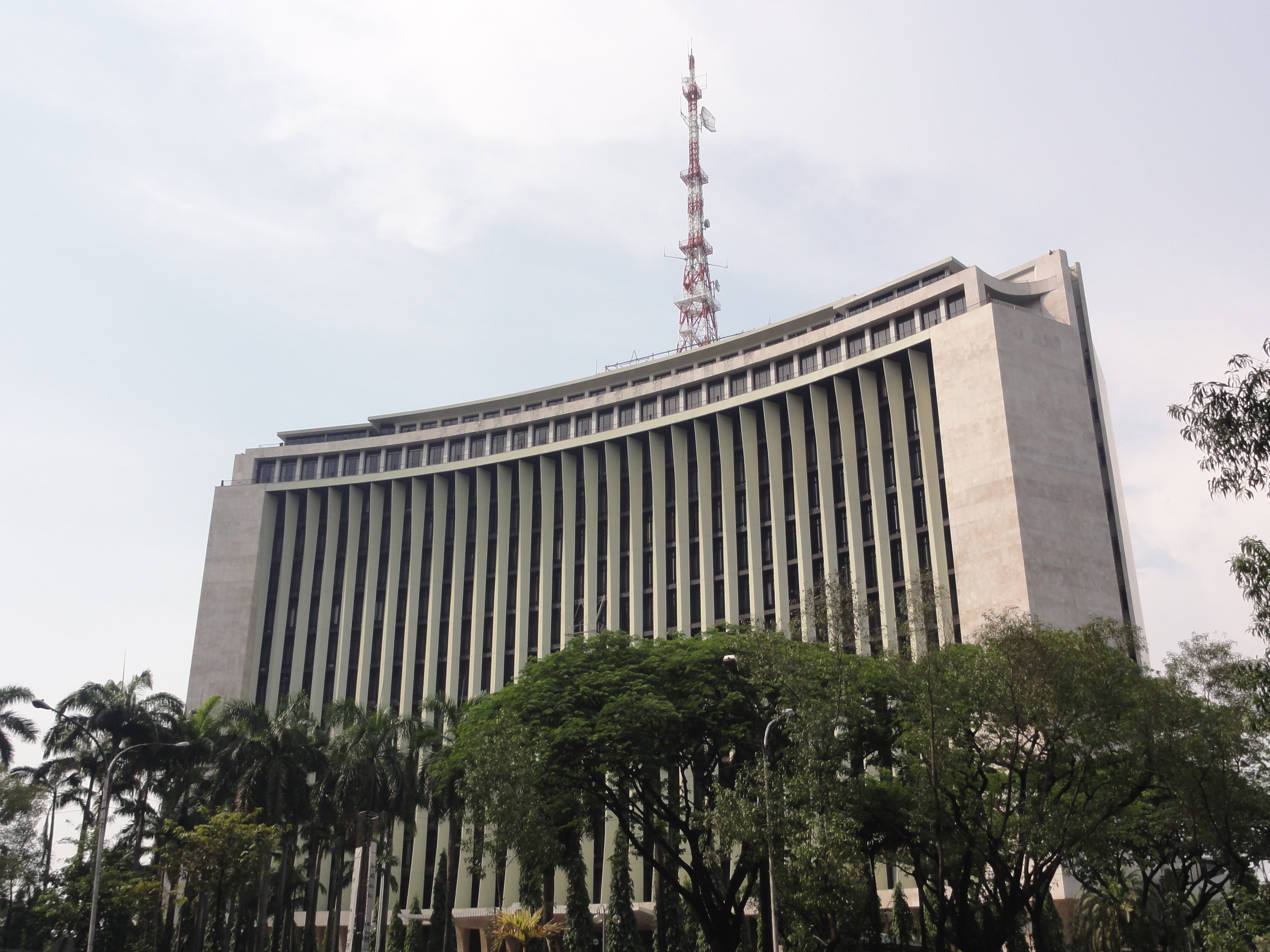
- Ortigas Skyline F. Ortigas Jr. Road San Miguel Headquarters SM Megamall The Podium Ortigas Park Julia Vargas Avenue EDSA Shrine and Robinsons Galleria Meralco Theater

- Location within Metro Manila
- Coordinates: 14°35′0″N 121°3′40″E
- Country: Philippines
- Region: National Capital Region
- Cities: Pasig, Mandaluyong, and Quezon City
- Established: July 10, 1931; 95 years ago

Area
  - Land: 1.01 km^{2} (0.39 sq mi)
- Elevation: 43.87 m (143.9 ft)
- Time zone: UTC+8 (PST)
- Area code: 2
- Website: ortigas.com.ph

Ortigas Center (also known as the Ortigas Central Business District or Ortigas CBD) is a central business district located within the joint boundaries of Pasig, Mandaluyong, and Quezon City, within Metro Manila in the Philippines. With an area of more than 100 hectares (250 acres), it is Metro Manila's second most important business district after the Makati Central Business District. It is governed by the Ortigas Center Association, Inc. (OCAI), a non-stock and non-profit organization established in 1982 by Ortigas Land to manage the development.

Ortigas Center is home to many shopping malls, office and condominium skyscrapers, nightlife bars, restaurants, and other building complexes. These include the St. Francis Square, the Asian Development Bank compound, the Oakwood Premier serviced apartments and a Shangri-La hotel. It is also home to the headquarters of San Miguel Corporation, Jollibee Foods Corporation, Viva Communications, Century Pacific Food and Rebisco, and secondary or alternate office of National Grid Corporation of the Philippines (NGCP) at Bonaventure Plaza. Also present in the area are Philippine offices of prominent engineering firms such as Parsons Brinckerhoff, Sinclair Knight Merz, and WSP Group.

It is also home to the Banco de Oro main office owned by mall tycoon Henry Sy, Sr., as is the SM Megamall he owns—one of the largest malls in the nation—along EDSA. Also located near the Ortigas Center is The Medical City, one of the three hospitals in the nation accredited by the Joint Commission on International Accreditation. Ortigas Center is surrounded by Ortigas Avenue to the north, EDSA to the west, Meralco Avenue to the east, and Shaw Boulevard to the south.

== History ==
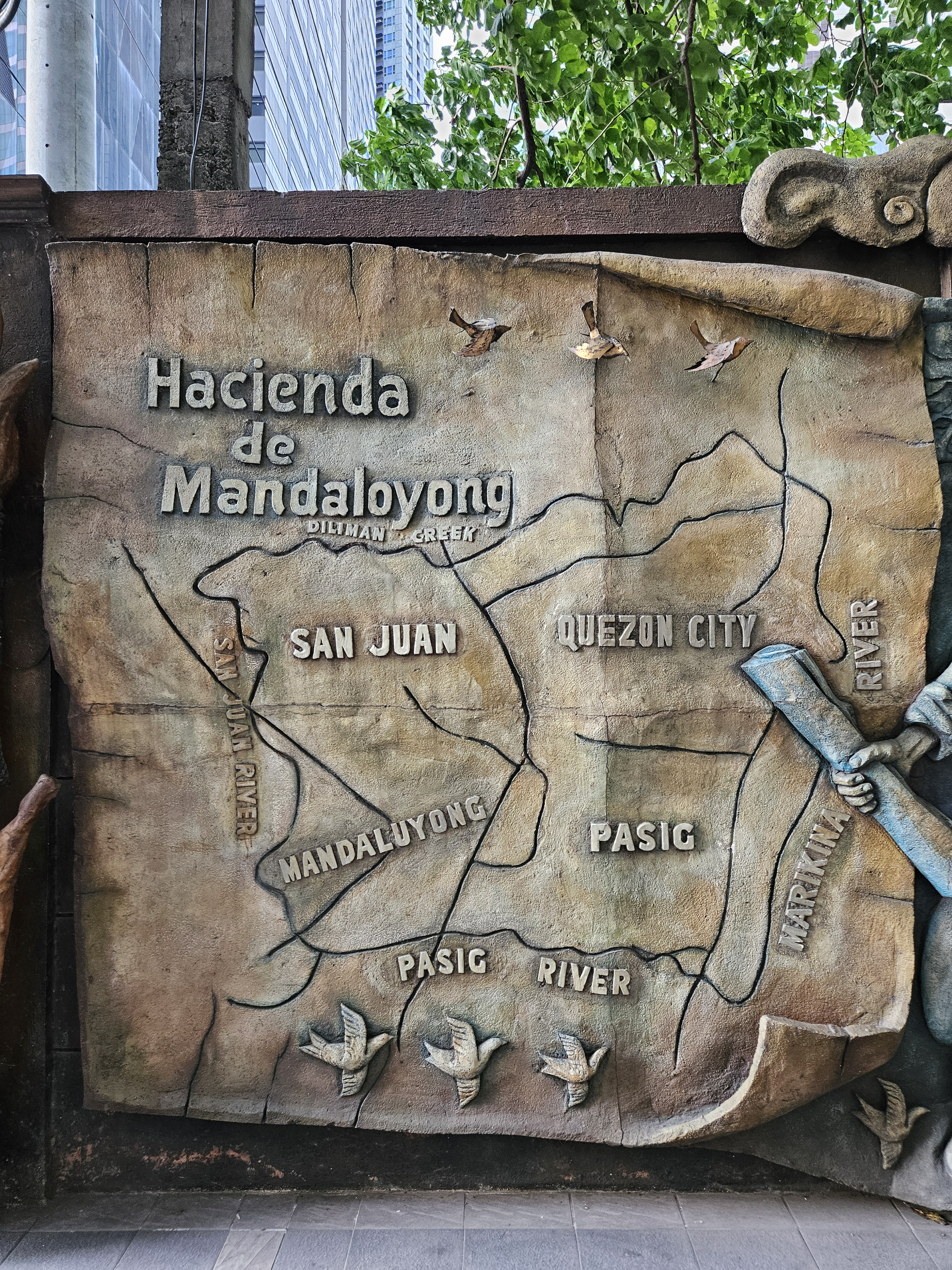
A map of the Hacienda de Mandaloyong depicted on the mural at Ortigas Park

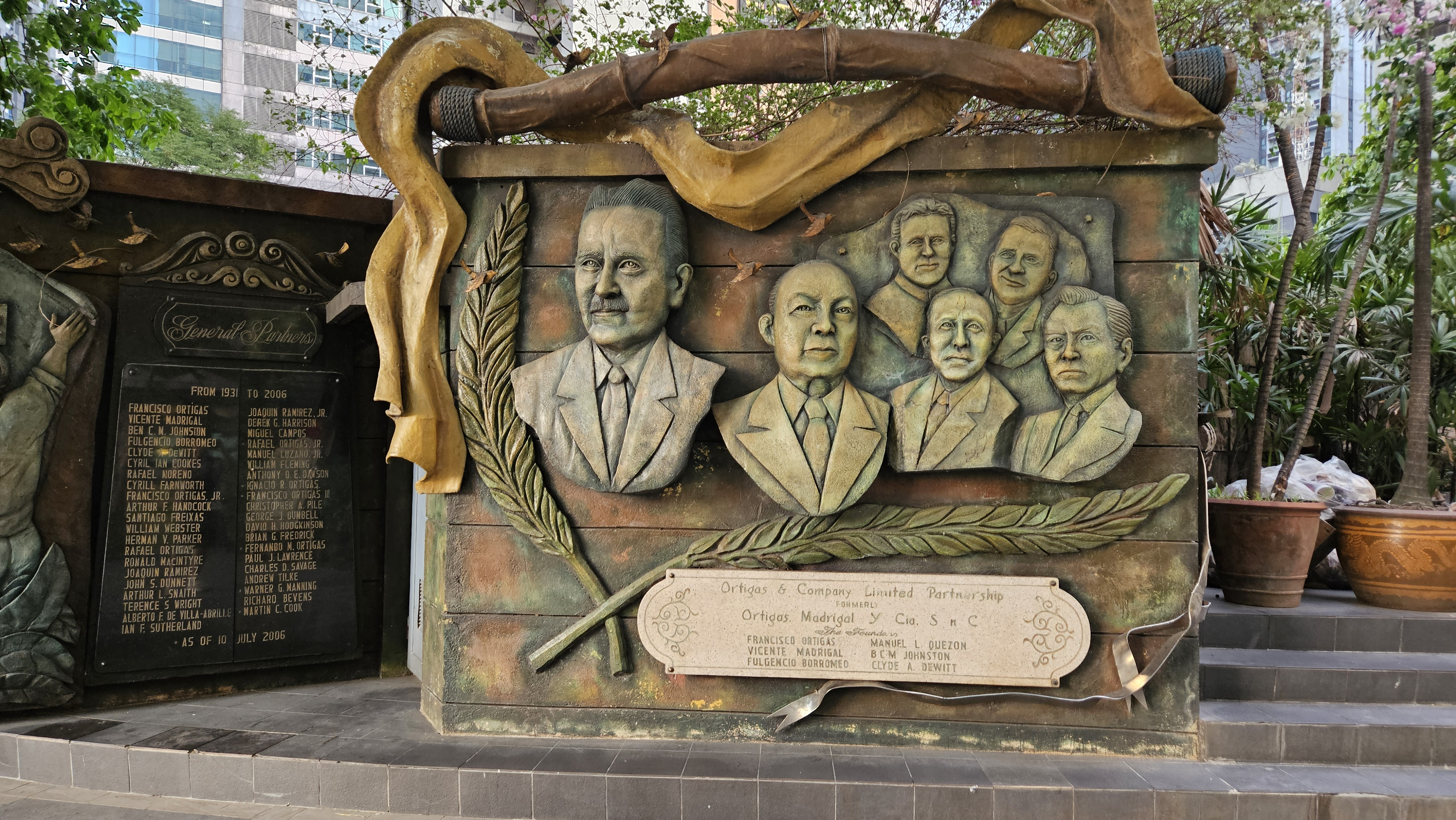
A mural at Ortigas Park with the founders and partners of Ortigas and Company

Ortigas Center began as the 4,033-hectare (9,970-acre) "Hacienda de Mandaloyon" (also known as "Mandaloyen," "Mandaloyong," or "Mandaloya"), an estate from the Augustinian Order that spanned the present-day cities of San Juan, Mandaluyong, Quezon City, and Pasig. On January 20, 1920, the Augustinian friars sold this property to Dr. Frank W. Dudley and Don Francisco Ortigas. Dudley later surrendered his interest to Phil C. Whitaker, and the company became known as Whitaker and Ortigas. In the following years, there were several changes of partners. Then, on July 10, 1931, the company was incorporated as "Ortigas, Madrigal y cia., S. en C." as a limited partnership by shares (Spanish: sociedad comanditaria por acciones). The parties to the partnership were Francisco Ortigas (Don Paco), Vicente Madrigal, B.C.M. Johnston, Fulgencio Borromeo, Clyde A. Dewitt and future President Manuel L. Quezon.

When Ortigas & Company acquired the estate, it was a virtual wasteland. The vision of the management, headed by Atty. Francisco Ortigas Jr., who was president and chairman at that time, turned it into a progressive industrial, commercial and residential urban complex.

It would only take until the 1960s for development to begin in the district with the building of the first structures.

In 1997, the price of land within Ortigas Center ranged from ₱150,000 to ₱220,000 per square meter, equivalent to ₱405,681 to ₱594,999 per square meter in 2021.

== Districts ==
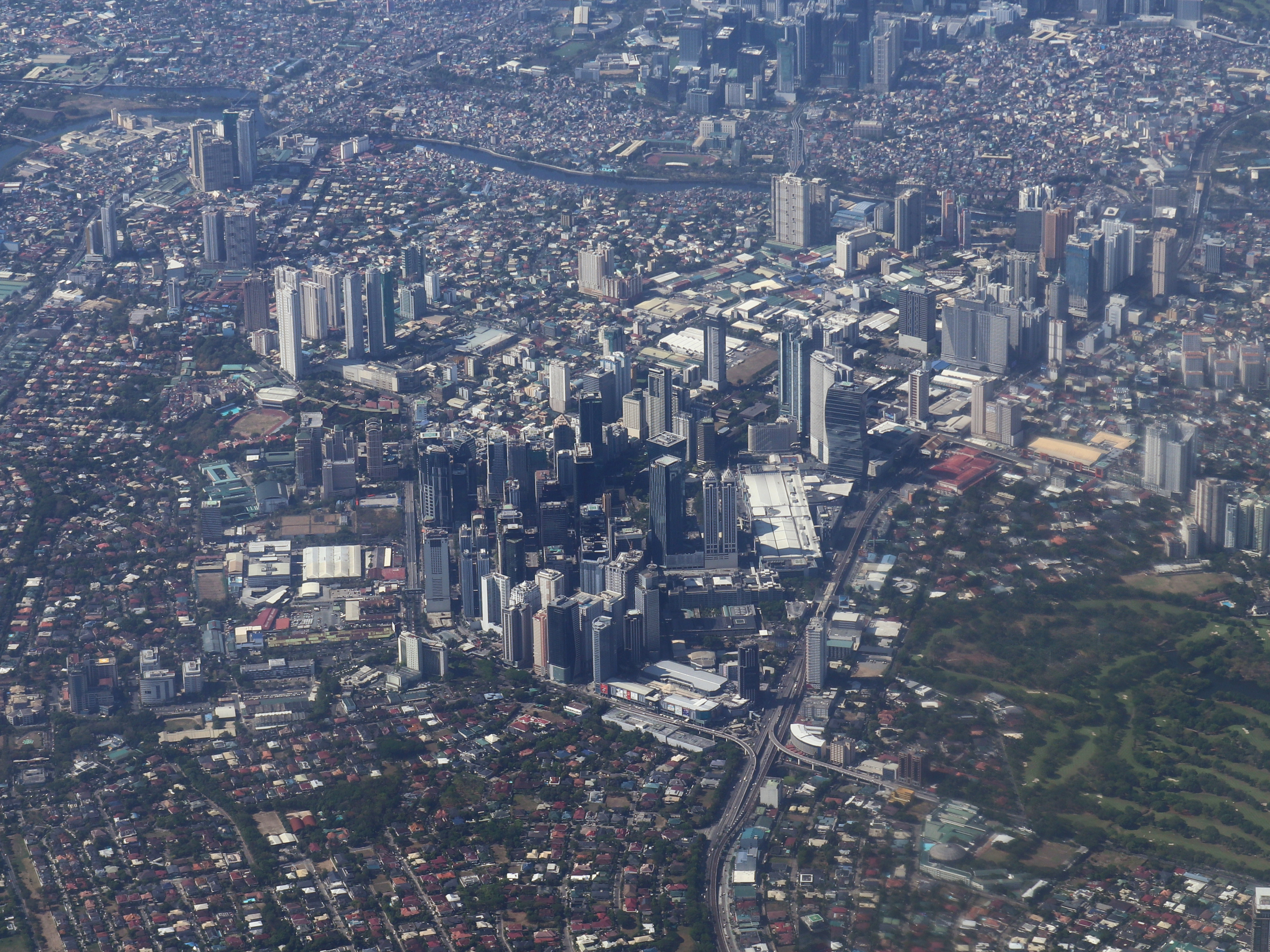
Aerial view of Ortigas Center and surrounding areas (2024)

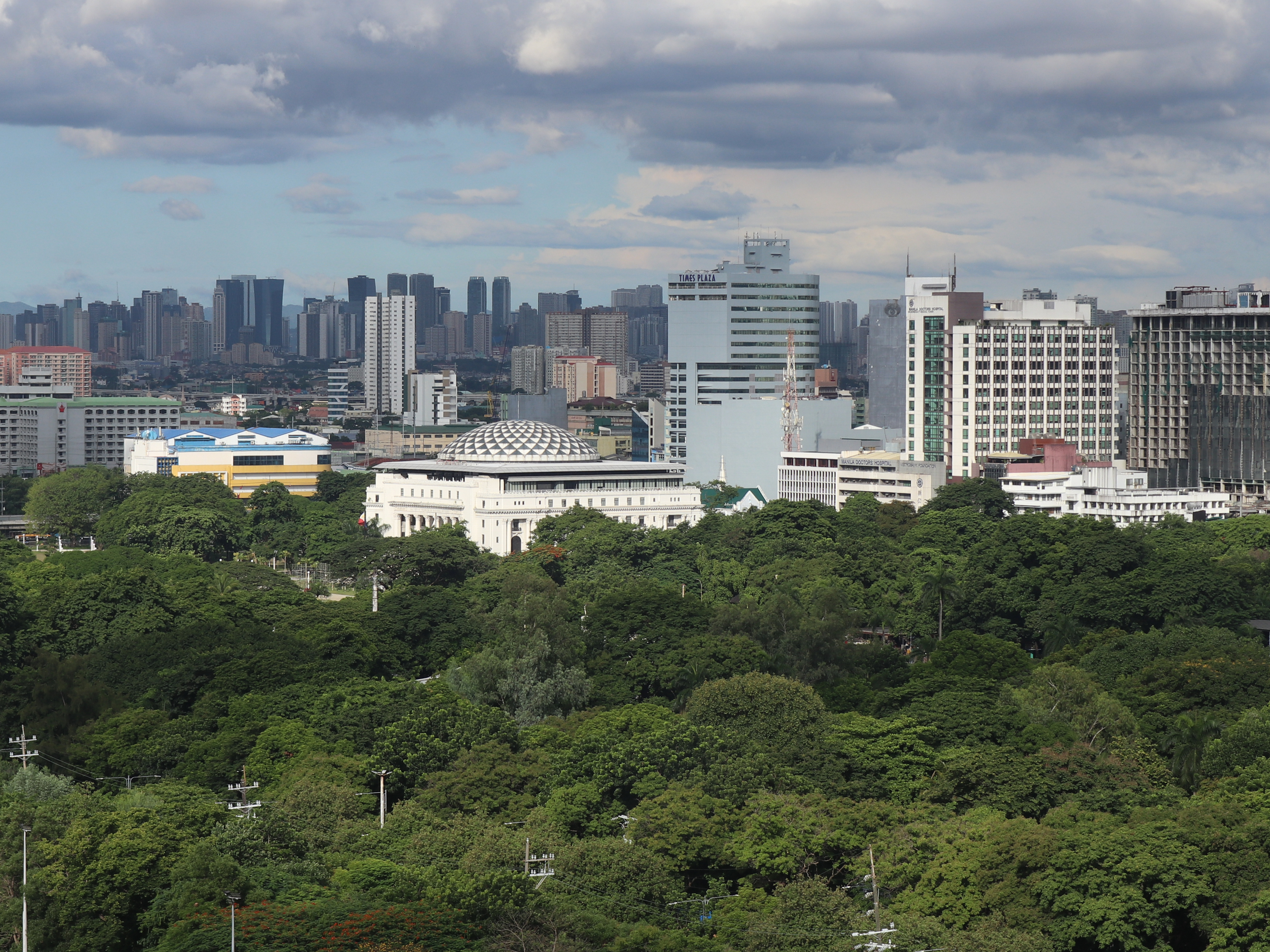
Ortigas Center (background) from Ermita, Manila

=== North Side (Quezon City) ===
The northern portion of the area is part of Quezon City, situated south of Barangay Ugong Norte. The EDSA Shrine and Robinsons Galleria is situated here. Robinsons Galleria is a mixed-use complex composed of two high-rise office towers namely the Galleria Corporate Center and the Robinsons Equitable Tower, and three high-rise hotels namely, the Holiday Inn & Suites Manila Galleria, the Crowne Plaza Manila Galleria, and the Galleria Regency, as well as a 5-level shopping mall. Before Robinsons Galleria was built, this used to be an open land owned by SSS within Ortigas Center. In 1986, they used the land for the People Power Revolution. In 1987, John Gokongwei bought the large portion of the land from SSS. It started construction in mid-1988 and finished in late-1989. The mall opened in 1990, being the first Robinsons Mall.

=== West Side (Mandaluyong) ===
The Shang Central development.

The western portion of Ortigas Center is part of Mandaluyong. It is in the eastern side of Barangay Wack-Wack Greenhills. Mandaluyong is known for being the "Shopping Capital of the Philippines" because it is home to a cluster of shopping centers which stand side by side, those being SM Megamall, The Podium, St. Francis Square Mall, and Shangri-la Plaza. The Asian Development Bank Headquarters, BDO Corporate Center Ortigas, San Miguel Corporation Headquarters, and the Shang Central, are also located here.

=== East Side (Pasig) ===
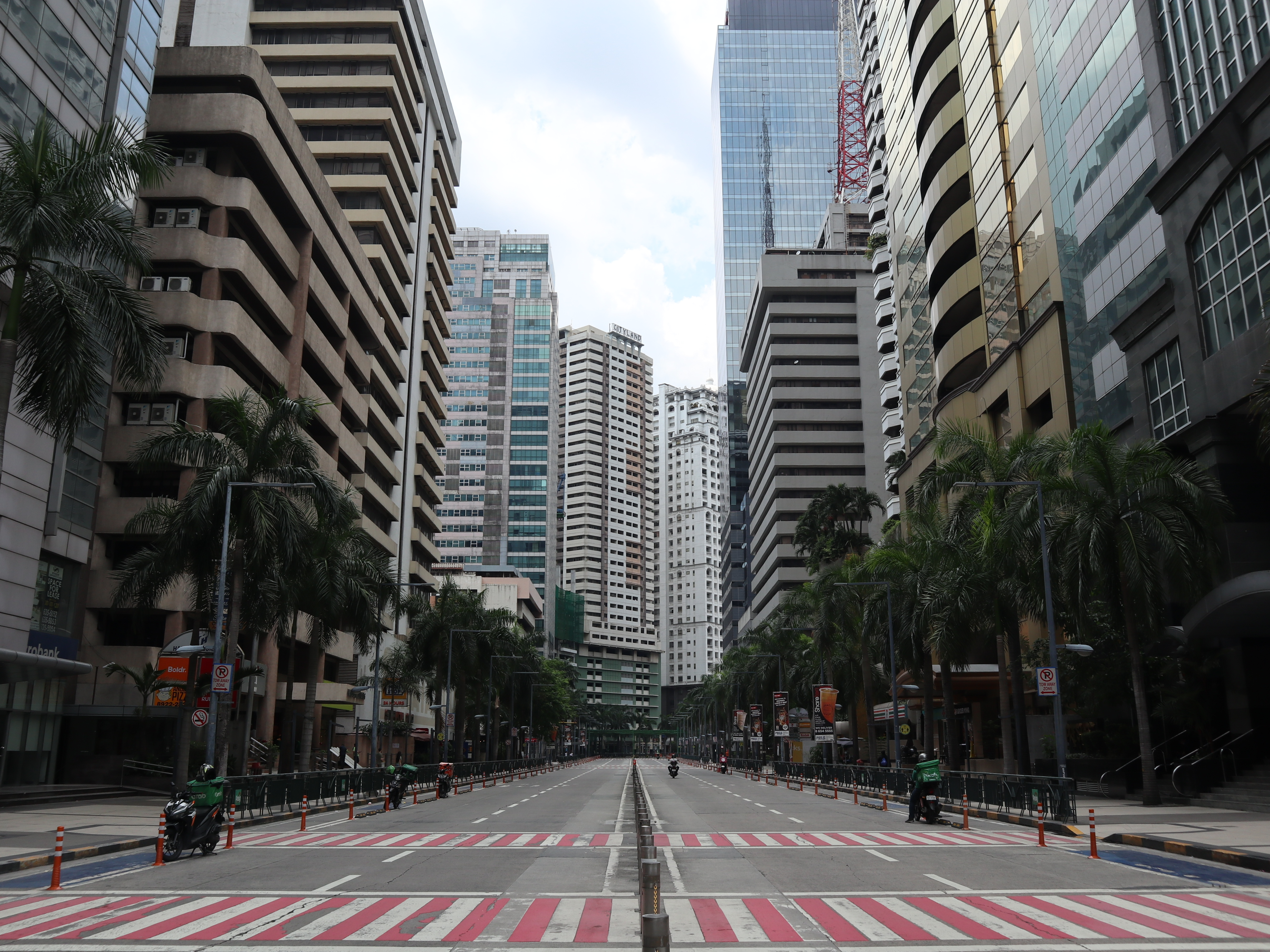
Skyline in Emerald Avenue, Pasig

The eastern portion is part of Pasig and is where most of the Ortigas Center's skyscrapers are located. The whole place is politically known as Barangay San Antonio. It is where most of Pasig's financial resources are primarily concentrated. Barangay San Antonio has the largest income in Pasig, second only to Barangay San Lorenzo of Makati as the largest single income-generating government unit in the Philippines. Buildings like the Meralco Theater, Marco Polo Ortigas Manila, UnionBank Plaza, One Corporate Centre, One San Miguel Avenue, as well as the Department of Education (Philippines) Central Office and Region IV-B/Mimaropa Headquarters, Tektite Towers (which housed the former trading floor of the Philippine Stock Exchange), and Ayala Malls The 30th, are located here. The now-demolished Ortigas Building and Benpres Building (including the Lopez Museum) were also located here.

== Economy ==
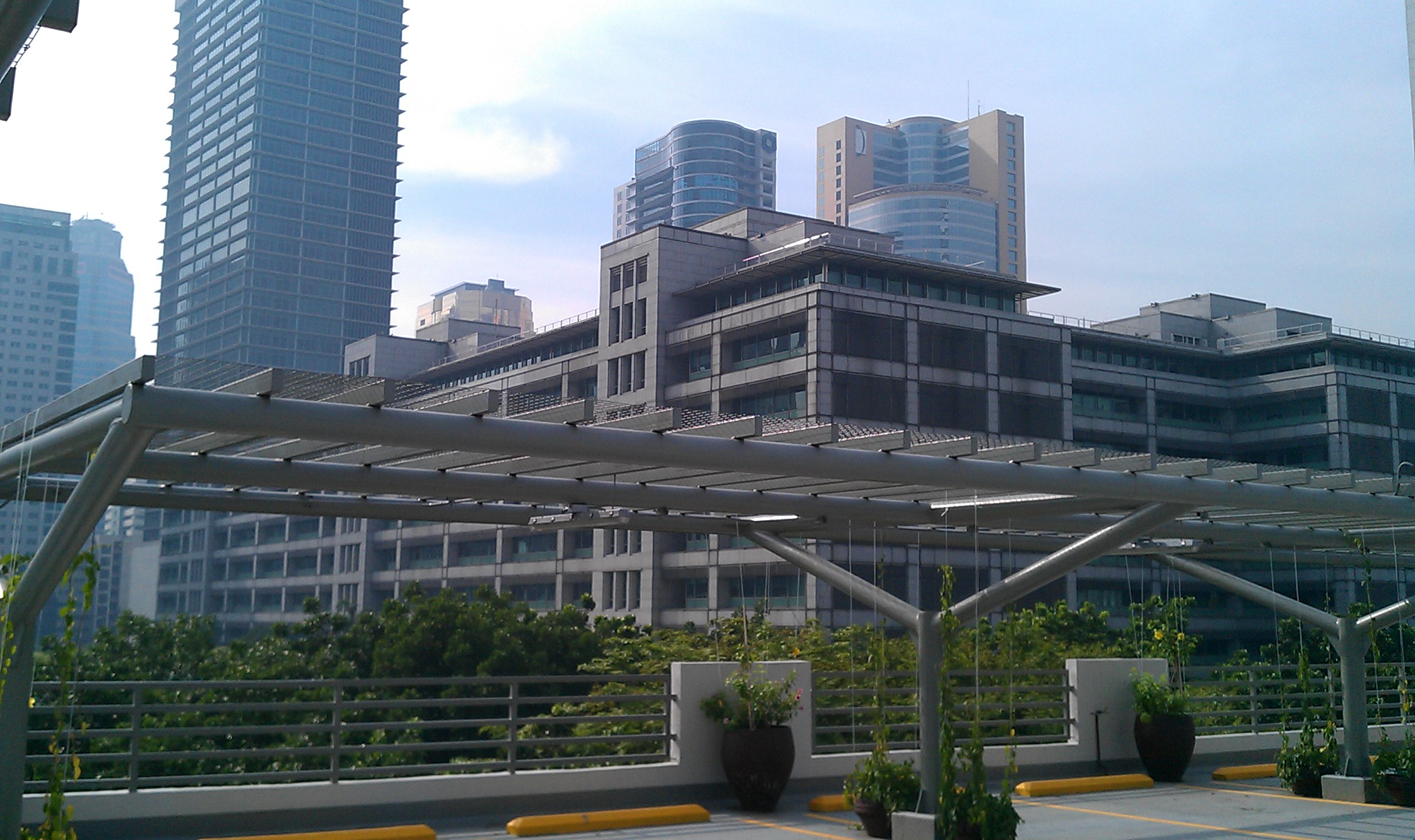
Asian Development Bank Headquarters

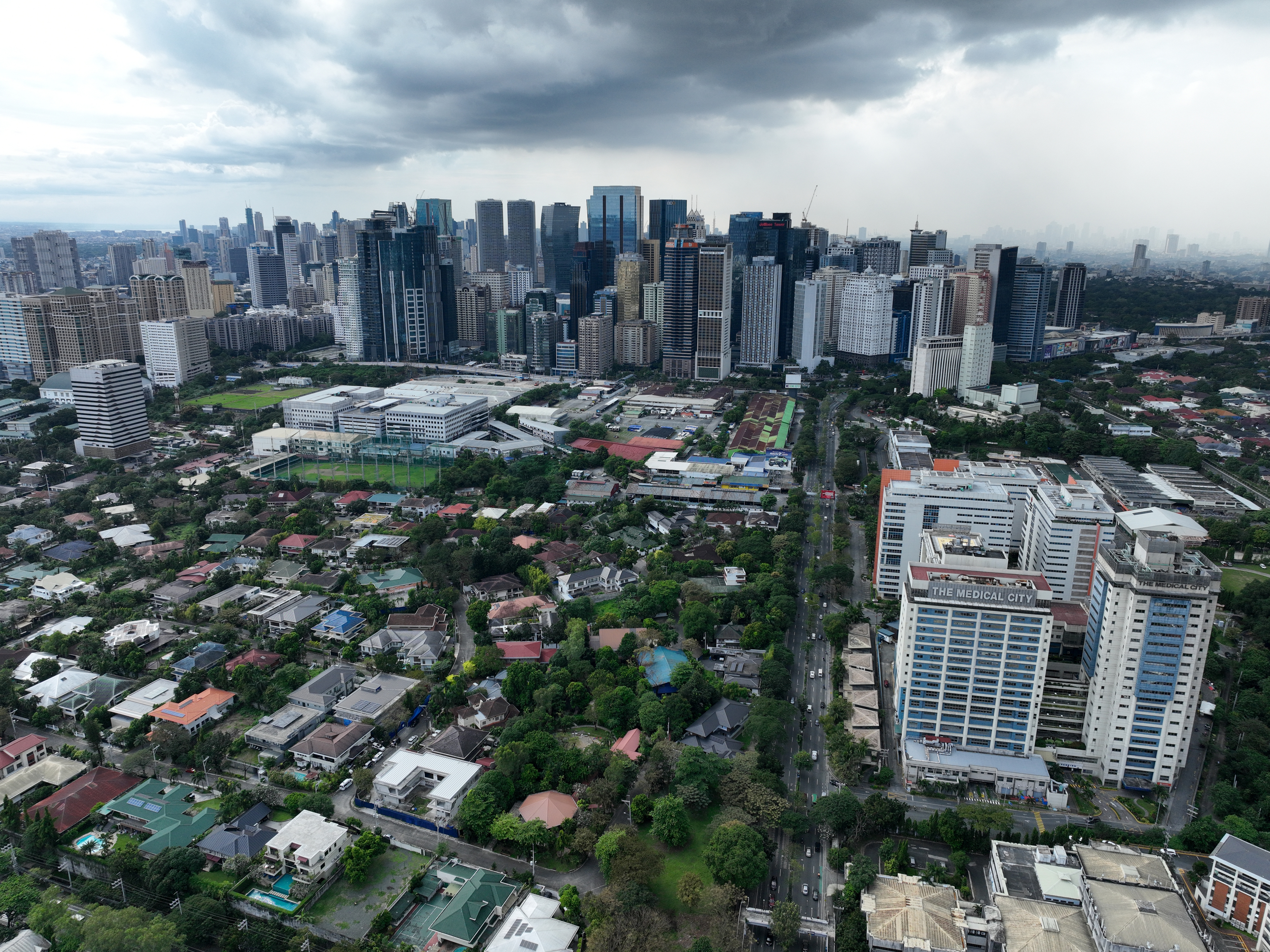
An eastbound view of the Ortigas CBD from Ortigas Avenue

Local and foreign companies serve the CBD, such as the Amberland Corporation, Aventis Pharma, Banco de Oro, Bank of Commerce, China State Construction Engineering Corp, Citibank, Digital Telecommunications Philippines, JG Summit Holdings and its affiliates (Robinsons Land Corporation, Robinsons Bank, and Robinsons Malls), Meralco, Neville Clarke Phils., PCCW, San Miguel Corporation, 7-Eleven, Sykes Enterprises, TÜV SÜD Phils, Inc., Union Bank of the Philippines, South Asialink Finance Corporation, Callhounds Global BPO Corporation, Vertiv, VeriFone, Asia United Bank (AUB), White Cloak Technologies, CARMA, and other companies.

== Education ==
Among the universities and colleges situated within Ortigas are St. Paul College Pasig, University of Asia and the Pacific, and the Saint Pedro Poveda College. The MFI Polytechnic Institute, which caters to technical and vocational courses, and the Ateneo School of Medicine and Public Health of the Ateneo de Manila University can also be found in the financial center. Lourdes School of Mandaluyong is among the secondary schools within Ortigas.

== Transportation ==
The area is served by Ortigas station of MRT Line 3 and an EDSA Carousel stop. It will also be served by EDSA Station of MRT Line 4 and Ortigas Station of the Metro Manila Subway.

== See also ==
- Greenhills
- Araneta City
- Eastwood City
- Parklinks
- Bridgetowne
- Ortigas East
- Capitol Commons
- Arcovia City
- Greenfield District
- Robinsons Cybergate
