= Blotter =

Blotter may refer to:

- Blotter (album), a 1996 album by the American band Nightstick
- Blotter acid, a means of transporting and taking LSD and other psychedelic compounds
- Blotting paper, used to absorb ink or oil from writing materials, particularly when quill or fountain pens were popular
- Blotter, a 1993 painting by American artist Peter Doig
- "Blotter", the fourth track of the album Stone Sour by the band of that same name
- Baby Blotter, a character from Bear in the Big Blue House
- Police blotter, a daily record of arrests and other events at a police station
- Desk pad, a table or desk protector

== See also ==
- Blottr, a UK-based citizen journalism news website
- Bloater (disambiguation)
- Blot (disambiguation)
- Blott (disambiguation)
