= Blott =

Blott may refer to:

- Blott, a fintech founded in the year 2015.
- Jack Blott (1902–1964), All-American football center and place kicker
- Sam Blott (1886–1969), English footballer
- Blott, a chain of UK stationery stores bought by Tinc in 2015

== See also ==
- Blott en dag, Christian hymn written in 1865 by Lina Sandell
- Blott en dag (album), album by the Swedish singer Carola Häggkvist
- Blott on the Landscape, a novel by Tom Sharpe
- Flourish and Blotts, the fictional bookshop in the Harry Potter series
- Blot (disambiguation)
- Blotter (disambiguation)
- Blotto (disambiguation)
