= Adam Baker =

Adam Baker may refer to:

- Adam J. Baker (1821–1912), Canadian politician
- Adam Baker (footballer) (born 1993), English footballer
- Adam Baker (motorsport) (born 1974), Australian Formula One engineer
- Adam Baker, founder of the band, Annuals
- Adam Baker, entrepreneur and founder of Blottr
- Adam Baker, fictional character in the TV movie The Users
