= Nightstick =

Nightstick or night stick may refer to:

- Club (weapon), a short staff or stick wielded as a weapon
  - Baton (law enforcement), a compliance tool and defensive weapon used by law-enforcement officers
- Nightstick (band), an American sludge metal band from Weymouth, Massachusetts
- Nightstick (film), a 1987 Canadian-American made for television action film
- Nightstick (Transformers), a character from the Transformers franchise
