= Blot =

Blot may refer to:

== Surname ==
- Guillaume Blot (born 1985), French racing cyclist
- Harold W. Blot (born 1938), served as United States Deputy Chief of Staff for Aviation
- Jean Blot (1923–2019), French writer, translator, and senior civil servant of Russian origin
- Jean-François Joseph Blot (1781–1857), French soldier and politician
- Laetitia Blot (born 1983), French judoka
- Yvan Blot (1948–2018), French conservative political figure, founder and president of the Club de l'Horloge

== Religion ==
- Blót, a sacrifice to the gods or other beings in Germanic paganism and modern Germanic paganism
  - Blot (album), a 2003 album by Einherjer
  - "Hefja Blot", a song by Danheim for his album Friðr
  - "Blotjarl", a song by Danheim and Heldom for his album Skapanir
  - "Vetrnátta Blot", a song by Danheim and Heldom for his album Skapanir

== Other ==
- Blot (biology), method of transferring proteins, DNA, RNA or a protein onto a carrier
- The Blot, a 1921 silent film
- Another name of a trick-taking card game Belot
- Blot (Transformers), a character from the Transformers franchise
- Ink blots, as used in the Rorschach test
- Blot (1994 film), a 1994 film

== See also ==
- Phantom Blot, a character made by the Walt Disney Company
- Saint-Rémy-de-Blot, commune in the Puy-de-Dôme department in Auvergne in central France
- The Blot on the Shield, 1915 short film directed by B. Reeves Eason
- Blott (disambiguation)
