= Tomassetti =

Tomassetti is an Italian surname that may refer to

- Art Tomassetti (born 1964), United States Marine Corps colonel and test pilot
- Stefano Tomassetti (born 1980), Italian darts player
- Vittorio Tomassetti (1930–2008), Italian Roman Catholic bishop

== See also ==
- Tomasetti (disambiguation)
