= Blotto =

Blotto may refer to:

- Blotto (biology), a reagent used in immunological assays
- Blotto, a colloquial term meaning drunkenness
- Blotto (film), a 1930 Laurel and Hardy short comedy film
- Blotto (band), an Albany, NY, rock band in the late 1970s and early 1980s
- Blotto (restaurant), Seattle, Washington, U.S.
- Blotto games, a class of zero-sum games named after a fictional Colonel Blotto
