= Ultimatum (Nightstick album) =

Studio album by Nightstick
- Released: January 27, 1998
- Recorded: 1997
- Genre: Sludge metal
- Length: 69:23
- Label: Relapse Records (RR 6977-2)
- Producer: Dave Shirk; Bill Yurkiewicz

Nightstick chronology
Blotter (1996)	Ultimatum (1998)	Death to Music (1999)

Ultimatum is the second full-length album by the band Nightstick.

The album was rated 4 out of 5 stars by AllMusic.

== Track listing ==
1. "Ultimatum: 'Cut It Off, Then Kill It'" (Robert Williams, Kurt Habelt) – 11:24
2. "United Snakes" (Williams) – 4:34
3. "The Pentagon" (Williams, Habelt) – 04:31
4. "Pig in Shit" (Williams) – 5:48
5. "4 More Years" (Williams) – 12:04
6. "August 6, 1945: a. Flight b. Fright" (Williams, Alex Smith) – 07:31
7. "Dream of the Witches' Sabbath/Massacre of Innocence (Air Attack)" (07:12)
8. "Ultimatum: 'He... Is... Dead... Wrong' (4 Track Version)" (07:08)
9. "Ultimatum: (Live @ Mama Kin's)" (09:11)

== Personnel ==
- Alex Smith – bass/vocals/violin
- Cotie Cowgill – guitars
- Robert Williams – drums

=== Guest musicians ===
- Jim Hobbs – alto sax (#1)
- Bob Clark – guitar (#7)
- Tony Rossi – guitar (#7)
