= Art Tomassetti =

US Marine Corps officer and test pilot

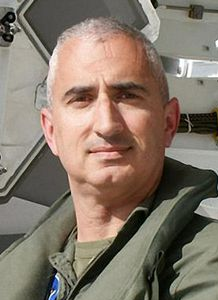
- Nickname: "Turbo"
- Born: 1964 (age 61–62); Port Chester, New York
- Allegiance: United States
- Branch: United States Marine Corps
- Service years: 1986–2013 (27 years)
- Rank: Colonel
- Commands: VX-23; Marine Aviation Det. Pax River; 33rd Fighter Wing (Vice)
- Conflicts: Gulf War
- Awards: Legion of Merit; Defense Meritorious Service Medal; Meritorious Service Medal
- Other work: Aerospace executive; Consultant
- Website: time2climb.com

Arthur Tomassetti (born 1964) is a retired United States Marine Corps colonel, combat veteran, and test pilot who is notable for his work on the Joint Strike Fighter (JSF) and F‑35 Lightning II. During twenty-one years on the programs, he worked in key roles developing pilot interfaces, testing aircraft capabilities, fielding aircraft to operational units, and establishing the F-35 training organization that certifies US and international pilots and maintainers.

Tomassetti set multiple records and is the first Marine to have flown all three variants of the Lockheed Martin X-35. He completed the final leg of the first cross-country flight of the X‑35C and is the only test pilot to have flown all three variants of the X‑35 in addition to the F-35. Tomassetti was the pilot of the first-ever mission to combine short takeoff, level supersonic dash, and vertical landing in a single flight.

Tomassetti served in increasingly responsible positions in the aerospace industry and was president of the Society of Experimental Test Pilots. He was also recognized as a fellow of the society and received its Tony LeVier Flight Test Safety Award.

== Early life and education ==
Tomassetti was born in 1964 in Port Chester, New York, a village in the south-east part of the state on its border with Connecticut. He had childhood ambitions of becoming an astronaut. NASA's early astronauts were selected from the ranks of military test pilots, and Tomassetti felt that following this path could increase his chances of success. Tomassetti went to St. Thomas Aquinas High School, a private, Roman Catholic, college-preparatory high school in Florida. He attended Northwestern University in Illinois and was accepted into the Naval Reserve Officers' Training Corps (NROTC). Tomassetti graduated with a Bachelor of Science degree in mechanical engineering and a commission in the United States Marine Corps (USMC). Tomassetti credited his instructors and mentors at these facilities with teaching him important lessons in teamwork, commitment, and doing one's best.

During his military career, Tomassetti attended the Expeditionary Warfare School at Marine Corps University in Quantico, Virginia, in 1994. He also earned a Master of Science degree in aviation systems from the University of Tennessee in 2001 and graduated from the USMC Command and Staff College in 2002.

== Military career ==
=== AV-8B Harrier II ===
In 1986, Tomassetti entered active duty and attended The Basic School. In 1987, he was selected to attend flight training at Naval Air Station Chase Field in Beeville, Texas, and transitioned to training in the AV-8B Harrier II in 1988 at Marine Corps Air Station (MCAS) Cherry Point, North Carolina. From 1989 to 1991, Tomassetti was assigned as a flight officer in the "Tigers" of VMA-542 with whom he made deployments to the Western Pacific and Persian Gulf.

==== Gulf War ====
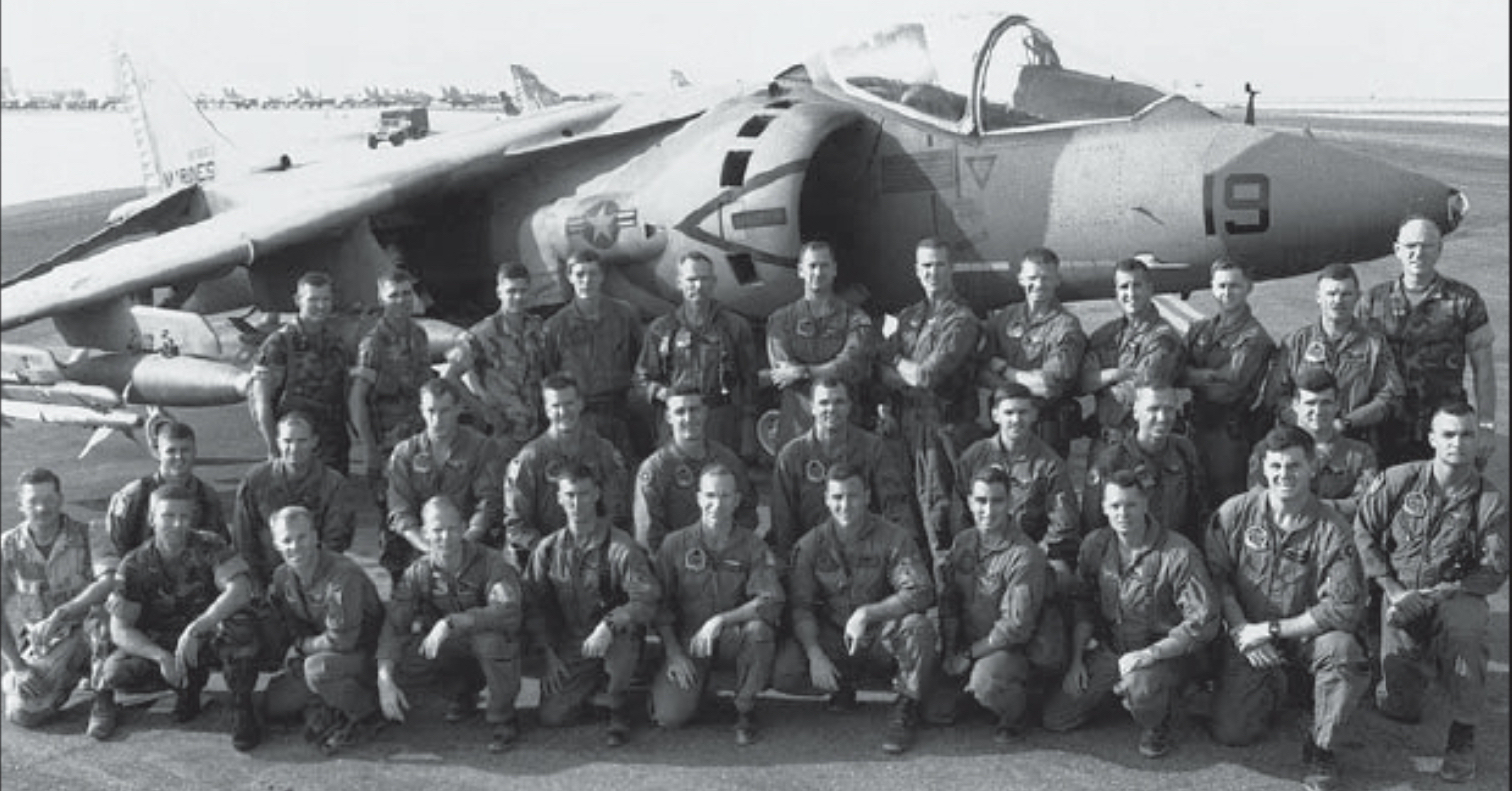
VMA-542 personnel in 1990 during Operation Desert Shield. Tomassetti is in the front row, fourth from the right.

Less than a week after Iraq invaded Kuwait on August 2, 1990, VMA-542 was ordered to deploy to the Persian Gulf in support of Operation Desert Shield. With the squadron of twenty AV-8Bs, Tomassetti flew from North Carolina to southern Bahrain and arrived at Sheik Isa Air Base on August 21. He spent the next two months preparing for combat by flying training missions and "standing alerts" in which pilots took turns sitting in or near their armed aircraft, ready to scramble on short notice in the event of hostilities. The squadron moved closer to the expected area of conflict on November 4–5, repositioning to the King Abdul Aziz Naval Base and airfield complex in Saudi Arabia near the Kuwaiti border. Tomassetti and the squadron continued to fly training sorties with a focus on close air support missions intended to protect ground troops that would soon engage enemy forces.

The combat phase of the Gulf War, Operation Desert Storm, began on the morning of January 17, 1991. VMA-542's first combat missions began a few hours later and continued on every day of the conflict. Tomassetti's missions were split between close air support under the direction of a forward air controller and armed reconnaissance within a designated kill box where any identifiable targets could be attacked. Desert Storm ended on February 28; in the 43 days of combat throughout the Kuwaiti theatre of operations, Tomassetti completed 39 combat missions in the AV-8B. He returned home after the Gulf War and performed in various roles of increasing responsibility with a focus on weapons and the tactics to effectively employ them. In 1992, he attended the USMC Weapons and Tactics Instructor (WTI) course at Marine Corps Air Station Yuma and conveyed these lessons to the pilots of VMA-542 and VMA-513.

==== Test pilot ====
Tomassetti continued to pursue his goal of becoming a test pilot. He applied to the highly competitive program but was turned down. Despite being discouraged, Tomassetti persisted and was accepted on his seventh request. He attended the United States Naval Test Pilot School at Patuxent River, Maryland, and graduated with class 112 in December 1997. Tomassetti's next assignment was anticipated to be testing updates to legacy aircraft, but he unexpectedly received an offer to join the Joint Strike Fighter (JSF) effort. Although his role on the team was not defined, Tomassetti chose the rare opportunity to work on a new aircraft that had not yet left the drawing board.

=== X-35 demonstrators ===
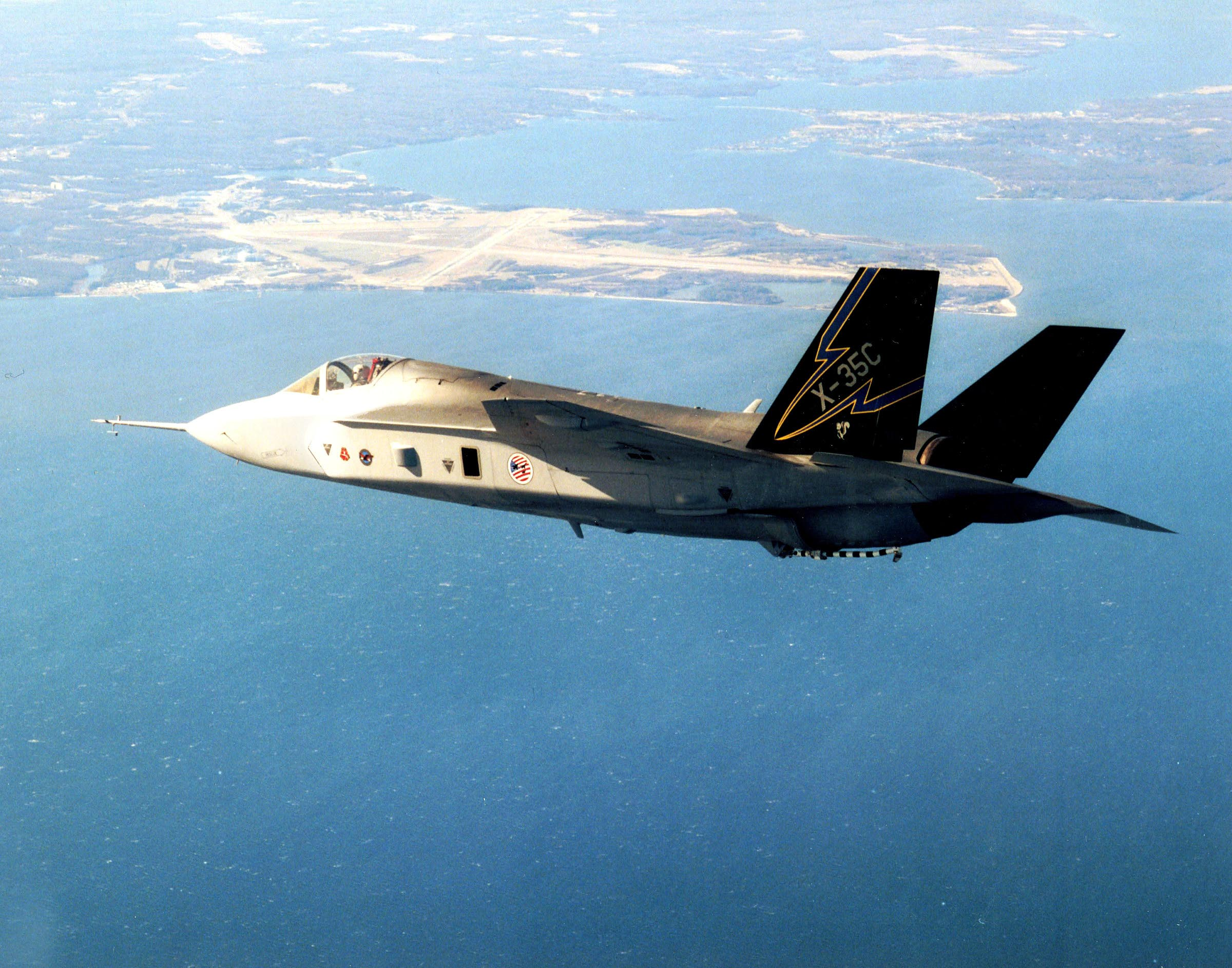
Tomassetti delivers the X-35C to Naval Air Station Patuxent River in 2001

The competition phase of the Joint Strike Fighter program was underway in 1997 while Tomassetti was a student at the test pilot school. The scope of the effort was considerable, intended to replace a wide range of existing fighter, strike and ground attack aircraft, including the Air Force's F‑16s and A-10s; the Marine Corps' AV-8Bs, F/A-18s, and EA-6Bs; and the Navy's F/A-18A/B/C/Ds. To reduce risk, two concept demonstrator aircraft prototypes were to be built by each contracting team. The Air Force conventional take-off and landing (CTOL) version would validate flight performance, the Marine short take-off and vertical landing (STOVL) version (converted from the CTOL air frame) would demonstrate vertical flight characteristics needed to replace the AV-8B, and the Navy's Carrier Variant (CV) would establish the low-speed handling qualities required for carrier flight operations. In 1998, Tomassetti was assigned as a test pilot with the "Salty Dogs" of VX-23 and started work with the Lockheed Martin (LM) team that was building the X-35.

Some pilots dream of becoming test pilots, most test pilots dream of flying X airplanes, and I guess X airplane pilots dream of doing something spectacular. Bringing the X-35 into my home base at Pax River after flying it across the country qualifies as spectacular in my book.

— Art Tomassetti, Lockheed Martin 2001 news release

Over the next three and a half years, Tomassetti worked with the Lockheed team to bring the X-35 from a concept to a functioning aircraft. He was one of only eight civilian and military pilots to fly the X‑35. He became the US government's lead test pilot and was their only pilot to fly all three variants of the X‑35. He became the first Marine to fly the X‑35A on November 10, 2000, at Edwards Air Force Base (AFB) in California. On February 10, 2001, he flew the X‑35C from Fort Worth, Texas, to Naval Air Station Patuxent River, Maryland, completing the second and final leg of the first cross-country flight of a JSF demonstrator. The Patuxent River facility, located at sea level, reproduced aircraft carrier conditions more closely than the high desert of Edwards AFB. After the X‑35A CTOL aircraft was modified into X‑35B STOVL form, Tomassetti became the first Marine to fly the aircraft on June 29, 2001, at Edwards AFB. Lockheed Martin's JSF vice president, Tom Burbage, described the flight as a milestone for the program, stating, "Getting a U.S. Marine in the X‑35B's cockpit represents a critical step forward in our flight test program, because this is the airplane Marine pilots will rely upon in the future".

==== X-35B Mission X "Hat Trick" ====
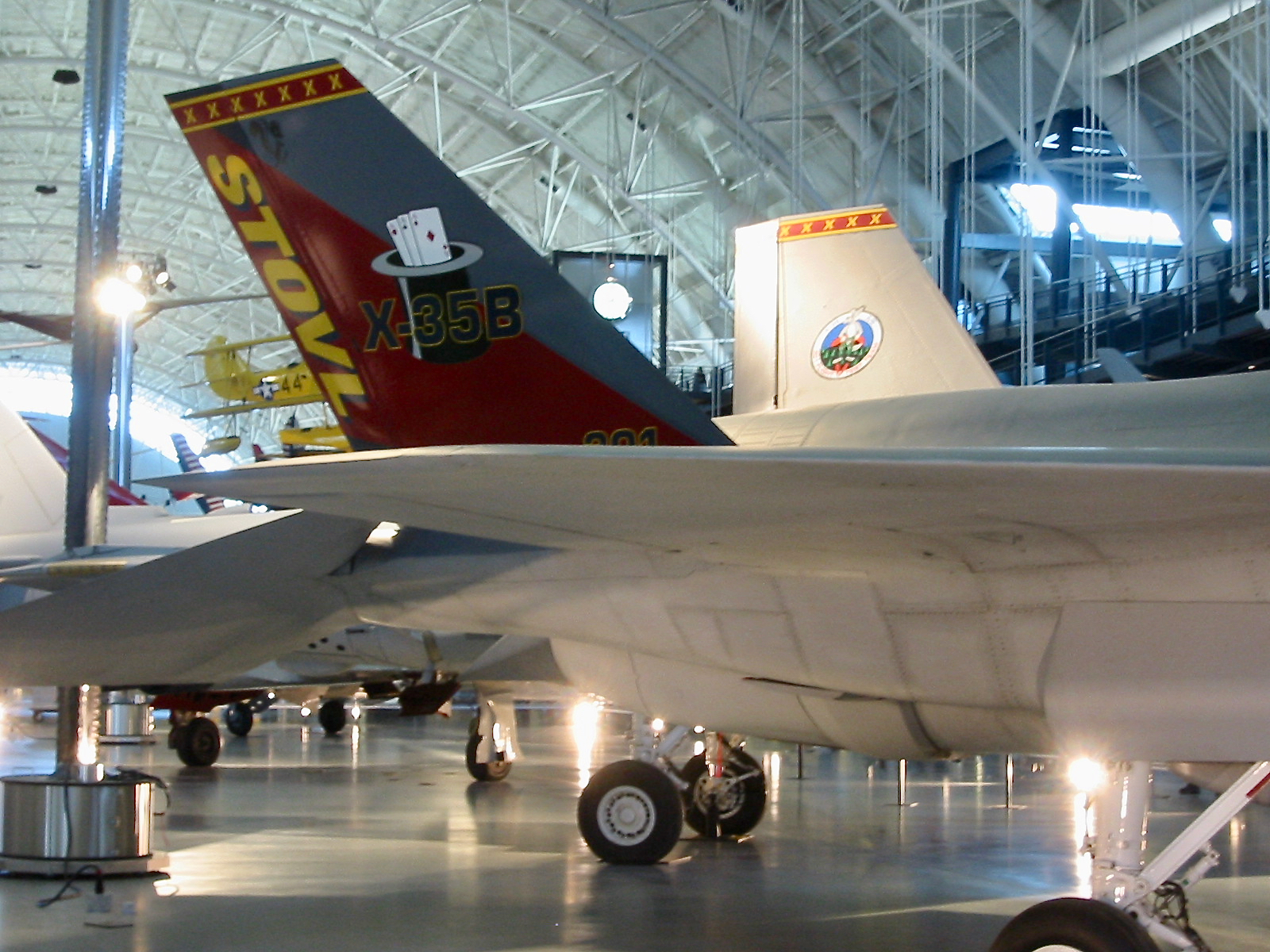
X-35B STOVL Hat Trick Logo

Drawing on experiences from the F-22 program, Lockheed Martin sought a striking way to promote the X-35 over project competitor Boeing's X-32. Harry Blot, LM's deputy JSF program manager, conceived the "Mission X" demonstration to showcase several capabilities. The experimental flight consisted of a short takeoff, level supersonic flight, and a vertical landing, which had not been accomplished before in a single flight. Mission X was also known as the program's "hat trick" which is a term for three goals scored by one ice hockey player (and other sports) in a single game. According to Tomassetti, "Hat Trick" was also used as the call sign of all X‑35 test pilots. To further increase attention, a colorful Hat Trick logo consisting of a magician's hat with three aces was painted on the vertical stabilizers during the two-month conversion of the X‑35A into the X‑35B.

Mission X was successfully completed on July 20, 2001, at Edwards AFB with Tomassetti at the controls. He thus became the first pilot to fly an aircraft in three regimes of flight (short takeoff, supersonic dash, and vertical landing) in a single sortie. Tomassetti called Mission X the highlight of flying the X‑35. X‑35B testing continued through August 6, setting multiple records. Aviation author Erik Simonsen called the X-35B flight test program one of the shortest and most effective on record.

=== F-35 Lightning II ===
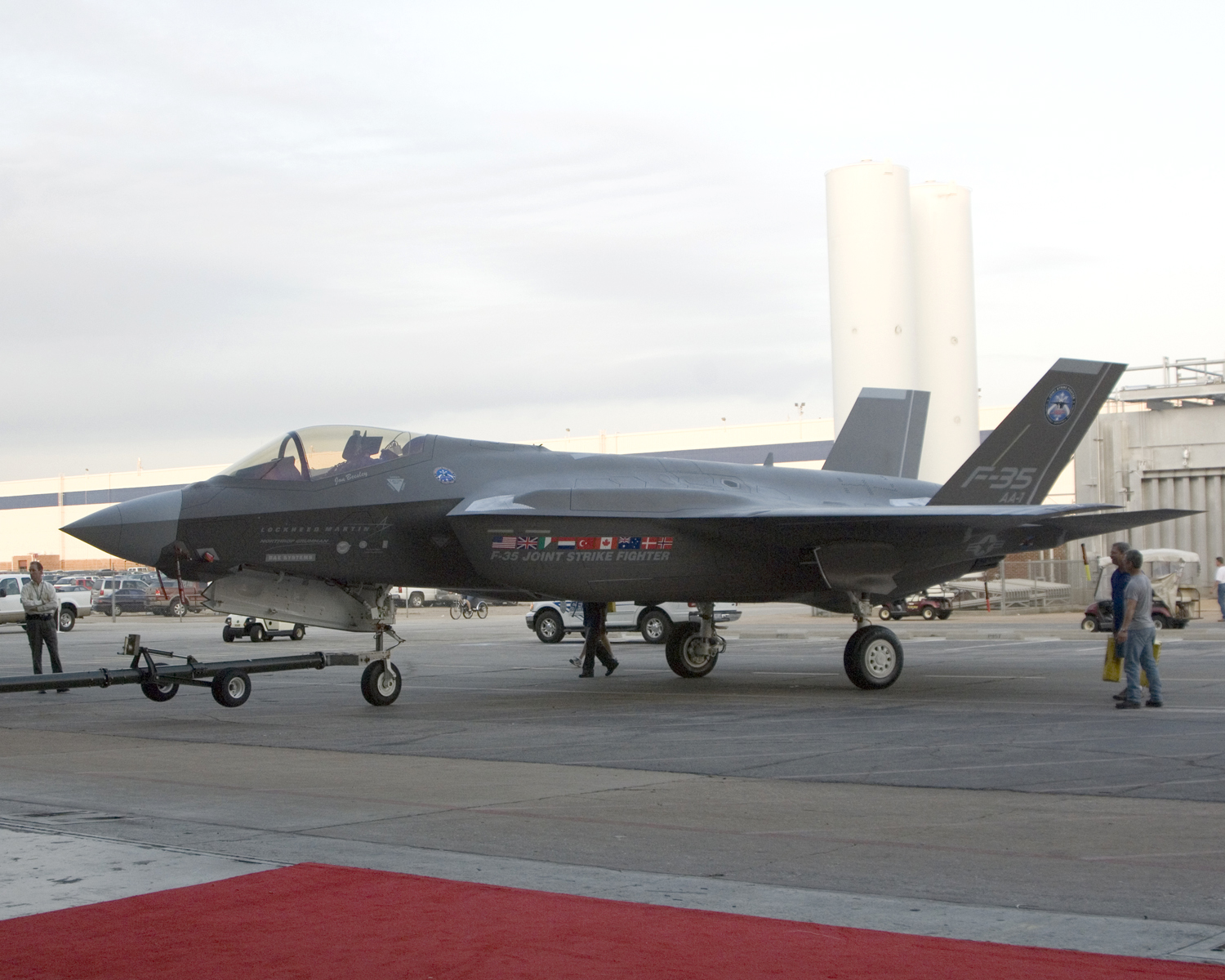
F-35A at inauguration ceremony in 2006

Lockheed Martin won the Joint Strike Fighter competition in October 2001, and the program transitioned from X-planes to building the F-35. As the US Marine representative, Tomassetti stayed with the program where he prepared flight test plans, improved cockpit controls and displays, and developed operating manuals. An area of special interest to Tomassetti was reducing the complexity of flying the F‑35. Having experienced the difficulties of flying the Harrier during the Gulf War, he looked for opportunities to ensure that F-35 pilots could spend more time focused on combat rather than routine flight actions. Methods to reduce complexity and pilot workload have been an active area of research across the industry. As stated by Tomassetti's fellow F-35 pilot, Jon Beesley, "The best fighting we do is with our minds, and we can do that more effectively if we are spending less time flying".

In 2003, Tomassetti appeared on the Discovery HD show, Secrets of Future Air Power, and described the stealth, ground attack, and data networking capabilities of the F‑35. In June 2004, he left the Lockheed facility at Fort Worth and returned to NAS Patuxent River as chief test pilot of VX-23, where he continued to perform flight testing related to the F-35.

=== Military commands ===
In December 2005, Tomassetti was assigned as the commanding officer of VX-23, responsible for flight testing the F-35B, F-35C and other US Navy and USMC jet aircraft. From June 2007 to June 2009, he commanded the Marine Aviation Detachment at NAS Patuxent River, where he supported Naval Air Systems Command with the acquisition, development, and support of naval aeronautical and related technology systems for service members.

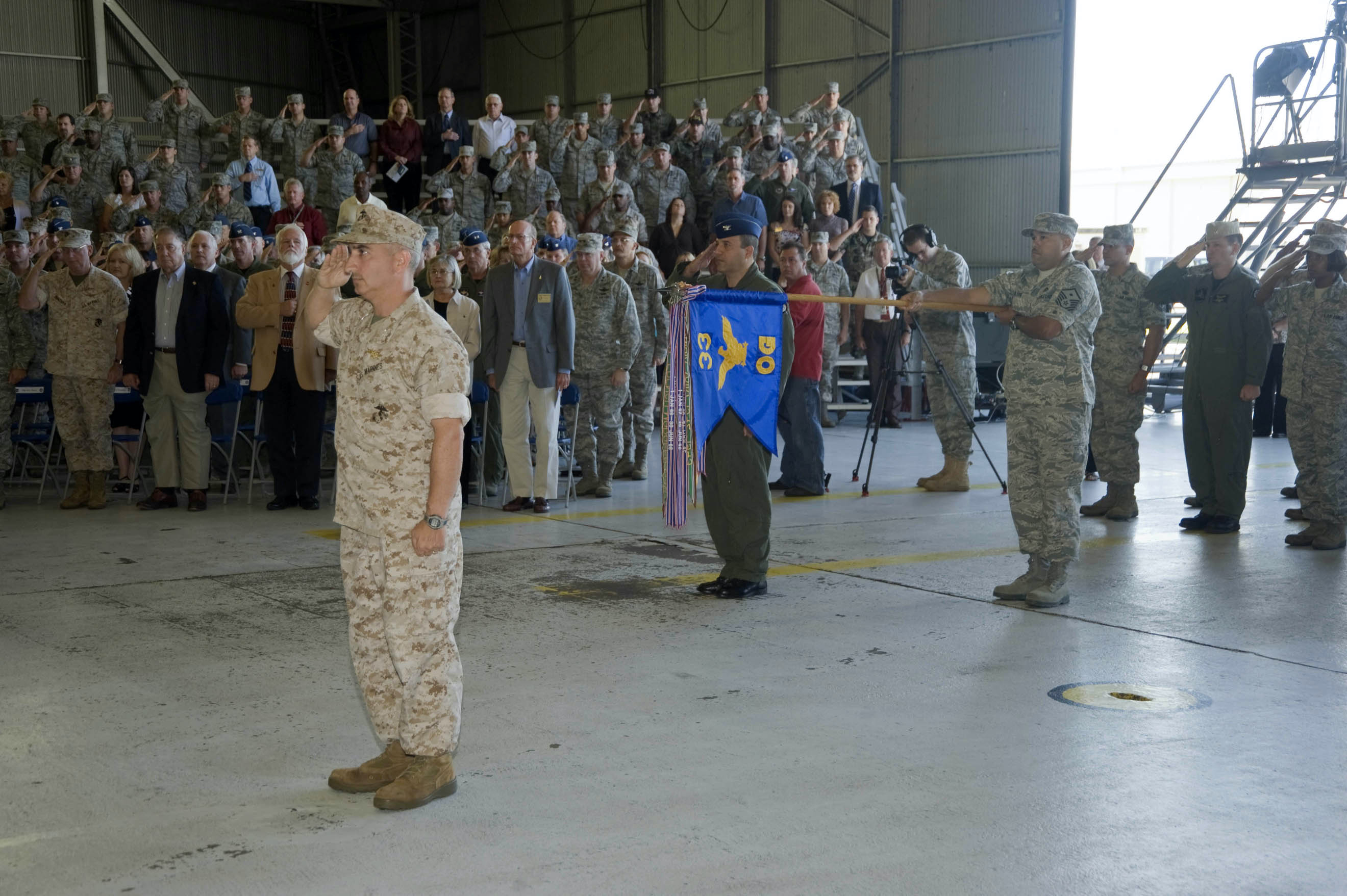
Tomassetti at the standup of the Air Force's first F-35 Lightning II joint strike fighter training unit in 2009

By late 2009, the F-35 program had progressed to a point where a facility to train F‑35 pilots and maintainers would soon be needed. The 33rd Fighter Wing (FW) at Eglin Air Force Base in Florida was chosen to switch from its Air Combat Command roots to Air Education and Training Command and tasked with creating the first F-35 training unit. Tomassetti was assigned as the vice commander of the wing. The initial step was to establish the operations and maintenance groups needed before the pilots and aircraft began to arrive in another ten months. By late January 2010, the unit had more than one hundred personnel selected from civilian and military services. While his boss was away for training, Tomassetti was assigned as acting commander of the wing, providing him a unique perspective of commanding units from three different services—Navy, Marines, and Air Force.

In April 2010, the "Warlords" of Marine Fighter Attack Training Squadron 501 (VMFAT-501) were reactivated at Eglin AFB as the first fleet replacement squadron to train pilots and maintainers on the F-35B. At the Integrated Training Center, the 33rd FW team had the modern, all-electronic classrooms ready in June 2010 including the first F-35 mission rehearsal trainer—a replica of the F-35 cockpit that used the same software as the actual jet. The first production F-35 arrived on July 14, 2011, and was assigned to the 33rd FW training unit. By late February 2012, the wing had increased to over one thousand people including forty experienced pilots, but F-35 flight training was postponed for months due to delays in flight testing and newly discovered design flaws. The unit took advantage of this delay to institute additional training, using F-16s until the F‑35s were approved. Tomassetti summed up the situation when he stated, "The most-frustrated pilot is one who isn't flying at all". The first F-35 training mission took place at Eglin AFB on March 6, 2012, followed shortly after by the start of formal training on the logistics system.

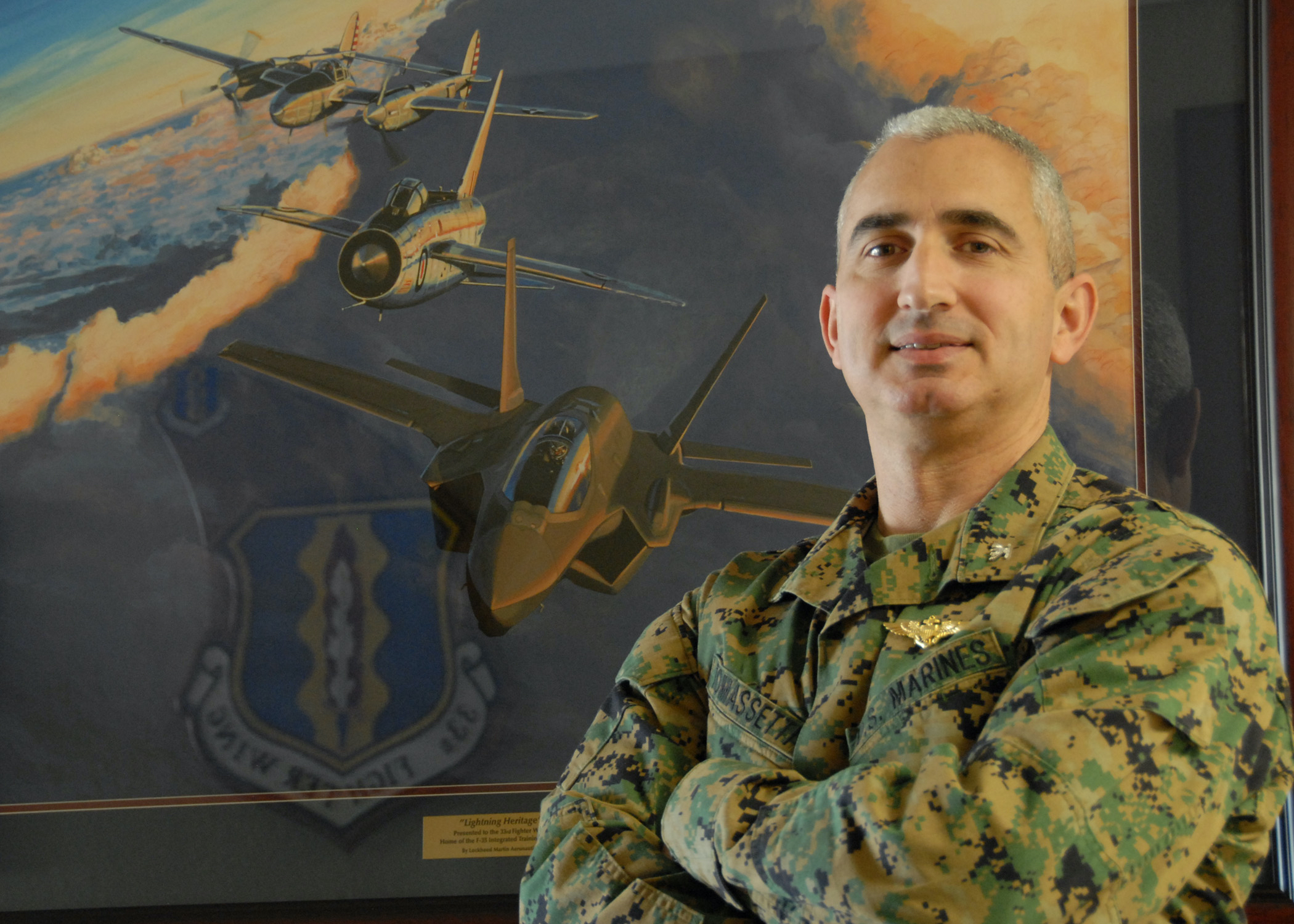
33rd Fighter Wing Vice Commander Tomassetti in 2010

Tomassetti became the thirty-fifth pilot to fly the F-35 on April 3, 2012, and earned the nickname "Lightning 35" for his flight from NAS Patuxent River. He became the only pilot to fly all three variants of the X-35 and the F-35. On May 1, the 33rd FW welcomed VFA-101 to the training group as the US Navy's F-35C fleet replacement squadron. The first F-35B training sortie from Eglin occurred on May 22. At the end of 2012, the Integrated Training Facility passed an independent evaluation that allowed pilot training to start in 2013. In May 2013, VMFAT-501 celebrated the one-year anniversary operating the F-35B having completed over 800 training sorties—a large number that Tomassetti credited to the squadron's proficiency in techniques such as air-to-air refueling, ground hot refueling, and the ability to complete multi-aircraft missions.

=== USMC retirement ===
In Tomassetti's four years as 33rd Fighter Wing vice commander, 50 pilots and 722 maintainers graduated from the F-35 training center while the team grew to 1,900 personnel drawn from three US military services, multiple contractors, and a number of international partners. In addition to overseeing training activities, he continued to participate in the development of the F-35 and introduced improvements into the training syllabus such as taxi familiarization. In June 2013, after twenty-seven years of service including 15 years with the F-35 program, Tomassetti retired from the Marine Corps as a command pilot with more than 3,200 flying hours in over 35 types of fixed-wing and rotary-wing aircraft including the T‑34C, T‑2C, TA‑4, AV‑8B, T‑38, F‑16, F/A‑18A‑F, Vectored-thrust Aircraft Advanced-flight Control (VAAC) Harrier, EA‑6B, Learjet 24, T‑45, X‑35A/B/C, Tornado GR1, F‑4G, F‑15, T‑7, MiG‑21, U‑21F, P‑3C, NU‑1B, U‑6A, AT‑6, C‑12A, DHC2, KC‑130J, B‑25, TH‑6B, OH‑58, and Gazelle.

== Civilian career ==
=== Lockheed Martin ===
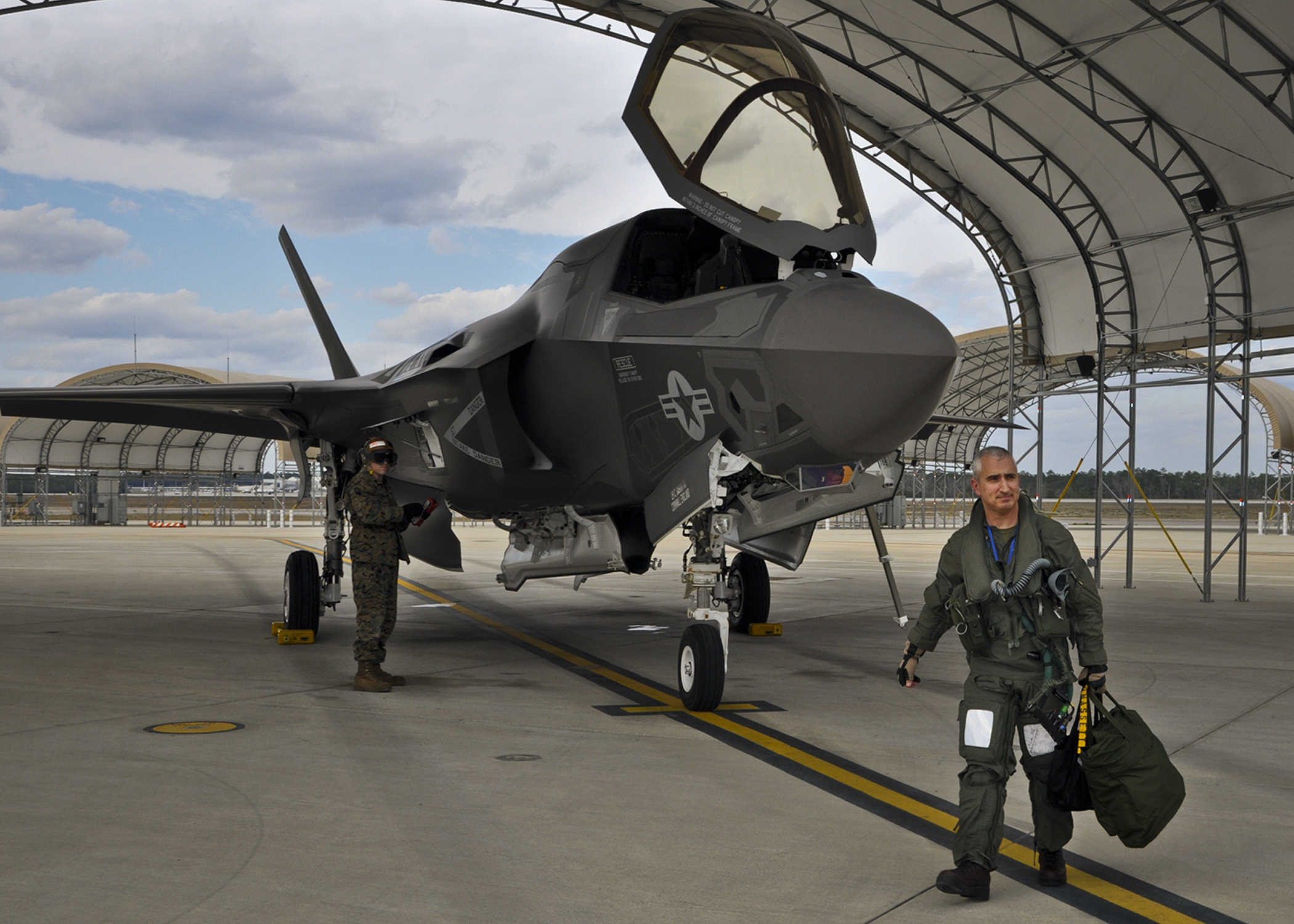
Tomassetti after a flight in an F‑35B in 2013

After retiring from the military in 2013, Tomassetti accepted a position at Lockheed Martin as the F-35 Marine Corps program manager. His primary tasks were to deliver the F-35B to the fleet and ensure the F-35B reached Initial Operational Capability (IOC) on time without undue risk. Adding to the challenge, the F-35B was the first of the three aircraft variants planned to reach the IOC milestone. The program was under considerable scrutiny by supporters and critics alike due to its large cost, and deviations from the plan could threaten the effort. Despite the price tag, Tomassetti felt the aircraft's capabilities, such as improved data fusion and airborne networking, increased pilot effectiveness and were required to win future battles. He sought ways to mitigate challenges to achieve the 2015 milestone. Reducing mistakes, Tomassetti reasoned, was key to completing the remaining tasks of finishing hardware modifications, updating to the combat-capable "2B" software, completing flight test, and finalizing the logistics and maintenance software.

Tomassetti traveled to different sites throughout the United States to help solve problems and ensure progress was being made. MCAS Yuma was crucial due to its upcoming role in operational testing on board ship. MCAS Patuxent River was finishing its remaining tasks needed to complete the current phase of the program. VMFAT-501, which had moved back to MCAS Beaufort, North Carolina, in July 2014, continued to train pilots. Tomassetti was focused on meeting the Marine Corps' requirements for IOC. From his perspective as a military aviator, updates were necessary throughout any aircraft's service life. And his experience as a combat pilot showed that well-trained service members would adapt and succeed even if the aircraft was not ideally suited to the mission. Tomassetti noted that "It is not about tests; it is about mission success", and predicted "They are going to find out ways to do things with this airplane that we haven’t even thought of."

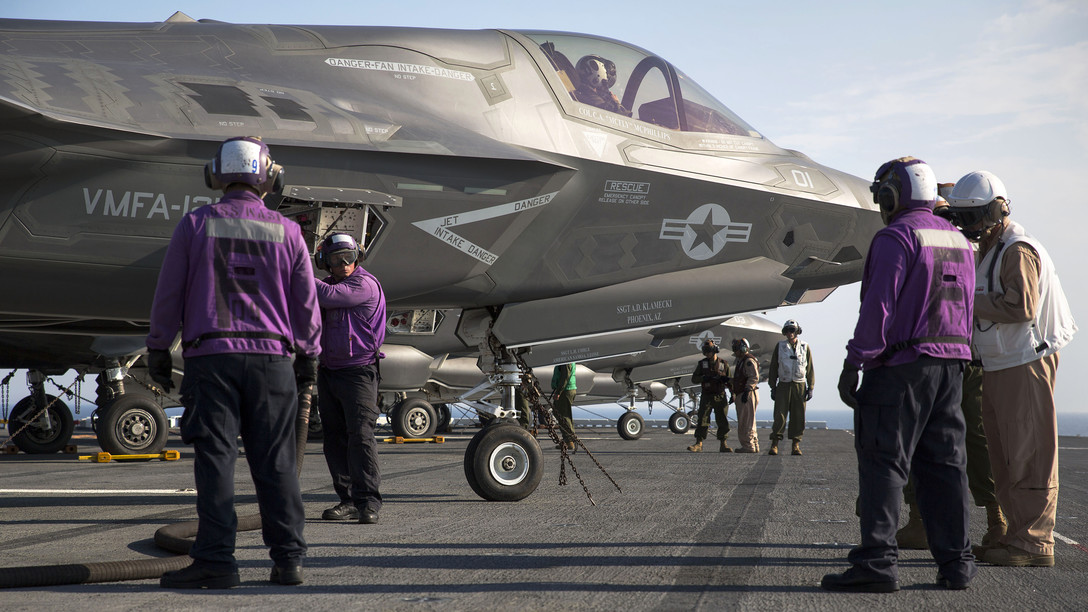
An F-35B is refueled on USS Wasp during OT-1 in 2015

To show the F-35 was sufficiently mature to deploy on a mission, known as initial operational capability to the US government, the F‑35B needed to perform well on an exercise known as Operational Test 1 (OT-1). From Tomassetti's perspective, the task was to "figure out how best to operate the airplane on the ship" which would likely be much different than with legacy aircraft. OT-1 began on May 18, 2015, aboard the USS Wasp (LHD-1), operating off the east coast of the United States, and lasted two weeks. The exercise made use of six F‑35Bs from three different USMC units, evaluated the ability to operate the aircraft at sea, and included 24-hour flight operations, interaction between ship and aircraft electronics, and use of maintenance tools. OT-1 concluded and two months later, on July 31, 2015, the USMC declared the F-35B operationally capable rejecting issues raised by critics. Tomassetti continued to work on the F-35B program through a number of key milestones including the first permanent basing of a fifth generation fighter squadron outside the United States in 2017, the first F-35B operational deployment aboard a Navy ship in 2018, and the first F‑35B combat deployment in 2019. Tomassetti retired from Lockheed Martin in 2019 as a director and F-35 Marine Corps program manager.

In April 2020, Lockheed announced that more than one thousand pilots and nine thousand maintainers had been certified by the F‑35 training system.

=== Time2Climb ===
An enthusiastic speaker, Tomassetti presented aviation topics to many diverse groups including veterans, Civil Air Patrol, and NASA. In 2016, he formed Time2Climb Consulting to assist other companies improve team performance.

== Personal life ==
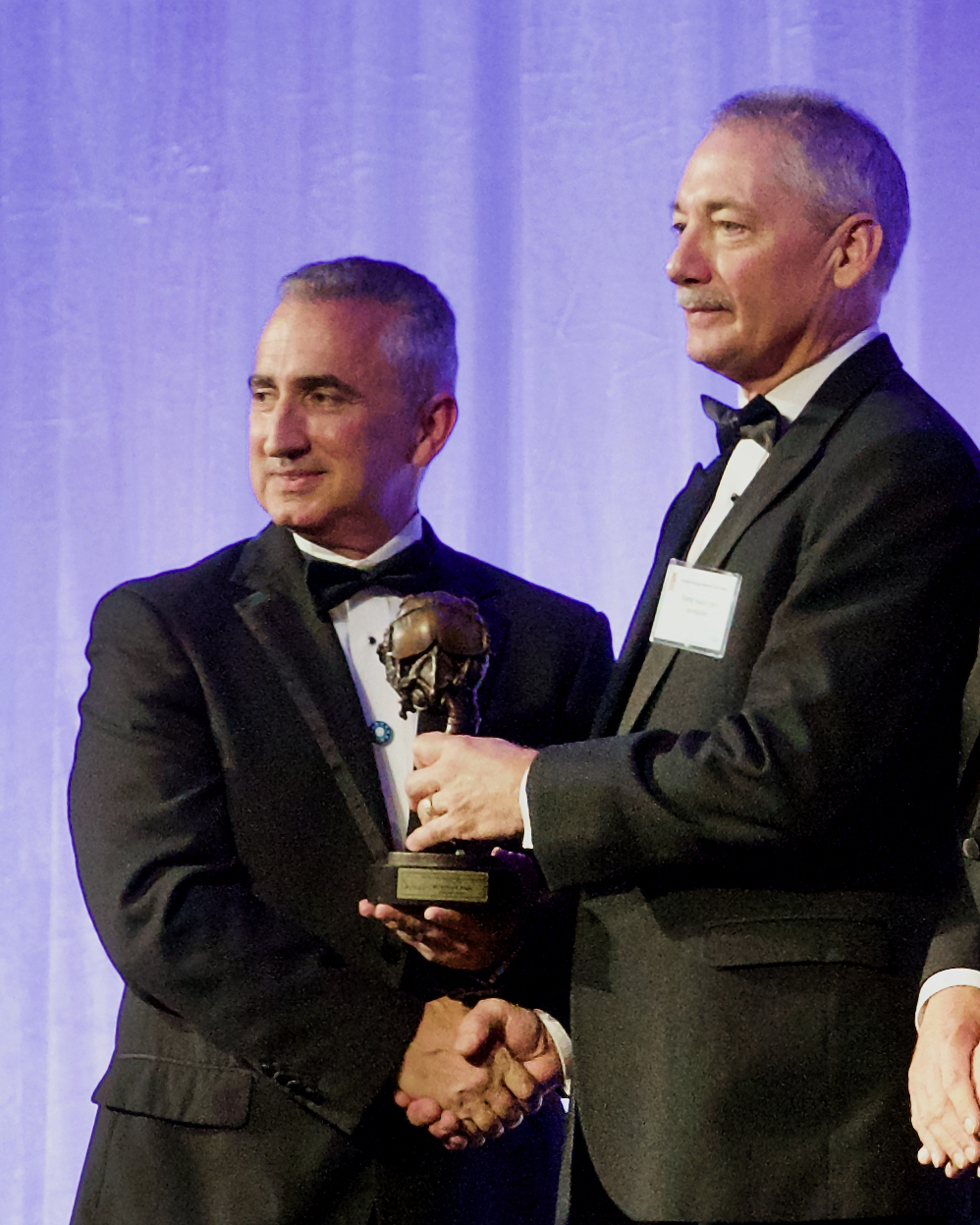
Tomassetti (left) presents the SETP Tony LeVier Flight Test Safety Award in 2018

=== Society of Experimental Test Pilots ===
In 2000, Tomassetti began a long association with the Society of Experimental Test Pilots (SETP), initially to improve his work proficiency. He enjoyed working with the organization where he presented papers and attended workshops. In 2011, he chaired the SETP 55th annual awards banquet and organized the evening's entertainment, dubbed "TURBOtainment". Tomassetti's showmanship was so well-liked that he was invited to chair the annual banquet and organize the entertainment for an additional four years.

In 2013, he was inducted as a Fellow in the society and was awarded the society's Tony LeVier Flight Test Safety Award. In 2017, Tomassetti was elected president of the society for the 2017–2018 term. His goal for the organization was to ask members to commit to a task that would make a difference—present a paper, write an article, volunteer to support an event, recruit a new member, or recover a former member.

In 2018, Tomassetti was elected to the board of directors of the Flight Test Safety Committee, an organization that promotes flight test safety and improves communication among flight test professionals. As of 2019, he has flown more than forty types of aircraft.

Tomassetti is married and has two children.

== Awards and decorations ==
Tomassetti was awarded the following decorations for his military service.

Badge	Naval Aviator Badge		
Row 1	Legion of Merit		Defense Meritorious Service Medal w/ 1 oak leaf cluster
Row 2	Meritorious Service Medal	Air Medal w/ 1 service star, Combat "V", and Strike/Flight numeral "3"	Navy and Marine Corps Commendation Medal w/ award star
Row 3	Navy and Marine Corps Achievement Medal	Navy Unit Commendation	Navy Meritorious Unit Commendation
Row 4	National Defense Service Medal w/ 1 service star	Southwest Asia Service Medal w/ 2 service stars	Global War on Terrorism Expeditionary Medal
Row 5	Navy and Marine Corps Sea Service Deployment Ribbon w/ 2 service stars	Kuwait Liberation Medal (Saudi Arabia)	Kuwait Liberation Medal (Kuwait)
Badge	Rifle Expert badge (3 awards)		Pistol Expert badge

== Effective dates of promotion ==
Tomassetti's USMC promotion dates are shown in the following table.

Promotions
Insignia	Rank	Date
	Colonel	August 1, 2007
	Lieutenant Colonel	April 1, 2002
	Major	August 1, 1996
	Captain	November 1, 1990
	First Lieutenant	April 7, 1988
	Second Lieutenant	June 13, 1986

== See also ==
- Boeing X-32
- List of United States Marine Corps aircraft squadrons
- List of United States Marines
- United States Marine Corps Aviation
