= Death to Music =

Studio album by Nightstick
- Released: June 22, 1999
- Recorded: 1998
- Genre: Sludge metal
- Length: 60:28
- Label: Relapse Records (RR 6422-2)
- Producer: Dave Shirk; Matthew F. Jacobson

Nightstick chronology
| Ultimatum (1998) | Death to Music (1999) | Rock + Roll Weymouth (2012) |

Death to Music is the third full-length album by the band Nightstick, released in 1999 on Relapse Records.

== Reception ==
The album received a three-star rating from AllMusic, which noted, "Ultra-heavy, sludgy psychedelic metal in the order of Kyuss or Monster Magnet, dominates Death to Music as it has all of Nightstick's prior releases; similarly, the group's cynically humorous observations of American society are intact as well."

== Track listing ==
All songs were written by Robert Williams.

1. "Babykiller" – 09:36
2. "Jarhead" – 03:16
3. "Young Man, Old Man" – 08:04
4. "(Won't You Take Me To) Junkytown" – 04:58
5. "The American Way" – 03:25
6. "Free Man" – 03:40
7. "In Dahmer's Room" – 11:56
8. "Boot Party Theme" – 05:36
9. "Egghead: a) 'I Am Egghead', b) Naked Came the Egg, c) Egghead Is Dead" – 09:57

== Personnel ==
- Alex Smith – vocals, bass
- Cotie Cowgill – guitars
- Robert Williams – drums, backing vocals
