= Tomasetti =

Tomasetti may refer to

- Glen Tomasetti (1929–2003), Australian singer-songwriter, author and political activist
- Lou Tomasetti (1916–2004), American football running back
- Thornton Tomasetti, an American engineering consulting firm

== See also ==
- Tomassetti, a surname
