= Tinc (retail) =

- Company type: LTD
- Industry: Stationery retail
- Founded: April 2011
- Headquarters: Corsham, Wiltshire, UK
- Number of locations: 2
- Area served: South of England

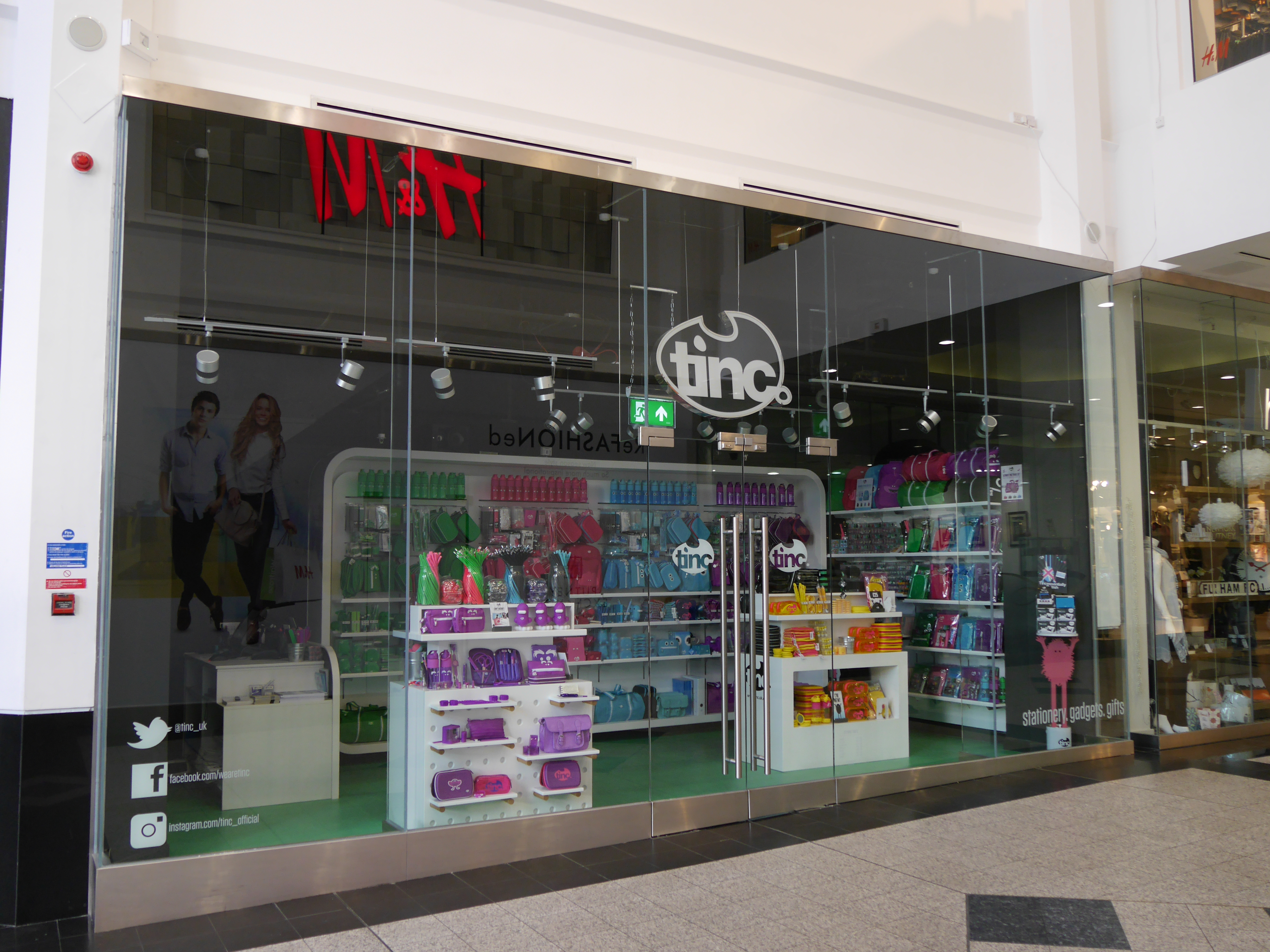
The now closed Putney Exchange Tinc in London

Tinc is a British stationery and gadgets store chain with 2 stores in the south of England. The chain also sells select lines in larger retail chains, such as John Lewis & Partners.

They opened their first shop in Bath in April 2011, and their head office is in Corsham, Wiltshire.

In 2013, they were awarded 'product business of the year' at the 2013 Startups Awards.

In April 2015, they opened in Cheltenham. In June 2015, Tinc bought seven stores from rival stationery retailer Blott which went into administration in April.
