= Nightstick (band) =

American sludge metal band

- Origin: Weymouth, Massachusetts, U.S.
- Genres: Sludge metal, noise rock
- Years active: 1992–present
- Labels: Devour, Relapse, At War with False Noise
- Members: Alex Smith; Rob Williams; Cotie Cowgill; Padoinka the Clown
- Past members: Bobby Clark; Kurt Habelt; Seth Putnam

Nightstick is an American sludge metal band from Weymouth, Massachusetts. It was formed by Siege drummer Rob Williams.

Nightstick is well known for their unique stage shows which feature a dancing clown called Padoinka. Padoinka the clown is widely considered to be the fourth member of the band and has featured heavily on the art work of all three full-length albums. Nightstick was given the key to the city of Weymouth by the mayor Sue Kay.

== Members ==
- Alex Smith – vocals, bass
- Cotie Cowgill – guitars
- Rob Williams – drums

Former members

- Bobby Clark – guitar
- Chris Joyce – Padoinka The Clown

== Discography ==
- In Dahmer's Room (1994, Devour Records)
- Blotter (1996, Relapse Records)
- Ultimatum (1998, Relapse Records)
- Death to Music (1999, Relapse Records)
- Rock + Roll Weymouth (2012, At War with False Noise)
