= Bloater =

Bloater can refer to:

- Bloater (herring), a term for herring that is smoked whole;
  - The Yarmouth Bloaters, a defunct motorcycle team named for the herring;
  - Great Yarmouth Town F.C. commonly known by the nickname The Bloaters;
- Coregonus hoyi, a freshwater whitefish from the Great Lakes;
  - Several related species of cisco from the Great Lakes, such as the kiyi
- A zombie-like enemy in The Last of Us video game, in which it is the fourth and most dangerous stage of the Cordyceps infection.
- The Bloater, a 1968 novel by Rosemary Tonks
- A "freak" zombie from the State of Decay video game series.
