= Adam Baker (motorsport) =

Australian Formula One engineer

- Born: 1974 (age 51–52)
- Education: Swinburne University of Technology - Mechanical engineering; University of Melbourne
- Occupation: Engineer
- Years active: 2002–present
- Employer: Cadillac F1 Team
- Known for: Formula One engineer
- Title: Chief operating officer

Adam Baker (born in 1974) is an Australian Formula One engineer, working as the chief operating officer of GM Performance Power Units for Cadillac's Formula One project.

== Biography ==
Baker was born in Australia in 1974. He obtained a degree in mechanical engineering at Swinburne University of Technology, followed by a postgraduate diploma in law from University of Melbourne. He started his career in 2002, and notably serving as the head of drivetrain for the BMW Sauber F1 Team from 2005 to 2009. After working as the Safety Director of the Fédération Internationale de l'Automobile (FIA), he joined Audi, responsible for setting up the engine department.

In May 2025, it was announced that Baker would leave Audi by mutual agreement. In September 2025, Cadillac announced that they had signed Baker as the chief operating officer of their power unit programme.
