= Jean-François Joseph Blot =

French politician (1781–1857)

Jean-François Joseph Blot (1781–1857) was a French soldier and politician.

== Biography ==
Blot was born in Étreux on 22 April 1781. He joined the French army. He was promoted to lieutenant and given command of a squadron of cavalry at the Battle of Austerlitz. He ended his career in the army as a general. He was colonel of the 4th Hussars during the Waterloo Campaign. With his brother, Louis-Joseph (died 1830) he founded a woollen mill in Deux-Sèvres. He was a member (representative) in the Constituent Assembly of 1848. He died in Niort on 25 December 1857.
