= Blotto (restaurant) =

Defunct pizzeria and corner market in Seattle, Washington, U.S.

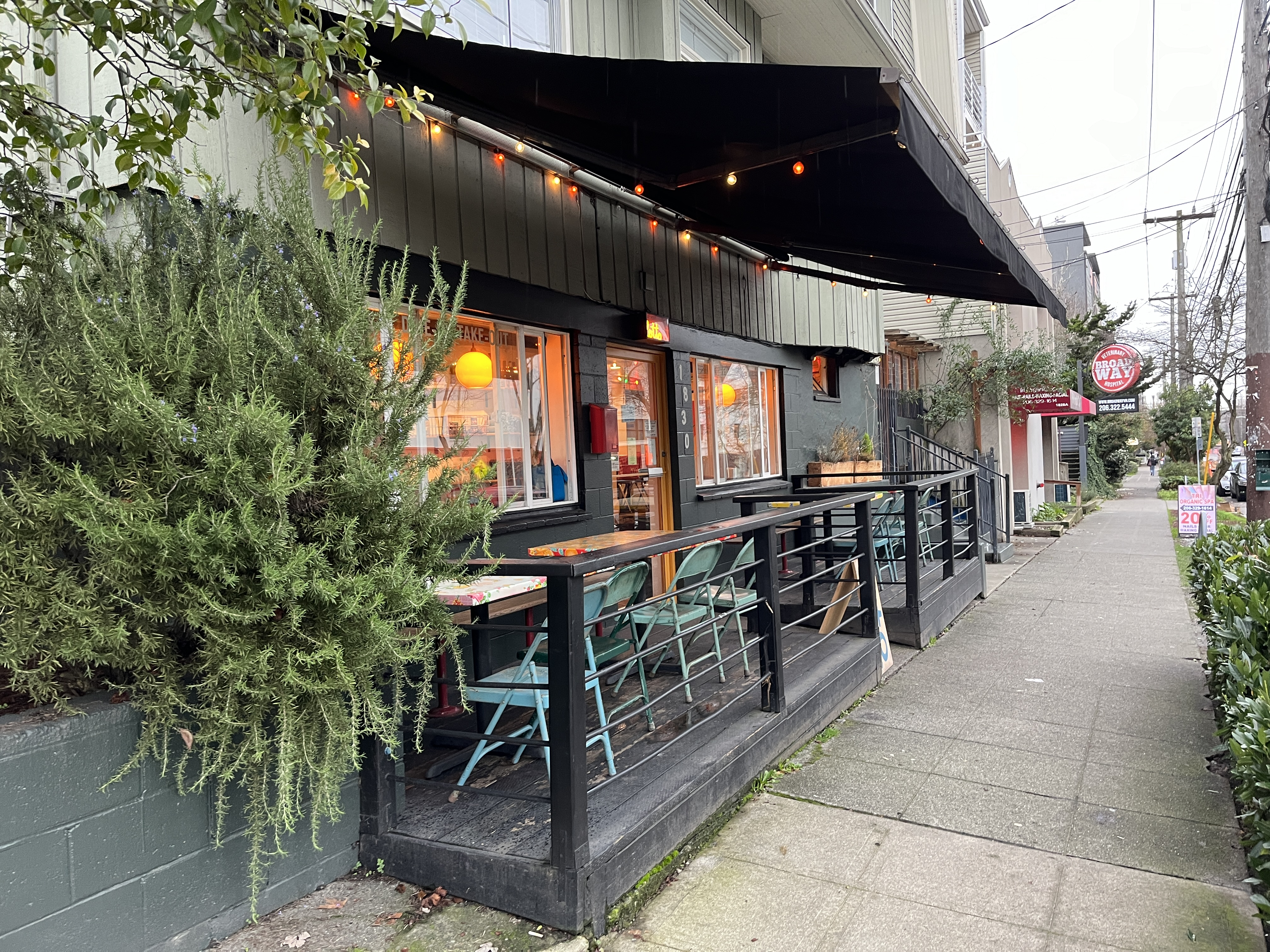
- The restaurant's exterior, 2023
- Interactive map of Blotto

Restaurant information
- Owners: Cal Hoffmann; Jordan Koplowitz
- Food type: Italian (pizza)
- Location: 1830 12th Avenue, Seattle, King, Washington, 98122, United States
- Coordinates: 47.6186°N 122.3167°W
- Website: blottoseattle.com

Blotto was a restaurant on Seattle's Capitol Hill, in the U.S. state of Washington. Cal Hoffmann and Jordan Koplowitz established the pizzeria as a pop-up in 2020, before relocating to a brick and mortar space in 2021. Despite garnering a positive reception, Blotto closed in December 2023.

== Description ==
Blotto was a pizzeria and corner market that operated in an approximately 120-year-old house at the intersection of 12th Avenue and East Denny Way on Seattle's Capitol Hill. The restaurant served New York-style pies, including cheese, pepperoni, and seasonal varieties. The menu also included a Caesar salad and a Mah Zeh burnt potato side. Blotto stocked artisinal food products and wine.

== History ==
Blotto started as a pop-up in Broadway Alley in 2020, before moving into a brick and mortar space in June 2021. In 2022, staff were challenged by working during a heat wave.

The business was owned by Cal Hoffmann and Jordan Koplowitz. In December 2023, owners announced plans to close on December 30, as the landlord intends to sell the building. During the last week of operation, the restaurant only sold pizza by the slice.

== Reception ==
Allecia Vermillion included Blotto in Seattle Metropolitan's 2021 list of the city's best new restaurants and bars.

In 2022, Aimee Rizzo of The Infatuation wrote, "Blotto's round pizza crust is a gorgeous cross between sourdough and New York-style, with a brittle crispness throughout the bottom and puffed ends that resemble pool noodles (but taste a whole lot better)." In the website's 2023 overview of the city's best pizza, she and Kayla Sager-Riley wrote, "we can definitively say that Blotto is the best slice joint in Seattle". The duo also included Blotto in a 2023 list of the best restaurants on Capitol Hill.

Eater Seattle included the business in a 2022 overview of the city's "wonderful" wine bars, and Brett Bankson called the space "vivacious". Jade Yamazaki Stewart and Meg van Huygen included Blotto in the website's 2023 list of thirteen Seattle eateries serving "perfect" pizza. In 2023, Blotto was deemed one of Seattle's 25 best restaurants by The New York Times.
