= Blotter (album) =

Studio album by Nightstick
- Released: January 1, 1996
- Recorded: 1995
- Genre: Sludge metal
- Length: 43:34
- Label: Relapse Records (6951-2)
- Producer: Dave Shirk; Matthew F. Jacobson

Nightstick chronology
In Dahmer's Room (1994)	Blotter (1996)	Ultimatum (1998)

Blotter is the first full-length studio album by the American band Nightstick, released in 1996 on Relapse Records.

It received a seven out of ten rating from Chronicles of Chaos.

== Track listing ==
No.	Title	Length
1.	"Workers of the World Unite!!"	9:56
2.	"Some Boys"	6:04
3.	"Set the Controls for the Heart of the Sun"	8:12
4.	"Mommy, What's a Funkadelic? 5/21/93"	5:44
5.	"Blotter: A. 'This Is a Pig,...', B. Only the Leaves in the Trees, C. Let's Rock! (Benedictus), D. Let's Rock (Adagio), E. Deep 6'd"	10:57
6.	"Fellating the Dying Christ"	2:41
Total length:		43:34

== Personnel ==
- Alex Smith – bass, vocals
- Cotie Cowgill – guitars
- Robert Williams – drums
