= Blottr =

Citizen journalism website based in the United Kingdom

- Website: blottr.com
- Launched: August 2010
- Current status: Offline

Blottr was a citizen journalism news website based in the United Kingdom and started in August 2010 by entrepreneur Adam Baker. Originally featuring hyperlocal news in London, the site grew to cover a total of eight UK cities: Birmingham, Bristol, Cardiff, Edinburgh, Leeds, Leicester and Manchester. In October 2011 Blottr expanded outside of the UK to Blottr France and Blottr Germany. Blottr peaked at more than 5000 contributors and more than 1.4 million unique visitors a month. Blottr was shut down in April 2014.

== Platform ==
Users who sign up for Blottr could add text, tags, videos and photos to one another's news stories in a wiki-platform. Blottr featured regular columnists whose blog posts were not able to be edited. Blottr circulated news through its website, Twitter, Facebook and a weekly digest email. In order to rate user-generated content, the site used an "authentication algorithm" which rated users based on influence, number of revisions to a story, number of contributors, and more.

In July 2011, Blottr also launched an iPhone app, Papparappzi, which allowed would-be citizen journalists to capture photos and footage of news happening around them and then easily upload it to the Blottr website.

== Business model ==
Blottr monetized by selling licensing to its crowdsourced news platform, called NewsPoint, starting in June 2011. The site secured an angel investment in May 2011 worth up to £1 million to expand its operations. The investor was Mark Pearson, founder of MyVoucherCodes.co.uk.

Contributors participated in a revenue-sharing scheme in which they received £1 for every thousand page views.

== Notable Stories ==
In May 2011, Blottr beat BBC and SkyNews by three hours in a story about a London bomb threat. During the London riots of August 2011, founder Adam Baker said the site broke the news of riots in Ealing and Woolwich before mainstream news outlets.

== Awards and recognition ==
In 2011 startups.co.uk awarded Blottr its "Innovative Business of the Year" and "Most Disruptive Business" awards at the Tech City UK Entrepreneurship festival. Startups.co.uk said in a statement that "Blottr has real potential to become a very strong digital brand name in the next few years, and is a fabulous example of British creativity and digital prowess". The 2011 Europas also gave Blottr highly commended status for media, recruitment and education.
