= Harold W. Blot =

United States Marine Corps general

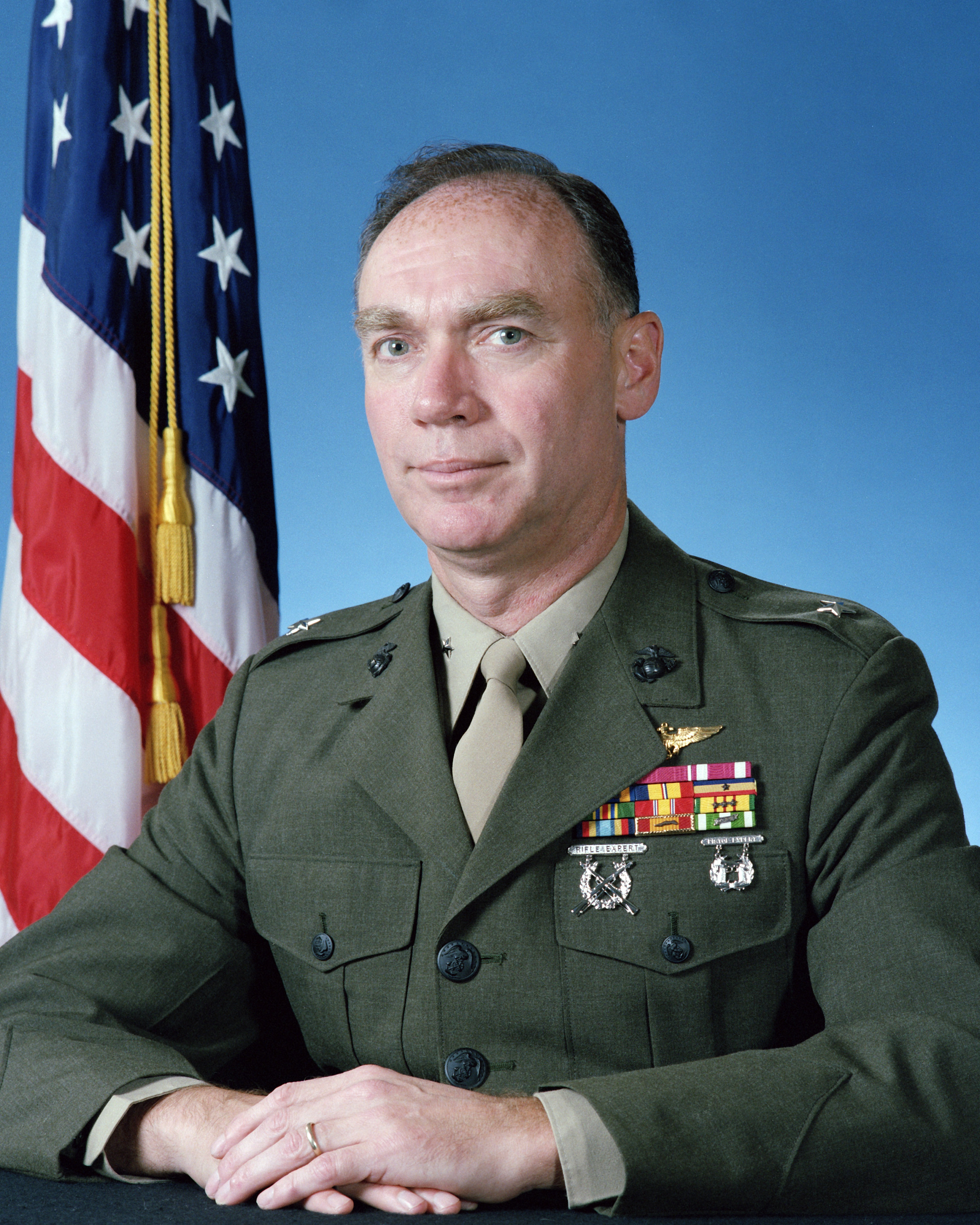
- Pictured as a brigadier general, 1988
- Born: October 10, 1938 (age 87); Manhattan, New York, U.S.
- Allegiance: United States of America
- Branch: United States Marine Corps
- Service years: 1962–1996
- Rank: Lieutenant general

Harold W. Blot (born October 10, 1938) is a retired United States Marine Corps lieutenant general who served as the Deputy Chief of Staff for Aviation. He previously served as Assistant Deputy Chief of Staff for Aviation, and Commander, 3rd Marine Aircraft Wing as a major general.
