= Nano Memory =

Memory card format created by Huawei

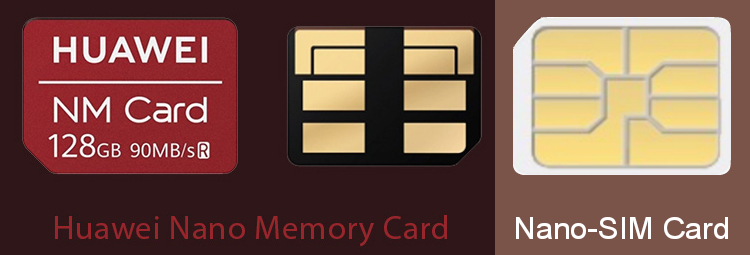
NM card

Nano Memory (NM) is a proprietary memory card format developed by Huawei in 2018.

NM cards are the same size as a nano SIM card, so they can be used in the same slots as nano SIMs. They are smaller than micro SD cards, freeing up space and reducing weight in smartphone designs.

NM cards utilize the eMMC 4.5 protocol and operate with read speeds of 90 MB/second. Because of this, there are efforts to hook them into (Micro)SD interfaces with pure passive adapters in order to access them as true MMC cards, and such adapters are already available on Chinese market. Some NM cards prove to even have boot blocks and RPMB, which are usually only present on non-removable eMMC chips.

As of 2021, the cards were only supported by Huawei phones, however they are also manufactured by Lexar. Available sizes are 64 GB, 128 GB, 256 GB, and 512 GB. They are more expensive than SD cards.

== Devices with Nano Memory support ==
As in February 2025, the following devices support Nano Memory cards:

- Huawei Mate 20/Pro/RS/X/X (5G)
- Huawei Mate 30 Series
- Huawei Mate 40 Series
- Huawei Mate 50 Series
- Huawei Mate 60 Series
- Huawei MatePad Pro
- Huawei MatePad Pro (2021)
- Huawei Nova 5/Pro/5i/5i Pro/5z
- Huawei Nova 6 SE
- Huawei Nova 7 SE 5G/SE 5G Youth/7i
- Huawei P30/Pro/Pro New Edition
- Huawei P40/4G/Pro/Pro+/lite/lite 5G
- Huawei P50 Series
- Huawei P60 Series
