= Huawei Pura =

Smartphone series by Huawei

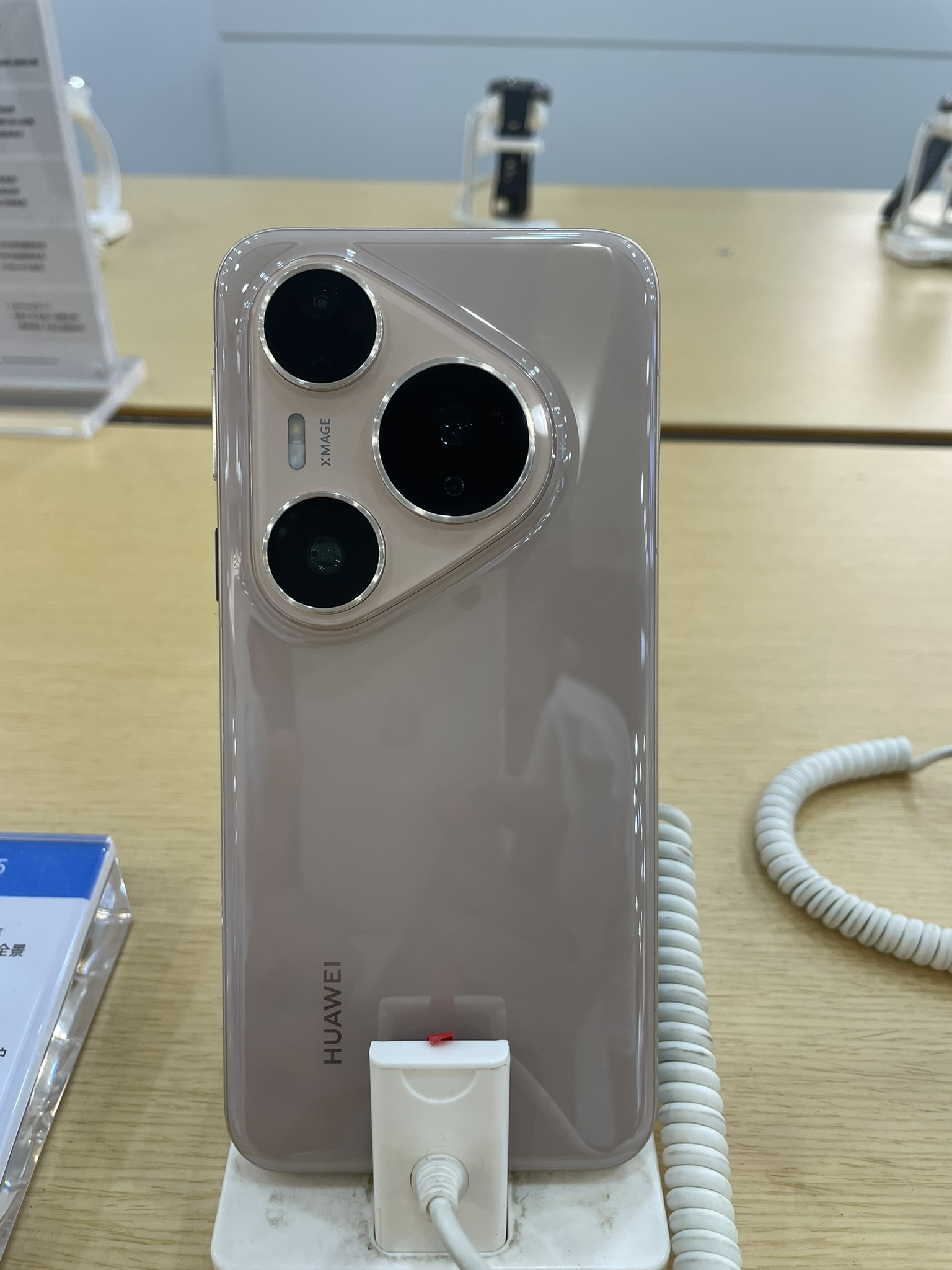
- The Huawei Pura 80 Pro in a Gold color finish
- Developer: Huawei
- Released: 2012; 14 years ago
- Operating system: Until 2019: Android; From 2019: HarmonyOS: China & Philippines first; EMUI: International (2019–2026)

The Huawei Pura series, formerly known as the P series, is a line of smartphones made by Huawei, serving as company's flagship smartphones, refining and expanding upon technologies introduced in Mate series phablet devices (which are typically positioned towards early adopters). The Pura series has featured a strong emphasis on camera functionality; and from 2016-2021, and beginning with the Huawei P9, Huawei has been in a co-engineering partnership with the German optics manufacturer Leica.

On April 15, 2024, Huawei rebranded its P series as the "Pura series", starting with the Pura 70.

== Phones ==
Huawei Pura
2012	Huawei Ascend P1
2012	Huawei Ascend P1 S
2012	Huawei Ascend P1 XL
2012	Huawei Ascend P1 LTE
2013	Huawei Ascend P2
2013	Huawei Ascend P6
2014	Huawei Ascend P6 S
2014	Huawei Ascend P7 mini
2014	Huawei Ascend P7
2015	Huawei P8 lite
2015	Huawei P8
2015	Huawei P8 Max
2016	Huawei P9 lite
2016	Huawei P9
2016	Huawei P9 Plus
2017	Huawei P8 lite 2017
2017	Huawei P9 lite 2017
2017	Huawei P10 lite
2017	Huawei P10
2017	Huawei P10 Plus
2017	Huawei P9 lite mini
2018	Huawei P20 lite
2018	Huawei P20
2018	Huawei P20 Pro
2019	Huawei P30 lite
2019	Huawei P30
2019	Huawei P30 Pro
2019	Huawei P20 lite 2019
2020	Huawei P30 lite New Edition
2020	Huawei P40 lite
2020	Huawei P40 lite 5G
2020	Huawei P40 lite E
2020	Huawei P40
2020	Huawei P40 Pro
2020	Huawei P40 Pro+
2020	Huawei P30 Pro New Edition
2021	Huawei P40 4G
2021	Huawei P50
2021	Huawei P50 Pro
2021	Huawei P50 Pocket
2022	Huawei P50E
2023	Huawei P60
2023	Huawei P60 Art
2023	Huawei P60 Pro
2024	Huawei Pura 70
2024	Huawei Pura 70 Pro
2024	Huawei Pura 70 Pro+
2024	Huawei Pura 70 Ultra
2025	Huawei Pura X
2025	Huawei Pura 80
2025	Huawei Pura 80 Pro
2025	Huawei Pura 80 Pro+
2025	Huawei Pura 80 Ultra
2026	Huawei Pura X Max
2026	Huawei Pura 90
2026	Huawei Pura 90 Pro
2026	Huawei Pura 90 Pro Max
2026	Huawei Pura 90s Pro
2026	Huawei Pura 90s Pro Max

=== Ascend P1 ===
The Huawei Ascend P1 was released on July 19, 2012, in Canada, named as the Ascend P20 lite.

=== Ascend P6 ===
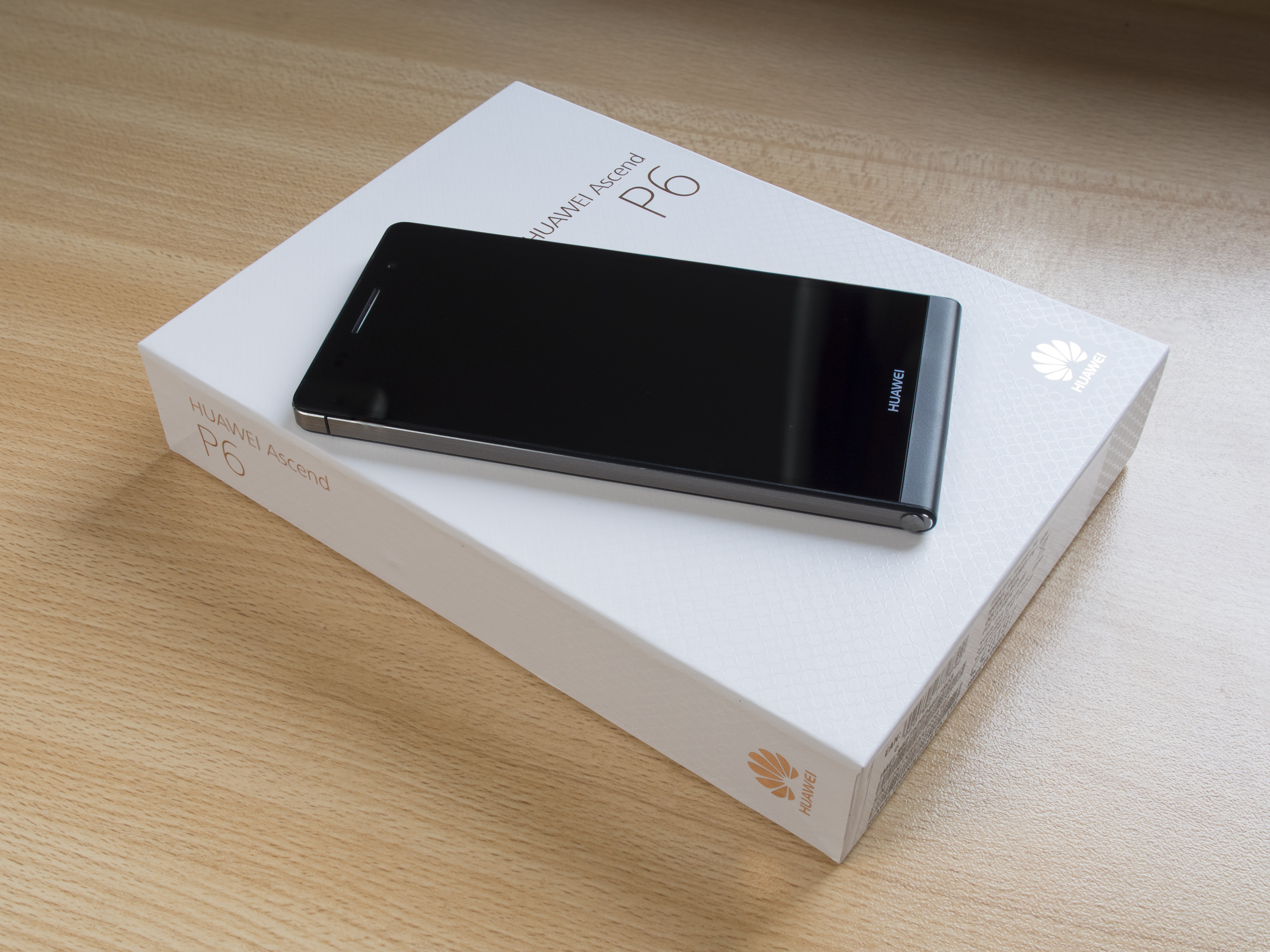
Huawei Ascend P6

Introduced in March 2013 and released in June 2013. The first smartphone with a 5 MP front camera.

=== Ascend P7 ===
The Huawei Ascend P7 was announced on May 7, 2014, and released on June 7, 2014. It was the last phone in series to carry the Ascend name.

=== P8 lite, P8 and P8 Max ===
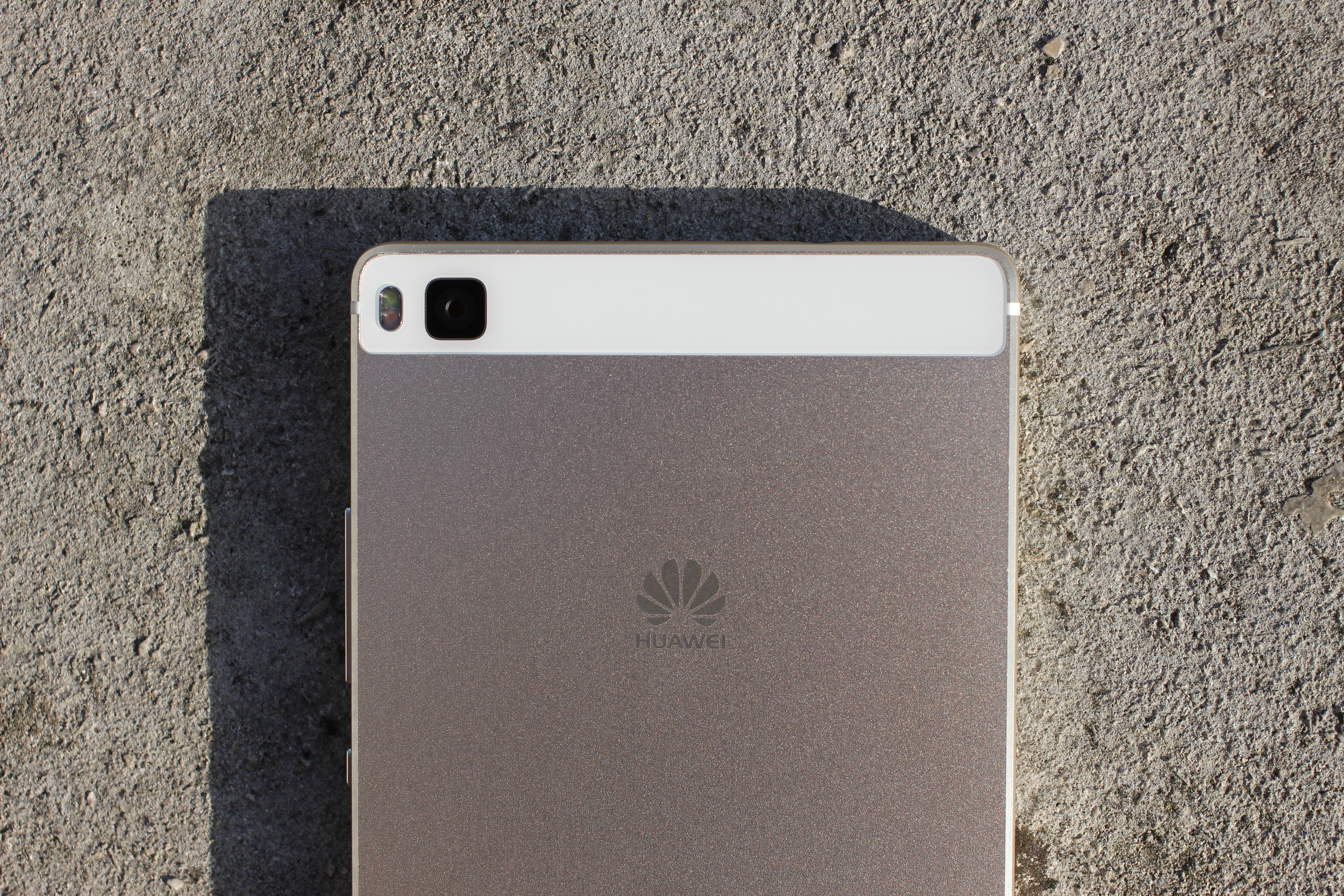
Huawei P8

The Huawei P8 was released in April 2015. The phone has a light painting function. The P8 Max was the sibling of the P8 in terms of phone size.

=== P9 lite, P9 and P9 Plus ===
The Huawei P9 and P9 Plus were the first phones from Huawei to receive a Leica Dual Camera from Leica AG, the P9 lite is the last smartphone in the series to have a single main camera. It was revealed on April 6, 2016, in Battersea Park.

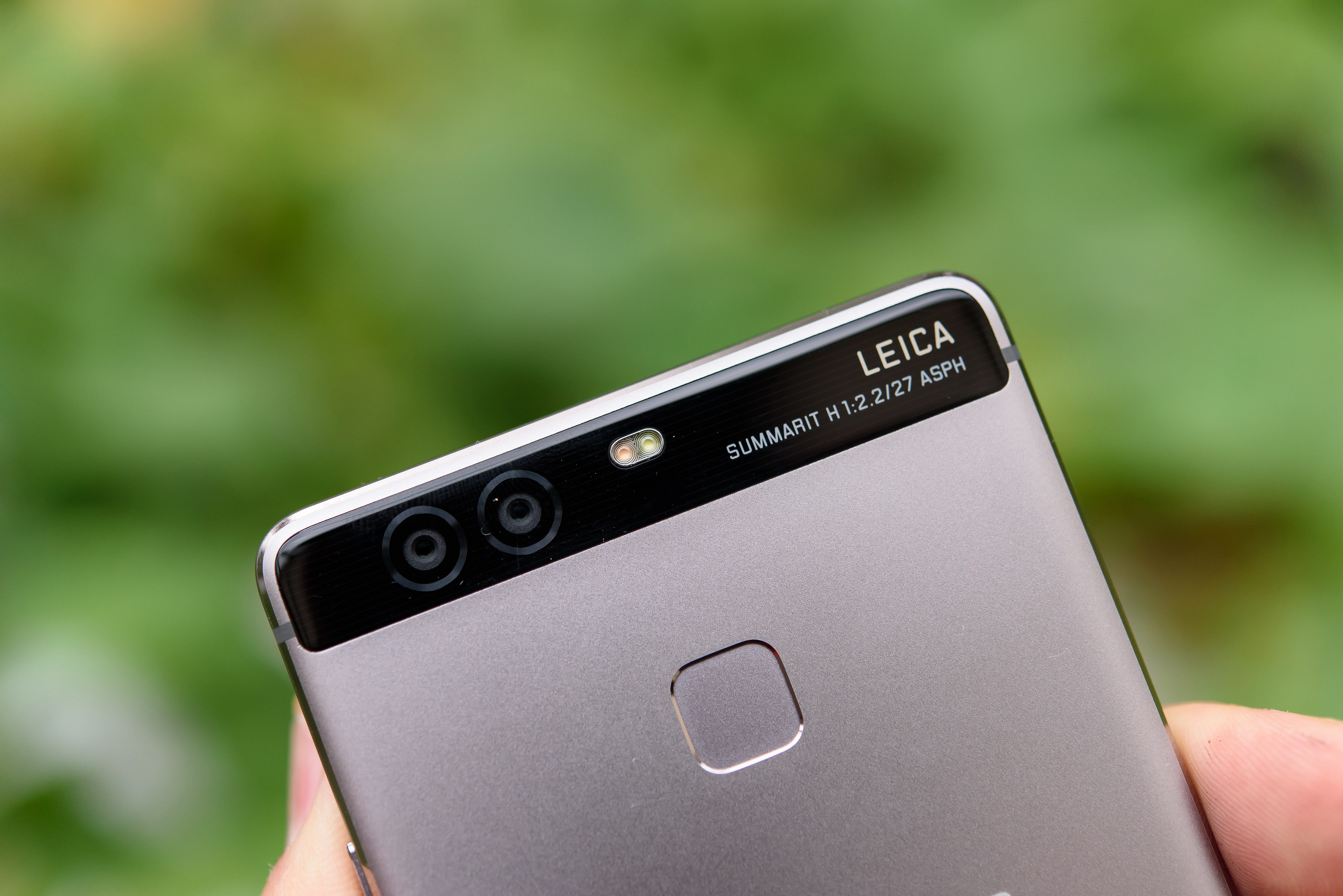
The dual rear cameras of the Huawei P9

=== P10 lite, P10 and P10 Plus ===
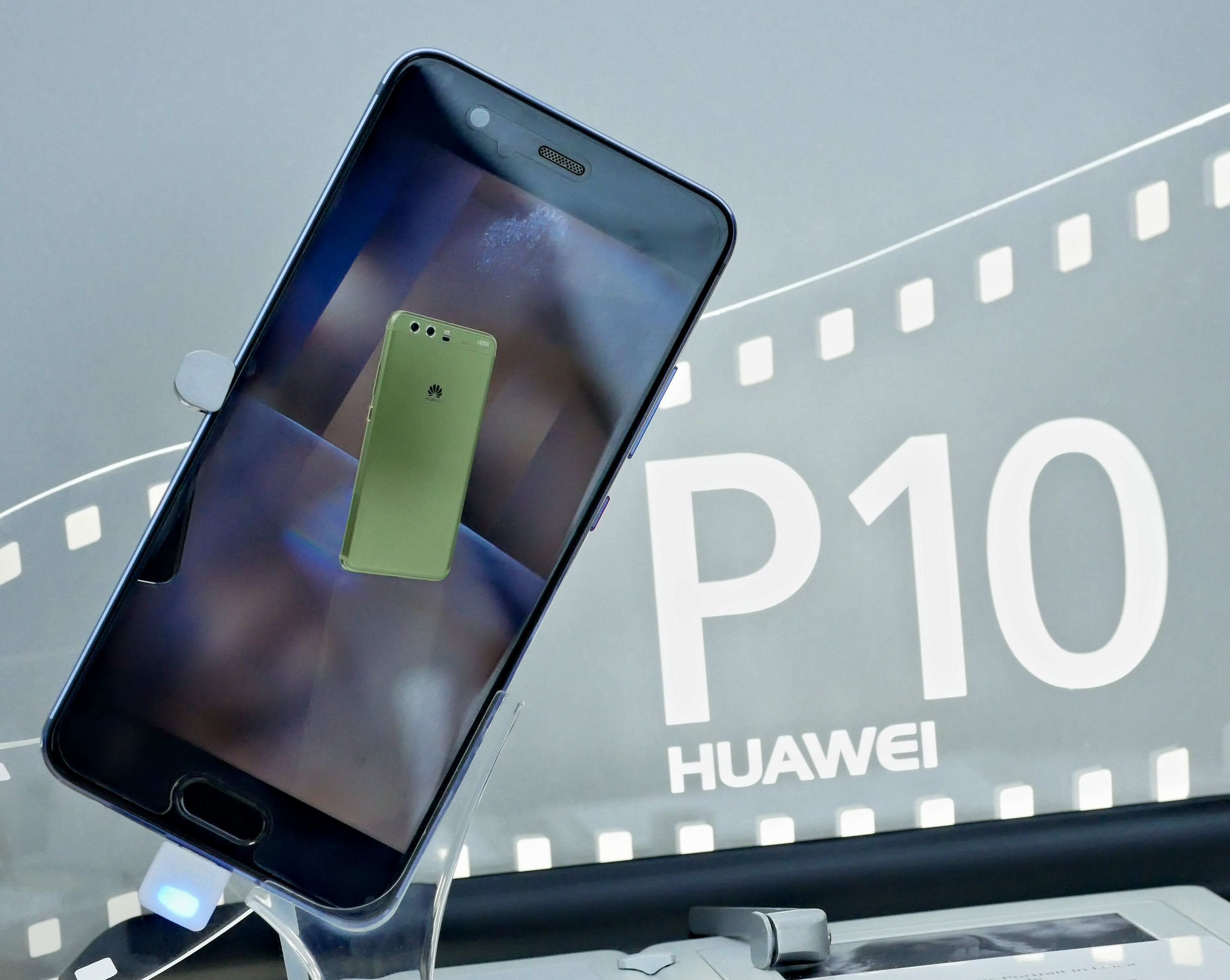
Huawei P10

The Huawei P10 and P10 Plus were launched in Mobile World Congress 2017 on February 26, 2017, at Barcelona, Spain. It has a 20-megapixel monochrome sensor and a 12-megapixel RGB, in which the camera position was retained the same as the P9. Huawei partnered with the Pantone Color Institute in implementing their Color of the Year 2017 named Pantone Greenery into the P10, including 7 more color options.

=== P20 lite, P20 and P20 Pro ===
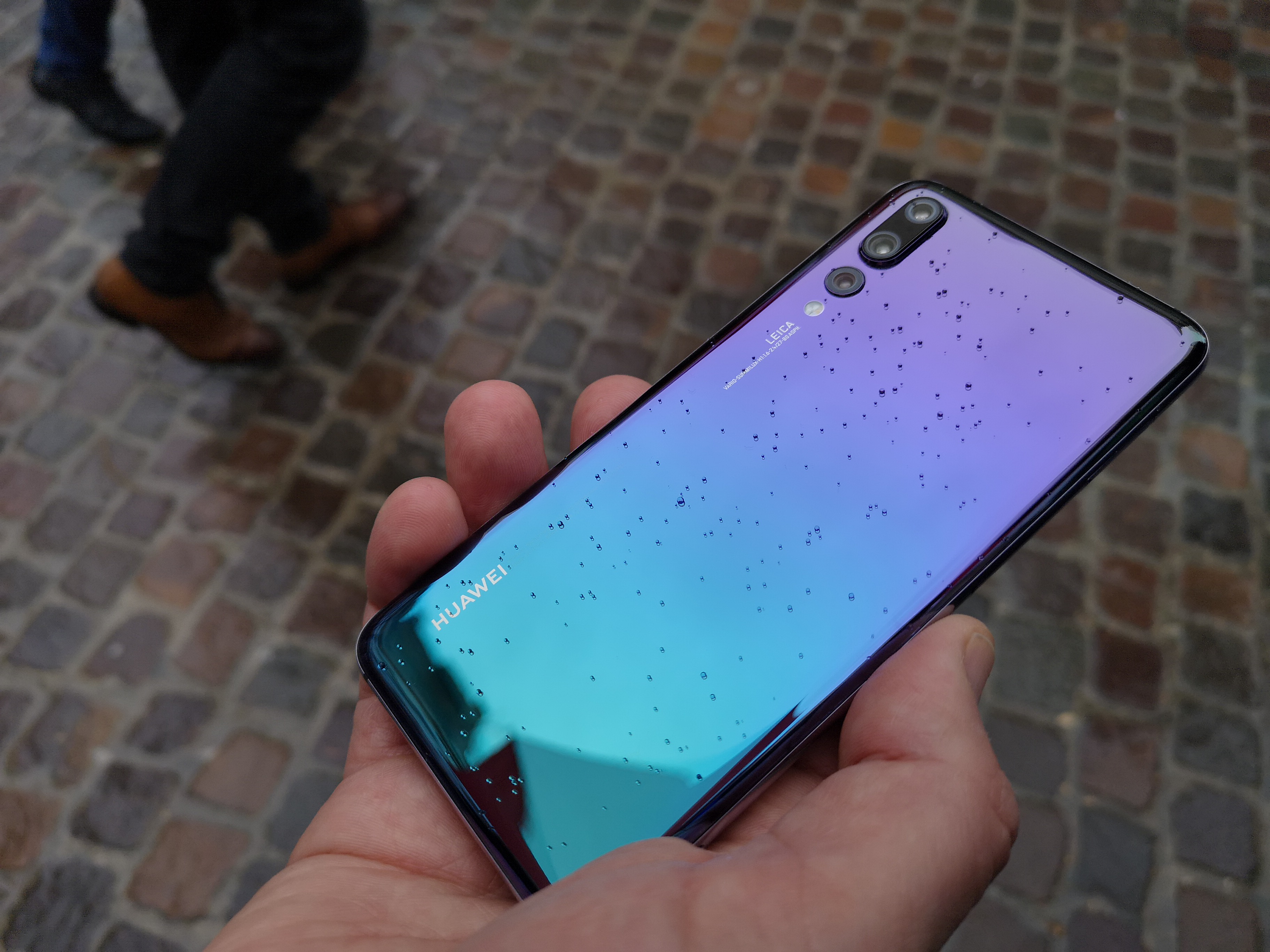
Huawei P20 Pro in "Twilight" finish

Huawei P20 and P20 Pro were launched in Huawei's Special Event in Paris on March 27, 2018. Both of them received a high rating from DXOMark, with the P20 having 102 and P20 Pro having 109. They both also have a short notch while retaining the home button for the fingerprint sensor. The pro version has a Leica triple camera setup featuring a 40 MP RGB sensor, 5× Hybrid Zoom, and an AI Scene and Object Recognition sensor capable of detecting 19 scenes.

Over 10 million Huawei P20 and P20 Pro units were sold globally.

=== P30 lite, P30 lite New Edition, P30, P30 Pro and P30 Pro New Edition ===
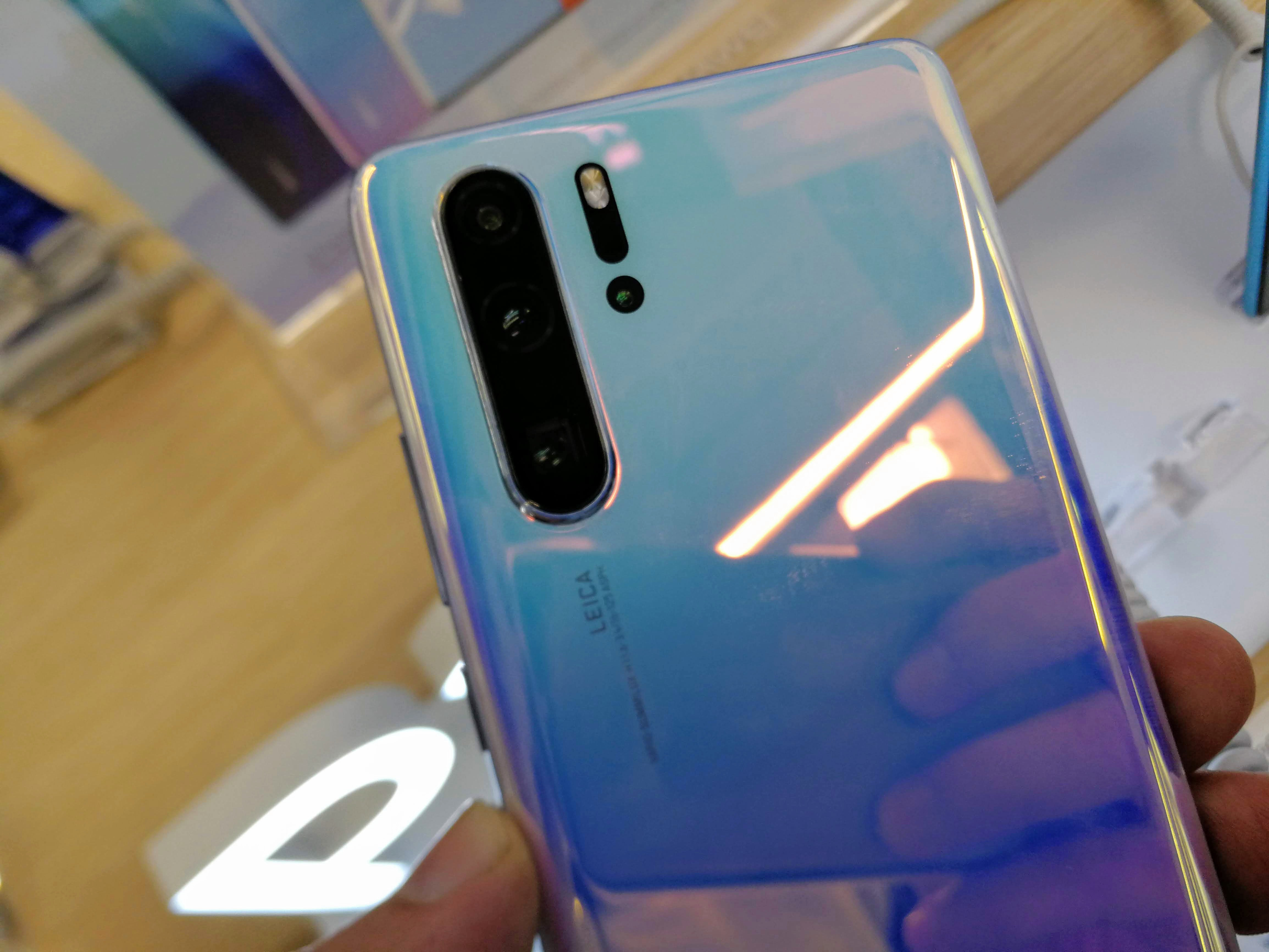
The quad-camera setup of the Huawei P30 Pro

The P30 and P30 Pro were unveiled in Paris during a media event on 26 March 2019 which features a main RYYB subpixel array (replacing green pixels for yellow) that is very sensitive to light making it able to shoot photos in very low lighting conditions. The P30 Pro has a quad-camera Leica setup which also features a telephoto camera that utilises a triangular prism (using periscope technology with lenses and a camera sensor 90° offset near the centre of the phone) reflecting light giving it the ability to have 5× optical, 10× hybrid and 50× digital zoom.

=== P40 lite, P40 lite 5G, P40 lite E, P40, P40 Pro and P40 Pro+ ===
The P40, P40 Pro and P40 Pro+ were unveiled in Paris on 26 March 2020. Some P40 models have a new 50 MP "Ultra Vision" wide sensor with Leica optics. The P40 Pro and P40 Pro+ are the first P series phones to feature a 90 Hz display and infrared face unlock. The software is also improved with a new Golden Snap feature that takes a burst of HDR+ photos and automatically picks the best shots. The P40 Pro+ has two telephoto lenses at 3× and 10× optical zoom, the latter of which is a periscope lens. These models do not have Google Mobile Services installed.

=== P50, P50E, P50 Pro and P50 Pocket ===
The latest Huawei P50 series was officially launched on July 30, 2021. This year, there are two models launched: Huawei P50 and Huawei P50 Pro, which are the first flagship smartphones of the company to run on the HarmonyOS operating system, upgraded with a new Leica camera and using a chipset. The latest flagship, Qualcomm Snapdragon 888, 4G version, which model Huawei P50 Pro have a Kirin 9000 chipset to choose from, but it supports 4G as well (not supporting 5G in both models). On March 17, 2022, Huawei launched the Huawei P50E with the Qualcomm Snapdragon 778G instead of Snapdragon 888, and it is the last Huawei phone with Leica optics.

=== P60, P60 Pro and P60 Art ===
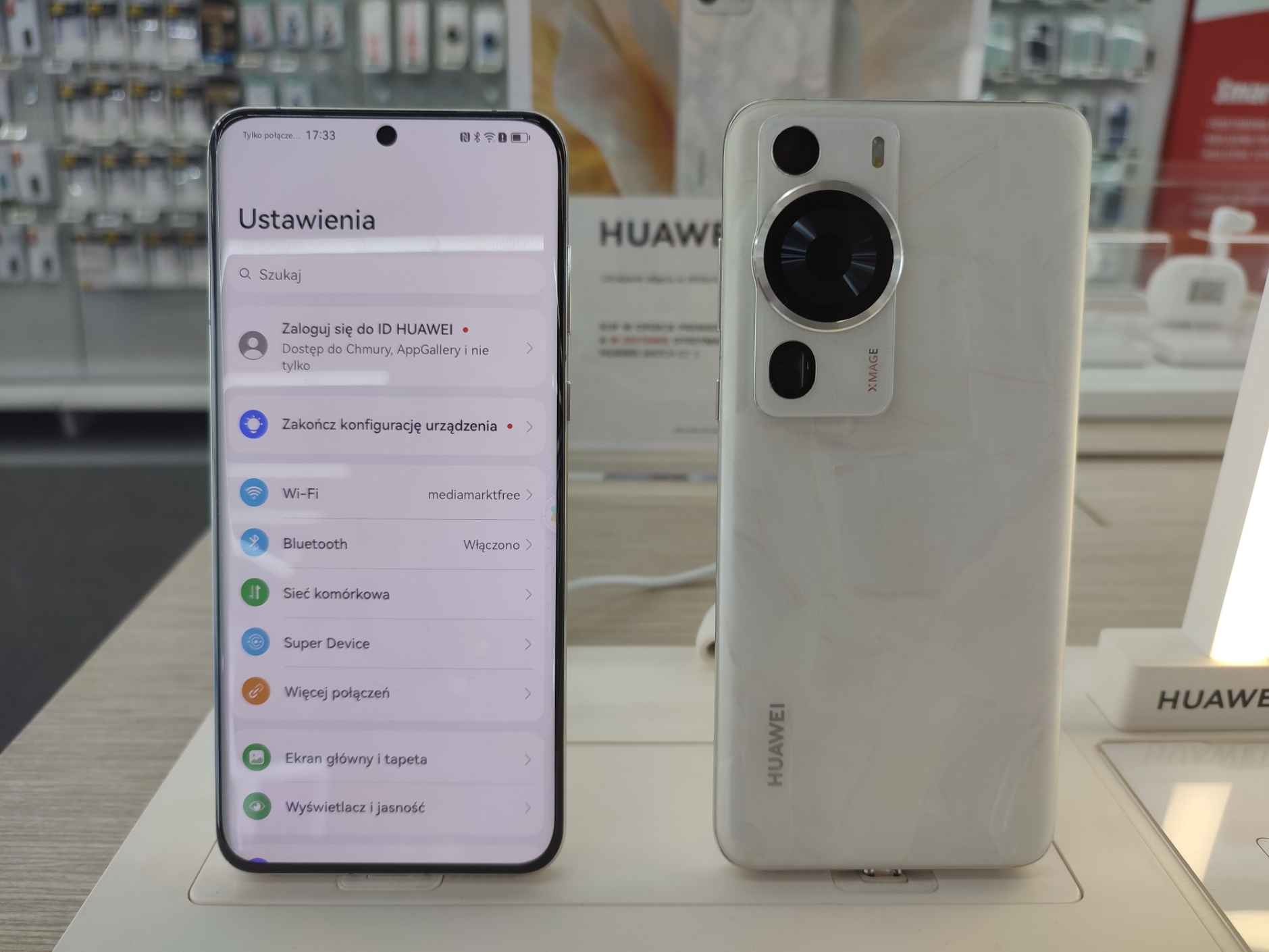
Huawei P60 Pro in Rococo Pearl

The Huawei P60, along with the Huawei P60 Pro and P60 Art, was launched on March 23, 2023 in China. In Europe, the Huawei P60 Pro was launched on May 9, 2023. According to news reports, the Huawei P60 will not be sold in the United States and Australia due to the "tech embargo". In China, the P60 was shipped with the operating system HarmonyOS 3.1 at launch; in Europe, the launch operating system was the Android-based EMUI 13.1. All P60 models were upgraded to HarmonyOS 4, starting from August 2023; in Europe, the P60 Pro was upgraded to EMUI 14.2, starting from May 2024.

=== Pura70, Pura70 Pro, Pura70 Pro+, Pura70 Ultra ===
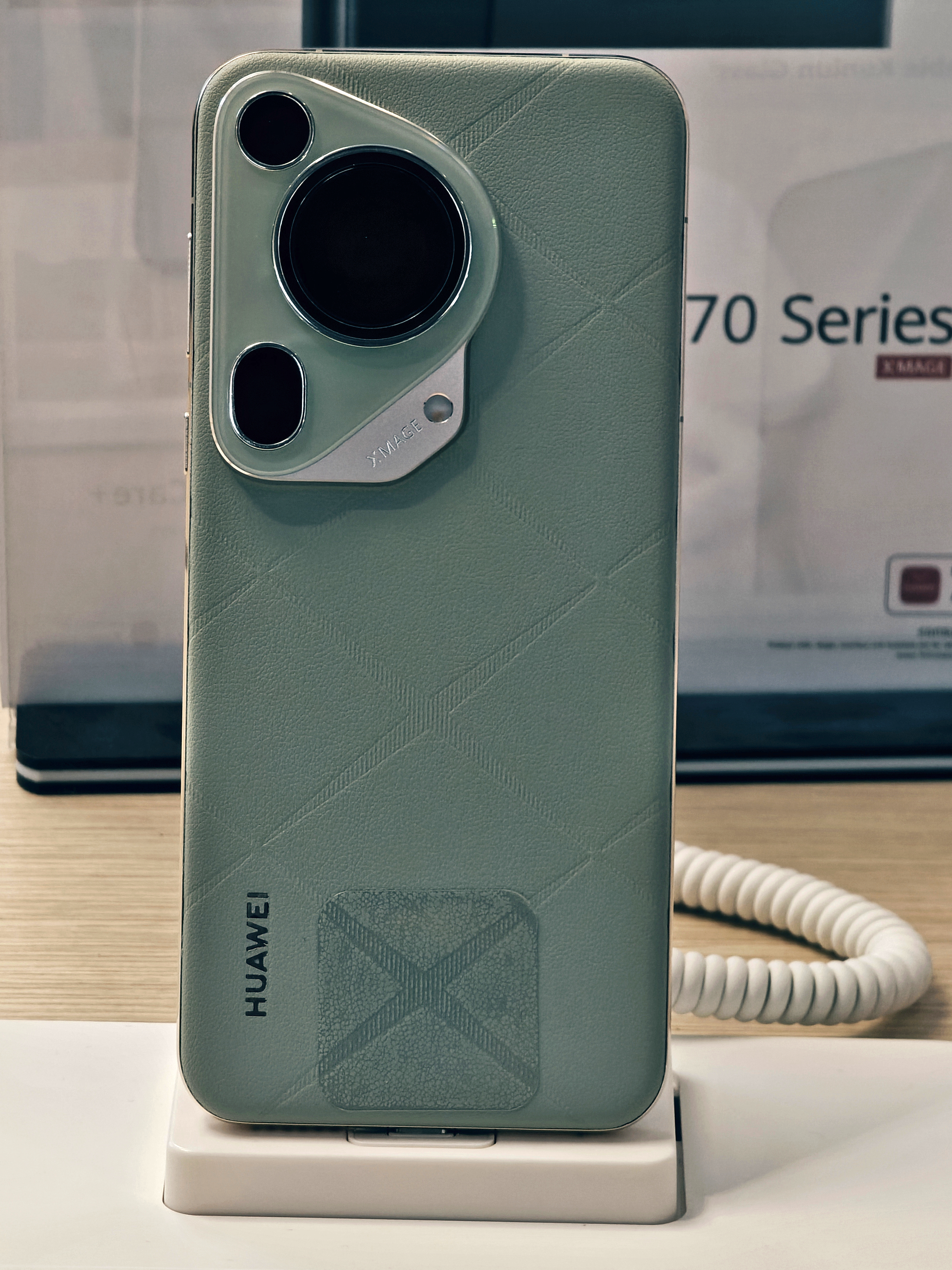
Green variant of the Huawei Pura 70 Ultra

On April 15, 2024, the Huawei P series was officially rebranded as "Huawei Pura series", ahead of the Pura70 flagship line launch. Huawei also revealed that the Pura series will have four models: Pura70, Pura70 Pro, Pura70 Pro+, Pura70 Ultra. On April 18, 2024, Huawei officially launched Pura 70, Pura 70 Pro, Pura 70 Pro+ in China for pre-order; the Pura 70 Pro and 70 Ultra version launched on April 22.

The 70 devices weigh 207 grams, and the Pro model weighs 220 grams, with 226 grams for Ultra. The Pura 70 has a 6.6-inch screen, and Pura 70 Pro, Pro+ and Ultra models offer quad-curved OLED screens with 1–120 Hz LTPO adaptive refresh rate, 1440 Hz high-frequency PWM dimming, and 300 Hz touch sampling rate.

The screen of the devices is protected with second-generation Kunlun glass. The standard Pura 70 has a 4900 mAh battery with 66 W wired charger, backward compatible. Pura 70 Pro and Pro+ have a 5050 mAh battery with 100 W wired charger, backward compatible, that is 80 W wireless-charging compatible. The Pura 70 Ultra has a 5200 mAh battery with 100 W wired charger, backward compatible, that is 80 W wireless-charging compatible.

Pro and Pro+ share the same rear XMAGE branded camera technology specifications consisting of a 50-megapixel main camera. The camera has a secondary 12.5-megapixel ultra wide-angle camera and a third 48 MP macro telephoto camera. The Ultra variant brings increased camera capabilities featuring a 1-inch sensor. The main camera in the Ultra version has 50 megapixel, 40-megapixel ultra wide-angle camera, and a 50-megapixel macro telephoto periscope camera with 100 times digital zoom. The Huawei Pura 70 series was launched with a variable aperture ranging from f/1.4 to f/4.0 in the first three models. The Ultra model has large variable aperture range of f/1.6 to f/4.0. Meanwhile, the front camera on these devices features 13 MP for selfies.

The three more expensive models, but not the Pura 70 standard model, feature NearLink communications and satellite features for messaging or calling. All models sold in Mainland China have 5G inside, models outside Mainland China have only 4G and no satellite communication. Pura 70 models launched in Mainland China also run HarmonyOS 4.2 software while EMUI 14.2 was run globally (still current in September 2024). On 28 June 2024, Huawei announced new version of Pura 70 featuring BeiDou satellite messaging and Kirin 9010E processor.

The new processors are HiSilicon Kirin 9000S1 and Kirin 9010, a purely domestic Chinese development, used in the Pura 70 were noted for their performance relative to other competitors' processors, with analysts seeing them both as "a step backward" in comparison with the "international" processors used in the 2023 Huawei P60, but also highlighting that the "fact that Huawei persevered and produced the Kirin 9010 with the [US] trade ban in place is a miracle in its own right."

According to news agency Reuters, all Pura 70 devices were out of stock at Huawei's official online store just a minute after their sale started on 18 April 2024, and hundreds of Huawei fans were said to have lined up at Huawei stores in Beijing, Shanghai and Shenzhen. Analyst Ming-Chi Kuo stated in April 2024 that the Huawei Pura 70 series could conceivably increase sales compared to the preceding Huawei P60 series by a factor of 1.5, selling more than 10 million Pura smartphones in 2024. Regardless of whether this milestone was actually reached on 31 December 2024, it was reported in 2025 that Huawei had sold a total of more than 13 million Pura 70 devices between April 2024 and July 2025 (with the successor model Pura 80 launched in June 2025).

As of late 2024, Huawei Pura 70 Ultra was the best camera phone in the world according to DXO Mark.

=== Pura X ===
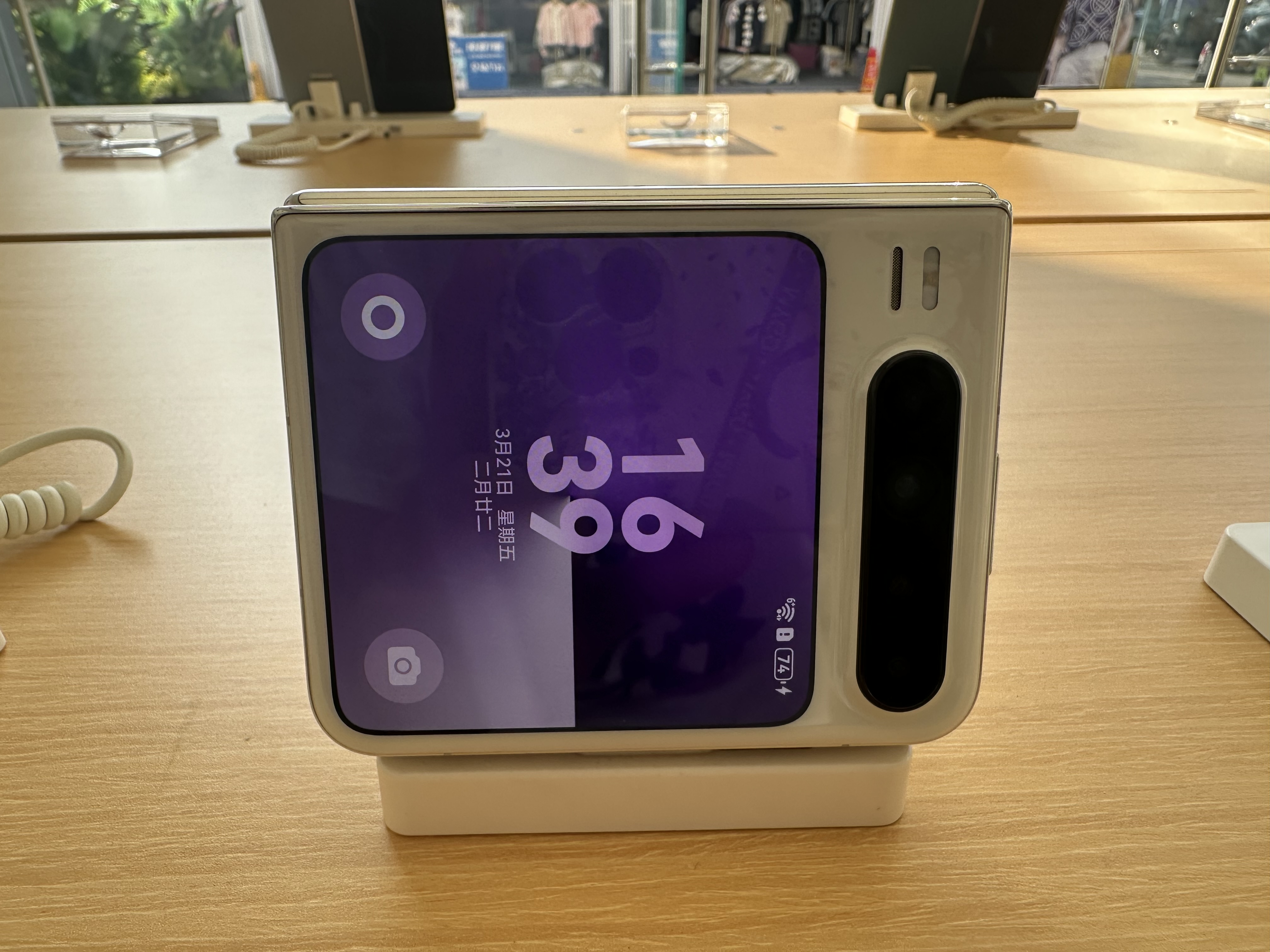
Huawei Pura X displayed at Huawei Store in China

The Huawei Pura X 16:10 wide foldable flip pocket book style phone was announced on March 20, 2025 in China that featured HarmonyOS 5.0.1 of HarmonyOS NEXT iterative software marking the first Pura series with Android-free HarmonyOS version and went on sale March 30, 2025 exclusively in China.

=== Pura80, Pura80 Pro, Pura80 Pro+, Pura80 Ultra ===
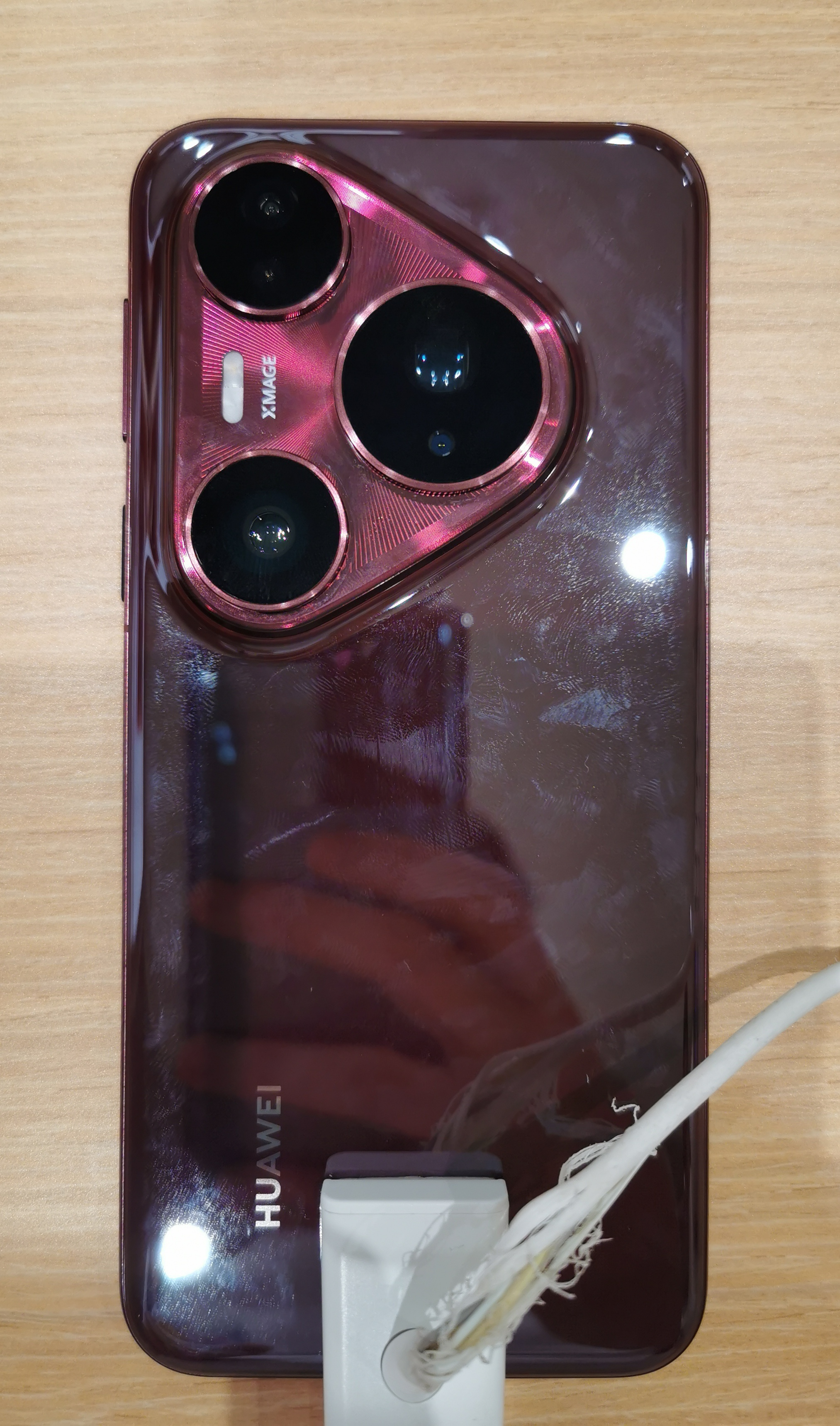
The Huawei Pura 80 Pro in Glazed Red

On 11 June 2025, Huawei launched the Huawei Pura 80 series in China with 6.8 inch screen, 1-inch main camera, a switchable telephoto lens, and the operating system HarmonyOS NEXT, amongst others. According to news reports, the first batch of Pura 80 Pro and Pro+ devices was sold out in China within ten minutes of the sales launch in the official stores and authorized online channels.

The international version of the Pura 80 series launched on 11 July 2025, with the HarmonyOS 4.3 variant of the global EMUI 15 software being utilised in Southeast Asian and African markets, followed by a launch in European (in October 2025) and Latin American markets.

=== Pura 90 Pro, Pura 90 Pro Max ===
Huawei introduced the Pura 90 Series in China on April 20, 2026, continuing the brand's legacy as a reference in smartphone photography. The lineup arrives with second generation of Huawei's True-to-Colour technology, powered by XMAGE, and pushes flagship photography further with a 200 MP periscope telephoto camera (up up to 4x optical and 100x digital zoom) built around a large sensor, alongside a 50 MP main camera featuring LOFIC technology and a variable physical aperture (f/1.4-f/4.0) for outstanding low-light and dynamic-range performance.

Beyond the cameras, the series debuts the second generation of Kunlun Glass for superior durability and the version in the Pura 90 Pro Max also includes antiglare technology. The series are powered by the new Kirin 9030S chipset with full 5G connectivity.

The international version of the lineup was unveiled on July 14, 2026, in Kuala Lumpur, Malaysia, under the names HUAWEI Pura 90s Pro and HUAWEI Pura 90s Pro Max. These models bring Huawei's latest imaging innovations to global markets, together with the return of 5G, eSIM support and Wi-Fi 7 connectivity.

The "s" added to the series in intended solely to distinguish it from its Chinese launch version, which was released as the Pura 90 Pro Max, while the international version was named Pura 90s Series.

== See also ==
- Huawei Mate series
- Samsung Galaxy S series
- LG G series
