= Huawei P40 lite 5G =

Huawei smartphone introduced in 2020

Huawei P40 lite 5G (Huawei Nova 7 SE) Huawei Nova 7 SE 5G Youth
- Brand: Huawei
- Manufacturer: Huawei
- Type: Smartphone
- Series: Huawei P / Nova
- First released: Nova 7 SE: April 23, 2020; P40 lite 5G: May 15, 2020; Nova 7 SE 5G Youth: October 16, 2020
- Predecessor: Huawei Nova 6 SE
- Successor: Huawei Nova 8 SE; Huawei Nova 8 SE Youth
- Related: Huawei P40, Huawei P40 lite, Huawei P40 lite E, Huawei Nova 7
- Compatible networks: GSM, 3G, 4G (LTE), 5G
- Form factor: Slate
- Dimensions: 162.3×75×8.6 mm (6.39×2.95×0.34 in)
- Weight: 189 g (7 oz)
- Operating system: Initial: Android 10 with EMUI 10.1; Current: P40 lite 5G: Android 11 with EMUI 12; Nova 7 SE & 7 SE 5G Youth: HarmonyOS 2.0; Without Google Play Services
- CPU: P40 lite 5G: Kirin 820 5G (7 nm), 8 cores (1×2.36 GHz Cortex-A76 & 3×2.22 GHz Cortex-A76 & 4×1.84 GHz Cortex-A55); Nova 7 SE 5G Youth: MediaTek Dimensity 800U 5G (7 nm), 8 cores (2×2.4 GHz Cortex-A76 & 6×2.0 GHz Cortex-A55)
- GPU: P40 lite 5G: Mali-G57 (6 cores); Nova 7 SE 5G Youth: Mali-G57 MC3
- Memory: P40 lite 5G: 6 GB; Nova 7 SE: 6/8 GB; Nova 7 SE 5G Youth: 8 GB; LPDDR4X
- Storage: P40 lite 5G & Nova 7 SE 5G Youth: 128 GB; Nova 7 SE: 128/256 GB; UFS 2.1
- Removable storage: P40 lite 5G: NM (Nano Memory) up to 256 GB; Nova 7 SE 5G Youth: None
- Battery: Non-removable Li-Po 4000 mAh
- Charging: 40W fast charging, 5W reverse charging
- Rear camera: 64 MP Sony IMX686, f/1.8, 26 mm (wide), PDAF + 8 MP, f/2.4, 17 mm (ultrawide) + 2 MP, f/2.4 (macro) + 2 MP, f/2.4 (depth sensor); LED flash, HDR, panorama Video: 4K@30fps, 1080p@30fps, 720p@960fps
- Front camera: 16 MP, f/2.0 (wide); HDR; Video: 1080p@30fps
- Display: LTPS IPS LCD, 6.5", 2400 × 1080 pixels (FullHD+), 20:9 ratio, 405 ppi, HDR10
- Connectivity: USB-C 2.0, Bluetooth 5.1 (A2DP, LE), NFC (P40 lite 5G), Wi-Fi 802.11 a/b/g/n/ac (dual-band, Wi-Fi Direct, hotspot), GPS, A-GPS, GLONASS, BDS, GALILEO
- Other: Side-mounted fingerprint scanner (integrated into power button), proximity sensor, ambient light sensor, accelerometer, gyroscope, compass

The Huawei P40 lite 5G is a smartphone developed by Huawei. It is an alternate variant of the Huawei P40 lite, adding support for 5G network connectivity. It was officially announced on May 15, 2020 in Europe. In certain markets, the smartphone is distributed under the name Huawei Nova 7 SE. On October 16, 2020, the Huawei Nova 7 SE 5G Youth was announced in China as a lower-tier version of the Nova 7 SE.

The Nova 7 SE was released in the Philippines on June 8, 2020.

== Design ==
The front display panel is constructed from glass, while the unibody shell is made of glossy plastic.

The bottom edge houses a USB-C port, speaker, microphone, and a 3.5 mm audio jack. A secondary microphone sits at the top edge. The left side holds the SIM tray, configuration depending on the variant: a dual SIM card slot on the Nova 7 SE 5G Youth, or a dual SIM plus Nano Memory card slot (up to 256 GB) on the P40 lite 5G. The right side features the volume rocker controls and a power button integrated with a capacitive fingerprint sensor.

- The Huawei P40 lite 5G is available in three colors: Midnight Black, Space Silver, and Crush Green.
- The Huawei Nova 7 SE and Nova 7 SE 5G Youth are available in four colors: Midnight Black, Space Silver, Midsummer Purple, and Crush Green.

== Specifications ==
=== Hardware ===
The Huawei P40 lite 5G is powered by a Kirin 820 5G processor alongside a Mali-G57 GPU.

The Huawei Nova 7 SE 5G Youth features a MediaTek Dimensity 800U 5G chip configured with a Mali-G57 MC3 GPU.

=== Battery ===
The internal hardware is sustained by a non-removable 4000 mAh battery pack. It supports 40W wired fast charging capabilities alongside a 5W reverse wired charging standard.

=== Camera ===
The smartphones feature a rear quad-camera layout comprising a 64 MP main sensor (f/1.8, wide lens) with phase-detection autofocus (PDAF), an 8 MP ultrawide lens (f/2.4), a 2 MP macro sensor (f/2.4), and a 2 MP depth sensor (f/2.4). The rear setup supports video recording at up to 4K at 30fps. The front-facing selfie camera features a 16 MP sensor (f/2.0, wide lens) supporting up to 1080p video capture at 30fps.

=== Display ===
The device uses a 6.5-inch LTPS IPS LCD panel featuring a FullHD+ resolution of 2400 × 1080 pixels. It is characterized by a 20:9 aspect ratio, a pixel density of ~404 ppi, and a circular punch-hole cutout for the front camera located in the upper left corner.

=== Memory and storage configurations ===
- Huawei P40 lite 5G - Available in a 6 GB RAM / 128 GB storage configuration.
- Huawei Nova 7 SE - Available in 6 GB / 128 GB, 8 GB / 128 GB, and 8 GB / 256 GB hardware variants.
- Huawei Nova 7 SE 5G Youth - Available in 8 GB / 256 GB and 8 GB / 512 GB configurations.

=== Software ===
The devices originally shipped with EMUI 10 layered over Android 10, notably omitting Google Play Services. App installations are facilitated through the ecosystem proprietary app catalog, Huawei AppGallery.

The Huawei P40 lite 5G was subsequently updated to EMUI 12 based on Android 11, whereas Chinese regional Nova 7 SE and 7 SE 5G Youth variants received updates upgrading them to HarmonyOS 2.0.
