= Huawei Pura 70 =

2024 flagship smartphone by Huawei

Huawei Pura 70 Huawei Pura 70 Pro Huawei Pura 70 Pro+ Huawei Pura 70 Ultra
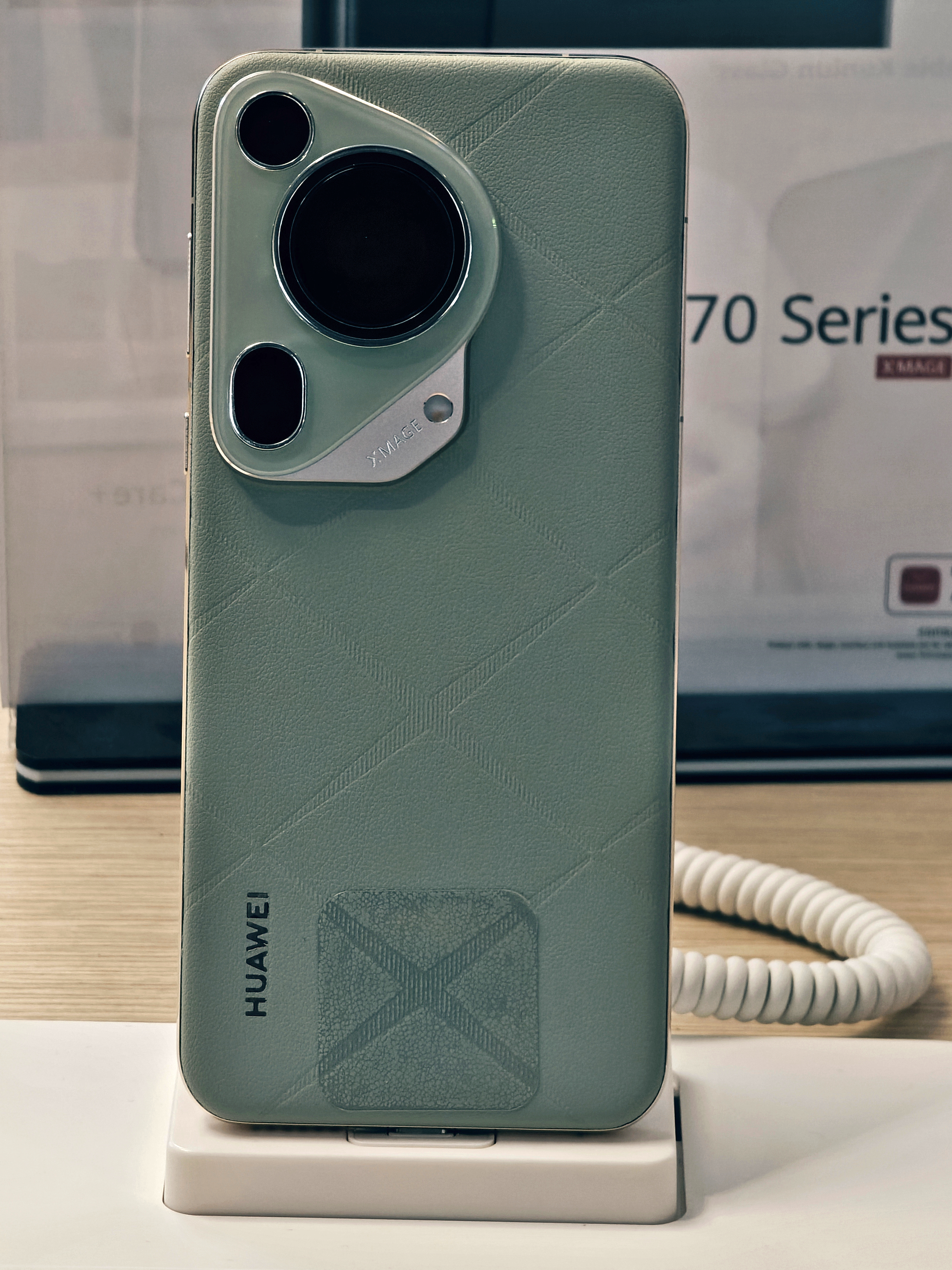
- Green variant of the Huawei Pura 70 Ultra
- Manufacturer: Huawei
- Type: Smartphone
- Series: Huawei Pura
- First released: April 18, 2024; 2 years ago
- Predecessor: Huawei Pura 60
- Successor: Huawei Pura 80
- Compatible networks: 2G, 3G, 4G, 5G
- Operating system: China: HarmonyOS 4.2; International: EMUI 14.2

The Huawei Pura 70 is a series of Android-based flagship smartphones manufacutred, designed, and produced by Huawei as part of the Pura series.

The series consists of four models: Pura70, Pura70 Pro, Pura70 Pro+, and the Pura70 Ultra. On April 15, 2024, the Huawei P series was officially rebranded as "Huawei Pura series", ahead of the Pura70 flagship line launch. On April 18, 2024, Huawei officially launched the Pura 70, Pura 70 Pro, Pura 70 Pro+ in China for pre-order; the Pura 70 Pro and 70 Ultra version launched on April 22.

== Specifications ==
The Pura 70 devices weigh 207 grams, and the Pro model weighs 220 grams, with 226 grams for Ultra. The Pura 70 has a 6.6-inch screen, and Pura 70 Pro, Pro+ and Ultra models offer quad-curved OLED screens with 1-120 Hz LTPO adaptive refresh rate, 1440 Hz high-frequency PWM dimming, and 300 Hz touch sampling rate.

The screen of the devices is protected with second-generation Kunlun glass. The standard Pura 70 has a 4900 mAh battery with 66 W wired charger, backward compatible. Pura 70 Pro and Pro+ have a 5050 mAh battery with 100 W wired charger, backward compatible, that is 80 W wireless-charging compatible. The Pura 70 Ultra has a 5200 mAh battery with 100 W wired charger, backward compatible, that is 80 W wireless-charging compatible.

Pro and Pro+ share the same rear XMAGE branded camera technology specifications consisting of a 50-megapixel main camera. The camera has a secondary 12.5-megapixel ultra wide-angle camera and a third 48 MP macro telephoto camera. The Ultra variant brings increased camera capabilities featuring a 1-inch sensor. The main camera in the Ultra version has 50 megapixel, 40-megapixel ultra wide-angle camera, and a 50-megapixel macro telephoto periscope camera with 100 times digital zoom. The Huawei Pura 70 series was launched with a variable aperture ranging from f/1.4 to f/4.0 in the first three models. The Ultra model has large variable aperture range of f/1.6 to f/4.0. Meanwhile, the front camera on these devices features 13 MP for selfies.

The three more expensive models, but not the Pura 70 standard model, feature NearLink communications and satellite features for messaging or calling. All models sold in Mainland China have 5G inside, models outside Mainland China have only 4G and no satellite communication. Pura 70 models launched in Mainland China also run HarmonyOS 4.2 software while EMUI 14.2 was run globally (still current in September 2024). On 28 June 2024, Huawei announced new version of Pura 70 featuring BeiDou satellite messaging and Kirin 9010E processor.

The new processors are HiSilicon Kirin 9000S1 and Kirin 9010, a purely domestic Chinese development, used in the Pura 70 were noted for their performance relative to other competitors' processors, with analysts seeing them both as "a step backward" in comparison with the "international" processors used in the 2023 Huawei P60, but also highlighting that the "fact that Huawei persevered and produced the Kirin 9010 with the [US] trade ban in place is a miracle in its own right."

According to news agency Reuters, all Pura 70 devices were out of stock at Huawei's official online store just a minute after their sale started on 18 April 2024, and hundreds of Huawei fans were said to have lined up at Huawei stores in Beijing, Shanghai and Shenzhen. Analyst Ming-Chi Kuo stated in April 2024 that the Huawei Pura 70 series could conceivably increase sales compared to the preceding Huawei P60 series by a factor of 1.5, selling more than 10 million Pura smartphones in 2024. Regardless of whether this milestone was actually reached on 31 December 2024, it was reported in 2025 that Huawei had sold a total of more than 13 million Pura 70 devices between April 2024 and July 2025 (with the successor model Pura 80 launched in June 2025).

As of late 2024, Huawei Pura 70 Ultra was the best camera phone in the world according to DXO Mark.
