= Huawei P10 Lite =

2017 Huawei smartphone

Huawei P10 lite (Huawei Nova Youth in China)
- Manufacturer: Huawei
- Type: Smartphone
- Series: Huawei P/Nova
- First released: March 17, 2017; 9 years ago
- Predecessor: Huawei P9 lite
- Successor: Huawei P20 lite
- Related: Huawei P10; Huawei P10 Plus; Huawei Nova
- Compatible networks: GSM, 3G, LTE
- Form factor: Slate
- Colors: Graphite Black, Pearl White, Platinum Gold, Sapphire Blue
- Dimensions: 146.5×72×7.2 mm (5.77×2.83×0.28 in)
- Weight: 146 g (5 oz)
- Operating system: Original: Android 7.0 Nougat + EMUI 5.1; Current: Android 8.0 Oreo + EMUI 8
- System-on-chip: Kirin 658 (16 nm)
- CPU: Octa-core (4×2.1 GHz Cortex-A53 & 4×1.7 GHz Cortex-A53)
- GPU: Mali-T830 MP2
- Memory: 3/4 GB LPDDR3
- Storage: 32/64 GB eMMC 5.1
- Removable storage: microSDXC up to 256 GB
- SIM: Single SIM (Nano-SIM) or Hybrid Dual SIM (Nano-SIM)
- Battery: Non-removable, Li-Po 3000 mAh, 18 W fast charging
- Rear camera: 12 MP, f/2.2, 1/2.8", 1.25 μm, PDAF; LED flash, HDR, panorama Video: 1080p@30fps
- Front camera: 8 MP, f/2.0, AF; Video: 1080p@30fps
- Display: LTPS LCD, 5.2", 1920 × 1080 (FullHD), 16:9, 424 ppi
- Connectivity: MicroUSB 2.0, 3.5 mm audio, Bluetooth 4.1 (A2DP, EDR, LE), NFC, FM radio, Wi-Fi 802.11 a/b/g/n/ac (dual-band, Wi-Fi Direct, hotspot), GPS, A-GPS, GLONASS, BeiDou
- Data inputs: Fingerprint scanner (rear-mounted), proximity sensor, ambient light sensor, accelerometer, gyroscope, compass, Hall sensor
- Codename: Warsaw

The Huawei P10 lite is an Android smartphone developed and manufactured by Huawei, which is a simplified version of the Huawei P10, introduced on March 17, 2017. In China, the smartphone is sold as Huawei Nova Youth.

It was modeled as WAS-LX1, WAS-LX2, WAS-LX3, WAS-LX1A, WAS-LX2J, and WAS-L03T, and WAS-AL00 and WAS-TL10 for the Nova Youth.

== Specifications ==
=== Design ===
The back panel and screen are made of glass and the side frame is made of aluminum.

On the bottom, there is a microUSB connector, a speaker, and a microphone. On the top, there is a 3.5 mm audio jack and a second microphone. On the left side, depending on the version, there is either a slot for 1 SIM card or a hybrid slot for 2 SIM cards or 1 SIM card and a microSD memory card up to 256 GB. On the right side, there are volume control buttons and the smartphone's power button. The fingerprint scanner is displayed on the rear panel, positioned in the middle.

The Huawei P10 lite was sold in 4 colors: Graphite Black, Pearl White, Platinum Gold, and Sapphire Blue.

=== Hardware ===
The smartphone received a HiSilicon Kirin 658 processor and a Mali-T830 MP2 GPU. The battery has a capacity of 3000 mAh and supports 18 W fast charging.

The P10 lite features an LTPS LCD display, stzing at 5.2", FullHD (1920 × 1080) with a pixel density of 424 ppi and a 16:9 aspect ratio.

The smartphone was sold in 3/32, 4/32, and 4/64 GB configurations.

==== Camera ====
The P10 lite's singular camera module features a 12 MP main camera with an aperture of f/2.2 and phase autofocus, and an 8 MP front camera with an aperture of f/2.0. Both the main and front cameras can record video in 1080p@30fps.

=== Software ===
The smartphone was released with EMUI 5.1 based on Android 7.0 Nougat. It was updated to EMUI 8 based on Android 8.0 Oreo.

== See also ==
- BlackBerry KeyOne
- Meizu M6
- Samsung Galaxy J3 Prime
