= Huawei P50 =

Smartphones released by Huawei in 2021

Huawei P50 Huawei P50 Pro
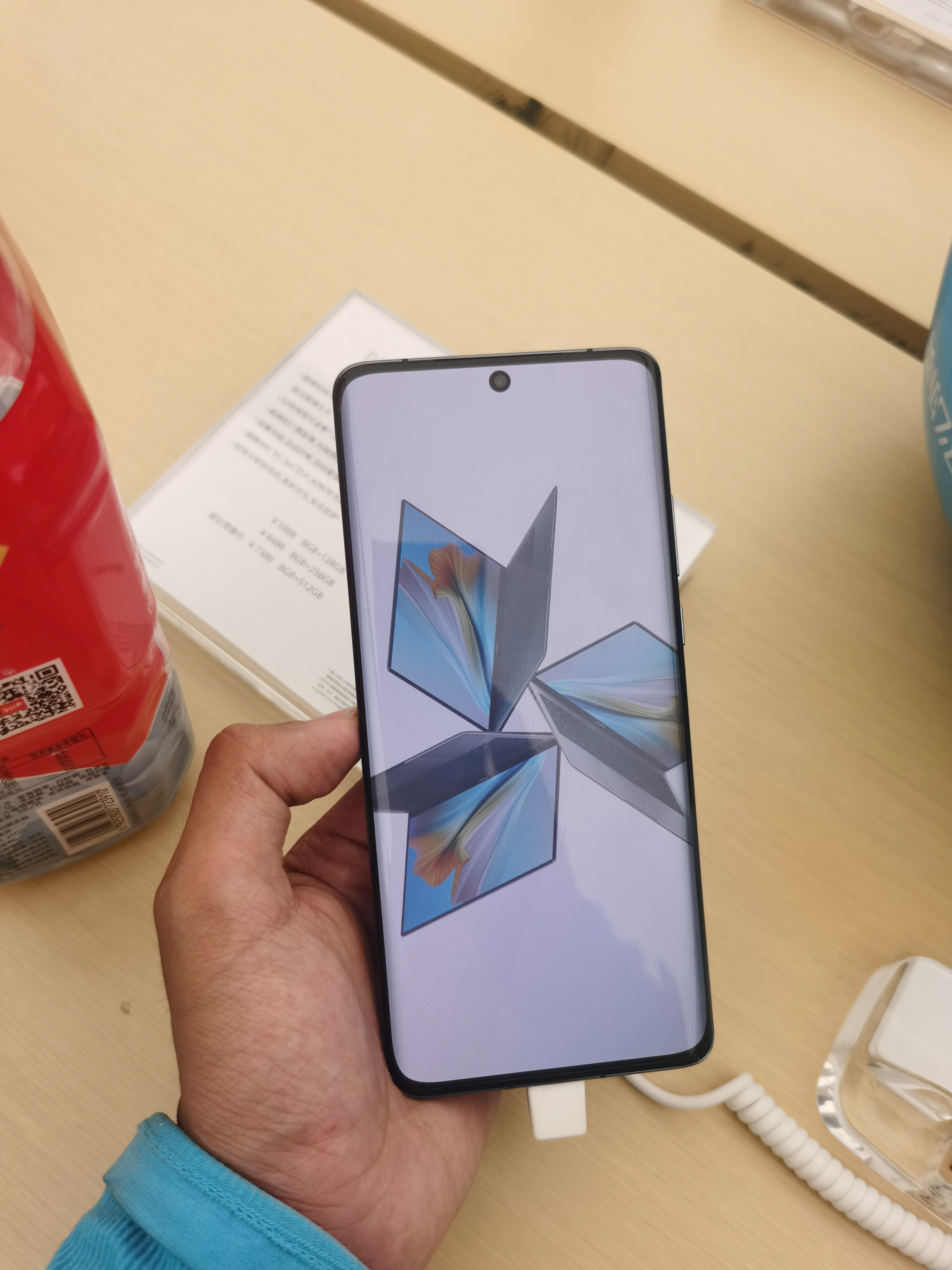
- The front Huawei P50 Pro
- Manufacturer: Huawei
- Type: Smartphone
- Series: P series
- First released: December 4, 2021; 4 years ago
- Discontinued: Yes
- Predecessor: Huawei P40
- Successor: Huawei P60
- Related: Huawei Mate 40
- Compatible networks: 2G, 3G, 4G, 4G LTE
- Form factor: Slate
- Dimensions: P50: 156.5 × 73.8 × 7.9 mm (6.16 × 2.91 × 0.31 in); P50 Pro : 158.8 × 72.8 × 8.5 mm (6.25 × 2.87 × 0.33 in)
- Weight: P50: 181 g (6.4 oz); P50 Pro: 195 g (6.9 oz)
- Operating system: Original: HarmonyOS 2.0 (China and Philippines) or EMUI 12 (international); Current: HarmonyOS 4 or EMUI 14
- System-on-chip: HiSilicon Kirin 9000; Qualcomm Snapdragon 888 4G
- CPU: Octa-core Kirin 9000 (1x 3.13 GHz Cortex A77, 3x 2.54 GHz Cortex A77, 4x 2.05 GHz Cortex-A55) Snapdragon 888 4G (1x 2.84 GHz Cortex X1, 3x 2.42 GHz Cortex A78, 4x 1.80 GHz Cortex-A55)
- GPU: Kirin 9000 Mali-G78 MP24 Snapdragon 888 4G Adreno 660
- Memory: P50: 8 GB LPDDR5 RAM; P50 Pro: 8 or 12 GB LPDDR5 RAM
- Storage: P50: 128 or 256 GB; P50 Pro: 128, 256 or 512 GB
- Removable storage: Nano Memory, expandable up to 256 GB
- SIM: nanoSIM
- Battery: P50: 4100 mAh; P50 Pro: 4360 mAh
- Charging: P50: 66w Supercharge; P50 Pro: 66w wired+50w wireless Supercharge
- Rear camera: P50: Triple: 50 MP Wide (f/1.8, 23mm, 1/1.56", 1.0µm), + 13 MP Ultrawide (f/2.2, 16mm) + 12 MP Telephoto (f/3.4, 125mm, OIS), Leica optics, 5x optical zoom, phase detection and laser AF, gyro-EIS, dual-LED dual-tone flash, 4K@30/60fps, 1080p@30/60fps/960fps; P50 Pro: Quad: 50 MP Wide (f/1.8, 23mm, 1/1.56", 1.0µm, OIS) + 13 MP Ultrawide (f/2.2, 1/3.06", 13mm) + 64 MP Telephoto (f/3.5, 90mm, OIS) + 40 MP (f/1.6, 26mm (B/W), Leica optics, 3.5x optical zoom, phase detection and laser AF, gyro-EIS, HDR, dual-LED dual-tone flash, 4K@30/60fps, 1080p@30/60fps/960fps
- Front camera: 13 MP, autofocus, f/2.4 (P50) or f/2.4, 4k@30fps, 1080p@30fps/60fps/240fps
- Display: P50: 6.5 in (170 mm) 2700x1224 OLED, (458 ppi), 19.5:9 aspect ratio, 90 Hz refresh rate; P50 Pro : 6.6 in (170 mm) 2700x1228 OLED, (450 ppi), 19.8:9 aspect ratio, 120 Hz refresh rate
- Connectivity: Wi-Fi, 802.11a/b/g/n/ac/ax with Wi-Fi Direct support, BT5.1, BLE, USB Type C 3.1
- Data inputs: GPS/Glonass/BDS/Galileo/QZSS, accelerometer, gyroscope, compass, proximity sensor
- Water resistance: IP68, up to 1.5 m (4.9 ft) for 30 minutes
- Website: Huawei P50; Huawei P50 Pro

The Huawei P50 and P50 Pro are HarmonyOS-based high-end smartphones manufactured by Huawei. Unveiled on 21 July 2021, they succeed the Huawei P40 in the P series. In March 2023 Huawei released their successor Huawei P60 Series phones in China, and in May 2023 it released the Huawei P60 Pro in Europe.

== Specifications ==
=== Hardware ===
Unlike the Huawei P40 hardware, the P50 uses the Qualcomm Snapdragon SM8325 888 4G processor. The P50 operates on Octa-core (1×2.84 GHz Kryo 680 & 3×2.42 GHz Kryo 680 & 4×1.80 GHz Kryo 680) which is an upgrade from the previous version on the P40.

The P50 operates on the Adreno 660 GPU. The phone has 8 GB RAM and has 128 GB or 256 GB storage space, which allows for more storage and smooth run of the device. Expansion is supported up to 256 GB via Huawei's proprietary Nano Memory card. The P50 display was upgraded by 0.4 from the previous P40, which had 6.1 for display. The new 6.5-inches (101.6 cm) 88.0% screen-to-body ratio with a resolution of 2700×1224 pixels OLED with a 1B color and 90 Hz refresh rate. The P50 model has an optical (under-screen) fingerprint sensor.

The P50 uses a 4100 mAh non-removable battery, an upgrade from its previous 3800 mAh on the P40.

=== Camera ===
The Huawei P50 series features Leica optics. The wide lens on P50 and P50 Pro is a new "True-Form" 50 MP IMX766 sensor. Unlike the P40, whose wide lens uses an "Ultra Super Spectrum" image sensor, the P50 uses a traditional RGGB sensor instead.

The P50's rear camera array consists of a 50 MP wide lens, a 13 MP 16 mm ultrawide lens and an 12 MP telephoto lens with 5x optical zoom. For P50 Pro, 50 MP wide lens now has optical image stabilization. The 13 MP ultrawide is now wider in 13 mm, the periscope telephoto now has a 64 MP sensor at 3.5x and an additional 40 MP monochrome sensor to capture more light.

The software is also improved with a new Golden Snap feature that takes a burst of HDR+ photos and automatically picks the best shots. A Profoto studio light will be available as an accessory as well.

=== Software ===
The device was originally shipped with HarmonyOS 2.0 (China) or EMUI 12 (international). In June 2023, the phone was upgraded to EMUI 13 internationally, and in September 2023 it received an upgrade to HarmonyOS 4 in China. In July 2024, the P50 Pro received an upgrade to EMUI 14.2 internationally. The P50 series supports Huawei Mobile Services and uses Huawei AppGallery as its main app store.
