= Huawei P40 =

High-end Android smartphone line by Huawei

Huawei P40 Huawei P40 Pro Huawei P40 Pro+
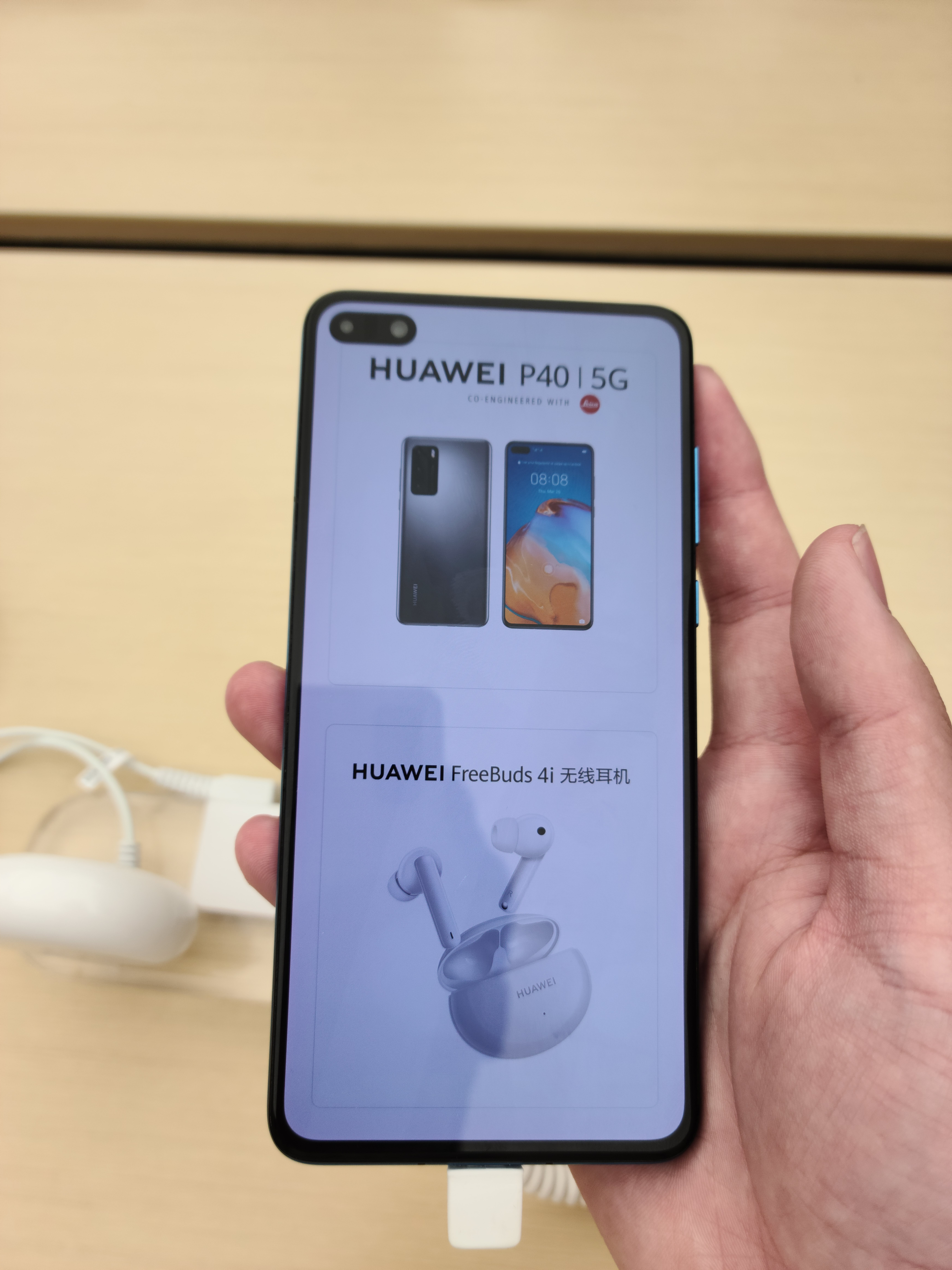
- Huawei P40
- Manufacturer: Huawei
- Type: Smartphone
- Series: P series
- First released: April 7, 2020; 6 years ago
- Discontinued: Yes
- Predecessor: Huawei P30
- Successor: Huawei P50
- Related: Huawei P40 lite; Huawei P40 lite E; Huawei P40 lite 5G; Huawei Mate 40
- Compatible networks: 2G, 3G, 4G, 4G LTE, 5G
- Form factor: Slate
- Dimensions: P40: 148.9 × 71.1 × 8.5 mm (5.86 × 2.80 × 0.33 in); P40 Pro & P40 Pro+: 158.2 × 72.6 × 9 mm (6.23 × 2.86 × 0.35 in)
- Weight: P40: 175 g (6.2 oz); P40 Pro: 209 g (7.4 oz); P40 Pro+: 226 g (8.0 oz)
- Operating system: Original: EMUI 10.1, based on Android 10 (SDK Rom); Current: EMUI 12 (international) and HarmonyOS 4.2 (China)
- System-on-chip: HiSilicon Kirin 990 5G
- CPU: Octa-core (2x 2.86 GHz Cortex A76, 2x 2.36 GHz Cortex A76, 4x 1.95 GHz Cortex A55)
- GPU: Mali-G76 MP16
- Memory: P40: 6 or 8 GB LPDDR4X RAM; P40 Pro & P40 Pro+: 8 GB LPDDR4X RAM
- Storage: P40: 128 or 256 GB; P40 Pro: 128, 256 or 512 GB; P40 Pro+: 256 or 512 GB
- Removable storage: Nano Memory, expandable up to 256 GB
- SIM: nanoSIM
- Battery: P40: 3800 mAh; P40 Pro & P40 Pro+: 4200 mAh
- Charging: Supercharge
- Rear camera: P40: Triple: 50 MP Wide (f/1.9, 23mm, 1/1.28", 2.44µm, OIS), + 16 MP Ultrawide (f/2.2, 17mm) + 8 MP Telephoto (f/2.4, 80mm, OIS), Leica optics, 3x optical zoom, phase detection and laser AF, gyro-EIS, dual-LED dual-tone flash, 4K@30/60fps, 1080p@30/60fps; P40 Pro: Quad: 50 MP Wide (f/1.9, 23mm, 1/1.28", 2.44µm, OIS) + 40 MP Ultrawide (f/1.8, 1/1.54", 18mm) + 12 MP Telephoto (f/3.4, 125mm, OIS) + time-of-flight sensor, Leica optics, 5x optical zoom, phase detection and laser AF, gyro-EIS, HDR, dual-LED dual-tone flash, 4K@30/60fps, 1080p@30/60fps, 720p@7680fps; P40 Pro+: Penta: 50 MP Wide (f/1.9, 23mm, 1/1.28", 2.44µm, OIS) + 40 MP Ultrawide (f/1.8, 1/1.54", 18mm) + 8 MP Telephoto (f/4.4, 240mm, OIS) + 8 MP Telephoto (f/2.4, 80mm, OIS) + time-of-flight sensor, Leica optics, 3x & 10x optical zoom, phase detection and laser AF, gyro-EIS, HDR, dual-LED dual-tone flash, 4K@30/60fps, 1080p@30/60fps, 720p@7680fps
- Front camera: 32 MP, autofocus (not on P40), f/2.0 (P40) or f/2.2 (P40 Pro & P40 Pro+), 1080p video
- Display: P40: 6.1 in (150 mm) 1080x2340 OLED, (422 ppi), 19.5:9 aspect ratio, 60 Hz refresh rate; P40 Pro & P40 Pro+: 6.58 in (167 mm) 1200x2640 OLED, (441 ppi), 19.8:9 aspect ratio, 90Hz refresh rate
- Connectivity: Wi-Fi, 802.11a/b/g/n/ac/ax with Wi-Fi Direct support, BT5.1, BLE, USB Type C 3.1
- Data inputs: GPS/Glonass/BDS/Galileo/QZSS, accelerometer, gyroscope, compass, proximity sensor
- Water resistance: P40: IP53; P40 Pro & P40 Pro+: IP68, up to 1.5 m (4.9 ft) for 30 minutes
- Website: Huawei P40; Huawei P40 Pro; Huawei P40 Pro+

Huawei P40 is a line of high-end Android-based smartphones manufactured by Huawei. Unveiled on 26 March 2020, they succeed the Huawei P30 in the company's P series line.

== Design ==
The P40 and P40 Pro are constructed with anodized aluminum for the frame, while the back uses Gorilla Glass. The P40 Pro+ uses ceramic for both the frame and the back. The display is flat on the P40, and curved on all sides on the P40 Pro and P40 Pro+; Huawei calls this a Quad-Curve Overflow Display. The top left corner of the display has a pill-shaped cutout for the front-facing camera and ambient/proximity sensors; it also accommodates the infrared face unlock system on the P40 Pro and P40 Pro+.

As on the P30 Pro, the P40 Pro and P40 Pro+ replace the traditional earpiece speaker with an “electromagnetic levitation” speaker that vibrates the top of the phone's screen, and have an IR blaster on the top edge. A rectangular module houses the rear cameras, which protrudes slightly from the back panel.

The P40 and P40 Pro are available in Silver Frost, Blush Gold, Deep Sea Blue, Ice White and Black, while the P40 Pro+ is available in Ceramic White or Ceramic Black. Additionally, the P40 has an IP53 rating, while the P40 Pro and P40 Pro+ have an IP68 rating.

== Specifications ==
=== Hardware ===
The P40 series is powered by the HiSilicon Kirin 990 5G processor, meaning that all models have 5G connectivity, unlike the successor P50 series that lacked 5G due to the United States sanctions that came into effect in September 2020. However, only "sub-6" 5G is available on the P40, meaning the P40 series is not compatible with ultra-fast millimeter-wave (mmWave) networks. The Kirin 990 5G is assisted by the Mali-G76 MP16 GPU. The P40 has 6 or 8 GB of LPDDR4X RAM, while the P40 Pro & P40 Pro+ have 8 GB of LPDDR4X RAM. All models have UFS 3.0: the P40 has 128 or 256 GB, the P40 Pro has 128, 256 or 512 GB and the P40 Pro+ has 256 or 512 GB. Expansion is supported up to 256 GB via Huawei's proprietary Nano Memory card.

The P40's display is carried over from the P30, a 6.1-inch (154.94 mm) 19.5:9 1080p (1080 × 2340) OLED with a 60 Hz refresh rate. The P40 Pro and P40 Pro+ use a larger 6.58-inch (167.13 mm) 19.8:9 1080p+ (1200 × 2640) OLED and a 90 Hz refresh rate, as well as support for HDR10 and DCI-P3. In addition to the infrared face unlock system, all P40 models have an optical (under-screen) fingerprint sensor; Huawei claims the sensor is 30% larger and faster than the P30's.

The P40 uses a 3800 mAh battery, while the P40 Pro and P40 Pro+ use a larger 4200 mAh battery. Fast charging is supported on all models, however the P40 does not support wireless charging. The P40 can charge wired up to 22.5 W while the P40 Pro and P40 Pro+ have a max rate of 40 W. Both the P40 Pro and P40 Pro+ are also capable of reverse wireless charging at 27 W, but the P40 Pro+ can charge faster wirelessly at 40 W whereas the P40 Pro can only charge wirelessly at 27 W.

==== Camera ====
The Huawei P40 series features Leica optics, and the wide lens on all models is a new “Ultra Vision” 50 MP sensor. Like the P30, the wide lens uses a "SuperSpectrum" image sensor, whose color filter array uses yellow sub-pixels instead of green. Huawei stated that this would allow more light to be captured, and enhanced absorption of red and green colors.

The P40's rear camera array consists of a 50 MP wide lens, a 16 MP ultrawide lens and an 8 MP telephoto lens with 3x optical zoom. The P40 Pro increases the resolution of the ultrawide sensor to 40 MP, replaces the standard telephoto lens with a 12 MP periscope sensor capable of 5x optical zoom, and adds a time-of-flight sensor.

The P40 Pro+ has two 8 MP telephoto lenses, a standard sensor with 3x optical zoom and a periscope sensor with 10x optical zoom while retaining the time-of-flight sensor. The front-facing camera uses a 32 MP sensor, which has autofocus on the P40 Pro and P40 Pro+; an additional depth sensor allows for the face unlock.

For both photo and video, pixel binning is used for improved low-light sensitivity, and video can be captured from the wide-angle and telephoto sensors simultaneously with directional audio computed from three omnidirectional microphones.

The cameras benefit from a XD Fusion Image Engine which enables advanced computational photography, as well as an "Octa" phase-detection autofocus system for faster autofocus and improved white balance sensors on the P40 Pro+. The software is also improved with a new Golden Snap feature that takes a burst of HDR+ photos and automatically picks the best shots. A Profoto studio light will be available as an accessory as well.

=== Software ===
The P40 series originally shipped with EMUI 10.1, which is based on the Android 10 source code. In January 2022, the smartphone received an upgrade to EMUI 12. An additional upgrade to EMUI 13 was expected, but had not been confirmed as of summer 2023. Starting in December 2020, Chinese smartphones could be migrated from EMUI to HarmonyOS 2, and in July 2023 they received an upgrade to HarmonyOS 3.1.

Due to the ongoing United States sanctions against Huawei, international models of the P40 did not ship with, or support, Google Mobile Services—the proprietary software suite (including Google Play-branded software) shipped on certified Android devices. Huawei was also not allowed to market the device using the Android trademark.

The P40 series supports Huawei Mobile Services and uses Huawei AppGallery as its main app store. Furthermore, a new app known as Petal Search was introduced, which includes web search via France-based Qwant and Russia-based Yandex, as well as the ability to search for third-party apps via other Android app stores and APK mirroring websites. The P40 series introduces a new in-house voice assistant, Celia, in selected markets, which also includes integration with the device's AI Lens features.

== Reception ==
The P40 Pro gets a Photo score of 140 points and the best Video score of 105 points from DxOMark.

== See also ==
- List of longest smartphone telephoto lenses
