= Huawei P30 =

High-end smartphone line by Huawei

Huawei P30 Huawei P30 Pro Huawei P30 Lite
- Huawei P30 Pro (a sub-version of Huawei P30)
- Manufacturer: Huawei
- Type: Smartphone
- Series: Huawei P series
- First released: March 26, 2019; 7 years ago
- Discontinued: Yes
- Predecessor: Huawei P20
- Successor: Huawei P40
- Related: Huawei Mate 30
- Form factor: Slate
- Dimensions: P30: 149.1 mm × 71.4 mm × 7.6 mm (5.87 in × 2.81 in × 0.30 in); P30 Pro: 158 mm × 73.4 mm × 8.4 mm (6.22 in × 2.89 in × 0.33 in)
- Weight: P30: 165 g (5.8 oz); P30 Pro: 192 g (6.8 oz)
- Operating system: Original: Android 9.0 "Pie" with EMUI 9 Current: Android 10 with EMUI 12 (Global) and HarmonyOS 4 (China)
- System-on-chip: Kirin 980
- CPU: Octa-core (2x 2.6 GHz Cortex A76, 2x 1.92 GHz Cortex A76, 4x 1.8 GHz Cortex A55)
- GPU: Mali-G76 MP10
- Memory: 4, 6 or 8 GB LPDDR4X RAM
- Storage: P30: 64, 128, or 256 GB P30 Pro: 128, 256, or 512 GB P30 Lite: 64, 128 or 256 GB
- Removable storage: Huawei Nano Memory up to 256 GB
- SIM: nanoSIM
- Battery: P30: 3650 mAh; P30 Pro: 4200 mAh
- Charging: Supercharge
- Rear camera: P30: Triple: 40 MP IMX600y Wide (f/1.8, 27mm, 1/1.7") + 16 MP Ultrawide (f/2.2, 17mm) + 8 MP Telephoto (f/2.4, 80mm, 1/4", OIS), Leica optics, 3x optical zoom, phase detection and laser AF, dual-LED dual-tone flash P30 Pro: 40 MP IMX600y Wide (f/1.6, 1/1.7", 27mm, OIS) + 20 MP Ultrawide (f/2.2, 1/2.7", 16mm) + 8 MP Telephoto (f/3.4, 1/4", 125mm, OIS) + time-of-flight sensor, Leica optics, 5x optical zoom, phase detection and laser AF, dual-LED dual-tone flash
- Front camera: 32 MP, autofocus, f/2.0, 1080p video
- Display: P30: 6.1 in (150 mm) 1080x2340 OLED, (422 ppi); P30 Pro: 6.47 in (164 mm) 1080x2340 OLED, (398 ppi)
- Connectivity: Wi-Fi, 802.11a/b/g/n/ac with Wi-Fi Direct support, BT5.0, BLE, aptX/aptX HD, USB Type C 3.1
- Data inputs: GPS/Glonass/BDS/Galileo/QZSS, accelerometer, gyroscope, compass, proximity sensor
- Water resistance: P30: IP53; P30 Pro: IP68, up to 1.5 m (4.9 ft) for 30 minutes
- Website: Huawei P30; Huawei P30 Pro; Huawei P30 lite

Huawei P30 is a line of Android-based smartphones manufactured by Huawei. Unveiled on 26 March 2019, they succeeded the Huawei P20 in the company's P series line.

== Specifications ==
=== Hardware ===
Their designs are similar to those of the P20; the P30 Pro has a curved screen, and replaces the traditional earpiece speaker with an “electromagnetic levitation” speaker that vibrates the top of the phone's screen, enabling a narrower bezel. The P30 has IP53 water and dustproofing, while the P30 Pro has IP68, but does not include a headphone jack. Both models utilise the Kirin 980 system-on-chip. The devices feature an in-screen optical fingerprint reader, stated to have improved performance over that of the Mate 20 Pro.

In September 2019, Huawei unveiled new “Mystic Blue” and “Misty Lavender” color finishes for the P30 Pro, which carry a two-tone appearance using matte and glossy finishes. In May 2020, Huawei announced new 256 GB “New Edition” P30 Pro models for Germany, including a new silver color scheme.

==== Camera ====
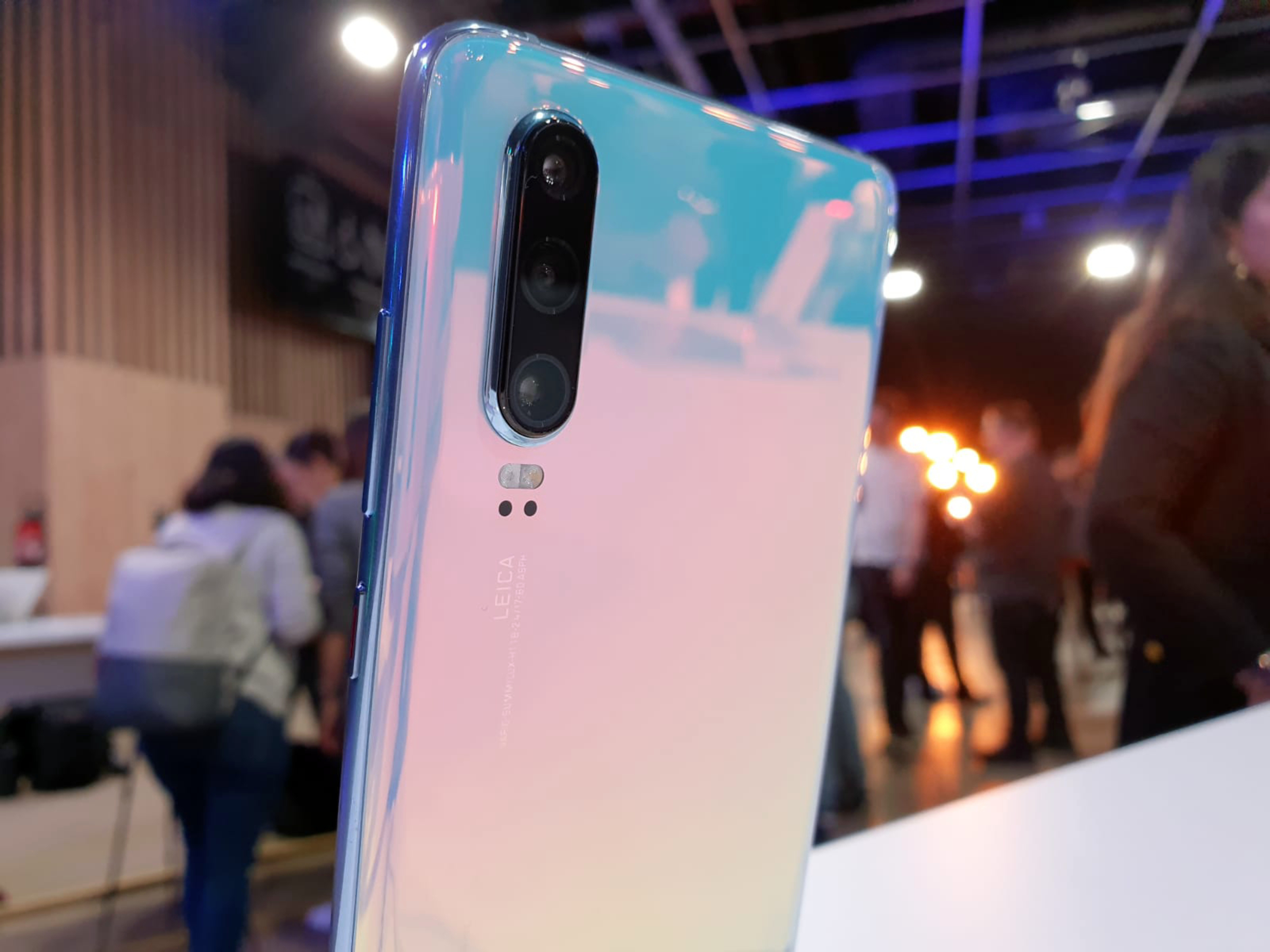
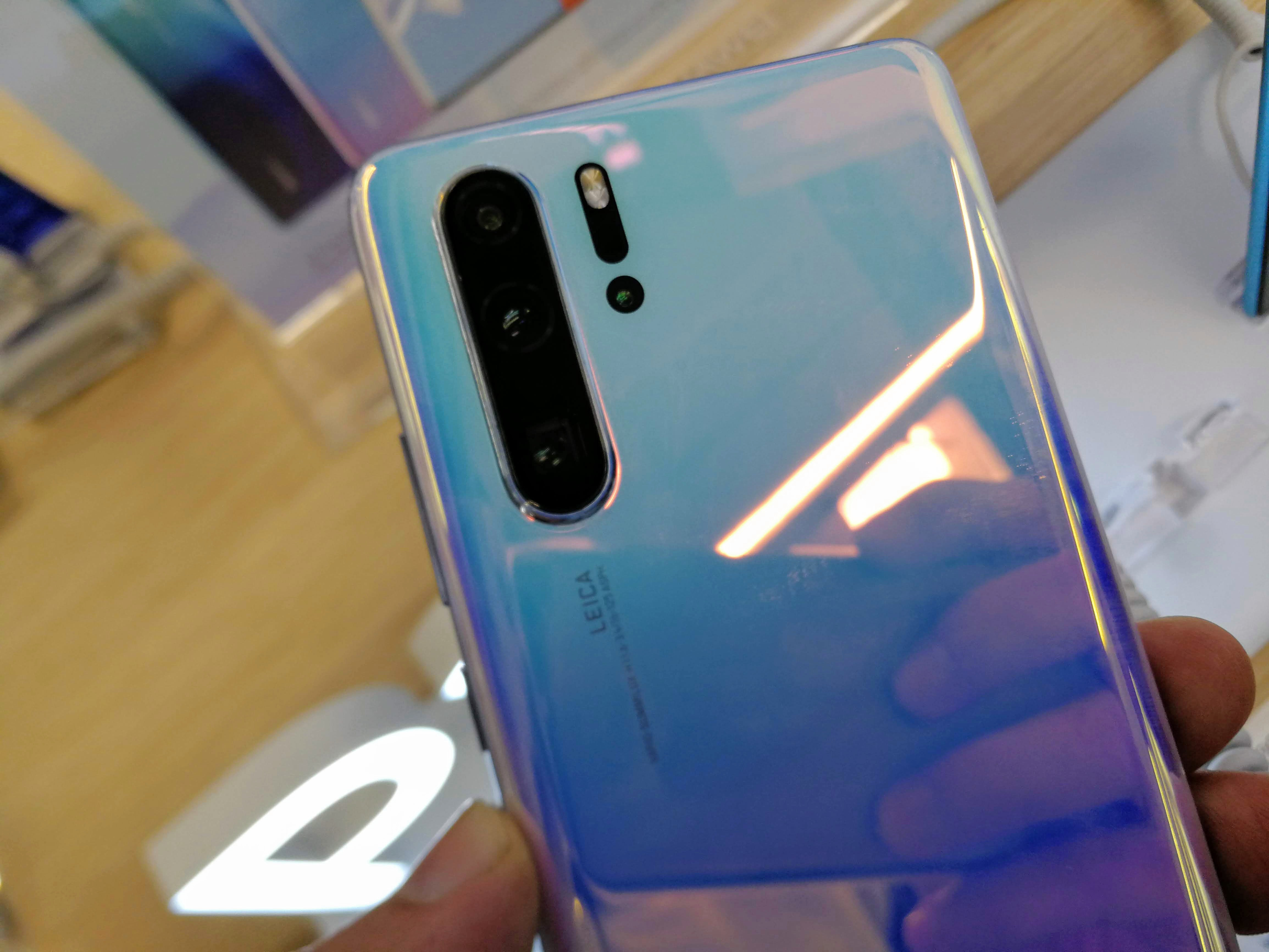
The P30's camera (left) and the P30 Pro's camera (right)

The P30 Pro features three rear-facing camera lenses with Leica optics, including a 40-megapixel lens, 20-megapixel ultra-wide angle lens, an 8-megapixel periscope lens with 5× optical zoom. The optical zoom can be combined with software-assisted digital zoom of up to 50x. The P30 Pro also includes a time-of-flight sensor.

The base P30 model excludes the periscope lens (reducing it to 3x optical zoom), reduces the ultra-wide angle lens to 16-megapixels, and does not include optical image stabilization (software-based AI stabilization is still used).

The 40-megapixel lens on both models contain a "SuperSpectrum" image sensor, whose color filter array uses yellow sub-pixels instead of green. Huawei stated that this would allow more light to be captured, and would improve absorption of red and green colors. This sensor is leveraged by improvements to the camera software's night mode, as well as new "Super HDR" and "Super Low Light" capture modes.

=== Software ===
The P30 line ships with Android 9.0 “Pie”, with Huawei's EMUI 9.1 software suite. Huawei unveiled an Android 10-based EMUI 10 in August 2019, with the P30 among the first to receive an update via its beta program. The Mystic Blue and Misty Lavender P30 models come preloaded with Android 10.

== Reception ==
Vlad Savov of The Verge felt that the P30 Pro was comparable to the Samsung Galaxy S10 in terms of hardware specifications, but that Huawei was an “unrivalled champ” in camera quality. Its cameras were shown to have better low-light performance at its default settings than the Pixel 3's “Night Sight” mode (which requires a long exposure), and that even with a slight reduction in sharpness past 10x, there was very little degradation in the quality of zoomed images with its periscope lens, producing a usable image even at 32x zoom. However, although not as aggressive as the P20 Pro, he still felt that Huawei's automatic processing was "too aggressive with its mix of grain-suppressing blur and additive sharpening", and that the Pixel 3 had more accurate white balance. Savov felt that the P30 Pro had good Bluetooth and Wi-Fi performance, “heroically long” battery life, and that the “magnetic levitation” earpiece worked “shockingly well”. However, its display was considered to be inferior in quality to the S10 (due to its comparatively lower resolution, and a discolouration of the curved edges at certain viewing angles), the in-display fingerprint reader was not as fast as the P20, and that Huawei's default user interface was "more frustrating and nagging than helpful".

In a review of the standard P30, Pocket-lint noted that its overall size was more in line with the previous year's P20 Pro (if not slightly more compact due to the replacement of the physical fingerprint reader), and that it still included a headphone jack and most of the P30 Pro's new hardware. However, the camera was considered to have downgraded quality over the P30 Pro, and its battery life was not as good due to its smaller capacity.

Researchers found that the P30's new camera mode, which was purportedly intended to enhance photos of the Moon, merely composed existing imagery of the Moon into the photo to enhance its appearance.
