= Huawei P10 =

Smartphone developed by Huawei

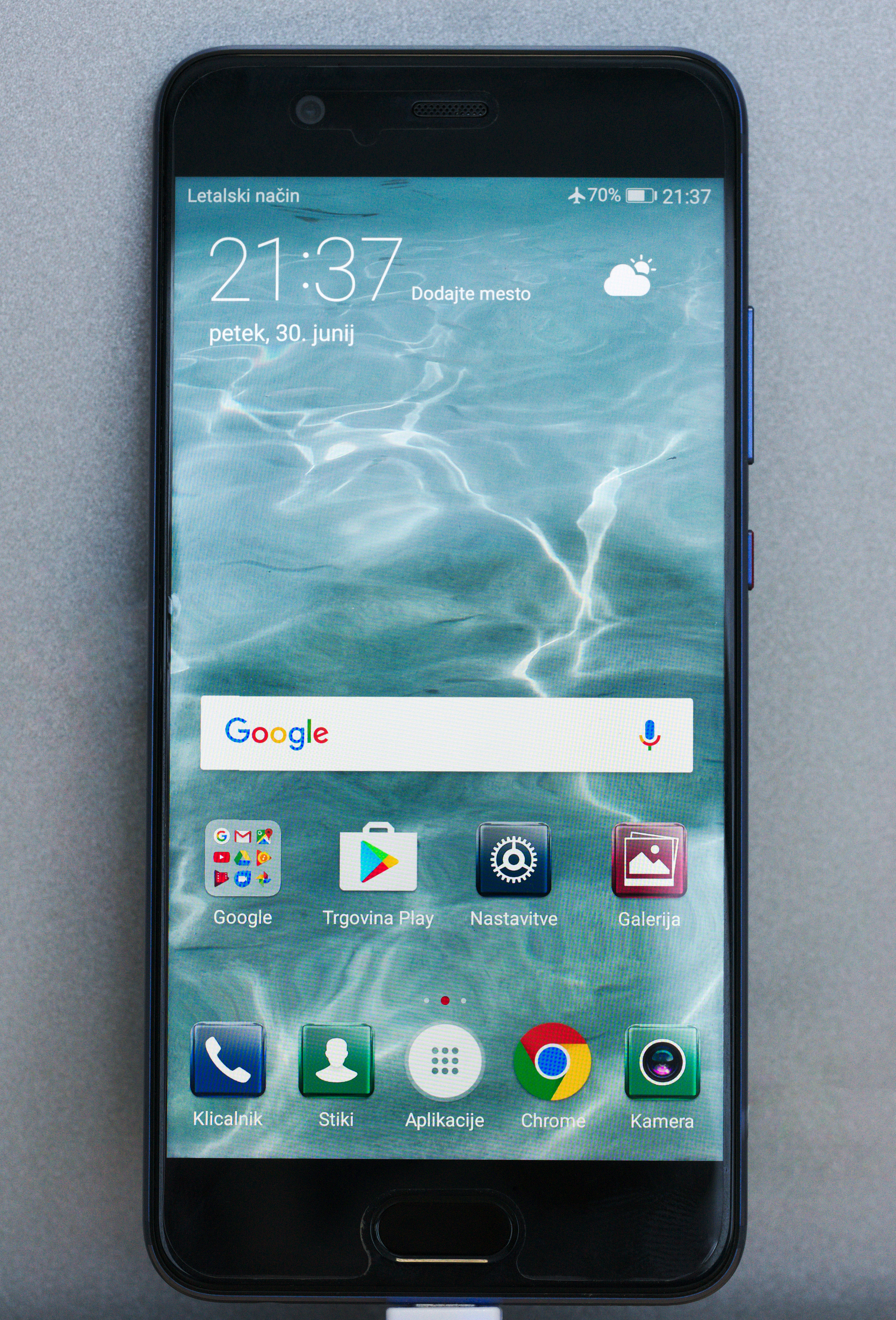
- Huawei P10
- Manufacturer: Huawei
- Type: Smartphone
- Series: P series
- First released: March 2017; 9 years ago
- Discontinued: Yes
- Predecessor: Huawei P9
- Successor: Huawei P20
- Related: Huawei P10 Lite, Huawei P10 Plus
- Form factor: Phablet
- Dimensions: P10: 145.3 × 69.3 × 6.98 mm (5.720 × 2.728 × 0.275 in); P10 Plus: 153.5 × 74.2 × 6.98 mm (6.043 × 2.921 × 0.275 in)
- Weight: P10: 145 g (5.11 oz); P10 Plus: 165 g (5.82 oz)
- Operating system: Original: Android 7.0 "Nougat"; Current: Android 9.0 "Pie" and HarmonyOS 2 (China)
- System-on-chip: Hisilicon Kirin 960
- CPU: Quad-core 2.4 GHz Cortex-A73 and quad-core 1.8 GHz Cortex-A53)
- GPU: Mali-G71 MP8
- Memory: 4 GB (P10), 4 or 6 GB (P10 Plus)
- Storage: 32 GB, 64 GB or 128 GB
- Removable storage: microSD, expandable up to 256 GB
- SIM: nanoSIM
- Battery: 3200 mAh (P10), 3750 mAh (P10 Plus)
- Charging: Supercharge
- Rear camera: 12 MP and 20 MP f/2.2
- Front camera: 8 MP
- Display: 5.1" 1080p (P10), 5.5" 1440p (P10 Plus)
- Connectivity: GPS, GLONASS, BeiDou
- Website: Official website

The Huawei P10 is an Android-based phablet smartphone manufactured by Huawei. Announced at Mobile World Congress 2017 on 26 February 2017, the P10 is the successor to the Huawei P9 and was succeeded by the Huawei P20 in 2018.

== Specifications ==
=== Hardware ===
The P10 is constructed with a metal chassis, available in various color finishes. Two color options, "Dazzling Blue" and "Dazzling Gold", feature a patterned "Hyper Diamond Cut" finish which reduces its susceptibility to fingerprints. The front of the device features a button-like fingerprint reader, which can also be used for gesture-based navigation. The P10 features a 5.1-inch 1080p display. A larger version, known as the P10 Plus, features a 5.5-inch 1440p display. The P10 utilizes Huawei's octa-core Kirin 960 system-on-chip, with four 1.84 GHz Cortex-A53 cores and four Cortex-A73 cores at 2.36 GHz. The P10 utilizes 4 GB of RAM, while the P10 Plus uses 4 or 6 GB. It comes with 32, 64, or 128 GB of internal storage.

=== Camera ===
Like the P9, the P10 utilizes a dual camera array on the back with Leica lenses, consisting of a monochrome 20-megapixel sensor and a 12-megapixel color sensor. The P10 cameras utilize an f/2.2 aperture.

=== Software ===
The P10 ships with Android 7.0 "Nougat" and Huawei's EMUI software suite. An update to Android 8.0 "Oreo" and EMUI 8.1 was released in March 2018. In March 2019, Huawei released an update to Android 9.0 "Pie" and EMUI 9.

== Reception ==
The Huawei P10 received mixed reviews. The Verge felt that the design of the P10 was "attractive" and an "up-to-date" derivative of the iPhone 6 (noting its slim build and other accenting), although arguing that the "Hyper Diamond Cut" finish made the device feel cheaper than intended. It was also noted that the fingerprint sensor's swiping gestures made Android more difficult to navigate. The camera was praised for having "dramatically better image quality than its closest competitors", its software and effects, and for lacking a noticeable "bump" protrusion around its lenses. In conclusion, it was argued that the P10 was overpriced and otherwise developed "without confidence or direction", although it received some upgrades from last year's model, such a camera upgrade (addition of OIS, brighter aperture, 4K video recording, 2x lossless zoom).

Some P10 devices utilize LPDDR3 RAM instead of LPDDR4, while its storage memory is mixed between eMMC 5.1 and Universal Flash Storage (UFS) 2.0 or 2.1 components. Huawei faced complaints over the variances between devices, with Chinese users noting differences in benchmark performance between these different memory types. In April 2017, Huawei defended the differences as the standard practice of sourcing specific components from multiple sources in order to meet market demand, also citing an industry-wide shortage of flash memory.
