= Huawei P20 =

Android-based smartphone by Huawei

Huawei P20 and P20 Pro
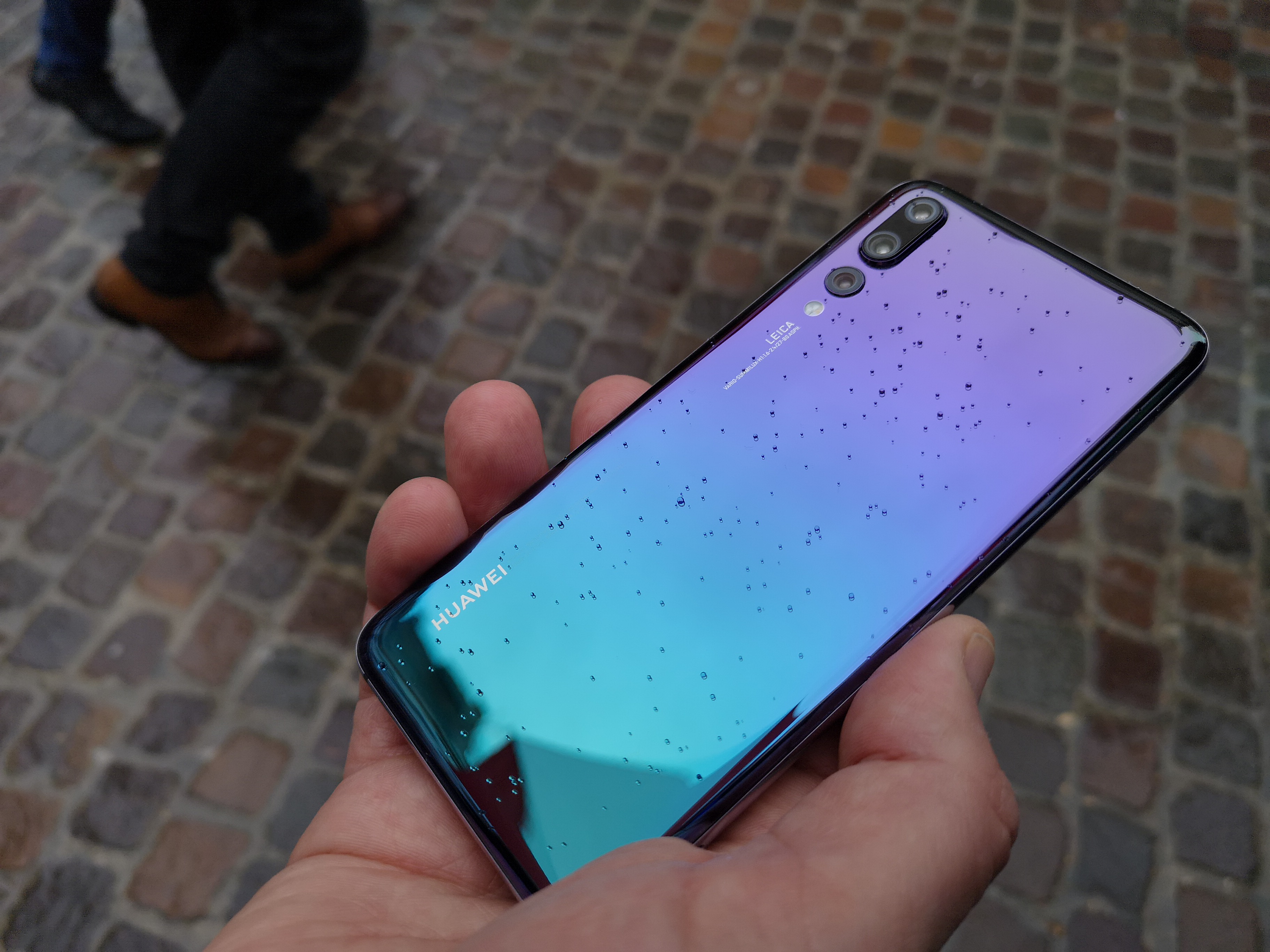
- Huawei P20 Pro in "Twilight"
- Manufacturer: Huawei
- Type: Smartphone
- Series: Huawei P series
- First released: March 27, 2018; 8 years ago
- Discontinued: March 12, 2019
- Predecessor: Huawei P10
- Successor: Huawei P30
- Related: Huawei Mate 20
- Form factor: Slate
- Weight: 165 g (6 oz)
- Operating system: Original: Android 8.1 with EMUI 8.1; Current: P20 and P20 Pro: Android 10 with EMUI 12 (Global) and HarmonyOS 3 (China); P20 Lite: Android 9 with EMUI 9.1
- System-on-chip: Kirin 970
- CPU: Octa-core (4x2.4 GHz Cortex-A73 & 4x1.8 GHz Cortex-A53)
- GPU: Mali-G72 MP12
- Memory: P20: 4 GB LPDDR4X RAM; P20 Pro: 6 GB LPDDR4X RAM
- Storage: 128 GB
- Removable storage: None
- SIM: nanoSIM
- Battery: P20: 3400 mAh; P20 Pro: 4000 mAh
- Charging: Supercharge
- Rear camera: P20: Dual: 20 MP Monochrome (f/1.6, 1/2.3", 1.55 μm, OIS) + 12 MP RGB (f/1.8, 27mm), Leica optics, 2x optical zoom, phase detection and laser AF, dual-LED dual-tone flash P20 Pro: Triple: 40 MP IMX600 RGB (f/1.8, 1/1.7", OIS) + 20 MP Monochrome (f/1.6) + 8 MP RGB Telephoto (f/2.4), Leica optics, 3x optical zoom, phase detection and laser AF, dual-LED dual-tone flash
- Front camera: 24 MP, fixed-focus, f/2.0, 1080p video
- Display: P20: 5.84 in (148 mm) 1080x2244 LTPS LCD, ~432ppi pixel density P20 Pro: 6.1 in (150 mm) 1080x2244 AMOLED, 408ppi pixel density
- Water resistance: IP67, up to 1 m (3.3 ft) for 30 minutes (P20 Pro)
- Codename: Emily (P20); Charlotte (P20 Pro); Anne (P20 Lite)
- Other: GPS, GLONASS, Galileo, BeiDou
- Website: Huawei P20; Huawei P20 Pro

Huawei P20 and Huawei P20 Pro are Android-based smartphones manufactured by Huawei. Unveiled 27 March 2018, they succeed the Huawei P10 in the company's P series line.

The P20 line is distinguished primarily by its cameras, which Huawei promoted as featuring artificial intelligence technology to perform automated enhancements to images, and the P20 Pro featuring both a wide-angle 40-megapixel camera, and an 8-megapixel camera with optical zoom.

== Specifications ==
=== Hardware ===
The P20 is constructed with a metal chassis and glass backing, has a fingerprint reader on the front that can also be used for gesture navigation, and is available in various color finishes. Both the P20 and P20 Pro feature 1080p, 18.7:9 aspect ratio "FullView" displays with a "notch" tab at the top-centre, with the P20 having a 5.8-inch LCD panel and the P20 Pro a 6.1-inch AMOLED panel. Both models include a Kirin 970 system-on-chip and 128 GB of non-expandable internal storage, with 4 GB of RAM for the base model and 6 for the Pro. The models feature 3320 and 4000 mAh batteries respectively; the P20 line does not support wireless charging. Both models have a USB-C port and do not include a headphone jack.

Both models feature rear-facing Leica cameras. The P20 features a 12-megapixel colour sensor, while the P20 Pro features two cameras—a 40-megapixel wide-angle IMX600 sensor, and an 8-megapixel sensor with 3x optical zoom. By default, output from "quad pixels" on the P20 Pro's 40-megapixel sensor is pixel binned into 10-megapixel photos ("Light Fusion", similar to Nokia PureView's "pixel oversampling"), which is used to improve image quality and the brightness of low-light images, or for intentional monochrome photography. The camera configurations of both models additionally feature a 20-megapixel monochrome sensor, whose output can be used to help improve image quality. The camera software leverages artificial intelligence technologies such as object recognition for stabilization and performing automated enhancements to images (recognizing common scenes and photo subjects), while information from the various sensors and infrared is used for autofocus. The 24-megapixel front-facing camera also uses Light Fusion.

=== Software ===
The P20 ships with Android 8.1 "Oreo" with Google Mobile Services and Huawei's EMUI interface and software suite. In December 2018, Huawei began to roll out an upgrade to Android 9.0 "Pie" with EMUI 9.0, adding features such as screen gesture-based navigation, Digital Balance (a dashboard for tracking and limiting device usage), HiVision (an augmented reality object recognition experience for the camera), and Password Vault among other features.

In mid-2019, the P20 received a system update with EMUI 9.1 (introduced on its successor, the P30), which features performance improvements, including use of Huawei's Extendable Read-Only File System (EROFS) for system partitions), updates to the GPU Turbo mode, and other refinements. An update to Android 10 and EMUI 10 was later released; it is not planned to be updated to EMUI 10.1.

== Reception ==
CNET praised the design of the P20 Pro, noting that its "Twilight" color finish was reminiscent of when phones "dared to look different" in the early 2000s, but that its glass backing was likely to attract fingerprints. The P20 Pro's cameras were deemed to be competitive with other high-end devices, with low-light images being "consistently detailed", and having quality that exceeded those of the Samsung Galaxy S9+. However, it was argued that the automatic enhancement mode often resulted in oversaturated and unnatural-looking photos. NDTV noted that the P20 range lacked wireless charging or a 1440p display like its competition, and that the P20 Pro's Kirin 970 system-on-chip was comparable to the Snapdragon 835, but slightly behind the Exynos 9810 of the Samsung Galaxy S9 on CPU benchmarks. On graphics benchmarks, the P20 Pro was shown to have a frame rate advantage over its competitors due to its lower resolution. In conclusion, the S9 was deemed to be a better "all-round" phone, but the P20 Pro was best for users who wanted the "most versatile" cameras of a current smartphone.

The Verge similarly praised its design for having many subtle details and a "satisfying sense of density that only Apple's iPhone X can match". Its display was considered to be competitive with those of the iPhone X and Galaxy S9, also noting its inclusion of display temperature adjustment based on lighting conditions, similarly to Apple's "True Tone" feature. Huawei's software was considered to be less "irritating" than Samsung Experience, and maturing beyond being a clone of iOS, although bugs were noted in its handling of the display notch on the stock software. The P20 Pro's cameras were deemed the company's best to-date, to have "shockingly impressive low-light performance" (outperforming the Pixel 2), and a long-exposure "Night" mode that "somehow manages to produce handheld photos that remain sharp, accurate, and practically noise-free", but noting Huawei's aggressive post-processing, and that the "Master AI" mode was inconsistent. In conclusion, it was argued that "Instead of gimmicks and gaudiness, the Huawei P20 Pro delivers refinement and efficiency. That's a major change for Huawei, which could previously be relied upon to be the fastest iPhone copycat in the East."

DxOMark found that the P20 Pro's cameras were "the biggest innovation we have seen in mobile imaging for quite some time" and "particularly good in low light, when zooming, and for bokeh simulation". Rating it on its camera benchmarks with a score of 109, it was, at the time, the highest score the site had ever awarded.
