= Huawei P30 lite =

2019 Huawei smartphone

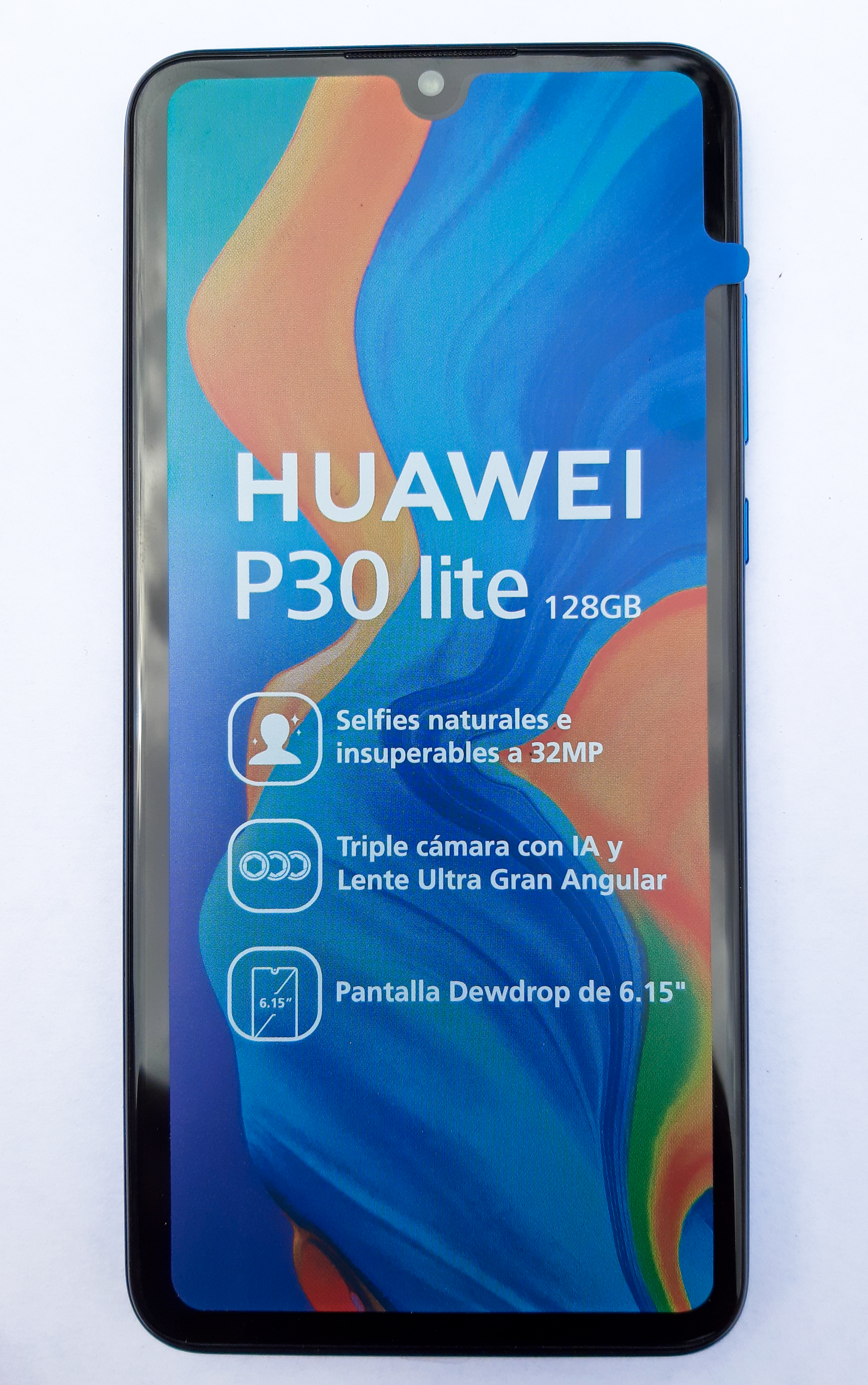
- Manufacturer: Huawei
- Type: Smartphone
- Series: Pura (formally known as the P series)
- First released: March 14, 2019
- Availability by region: Philippines: March 27, 2019; India: April 9, 2019
- Predecessor: Huawei P20 lite
- Successor: Huawei P40 lite
- Compatible networks: GSM; HSDPA; LTE
- Colors: Peacock Blue, Midnight Black, Pearl White, breathing crystal
- Dimensions: 152.9 mm (6.02 in) H 72.7 mm (2.86 in) W 7.4 mm (0.29 in) D
- Weight: 159 g (5.6 oz)
- Operating system: Android 9.0 (Pie), upgradable to Android 10, EMUI 10.0
- CPU: HiSilicon Kirin 710
- GPU: ARM Mali-G51 MP4 GPU
- Memory: 4 GB/6 GB (depends if its a new edition )
- Storage: 128 GB/256 GB (depends if its a new edition )
- Removable storage: MicroSD, up to 512 GB
- Battery: 3340 mAh
- Charging: 18W wired
- Rear camera: 48 MP, f/1.8 (wide) autofocus, 8 MP (ultrawide), 2 MP, f/2.4 (depth sensor)
- Front camera: 24 MP, f/2.0
- Display: 6.15", LTPS IPS LCD; 16.7M colors Full HD; 2312 х 1080

The Huawei P30 lite is a smartphone developed by Huawei, officially introduced on March 26, 2019, at an official event in Beijing. Another name for this model is the Nova 4e announced on March 14, 2019 before being rebranded globally and in markets like the Philippines, where pre-orders opened on March 27, 2019.

In India, the device was released on April 9, 2019.

== Specifications ==
=== Design ===
While the display features a slightly wider bezel, it retains the teardrop camera notch at the top, alongside a USB-C port, speaker grille, and a 3.5 mm audio jack along the bottom edge. The rear panel houses a similar triple-camera array, though the primary physical differentiator is the rear-mounted capacitive fingerprint sensor. To maintain a lower price point, the device omits the in-display optical scanner found on higher-end models, such as the standard Huawei P30, in favor of a traditional rear sensor that offers faster authentication speeds. The smartphone was released in three color finishes: Pearl White, Peacock Blue, and Midnight Black.

=== Hardware ===
The device features a mid-range Kirin 710 system-on-chip, an ARM Mali-G51 MP4 GPU, some memory configurations of 4 GB or 6 GB of RAM, 128 GB of expandable storage, and a 6.15-inch Full HD+ (2321 × 1080) display with a waterdrop notch.

=== Cameras ===
The primary hardware feature of the P30 Lite is its rear triple-camera array, consisting of a 24-megapixel primary sensor (f/1.8), an 8-megapixel ultra-wide-angle lens (f/2.4) with a 120-degree field of view, and a 2-megapixel depth sensor. The front-facing camera utilizes a 32-megapixel sensor, matching the resolution found on higher-end models in the P30 series.

Additional technical specifications include a 3,340 mAh battery supporting 18 W fast charging via USB-C, a rear-mounted capacitive fingerprint scanner, and software support for GPU Turbo 2.0.

The Huawei P30 Lite runs on the Android 9.0 (Pie) operating system with the EMUI 9.0 custom skin. It was updated to EMUI 10 based on Android 10.

== Huawei P30 lite New Edition ==
Huawei P30 lite New Edition is a re-released Huawei P30 lite from 2020. The main differences compared to the 2019 version are a single memory configuration of 6/256 GB and a faster memory type of UFS 2.1 instead of eMMC 5.1. Google Play services also remained present in the new version.

== Reception ==
=== New Edition ===
The Huawei P30 Lite New Edition is available in several color variants, including "Breathing Crystal"—a lighter gradient option—alongside traditional Peacock Blue, Midnight Black, and Pearl White finishes, with specific color availability varying by region. Weighing 159 grams, the device is notably lightweight relative to comparable smartphones in its market segment, though its physical dimensions reflect standard form factors of modern mid-range smartphones.

The device retains the design of its predecessor, featuring a front-facing waterdrop notch and narrow display bezels. The rear-facing camera module protrudes noticeably from the chassis, causing instability when the device is operated on a flat surface.

While the general build quality is robust, localized pressure applied to the front panel can induce temporary display artifacts. The chassis is designed for ergonomic handling, though it lacks an official Ingress Protection (IP) rating for dust and water resistance.
