= Huawei Nova 7 =

2020 Android smartphone by Huawei

- Manufacturer: Huawei
- Type: Phablet
- Series: Nova
- First released: April 23, 2020; 6 years ago
- Availability by region: April 14, 2020; 6 years ago
- Predecessor: Huawei Nova 6
- Successor: Huawei Nova 8
- Related: Huawei Nova 7 Pro, Huawei Nova 7i
- Form factor: Smartphone
- Colors: Midnight black, Crush green, Sakura pink
- Dimensions: 160.6 x 74.3 x 8 mm (6.32 x 2.93 x 0.31 in)
- Weight: 180 g (6 oz)
- Operating system: Android 10, EMUI 10
- System-on-chip: Huawei Kirin 985 5G
- CPU: Octa-core (1x2.58 GHz Cortex-A76 & 3x2.40 GHz Cortex-A76 & 4x1.84 GHz Cortex-A55)
- GPU: Mali-G77(8 core)
- Memory: 8 GB RAM
- Storage: 128GB, 256GB
- Removable storage: None
- SIM: nanoSIM
- Battery: 4000 mAh
- Charging: Huawei Supercharge 40w
- Rear camera: 64 MP, f/1.8, 26mm (wide), PDAF 8 MP, f/2.4, 80mm (telephoto), PDAF, 3x optical zoom 8 MP, f/2.4, 17mm (ultrawide) 2 MP, f/2.4, (macro) laser autofocus, AI filter, aperture, 1080p resolution
- Front camera: 16 MP (wide) aperture, exposure control, face detection
- Connectivity: Wi-Fi a/b/g/n/ac (2.4 GHz), Bluetooth 5.1, GPS, LTE, USB-C 2.0
- Website: consumer.huawei.com/en/phones/nova7/

The Huawei Nova 7 is an Android smartphone manufactured by Huawei and released in 2020. It spots a 6.53-inch display with a 20:9 aspect ratio.

== Specifications ==
=== Display and camera ===
Huawei Nova 7 has a 6.53-inch FHD+ display with a screen resolution of 1,080 x 2,400 pixels, 403 PPI pixel density and 20:9 aspect ratio. This phone has four cameras 64 MP, f/1.8, 26mm (wide), 8 MP, f/2.4, (ultrawide), 8 MP, f/2.4, (telephoto), 2 MP, f/2.4, (macro) with PDAF and dual flash. The front camera is 16MP with a wide angle.

=== Storage and configuration ===
The phone comes with a non-expandable 128GB/256GB of internal storage (eMMC 5.1) and 8GB of RAM, This device is powered by Huawei's own Hi Silicon Kirin 985 chipset with specifications: Octa-core (1x2.58 GHz Cortex-A76 & 3x2.40 GHz Cortex-A76 & 4x1.84 GHz Cortex-A55). It also has an under-display fingerprint scanner for improved security.

=== Software ===
The Nova 7 is launched with Android 10 and Huawei's EMUI 10. It has no Google Play Services preinstalled.
