= Huawei P40 lite E =

2020 smartphone

Huawei P40 lite E (Huawei Y7p) Huawei Enjoy 10
- Brand: Huawei
- Manufacturer: Huawei
- Type: Smartphone
- Series: Huawei P series, Y series, Enjoy series
- First released: Enjoy 10: October 18, 2019; P40 lite E: February 2020
- Predecessor: Huawei Y7 (2019)
- Successor: Huawei Y7a (P40 lite E); Huawei Enjoy 20 (Enjoy 10)
- Compatible networks: GSM, HSDPA, LTE
- Form factor: Slate
- Dimensions: 159.81×76.13×8.13 mm (6.292×2.997×0.320 in)
- Weight: 176 g (6 oz)
- Operating system: P40 lite E: Original: Android 9 Pie with EMUI 9 Current: Android 9 Pie with EMUI 9.1; Enjoy 10: Original: Android 9 Pie with EMUI 9.1; Current: HarmonyOS 2.0
- CPU: HiSilicon [Kirin 710F (12 nm)
- Memory: P40 lite E: 4 GB; Enjoy 10: 4/6 GB
- Storage: P40 lite E: 64 GB; Enjoy 10: 64/128 GB
- Removable storage: microSDXC up to 512 GB
- Battery: 4000 mAh
- Charging: 10 W
- Rear camera: P40 lite E: 48 MP (wide); 8 MP (ultrawide); 2 MP (depth); Enjoy 10: 48 MP (wide); 2 MP (depth)
- Front camera: 8 MP, f/2.0
- Display: 6.39 in, IPS LCD, 720p (1560 × 720), 16.7M colors
- Connectivity: Wi-Fi (802.11b/g/n), Bluetooth 5.0
- Other: Ambient light sensor, compass, fingerprint sensor, face unlock, gyroscope

The Huawei P40 lite E is a smartphone developed by Huawei. It was announced for the global market in February 2020 alongside the Huawei P40 lite. In certain markets, the device is branded as the Huawei Y7p. In China, the device was sold as the Huawei Enjoy 10 in TENAA, which differs from the P40 lite E in its available color options and camera configuration.

== Specifications ==
=== Design & build ===
The body of the devices is constructed entirely of plastic with an imitation glass finish and lacks a metal frame. A circular cutout for the front-facing camera is located in the upper-left corner of the display. On the Enjoy 10, an LED flash is positioned where the P40 lite E features its third camera lens. The screen is nearly bezel-less, accounting for approximately 90% of the front panel.

==== Colors ====
The P40 lite E is available in two colors: Midnight Black and Aurora Blue, while the Huawei Enjoy 10 was available in four color options: Aurora Blue, Acacia Red, Magic Night Black, and Sky Blue.

=== Hardware ===
The smartphones are equipped with an octa-core HiSilicon Kirin 710F processor, consisting of four Cortex-A73 cores clocked at 2.2 GHz and four Cortex-A53 cores at 1.7 GHz. The graphics are handled by a Mali G51-MP4 GPU. The device features a 6.39-inch IPS LCD display with a resolution of 1520 × 720 (720p), an aspect ratio of 19.5:9, and a pixel density of 269 ppi. The P40 lite E comes with 64 GB of internal storage and 4 GB of RAM. The Enjoy 10 offers several configurations: 4/64 GB, 6/64 GB, and 4/128 GB. Storage can be expanded via a microSD card up to 512 GB. The battery is a non-removable 4000 mAh Li-Po unit. It does not support fast charging, with a standard charging rate of 10 W.

==== Camera ====
The Huawei P40 lite E features a triple rear camera setup:

- 48 MP (f/1.8, wide-angle)
- 8 MP (f/2.4, ultrawide)
- 2 MP (f/2.4, depth sensor)

The Huawei Enjoy 10 features a dual rear camera setup:

- 48 MP (f/1.8, wide-angle)
- 2 MP (f/2.4, depth sensor)

Both models include an 8 MP (f/2.0) front-facing camera capable of hardware-based bokeh effects. Video recording is supported at 1080p.

=== Software ===
The devices originally launched with Android 9 Pie and the EMUI 9.1 interface, but does not support Google Mobile Services. The Enjoy 10 has been updated to HarmonyOS 2.0. Prior to EMUI 10.1 update, the P40 lite E received multiple security updates from October to December 2021.

The smartphone supports 4G LTE, Bluetooth 5.0, and Wi-Fi 802.11 b/g/n. Navigation is provided via GPS, A-GPS, and GLONASS. It retains a 3.5 mm headphone jack and uses a Micro-USB port for charging and data transfer.

== See also ==
- Huawei P40
- Huawei P Smart S
