= Huawei Nova 7i =

Android-based smartphone developed by smartphone

Huawei Nova 7i (Also known as Huawei P40 lite and Nova 6 SE)
- Manufacturer: Huawei
- Type: Smartphone
- Series: Huawei Nova
- First released: January 30, 2020; 6 years ago
- Predecessor: Huawei Nova 5i Huawei P30 lite
- Successor: Huawei Nova 8i Huawei Nova 7 SE
- Related: Huawei Nova 7 Huawei Nova 7 Pro; Huawei P40; Huawei P40 lite E Huawei P40 lite 5G; Huawei Nova 6
- Form factor: Smartphone
- Colors: Midnight Black, Crush Green, Sakura Pink
- Dimensions: 159.2 mm (6.27 in) H76.3 mm (3.00 in) W8.7 mm (0.34 in) D
- Weight: 183 g
- Operating system: Original: Android 10.0 "Pie", EMUI 10; Current: EMUI 12 (Global) and HarmonyOS 2 (China)
- System-on-chip: Huawei Kirin 810
- GPU: Mali-G52
- Memory: 8 GB RAM
- Storage: 128GB, UFS 2.1
- Removable storage: NM (Nano Memory), up to 256GB (uses shared SIM slot)
- Battery: 4200 mAh
- Charging: Fast charging up to 40W Huawei Supercharge
- Rear camera: 48 MP, f/1.8 (wide); 8 MP, f/2.4 (ultrawide); 2 MP, f/2.4 (macro); 2 MP, f/2.4 (depth) laser autofocus, AI filter, video recording at 30 FPS or 60 FPS, slow-motion video recording at 1080p, timelapse with stabilization, panorama, optical image stabilization, LED flash
- Front camera: 16 MP, f/2.0 aperture (wide), exposure control, face detection
- Sound: 3.5mm jack
- Connectivity: Wi-Fi b/g/n/ac (2.4 GHz), dual-band, Wi-Fi Direct, hotspot Bluetooth 4.2; GPS, LTE, USB Type-C 2.0, USB On-The-Go, NFC
- Website: consumer.huawei.com/levant/phones/nova-7i/specs/

The Huawei Nova 7i is an Android smartphone manufactured by Huawei as part of its mid-range Nova series. The phone was released on 14 February 2020.

== Specifications ==
=== Display and camera ===
Huawei Nova 7i has a 6.4-inch IPS LCD screen with a 1080p resolution and a 19.5:9 aspect ratio. It has a total of five cameras: 48MP, 8MP, 2MP, 2MP with PDAF and flash on the back and 16MP on the front.

=== Storage and configuration ===
The phone comes with 128GB of internal storage, which can be expanded up to 256GB. It is powered by Huawei's HiSilicon Kirin 810 (7 nm) chipset paired with 8GB of RAM. It has a side-mounted fingerprint scanner for improved security.

=== Battery and connectivity ===
The phone comes with a 4200 mAh Li-ion battery, a USB-C charging port, and a 3.5 mm audio jack for wired headphones. It supports 4G connectivity.

=== Software ===
The phone was shipped with Android 10 overlaid with Huawei's EMUI 10. However, the phone is now upgradeable to Huawei's EMUI 12.

=== Color variants ===
This model comes in three colours: Midnight Black, Crush Green, Sakura Pink
