= List of Huawei products =

Huawei Brand logo

The following is a list of Huawei products, such as smartphones, tablets, laptops, wearable devices, TVs and others. The date in brackets is the date of initial release.

== Smartphones ==
=== A-LA ===
Model	Version	Launch date	Discontinued?
Ascend	M680	October 2010	Yes
Ascend	II	July 2011	Yes

=== G series ===
List of G series phones (discontinued)

- Huawei Ascend G300 (2012)
- Huawei Ascend G312 (2012)
- Huawei Ascend G330 (2012)
- Huawei Ascend G510-0010 (2013)
- Huawei Ascend G525 (2013)
- Huawei Ascend G526 (2013)
- Huawei Ascend G535 (2014)
- Huawei Ascend g750 u10 (2012)
- Huawei Ascend G6 (2014)
- Huawei Ascend G610 (2013)
- Huawei Ascend G615 (2013)
- Huawei Ascend G620s (2014)
- Huawei Ascend G630 (2014)
- Huawei Ascend G7 (2014)
- Huawei Ascend G700 (2013)
- Huawei Ascend G740 (2013)
- Huawei G Play (2015, known as Honor 4X)
- Huawei G Play Mini (2015, known as Honor 4C)
- Huawei G8 (G7 Plus in China) (2015)
- Huawei G9 lite (P9 lite) (2016)
- Huawei G9 Plus (2016, the Chinese version of Huawei Nova Plus)
- Huawei GR3 (2016, Huawei Enjoy 5S in China)
- Huawei GR5 (2016, known as Honor 5X)
- Huawei GR5 2017 (known as Honor 6X)
- Huawei GR3 2017
- Huawei GT3 (known as GR5 mini, Honor 5C and Honor 7 Lite)

=== Mate series ===
- Huawei Ascend Mate (2013)
- Huawei Ascend Mate 2 (4G) (2014)
- Huawei Ascend Mate 7
- Huawei Mate S (2015)
- Huawei Mate SE (2017)
- Huawei Mate 8 (2015)
- Huawei Mate 9 (2016)
- Huawei Mate 9 Lite (also called Honor 6X)
- Huawei Mate 9 Pro (2016)
- Huawei Mate 10 (2017)
- Huawei Mate 10 Pro (2017)
- Huawei Mate 10 Lite [also known as Huawei Nova 2i or Huawei Maimang 6 or Honor 9i (in India)] (2017)
- Huawei Mate 20 (2018)
- Huawei Mate 20 Pro (2018)
- Huawei Mate 20 Lite (2018)
- Huawei Mate 20 X (2018)
- Huawei Mate 30 (2019)
- Huawei Mate 30 Pro (2019)
- Huawei Mate 30 (5G) (2019)
- Huawei Mate 30 Pro (5G) (2019)
- Huawei Mate 30E Pro 5G (2020)
- Huawei Mate 30 RS (2019)
- Huawei Mate 40 (2020)
- Huawei Mate 40 Pro (2020)
- Huawei Mate 40 Pro+ (2020)
- Huawei Mate 40 RS (2020)
- Huawei Mate 40E (2021)
- Huawei Mate 40E 4G (2021)
- Huawei Mate 40 Pro 4G (2021)
- Huawei Mate 50 (2022)
- Huawei Mate 50 Pro (2022)
- Huawei Mate 60 (2023)
- Huawei Mate 60 Pro (2023)
- Huawei Mate 60 Pro+ (2023)
- Huawei Mate 70 (2024)
- Huawei Mate 70 Pro (2024)
- Huawei Mate 70 Pro+ (2024)
- Huawei Mate 70 Air (2025)
- Huawei Mate 80 (2025)
- Huawei Mate 80 Pro (2025)
- Huawei Mate 80 Pro Max (2025)
- Huawei Mate 90 (2026)
- Huawei Mate 90 Pro (2026)
- Huawei Mate 90 Pro Max (2026)
- Huawei Mate X (2019)
- Huawei Mate Xs (2020)
- Huawei Mate X2 (2021)
- Huawei Mate X2 4G (2021)
- Huawei Mate Xs2 (2022)
- Huawei Mate X3 (2023)
- Huawei Mate X5 (2023)
- Huawei Mate X6 (2024)
- Huawei Mate X7 (2025)

=== Porsche design/Ultimate design ===
- Huawei Porsche Design Mate 9
- Huawei Porsche Design Mate 10 (2017)
- Huawei Porsche Design Mate RS (2018)
- Huawei Mate 20 Porsche RS (2018)
- Huawei Mate 50 RS Porsche Design (2022)
- Huawei Mate 60 RS Ultimate Design (2023)
- Huawei Mate XT Ultimate Design (2024)
- Huawei Mate 70 RS Ultimate Design (2024)
- Huawei Mate XTs Ultimate Design (2025)
- Huawei Mate 80 RS Ultimate Design (2025)
- Huawei Mate XT 2 Ultimate Design (2026)
- Huawei Mate 90 RS Ultimate Design (2026)

=== Pura series ===
- Huawei Ascend P1 (2012, discontinued)
- Huawei Ascend P1 LTE (2012, discontinued)
- Huawei Ascend P1 S (2012, discontinued)
- Huawei Ascend P1 XL (2012, discontinued)
- Huawei Ascend P2 (2013, discontinued)
- Huawei Ascend P6 (2013, discontinued)
- Huawei Ascend P7 (2014)
- Huawei Ascend P7 mini (2014, discontinued)
- Huawei Ascend P7 Sapphire Edition (2014, discontinued)
- Huawei P8 (2015, discontinued)
- Huawei P8 Max (2015, discontinued)
- Huawei P8 lite (2015, discontinued)
- Huawei P8 lite (Honor 8 Lite / P9 Lite 2017 / Nova Lite / GR3 2017) (2017, discontinued)
- Huawei P9 (2016, discontinued)
- Huawei P9 lite (Huawei G9) (2016, discontinued)
- Huawei P9 lite mini (2017, discontinued) (Nova Lite 2017)
- Huawei P9 Plus (2016, discontinued)
- Huawei P10 (2017, discontinued)
- Huawei P10 Plus (2017, discontinued)
- Huawei P10 lite (Nova Youth) (2017, discontinued)
- Huawei P Smart (2017, discontinued)
- Huawei P Smart Pro (2018, discontinued)
- Huawei P20 (2018, discontinued)
- Huawei P20 Pro (2018, discontinued)
- Huawei P20 lite (also called Nova 3e) (2018, discontinued)
- Huawei P Smart + (Nova 3i) (2018, discontinued)
- Huawei P Smart (2019, discontinued)
- Huawei P Smart Z (2019, discontinued)
- Huawei P30 (2019, discontinued)
- Huawei P30 Pro (2019, discontinued)
- Huawei P30 lite (2019, discontinued) (known as Nova 4e)
- Huawei P30 New Edition (2020, discontinued)
- Huawei P30 lite New Edition (2020, discontinued)
- Huawei P Smart (2020, discontinued)
- Huawei P Smart S (2020, discontinued) (known as Enjoy 10s / Y8p)
- Huawei P40 (2020, discontinued)
- Huawei P40 lite (2020, discontinued) (known as Nova 6 SE / Nova 7i)
- Huawei P40 lite E (2020, discontinued) (known as Y7p)
- Huawei P40 Pro (2020, discontinued)
- Huawei P40 Pro+ (2020, discontinued)
- Huawei P40 lite 5G (2020, discontinued) (known as Nova 7 SE)
- Huawei P40 4G (2021, discontinued)
- Huawei P Smart 2021 (2020, discontinued) (known as Y7a, models PPA-LX1 and PPA-LX2)
- Huawei P50 (2021, discontinued)
- Huawei P50 Pro (2021, discontinued)
- Huawei P50 Pocket (2021)
- Huawei P50E (2022)
- Huawei P60 (2023)
- Huawei P60 Pro (2023)
- Huawei P60 Art (2023)
- Huawei Pura70 (2024)
- Huawei Pura70 Pro (2024)
- Huawei Pura70 Pro+ (2024)
- Huawei Pura70 Ultra (2024)
- Huawei Pura X (2025)
- Huawei Pura80 (2025)
- Huawei Pura80 Pro (2025)
- Huawei Pura80 Pro+ (2025)
- Huawei Pura80 Ultra (2025)
- Huawei Pura90 (2026)
- Huawei Pura90 Pro (2026)
- Huawei Pura90 Pro Max (2026)
- Huawei Pura X Max (2026)
- Huawei Pura X View (2026)

=== Pocket series ===
- Huawei Pocket S (2022)
- Huawei Pocket 2 (2024)

=== Ascend W series ===
List of W series phones (discontinued)

- Huawei Ascend W1 (2013)
- Huawei Ascend W2 (2013)

=== Ascend Y series/Y series ===
List of Y series phones (discontinued)

- Huawei Ascend Y (2012)
- Huawei Ascend Y100 (2012)
- Huawei Ascend Y200 (2012)
- Huawei Ascend Y201
- Huawei Ascend Y201 Pro (2012)
- Huawei Ascend Y210D (2013)
- Huawei Ascend Y220 (2014)
- Huawei Ascend Y221 (2014)
- Huawei Ascend Y300 (2013)
- Huawei Y300II (2014)
- Huawei Ascend Y320 (2013)
- Huawei Ascend Y321
- Huawei Ascend Y330 (2014)
- Huawei Ascend Y511 (2013)
- Huawei Ascend Y520 (2014)
- Huawei Ascend Y530 (2014)
- Huawei Ascend Y540 (2015)
- Huawei Ascend Y550 (2014)
- Huawei Y635 (2015)

Model	Released	Processor	Internal storage	RAM	Rear Camera	Front Camera	Charging Speed	Battery
Y360 (also known as Y3)	March 2015	MediaTek MT6582	4 GB	512 MB	5 MP	2 MP	2.75 W	1730 mAh
Y560 (also known as Y5)	June 2015	Snapdragon 210	8 GB	1 GB	5 MP	2 MP	5 W	2000 mAh
Y5c (also known as Honor Bee in India)	July 2015	Spreadtrum SC7731	8 GB	1 GB	8 MP	2 MP	5 W	1730 mAh
Y6 (also known as Honor 4A in China)	July 2015	Snapdragon 210	8 GB	1/2 GB	8 MP	2 MP	5 W	2200 mAh
Y6 Pro (also known as Enjoy 5 and Honor Play 5X)	October 2015	Mediatek MT6735P	16 GB	2 GB	13 MP	5 MP	10 W	4000 mAh
Y3 II	April 2016	MediaTek MT6582M	8 GB	1 GB	5 MP	2 MP		2100 mAh
Y5 II (also known as Honor 5)	April 2016	MediaTek MT6582	8 GB	1 GB	8 MP	2 MP		2200 mAh
Y6 II (also known as Honor Holly 3 in India and Honor 5A in Malaysia)	August 2016	Kirin 620	16 GB	2 GB	13 MP	8 MP	10 W	3100 mAh
Y6 II Compact (also known as Honor 5A)	September 2016	Mediatek MT6735	16 GB	2 GB	13 MP	5 MP	10 W	2200 mAh
Y3 2017 (also known as Y5 lite 2017 in Latin America)	May 2017	MediaTek MT6737M MT6580M	8/32 GB	1 GB	8 MP	2 MP		2200 mAh
Y5 2017	April 2017	MediaTek MT6737T	16 GB	2 GB	8 MP	5 MP		3000 mAh
Y6 2017 (also known as Nova Young in Italy)	May 2017	MediaTek MT6737T	16 GB	2 GB	13 MP	5 MP	10 W	3000 mAh
Y7 (also known as Ascend XT2 in the US and Nova Lite+ in Italy)	May 2017	Snapdragon 435	16 GB	2 GB	13 MP	8 MP	10 W	4000 mAh
Y7 Prime (also known as Enjoy 7 Plus in China and Honor Holly 4 Plus in India)	June 2017	Snapdragon 435	32 GB	3 GB	13 MP	8 MP	10 W	4000 mAh
Y6 Pro 2017 (also known as Nova lite 2017 and P9 lite mini)	October 2017	Snapdragon 425	16 GB	2 GB	13 MP	5 MP	10 W	3020 mAh
Y7 2018	March 2018	Snapdragon 430	16 GB	2 GB	13 MP	8 MP	10 W	3000 mAh
Y7 Prime 2018 (also known as Enjoy 8 in China and Nova 2 lite)	March 2018	Snapdragon 430	32/64 GB	3/4 GB	13 MP 2 MP (depth)	8 MP	10 W	3000 mAh
Y7 Pro 2018	March 2018	Snapdragon 430	32 GB	3 GB	13 MP 2 MP (depth)	8 MP	10 W	3000 mAh
Y9 2018 (also known as Enjoy 8 Plus in China)	March 2018	Kirin 659	32/64/128 GB	3/4 GB	16 MP (wide) 2 MP (depth)	13 MP (wide) 2 MP (depth)	10 W	4000 mAh
Y6 2018	April 2018	Snapdragon 425	16 GB	2/3 GB	13 MP	5 MP	10 W	3000 mAh
Y6 Prime 2018	April 2018	Snapdragon 425	16/32 GB	2/3 GB	13 MP	8 MP	10 W	3000 mAh
Y3 2018	May 2018	MT6737M	8 GB	1 GB	8 MP	2 MP		2280 mAh
Y5 Prime 2018 (also known as Enjoy 8e Youth)	May 2018	MediaTek MT6739	16/32 GB	2 GB	13 MP	5 MP		3020 mAh
Y5 2018	June 2018	MediaTek MT6739	16 GB	1/2 GB	8 MP	5 MP		3020 mAh
Y5 lite	December 2018	MediaTek MT6739	16 GB	1 GB	8 MP	5 MP		3020 mAh
Y9 2019 (also known as Enjoy 9 Plus in China)	October 2018	Kirin 710	64/128 GB	3/4/6 GB	13 MP (wide) 2 MP (depth)	16 MP (wide) 2 MP (depth)	10 W	4000 mAh
Y Max (also known as Enjoy Max in China)	November 2018	Snapdragon 660	64/128 GB	4 GB	16 MP 2 MP (depth)	8 MP	10 W	5000 mAh
Y7 Prime 2019	January 2019	Qualcomm Snapdragon 450	32/64 GB	3 GB	13 MP 2 MP (depth)	16 MP	10 W	4000 mAh
Y7 Pro 2019	January 2019	Qualcomm Snapdragon 450	32/64/128 GB	3/4 GB	13 MP 2 MP (depth)	16 MP	10 W	4000 mAh
Y6 2019	February 2019	MediaTek Helio A22	32 GB	2 GB	13 MP	8 MP	10 W	3020 mAh
Y6 Pro 2019	February 2019	MediaTek Helio A22	32 GB	3 GB	13 MP	8 MP	10 W	3020 mAh
Y7 2019	March 2019	Snapdragon 450	32/64 GB	3/4 GB	13 MP 2 MP (depth)	8 MP	10 W	4000 mAh
Y6 Prime 2019	March 2019	MediaTek Helio A22	64 GB	3 GB	13 MP	8 MP	10 W	3020 mAh
Y5 2019	April 2019	MediaTek Helio A22	16/32 GB	2 GB	13 MP	5 MP		3020 mAh
Y9 Prime 2019	August 2019	Kirin 710F	64/128 GB	4 GB	16 MP (wide) 8 MP (ultrawide) 2 MP (depth)	16 MP	10 W	4000 mAh
Y6s (also known as Honor 8A, Honor 8A Pro, Honor 8A Prime and Honor 8A 2020)	January 2020	MediaTek Helio P35	32/64 GB	3 GB	13 MP	8 MP	10 W	3020 mAh
Y7p (also known as P40 lite E)	February 2020	Kirin 710F	64 GB	4 GB	48 MP (wide) 8 MP (ultrawide) 2 MP (depth)	8 MP	10 W	4000 mAh
Y5p (also known as Honor 9S)	May 2020	MediaTek Helio P22	32 GB	2 GB	8 MP	5 MP	10 W	3020 mAh
Y6p	May 2020	MediaTek Helio P22	32/64 GB	3/4 GB	13 MP (wide) 5 MP (ultrawide) 2 MP (depth)	8 MP	10 W	5000 mAh
Y8s	May 2020	Kirin 710	64/128 GB	4 GB	48 MP (wide) 2 MP (depth)	8 MP (wide) 2 MP (depth)	10 W	4000 mAh
Y8p	May 2020	Kirin 710F	128 GB	4/6 GB	48 MP (wide) 8 MP (ultrawide) 2 MP (depth)	16 MP	10 W	4000 mAh
Y9a (also known as Nova Y9a)	September 2020	MediaTek Helio G80	128 GB	6/8 GB	64 MP (wide) 8 MP (ultrawide) 2 MP (macro) 2 MP (depth)	16 MP	22.5 W HUAWEI Supercharge	4200 mAh
Y9a (also known as Nova Y9a)	September 2020	MediaTek Helio G80	128 GB	6/8 GB	64 MP (wide) 8 MP (ultrawide) 2 MP (macro) 2 MP (depth)	16 MP	40 W HUAWEI Supercharge	4300 mAh
Y7a (also known as P Smart 2021 in Europe and Honor 10X Lite)	October 2020	Kirin 710A	64/128 GB	4 GB	48 MP (wide) 8 MP (ultrawide) 2 MP (macro) 2 MP (depth)	8 MP	22.5 W HUAWEI Supercharge	5000 mAh

=== Nova series ===
The Nova series is aimed at mobile selfie enthusiasts

List of Nova series phones

Model	Year released	Processor	Internal storage	RAM	Rear camera	Front camera	Charging	Battery Capacity	5G Connectivity
Nova	October 2016	Snapdragon 625	32 GB	3 GB	12 MP	8 MP	18 W HUAWEI Quick Charge	3020 mAh	No
Nova Plus (also known as G9 Plus and Maimang 5)	October 2016	Snapdragon 625	32 GB	3 GB	16 MP	8 MP	18 W HUAWEI Quick Charge	3340 mAh	No
Nova lite (also known as P8 lite 2017, P9 lite 2017 and Honor 8 Lite)	February 2017	Kirin 655	16/32/64 GB	3/4 GB	12 MP	8 MP		3000 mAh	No
Nova Smart (also known as Enjoy 6S and Honor 6C)	April 2017	Snapdragon 435	16 GB	2 GB	13 MP	5 MP		3020 mAh	No
Nova Youth (also known as P10 lite)	May 2017	Kirin 658	32/64 GB	3/4 GB	12 MP	8 MP	18 W HUAWEI Quick Charge	3000 mAh	No
Nova lite+ (also known as Y7)	August 2017	Snapdragon 435	16 GB	2 GB	12 MP	8 MP		4000 mAh	No
Nova Young (P10 lite)	August 2017	MT6737T	16 GB	2 GB	13 MP	5 MP		3000 mAh	No
Nova lite 2017 (also known as P9 lite mini and Y6 Pro 2017)	August 2017	Snapdragon 425	16 GB	2 GB	13 MP	5 MP		3020 mAh	No
Nova lite 3 (also known as P Smart 2019)	January 2019	Kirin 710	32 GB	3 GB	13 MP 2 MP (depth)	8 MP	10 W	3400 mAh	No
Nova lite 3+ (also known as P Smart 2020)	May 2020	Kirin 710	128 GB	4 GB	13 MP 2 MP (depth)	8 MP	10 W	3400 mAh	No
Nova 2	June 2017	Kirin 659	64 GB	4 GB	12 MP 8 MP	20 MP	18 W HUAWEI Quick Charge	2950 mAh	No
Nova 2 Plus	June 2017	Kirin 659	64/128 GB	4 GB	12 MP 8 MP	20 MP	18 W HUAWEI Quick Charge	3340 mAh	No
Nova 2i (Also known as Mate 10 lite, Maimang 6 & Honor 9i India)	March 2018	Snapdragon 430	64 GB	4 GB	16 MP (wide) 2 MP (depth)	13 MP (wide) 2 MP (depth)		3000 mAh	No
Nova 2s	December 2017	Kirin 960	64/128 GB	4/6 GB	16 MP 20 MP (B/W, wide)	32 MP (wide) 2 MP (depth)	18 W HUAWEI Quick Charge	3340 mAh	No
Nova 2 lite (also known as Y7 Prime 2018)	March 2018	Snapdragon 430	32/64 GB	3/4 GB	13 MP 2 MP (depth)	8 MP		3000 mAh	No
Nova 3i (also known as P Smart+)	July 2018	Kirin 710	64/128 GB	4/6 GB	16 MP 2 MP (depth)	24 MP (wide) 2 MP (depth)	10 W	3340 mAh	No
Nova 3	August 2018	Kirin 970	64/128 GB	4/6 GB	16 MP (wide) 24 MP (B/W, wide)	24 MP (wide) 2 MP (depth)	18 W HUAWEI Quick Charge	3750 mAh	No
Nova 3e (Also known as P20 lite)	March 2018	Kirin 659	64/128 GB	4 GB	16 MP (wide) 2 MP (depth)	24 MP (wide)	18 W HUAWEI Quick Charge	3000 mAh	No
Nova 4	December 2018	Kirin 970	128 GB	6/8 GB	48 MP (wide) 16 MP (ultrawide) 2 MP (depth)	25 MP	18 W HUAWEI Quick Charge	3750 mAh	No
Nova 4e (also known as P30 lite)	March 2019	Kirin 710	128 GB	6/8 GB	24 MP (wide) 8 MP (ultrawide) 2 MP (depth)	32 MP	18 W HUAWEI Quick Charge	3750 mAh	No
Nova 5i (also known as P20 lite 2019)	June 2019	Kirin 710F	128 GB	6/8 GB	24 MP (wide) 8 MP (ultrawide) 2 MP (macro) 2 MP (depth)	24 MP	10 W	4000 mAh	No
Nova 5	June 2019	Kirin 810	128 GB	8 GB	48 MP (wide) 16 MP (ultrawide) 2 MP (macro) 2 MP (depth)	32 MP	40 W HUAWEI Supercharge	3500 mAh	No
Nova 5 Pro	June 2019	Kirin 985	128/256 GB	8 GB	48 MP (wide) 16 MP (ultrawide) 2 MP (macro) 2 MP (depth)	32 MP	40 W HUAWEI Supercharge	3500 mAh	No
Nova 5i Pro	July 2019	Kirin 810	128/256 GB	6/8 GB	48 MP (wide) 8 MP (ultrawide) 2 MP (macro) 2 MP (depth)	32 MP	20 W HUAWEI Quick Charge	4000 mAh	No
Nova 5T	September 2019	Kirin 980		6/8 GB	48 MP (wide) 16 MP (ultrawide) 2 MP (macro) 2 MP (depth)	32 MP	22.5w HUAWEI Supercharge	3750 mAh	No
Nova 5z	November 2019	Kirin 810	64/128 GB	6 GB	48 MP (wide) 8 MP (ultrawide) 2 MP (macro) 2 MP (depth)	32 MP	20 W HUAWEI Quick Charge	4000 mAh	No
Nova 6 SE (also known as P40 lite in Europe)	December 2019	Kirin 810	128 GB	8 GB	48 MP (wide) 8 MP (ultrawide) 2 MP (macro) 2 MP (depth)	16 MP	40w HUAWEI Supercharge	4200 mAh	No
Nova 6	December 2019	Kirin 990	128 GB	8 GB	40 MP (wide) 8 MP (ultrawide) 8 MP (Telephoto)	32 MP (wide) 8 MP (ultrawide)	40w HUAWEI Supercharge	4100 mAh	No
Nova 6 5G	December 2019	Kirin 990 5G	128/256 GB	8 GB	40 MP (wide) 8 MP (ultrawide) 8 MP (Telephoto)	32 MP (wide) 8 MP (ultrawide)	40w HUAWEI Supercharge	4200 mAh	Yes
Nova 7i (also known as P40 lite in Europe)	February 2020	Kirin 810	128 GB	8 GB	48 MP (wide) 8 MP (ultrawide) 2 MP (macro) 2 MP (depth)	16 MP	40w HUAWEI Supercharge	4200 mAh	Yes
Nova 7 SE 5G (also known as P40 lite 5G in Europe)	April 2020	Kirin 820 5G	128/256 GB	6/8 GB	64 MP (wide) 8 MP (ultrawide) 2 MP (macro) 2 MP (depth)	16 MP	40w HUAWEI Supercharge 5w Reverse Charging	4000 mAh	Yes
Nova 7 5G	April 2020	Kirin 985 5G	128/256 GB	8 GB	64 MP (wide) 8 MP (ultrawide) 8 MP (Telephoto) 2 MP (macro)	32 MP	40w HUAWEI Supercharge 5w Reverse Charging	4000 mAh	Yes
Nova 7 Pro 5G	April 2020	Kirin 985 5G	128/256 GB	8 GB	64 MP (wide) 8 MP (ultrawide) 8 MP (Periscope telephoto) 2 MP (macro)	32 MP (wide) 8 MP (ultrawide)	40w HUAWEI Supercharge 5w Reverse Charging	4000 mAh	Yes
Nova 7 SE 5G Youth	October 2020	Dimensity 800U	128 GB	8 GB	64 MP (wide) 8 MP (ultrawide) 2 MP (macro) 2 MP (depth)	16 MP	40w HUAWEI Supercharge	4000 mAh	Yes
Nova 8 SE 5G	November 2020	Dimensity 720 Dimensity 800U	128 GB	8 GB	64 MP (wide) 8 MP (ultrawide) 2 MP (macro) 2 MP (depth)	16 MP	66 W HUAWEI Supercharge	3600 mAh	Yes
Nova 8 5G	January 2021	Kirin 985 5G	128/256 GB	8 GB	64 MP (wide) 8 MP (ultrawide) 2 MP (macro) 2 MP (depth)	32 MP	66 W HUAWEI Supercharge 5 W Reverse Charging	3800 mAh	Yes
Nova 8 Pro 5G	January 2021	Kirin 985 5G	128/256 GB	8 GB	64 MP (wide) 8 MP (ultrawide) 2 MP (macro) 2 MP (depth)	16 MP (wide) 32 MP (ultrawide)	66 W HUAWEI Supercharge 5 W Reverse Charging	4000 mAh	Yes
Nova 8 Pro 4G	June 2021	Kirin 985 4G	128/256 GB	8 GB	64 MP (wide) 8 MP (ultrawide) 2 MP (macro) 2 MP (depth)	16 MP (wide) 32 MP (ultrawide)	66 W HUAWEI Supercharge 5 W Reverse Charging	4000 mAh	No
Nova 8i	July 2021	Snapdragon 662	128 GB	6/8 GB	64 MP (wide) 8 MP (ultrawide) 2 MP (macro) 2 MP (depth)	16 MP	66 W HUAWEI Supercharge	4300 mAh	No
Nova 8	August 2021	Kirin 820E	128/256 GB	8 GB	64 MP (wide) 8 MP (ultrawide) 2 MP (macro) 2 MP (depth)	32 MP	66 W HUAWEI Supercharge 5 W Reverse Charging	3800 mAh	No
Nova 8 SE Youth	August 2021	Kirin 710A	128 GB	8 GB	48 MP (wide) 2 MP (macro) 2 MP (depth)	16 MP	40 W HUAWEI Supercharge	4000 mAh	No
Nova 8 SE 4G	November 2021	Kirin 710A	128 GB	8 GB	64 MP (wide) 8 MP (ultrawide) 2 MP (macro) 2 MP (depth)	16 MP	66 W HUAWEI Supercharge	3600 mAh	No
Nova Y60	September 2021	Helio P35	64 GB	4 GB	13 MP (wide) 5 MP (ultrawide) 2 MP (depth)	8 MP	10 W	5000 mAh	No
Nova Y9a (also known as Y9a)	January 2022	Helio G80	128 GB	8 GB	64 MP (wide) 8 MP (ultrawide) 2 MP (macro) 2 MP (depth)	16 MP	22.5 W HUAWEI Supercharge	4200 mAh	No
Nova Y9a (also known as Y9a)	January 2022	Helio G80	128 GB	8 GB	64 MP (wide) 8 MP (ultrawide) 2 MP (macro) 2 MP (depth)	16 MP	40 W HUAWEI Supercharge	4300 mAh	No
Nova Y70 (also known as Nova Y70 Plus in South East Asia and South Africa)	May 2022	Kirin 710A	64/128 GB	4 GB	48 MP (wide) 5 MP (ultrawide) 2 MP (depth)	8 MP	22.5 W HUAWEI Supercharge	6000 mAh	No
Nova Y90	July 2022	Snapdragon 680 4G	128 GB	4/6/8 GB	50 MP (wide) 2 MP (macro) 2 MP (depth)	8 MP	40 W HUAWEI Supercharge	5000 mAh	No
Nova 9	September 2021	Snapdragon 778 4G	128/256 GB	8 GB	50 MP (wide) 8 MP (ultrawide) 2 MP (macro) 2 MP (depth)	32 MP	66 W HUAWEI Supercharge/ Reverse Charging	4300 mAh	No
Nova 9 Pro	September 2021	Snapdragon 778 4G	128/256 GB	8 GB	50 MP (wide) 8 MP (ultrawide) 2 MP (macro) 2 MP (depth)	32 MP (wide) 32 MP (ultrawide)	100w HUAWEI Supercharge/ Reverse Charging	4000 mAh	No
Nova 9 SE	March 2022	Snapdragon 680 4G	128/256/512 GB	6/8 GB	108 MP (wide) 8 MP (ultrawide) 2 MP (macro) 2 MP (depth)	16 MP	66 W HUAWEI Supercharge/ Reverse Charging	4000 mAh	No
Nova 10	July 2022	Snapdragon 778 4G	128/256 GB	6/8 GB	50 MP (wide) 8 MP (ultrawide) 2 MP (macro)	60 MP (ultrawide)	66 W HUAWEI Supercharge/ Reverse Charging	4000 mAh	No
Nova 10 Pro	July 2022	Snapdragon 778 4G	128/256 GB	8 GB	50 MP (wide) 8 MP (ultrawide) 2 MP (macro)	60 MP (ultrawide) 8 MP (Telephoto)	100w HUAWEI Supercharge/ Reverse Charging	4500 mAh	No
Nova 10z	September 2022	Kirin 710A	128/256 GB	8 GB	64 MP (wide) 8 MP (ultrawide) 2 MP (macro)	16 MP	66 W HUAWEI Supercharge	4000 mAh	No
Nova 10 SE	October 2022	Snapdragon 680 4G	128/256 GB	6/8 GB	108 MP (wide) 8 MP (ultrawide) 2 MP (macro)	16 MP	66 W HUAWEI Supercharge	4500 mAh	No
Nova 10 Youth	March 2023	Snapdragon 680 4G	128/256 GB	8 GB	108 MP (wide) 8 MP (ultrawide) 2 MP (macro) 2 MP (depth)	16 MP	40 W HUAWEI Supercharge	4000 mAh	No
Nova Y61 (also known as Nova Y62/Y62 Plus in South Africa and Enjoy 50z in China)	November 2022		64 GB	4/6 GB	50 MP (wide) 2 MP (macro) 2 MP (depth)	5 MP	22.5 W HUAWEI Supercharge	5000 mAh	No
Nova Y71	May 2023	Kirin 710A	128 GB	8 GB	48 MP (wide) 5 MP (ultrawide) 2 MP (depth)	8 MP	22.5 W HUAWEI Supercharge	6000 mAh	No
Nova Y91	May 2023	Snapdragon 680	128/256 GB	6/8 GB	50 MP (wide) 2 MP (depth)	8 MP	22.5 W HUAWEI Supercharge	7000 mAh	No
Nova 11	April 2023	Snapdragon 778 4G	128/256/512 GB	8 GB	50 MP (wide) 8 MP (ultrawide)	60 MP (ultrawide)	66 W HUAWEI Supercharge/ Reverse Charging	4500 mAh	No
Nova 11 Pro	April 2023	Snapdragon 778 4G	256/512 GB	8 GB	50 MP (wide) 8 MP (ultrawide)	60 MP (ultrawide) 8 MP (Telephoto)	100w HUAWEI Supercharge/ Reverse Charging	4500 mAh	No
Nova 11 Utra	April 2023	Snapdragon 778 4G	512 GB	12 GB	50 MP (wide) 8 MP (ultrawide)	60 MP (ultrawide) 8 MP (Telephoto)	100w HUAWEI Supercharge/ Reverse Charging	4500 mAh	No
Nova 11i	May 2023	Snapdragon 680	128/256 GB	8 GB	108 MP (wide) 2 MP (depth)	16 MP	40 W HUAWEI Supercharge	5000 mAh	No
Nova 11 SE	October 2023	Snapdragon 680	256/512 GB	8 GB	108 MP (wide) 8 MP (ultrawide) 2 MP (macro)	32 MP	66 W HUAWEI Supercharge	4500 mAh	No
Nova 12	December 2023	Kirin 830	256/512 GB	8 GB	50 MP (wide) 8 MP (ultrawide)	60 MP (ultrawide)	66 W HUAWEI Supercharge/ Reverse Charging	4600 mAh	Yes
Nova 12 Pro	December 2023	Kirin 9000S	256/512 GB	8 GB	50 MP (wide) 8 MP (ultrawide)	60 MP (ultrawide) 8 MP (Telephoto)	100 W HUAWEI Supercharge/ Reverse Charging	4600 mAh	Yes
Nova 12 Ultra	December 2023	Kirin 9000S	512 GB 1 TB	12 GB	50 MP (wide) 8 MP (ultrawide)	60 MP (ultrawide) 8 MP (Telephoto)	100 W HUAWEI Supercharge/ Reverse Charging	4600 mAh	Yes
Nova 12s (also known as Nova 12 Lite in China)	March 2024	Snapdragon 778 4G	256/512 GB	8 GB	50 MP (wide) 8 MP (ultrawide)	60 MP (ultrawide)	66 W HUAWEI Supercharge/ Reverse Charging	4500 mAh	No
Nova 12i	March 2024	Snapdragon 680	128/256 GB	8 GB	108 MP (wide) 2 MP (depth)	32 MP	40 W HUAWEI Supercharge	5000 mAh	No
Nova 12 SE	March 2024	Snapdragon 680	256 GB	8 GB	108 MP (wide) 8 MP (ultrawide) 2 MP (macro)	32 MP	66 W HUAWEI Supercharge	4500 mAh	No
Nova Y62 (also known as Nova Y61 and Enjoy 50z in China)	December 2023		128 GB	4 GB	50 MP (wide) 2 MP (macro) 2 MP (depth)	5 MP	22.5 W HUAWEI Supercharge	5000 mAh	No
Nova Y62 Plus (also known as Nova Y61 and Enjoy 50z in China)	December 2023		128 GB	8 GB	50 MP (wide) 2 MP (macro) 2 MP (depth)	5 MP	22.5 W HUAWEI Supercharge	5000 mAh	No
Nova Y72 (also known as Enjoy 70 in China)	January 2024	Kirin 710A	128/256 GB	8 GB	50 MP (wide) 2 MP (depth)	8 MP	22.5 W HUAWEI Supercharge	6000 mAh	No
Nova Y72S (also known as Enjoy 70S in China)	December 2024	Snapdragon 680	128/256 GB	8 GB	50 MP (wide) 2 MP (depth)	8 MP	22.5 W HUAWEI Supercharge	6000 mAh	No
Nova Flip	August 2024		256/512 GB 1 TB	12 GB	50 MP (wide) 8 MP (ultrawide)	32 MP	66 W HUAWEI Supercharge/ 5 W reverse charging	4400 mAh	No
Nova 13	October 2024	Kirin 8000	256/512 GB 1 TB	12 GB	50 MP (wide) 8 MP (ultrawide)	60 MP (ultrawide)	100 W HUAWEI Supercharge/ 5 W reverse charging	5000 mAh	Yes
Nova 13 Pro	October 2024	Kirin 8000	256/512 GB 1 TB	12 GB	50 MP (wide) 8 MP (ultrawide) 12 MP (Telephoto)	60 MP (ultrawide) 8 MP (Telephoto)	100 W HUAWEI Supercharge/ 5 W reverse charging	5000 mAh	Yes
Nova 13i	December 2024	Snapdragon 680	128/256 GB	8 GB	108 MP (wide) 2 MP (depth)	8 MP	40 W HUAWEI Supercharge	5000 mAh	No

=== Ascend GX series ===
List of Ascend GX series phones (discontinued)

- Huawei Ascend GX (2014)
- Huawei Ascend GX-2
- Huawei Ascend GX-3
- Huawei Ascend GX-4
- Huawei Ascend GX-5
- Huawei Ascend GX-6
- Huawei Ascend GX-7
- Huawei Ascend GX-8
- Huawei Ascend GX-9

=== T Series ===
List of T series phones (discontinued)

- Huawei T120
- Huawei T161L
- Huawei T156
- Huawei T158
- Huawei T201
- Huawei T208
- Huawei T211
- Huawei T261L
- Huawei T330
- Huawei T552

=== U Series ===
List of U series phones (discontinued)

- Huawei U1000
- Huawei U1100
- Huawei U1270
- Huawei U3300
- Huawei U7310
- Huawei U7510
- Huawei U8100
- Huawei U8110
- Huawei U9130 Compass
- Huawei U9150

=== Honor series (former sub-brand of Huawei) ===
The appeal of Honor, formerly a sub-brand in Huawei's broader smartphone portfolio aimed at the youth market, is that it packs many of the advanced features of the company's premium line of Huawei-brand phones at significantly lower cost.

- Honor (Huawei U8860) (2011)
- Honor 2 (Huawei U9508) (2012)
- Honor 3 outdoor (2013)
- Honor 3C (2013)
- Honor 3X (2013)
- Honor 3C 4G (2014)
- Honor 3C Play (2014)
- Honor 4X (2014)
- Honor 4C (2015)
- Honor 4A (2015)
- Honor 5X (2015)
- Honor 6 (2014)
- Honor 6 Plus (2014)
- Honor 6X (2016)
- Honor 7 (2015)
- Honor 7A (also called Honor Play 7A in China and Honor 7A Pro) (2018)
- Honor 7i (2015)
- Honor 7X (2017)
- Honor 7C (also called Honor Play 7C in China) (2018)
- Honor 7S (also called Honor Play 7 and Honor 7A) (2018)
- Honor 8 (2016)
- Honor 8 Lite (2017)
- Honor V8 (2016)
- Honor 8 Pro (also called Honor V9 in China) (2017)
- Honor 9 (2017)
- Honor 9 Lite (2017)
- Honor 9i (a.k.a. Honor 9N in India) (2018)
- Honor 9i (for India) (a.k.a. Huawei Mate 10 Lite, Maimang 6, Nova 2i)
- Honor View 10 (2017) (also called Honor V10 in China)
- Honor View 20 (2018) (also called Honor V20 in China)
- Honor View 30 (2019) (also called Honor V30 in China)
- Honor View 30 Pro (2019) (also called Honor V30 Pro in China)
- Honor 10 (2018)
- Honor 10 GT (2018)
- Honor 10 Lite (2018)
- Honor 20 (2019)
- Honor 20 Pro (2019)
- Honor 20 Lite (2019)
- Honor 30 (2020)
- Honor 30 Pro (2020)
- Honor 30 Pro+ (2020)
- Honor 30S (2020)
- Honor 30 Lite (2020)
- Honor 30i (2020)
- Honor Play (2018)
- Honor Play 3 (2019)
- Honor Play 3e (2019)
- Honor Play 4 (2020)
- Honor Play 4 Pro (2020)
- Honor Play 4T (2020)
- Honor Play 4T Pro (2020)
- Honor Note 10 (2018)
- Honor 8X (2018)
- Honor 8X Max (2018)
- Honor 8C (2018)
- Honor Magic (2016)
- Honor Magic 2 (2018)
- Honor 8A (2019) (also called Honor 8A Pro, Honor 8A Prime, Honor 8A 2020)
- Honor 8S (2019) (also called Honor 8S 2020)
- Honor X10 (2020)
- Honor X10 Max (2020)
- Honor 10X Lite (2020)

=== Enjoy series ===
The Huawei Enjoy series is a series of phones sold exclusively in China. The Enjoy series actually encompasses many different phones from other Huawei phone series, primarily the Huawei Y series, however it also has phones from the Honor sub-brand and the P series. The Enjoy series phones are completely identical to the phones they reflect in other series, with the only difference being software (Chinese ROM) and branding.

There is only one phone exclusive to the Enjoy series:

Model	Processor	Internal storage	RAM	Rear Camera	Front Camera	Battery	5G Connectivity
Enjoy 5 (also known as Y6 Pro)	Mediatek MT6735P	16 GB	2 GB	13 MP (wide)	5 MP	4000 mAh	No
Enjoy 5S (also known as GR3)	Mediatek MT6753T	16 GB	2 GB	13 MP (wide)	5 MP	2200 mAh	No
Enjoy 6	Mediatek MT6750	16 GB	3 GB	13 MP	5 MP	4100 mAh	No
Enjoy 6S (also known as Honor 6C, Nova Smart)	Qualcomm Snapdragon 435	16 GB	2 GB	13 MP	5 MP	3020 mAh	No
Enjoy 7 Plus (also known as Y7 Prime)	Qualcomm Snapdragon 435	32/64 GB	3/4 GB	12 MP	8 MP	4000 mAh	No
Enjoy 7	Qualcomm Snapdragon 425	32 GB	3 GB	13 MP	8 MP	3020 mAh	No
Enjoy 7S (also known as P Smart)	Kirin 659	32/64 GB	3/4 GB	13 MP 2 MP (depth)	8 MP	3000 mAh	No
Enjoy 8 Plus (also known as Y9 2018)	Kirin 659	32/64/128 GB	3/4 GB	16 MP (wide) 2 MP (depth)	13 MP (wide) 2 MP (depth)	4000 mAh	No
Enjoy 8 (also known as Y7 Prime 2018 and Nova 2 lite)	Qualcomm Snapdragon 430	32 GB	3 GB	12 MP 2 MP (depth)	8 MP	3000 mAh	No
Enjoy 8e (also known as Honor Play 7A, Honor 7A, and Honor 7C)	Qualcomm Snapdragon 430	32 GB	3 GB	13 MP 2 MP (depth)	8 MP	3000 mAh	No
Enjoy 8e Youth Edition (also known as Y5 Prime 2018)	Mediatek MT6739	32 GB	2 GB	13 MP	5 MP	3020 mAh	No
Enjoy Max (also known as Huawei Y Max and Honor 8X Max)	Qualcomm Snapdragon 660	128 GB	4 GB	16 MP 2 MP (depth)	8 MP	5000 mAh	No
Enjoy 9	Qualcomm Snapdragon 450	32/64 GB	3/4 GB	13 MP 2 MP (depth)	8 MP	4000 mAh	No
Enjoy 9 Plus (also known as Y9 2019)	Kirin 710	128 GB	4/6 GB	13 MP 2 MP (depth)	16 MP 2 MP (depth)	4000 mAh	No
Enjoy 9S (also known as P Smart+ 2019 in Europe)	Kirin 710	64/128 GB	4/6 GB	24 MP 16 MP (ultrawide) 2 MP (depth)	8 MP	3400 mAh	No
Enjoy 9e	Mediatek Helio P35	32/64 GB	3 GB	13 MP	8 MP	3020 mAh	No
Enjoy 10	Kirin 710F	64/128 GB	4/6 GB	48 MP (wide) 2 MP (depth)	8 MP	4000 mAh	No
Enjoy 10 Plus	Kirin 710F	128 GB	4/6/8 GB	48 MP (wide) 8 MP (ultrawide) 2 MP (depth)	16 MP	4000 mAh	No
Enjoy 10S (also known as P Smart S in Europe and Y8p)	Kirin 710F	64 GB	6 GB	48 MP (wide) 8 MP (ultrawide) 2 MP (depth)	16 MP	4000 mAh	No
Enjoy 10e	Mediatek Helio P35	64/128 GB	4 GB	13 MP (wide) 2 MP (depth)	8 MP	5000 mAh	No
Enjoy Z 5G	MediaTek Dimensity 800 5G	64/128 GB	8 GB	48 MP (wide) 8 MP (ultrawide) 2 MP (depth)	16 MP	4000 mAh	Yes
Enjoy 20 5G	MediaTek Dimensity 720 5G	128 GB	4/6 GB	13 MP (wide) 5 MP (ultrawide) 2 MP (macro)	8 MP	5000 mAh	Yes
Enjoy 20 Plus 5G	MediaTek Dimensity 720 5G	128 GB	6/8 GB	48 MP (wide) 8 MP (ultrawide) 2 MP (macro)	16 MP	4200 mAh	Yes
Enjoy 20 Pro 5G	MediaTek Dimensity 800 5G	128 GB	6/8 GB	48 MP (wide) 8 MP (ultrawide) 2 MP (macro)	16 MP	4000 mAh	Yes
Enjoy 20 SE	Kirin 710A	128 GB	4/8 GB	13 MP (wide) 8 MP (ultrawide) 2 MP (macro)	8 MP	5000 mAh	No
Enjoy 20e	Mediatek Helio P35 Kirin 710A	64/128 GB	4/6 GB	13 MP (wide) 2 MP (depth)	8 MP	5000 mAh	No
Enjoy 50	Kirin 710A	128/256 GB	6/8 GB	13 MP (wide) 2 MP (macro)	8 MP	6000 mAh	No
Enjoy 50 Pro (also known as Nova Y90)	Qualcomm Snapdragon 680	128/256 GB	8 GB	50 MP (wide) 2 MP (macro) 2 MP (depth)	8 MP	5000 mAh	No
Enjoy 50z (also known as Nova Y61 and Nova Y62/Y62 Plus in South Africa)		128/256 GB	6/8 GB	50 MP (wide) 2 MP (macro) 2 MP (depth)	5 MP	5000 mAh	No
Enjoy 60	Kirin 710A	128/256 GB	8 GB	48 MP (wide) 2 MP (depth)	8 MP	6000 mAh	No
Enjoy 60X (also known as Nova Y91)	Qualcomm Snapdragon 680	128/256/512 GB	8 GB	50 MP (wide) 2 MP (depth)	8 MP	7000 mAh	No
Enjoy 60 Pro (also known as Nova 11i)	Qualcomm Snapdragon 680	128/256 GB	8 GB	48 MP (wide) 2 MP (depth)	8 MP	5000 mAh	No
Enjoy 70 (also known as Nova Y72)	Kirin 710A	128/256 GB	8 GB	50 MP (wide) 2 MP (depth)	8 MP	6000 mAh	No
Enjoy 70 Pro (also known as Nova 12i)	Qualcomm Snapdragon 680	128/256 GB	8 GB	108 MP (wide) 2 MP (depth)	8 MP	5000 mAh	No
Enjoy 70z	Kirin 710A	128/256 GB	8 GB	13 MP (wide) 2 MP (depth)	8 MP	6000 mAh	No
Enjoy 70X	Kirin 8000A	128/256/512 GB	8 GB	50 MP (wide) 2 MP (depth)	8 MP	6100 mAh	Yes

=== Maimang ===
麦芒 is smartphone brand founded in 2013, by China Telecom, Huawei and Tencent. Maimang is manufactured by Huawei and sold at Huawei physical stores in China.

== PCs ==
=== MateBook series ===
Name	Release date	Processor	RAM	Storage	Screen size	Colours
MateBook Fold ULTIMATE DESIGN (2026)	2026	Huawei Kirin X90 Plus	24 GB/32 GB	512 GB/1 TB/2 TB	18 inches	Black/White/Blue
MateBook Pro S	2026	Huawei Kirin XE90	16 GB/24 GB	512 GB/1 TB	14.2 inches	Black/White
MateBook Pro (2026)	2026	Huawei Kirin X90 Plus	24 GB/32 GB	512 GB/1 TB	14.2 inches	Black/White/Blue
MateBook 14 HarmonyOS Edition	2026	Huawei Kirin X90		1 TB/TB	18 inches	Black/White/Blue
MateBook Fold ULTIMATE DESIGN	2025	Huawei Kirin X90	32 GB	1 TB/2 TB	18 inches	Black/White/Blue
MateBook Pro	2025	Huawei Kirin X90	24 GB/32 GB	512 GB/1 TB/2 TB	14.2 inches	Black/White/Blue
MateBook X Pro 2024	2024	Intel Core Ultra 9	16 GB/32 GB	1 TB/2 TB	14.2 inches/360 mm	Black/White/Morandi Blue
MateBook 14 2024	2024	Intel Core Ultra 5/7	16 GB	512 GB	14.2 inches/360 mm	Green/Space Grey
MateBook D14 2024	2024	Intel H/Intel Core i5	16 GB	512 GB	14 inches/355 mm	Bright Moon Silver/Deep Space Gray
MateBook D 16 2024	2024	Intel Core i9/i7/i5	16 GB	512 GB/1 TB	16 inches/355 mm	Space Gray
MateBook 14 2023	2023	Intel Core i7	16 GB	512 GB/1 TB	14 inches/355 mm	Space Gray
MateBook X Pro 2023	2023	Intel Core i7	16 GB	1 TB	14.2 inches/360 mm	Dragonfly-like Ink Blue/White/Space Gray
MateBook D 16 2023	April 2023	Intel Core i9/i5/i7	16 GB	512 GB/1 TB	16 inches/355 mm	Space Gray
MateBook 16s (2023)	2023	Intel Core i9	16 GB	1 TB	16 inches/406 mm	Space Gray
MateBook 14 2022	2022	Intel Core i7	16 GB	512 GB	14 inches/355 mm	Space Gray
MateBook X Pro 2022	2022	Intel Core i7	16 GB	1 TB	14 inches/355 mm	Dragonfly-like Ink Blue/White/Space Gray
MateBook E 2022	2022	Intel Core i5	8 GB/16 GB	128 GB/256 GB/512 GB	12.6 inches/355 mm	Nebula Grey
MateBook D 16 2022	2022	Intel Core i7/i5	16 GB	512 GB/256 GB	16 inches/355 mm	Space Gray
MateBook 16	2022	AMD Ryzen 7	16 GB	512 GB	16 inches/406 mm	Space Gray
MateBook 14 2021	2022	AMD Ryzen 5	16 GB	512 GB	14 inches/355 mm	Space Gray
MateBook D15 (2021)	2021	AMD Ryzen 5	8 GB	512 GB	15.6 inches/396 mm	Space Grey
MateBook 14s 2021	2021	Intel Core i7	16 GB	512 GB/1 TB	14.2 inches/360 mm	Spruce Green
MateBook X Pro 2021	2021	Intel Core i5 11th Gen/ Intel Core i7 11th Gen	16 GB	512 GB/1 TB	13.9 inches/353 mm	Space Gray
MateBook X Pro 2020	24 February 2020	Intel Core i5 10th Gen/ Intel Core i7 10th Gen	16 GB	512 GB/1 TB	13.9 inches/353 mm	Space Gray
MateBook 13 2020	7 February 2020	Intel Core i5 10th Gen/ Intel Core i7 10th Gen/ AMD Ryzen 5	8 GB/16 GB	256 GB/512 GB	13 inches/330 mm	Space Gray
MateBook D 14	26 November 2019	AMD Ryzen 5	8 GB	512 GB	14 inches/355 mm	Space Gray
MateBook D 15	26 November 2019	AMD Ryzen 5	8 GB	256 GB	15.6 inches/396 mm	Space Gray
MateBook X Pro 2019	24 February 2019	Intel Core i5 8th Gen/ Intel Core i7 8h Gen	8 GB	512 GB	13.9 inches/353 mm	Space Gray
MateBook 13 2019	24 February 2019	Intel Core i5 8th Gen	8 GB	512 GB	13 inches/330 mm	Mystic Silver/Space Grey
MateBook D	August 2018	AMD Ryzen 5	8 GB	256 GB	14 inches/355 mm	Space Gray
MateBook X Pro 2018	March 2018	Intel Core i7	16 GB	256 GB	13 inches/330 mm	Space Gray
MateBook X Pro 2018	March 2018	Intel Core i7	16 GB	256 GB	13 inches/330 mm	Space Gray
MateBook D 15	2018	Intel Core i5	16 GB	500 GB/1 TB	15 inches/381 mm	Gold
MateBook D	June 2017	Intel i7	8 GB	128 GB/1 TB	15 inches/381 mm	Space Gray
MateBook X	2017	Intel i5	8 GB	128 GB/1 TB	13 inches/330 mm	Space Gray
MateBook E	2017	Intel i5	4 GB/8 GB	128 GB(entry)/256 GB	12 inches/304 mm	White
MateBook	February 21, 2016	Intel Core M	8 GB	512 GB	12 inches/304 mm	White

=== MateStation ===
Name	Release date	Processor	RAM	Storage	Screen size	Colours
MateStation X 2023	November 2, 2023	Intel Core i9-12900H Processor	16GB	512GB	28.2 inch/614.16 mm	Space Gray
MateStation X 2022	November 2, 2022	AMD Ryzen 7 5800H Processor	16GB	512GB	28.2 inch/614.16 mm	Space Gray
MateStation S	April 2022	Intel 10th Gen i5 processor/ i7	8GB/16GB	1TB/256GB	-	Space Gray
MateStation X	September 23, 2021	AMD Ryzen 5 5600H Processor	16GB	512GB	28.2 inch/614.16 mm	Space Gray
MateStation S	September 13, 2021	AMD Ryzen 5 4600G processor	8GB	256GB	-	Space Gray

== Tablets ==
=== MatePad Edge series ===
- Huawei MatePad Edge (2026)

=== MatePad Pro series ===
- Huawei MatePad Pro (2019)
- Huawei MatePad Pro 2021 (2021)
- Huawei MatePad Pro 11 (2022)
- Huawei MatePad Pro 13.2 (2023)
- Huawei MatePad Pro Max 13.2 (2026)
- Huawei MatePad Pro 12 (2026)

=== MatePad Air series ===
- Huawei MatePad Air (2023)

=== MatePad series ===
- Huawei MatePad (2020)
- Huawei MatePad 11 (2021)
- Huawei MatePad 2022 (2022)
- Huawei MatePad 11 2023 (2023)
- Huawei MatePad 11.5 (2023)
- Huawei MatePad 11.5 S (2024)

=== MatePad SE series ===
- Huawei MatePad SE (2022)

== Wearables ==
=== Watch Ultimate Series ===
- Watch Ultimate Design (2023)

=== Watch Series ===
- Watch 5 (2025)

=== Watch GT Series ===
- Watch GT 4 (2023)

=== Watch Fit Series ===
- Watch Fit (2020)
- Watch Fit 2 (2022)
- Watch Fit 4 (2025)
- Watch Fit 4 Pro (2025)

== See also ==
- Motorola Moto#Smartphones
- Samsung Galaxy#Phones
- List of Xiaomi products
- List of Apple products
- List of LG mobile phones
