= Huawei Ascend (phone) =

First phone in the Huawei Ascend series

- Manufacturer: Huawei
- Type: Slate smartphone
- Released: October 27, 2010 (Cricket), December 13, 2010 (MetroPCS)
- Introductory price: US$ 149
- Operating system: Android 2.1 "Eclair" (user-upgradable to Android 2.2 "Froyo", further upgradable via root)
- CPU: 528 MHz
- Memory: Flash memory: 512 MB RAM: 256
- Storage: 2 GB included microSD card. Up to 16 GB microSD card storage.
- Display: 3.5 in HVGA capacitive touchscreen display
- Camera: 3.2-megapixel camera
- Connectivity: EV-DO Rev.A
- Dimensions: 4.5×2.4×0.55 in
- Weight: 4.7 oz (133 g)
- Successor: Huawei Ascend G300

Huawei Ascend is the first phone in the Huawei Ascend series. It ran Android OS 2.1 by default. It has been released in the United States for Cricket Wireless and MetroPCS unsubsidized. As of the summer of 2012, the model is also available on the market in Europe.

The device features a 3.5-inch HVGA capacitive touch screen, 2.5 mm headphone jack, 3.2-megapixel camera, as well as an accelerometer and a compass. The HVGA capacitive touch screen is not multitouch capable.

First model is Huawei Ascend M860.

== See also ==
- MyTouch
- Huawei Ascend G300
- Huawei Ascend P1
- Huawei Ascend P2
- Huawei Ascend P6
- Huawei Ascend P7 (starting with the successor, Huawei P8, the "Ascend" label was dropped).
