= Huawei Ascend =

Huawei Ascend may refer to:

- Huawei Ascend (chip), a line of systems on a chip (SoCs) for artificial intelligence, released since 2018
- Huawei Ascend (phone series), a series of smartphones released between 2010 and 2015
  - Huawei Ascend (phone), the first in the series, released in 2010
