= G600 =

G600 may refer to:

- Gulfstream G600, a twin-engine business jet
- Huawei Ascend G600, an Android smartphone
- Samsung G600, a mobile phone
