= Huawei Ascend G312 =

Budget smartphone

- First released: Q3 2012
- Availability by region: Q4 2012
- Discontinued: Yes
- Predecessor: Huawei Ascend G300
- Successor: Huawei Ascend G330
- Color: Black
- Dimensions: 122.5 x 62.5 x 10.5 mm (4.82 x 2.46 x 0.41 in)
- Weight: 4.94 oz (140 g)
- Operating system: Android 4.0 (Ice Cream Sandwich)
- CPU: 1.4 GHz
- Memory: 1GB RAM
- Storage: 4GB (2GB user available)
- Removable storage: microSDHC (dedicated slot)
- SIM: Mini-SIM
- Battery: Li-Ion 1500 mAh, removable
- Rear camera: 5 MP, AF with LED flash
- Front camera: VGA
- Display: TFT, 256K colors, 4.0 inches, 45.5 cm² (~59.5% screen-to-body ratio), 480 x 800 pixels, 5:3 ratio (~233 ppi density)

The Huawei Ascend G312 was a mid-range budget smartphone released by Huawei in Q4 2012 (October–December 2012) and was announced in Q3 2012 (July–September 2012). It was part of Huawei's "Ascend G" series, which aimed to offer a balance of functionality, design, and affordability.

Some variations or prototypes were also noted to potentially feature a "QWERTY" keypad that slid out from beneath the display, a feature often associated with T-Mobile's MyTouch series, where it was speculated to be termed "MyTouch Buddy". However, the most widely documented version, does not mention a physical keyboard.
