= Huawei Ascend G6 =

2014 Android smartphone by Huawei

Huawei Ascend G6 Huawei Ascend G6 4G Huawei Ascend P7 mini
- Brand: Huawei
- Manufacturer: Huawei
- Type: Smartphone
- Series: Ascend G/P
- First released: Ascend G6 & G6 4G: February 2014; 12 years ago Ascend P7 mini: April 28, 2014; 12 years ago
- Successor: Huawei Ascend G7; Huawei P8 lite
- Related: Huawei Ascend P6; Huawei Ascend P7
- Compatible networks: GSM, 3G, 4G (LTE) (except Ascend G6)
- Form factor: Monoblock
- Colors: Black, White, Blue, Gold, Pink
- Dimensions: 131.2×65.3×7.8 mm (5.17×2.57×0.31 in)
- Weight: 115 g (4 oz)
- Operating system: Initial: Android 4.3 Jelly Bean + Emotion UI 2 Lite
- CPU: Ascend G6: Qualcomm MSM8X12 Snapdragon 200 (28 nm), 2×1.2 GHz ARM Cortex-A7; Ascend G6 4G & P7 mini: Qualcomm MSM8926 Snapdragon 400 (28 nm), 4×1.2 GHz ARM Cortex-A7
- GPU: Adreno 305
- Memory: 1 GB LPDDR3
- Storage: Ascend G6: 4 GB; Ascend G6 4G & P7 mini: 8 GB eMMC 4.5
- Removable storage: microSDXC up to 64 GB
- Battery: Non-removable Li-Po 2000 mAh
- Rear camera: 8 MP Sony IMX134, f/2.0, 1/4.0", 1.12 μm, AF; LED flash Video: 720p@30fps
- Front camera: 5 MP; Video: 720p@30fps
- Display: All models: LCD, 4.5", 960 × 540, 16:9, 245 ppi Ascend G6 & G6 4G: IPS; Ascend P7 mini: TFT
- Connectivity: microUSB 2.0, 3.5 mm audio jack, Bluetooth 4.0 (A2DP, EDR), NFC, FM radio, Wi-Fi 802.11 b/g/n (DLNA, hotspot), GPS, A-GPS, GLONASS
- Other: Proximity sensor, ambient light sensor, accelerometer, compass

The Huawei Ascend G6 and Huawei Ascend G6 4G are mid-range smartphones developed and manufactured by Huawei, which are simplified versions of Huawei Ascend P6. They were introduced in February 2014 at MWC 2014. The Ascend G6 4G differs in the presence of a more powerful processor, more memory and 4G support.

On April 28, the Huawei Ascend P7 mini was introduced, which differs from the Ascend G6 4G in the type of display. It was a low-end version of the Huawei Ascend P7.

== Specifications ==
=== Design ===
The screen is made of glass. The back panel and bottom are made of plastic and the top and sides are made of plastic stylized as metal.

The G6 and G6 4G features its IPS LCD, while the P7 mini has a TFT LCD sizing at 4.5", with a resolution 960 × 540 (16:9) and a pixel density of 245 ppi.

The color options differ from the models:

- The Ascend G6 was sold in 5 colors: Black, White, Blue, Gold, and Pink.
- The 4G model and P7 mini was sold in Black and White colors. Only the 4G model has color sides.

=== Hardware ===
The Ascend G6 is powered by a Qualcomm Snapdragon 200 processor, while the Ascend G6 4G and P7 mini are powered by a Snapdragon 400. Both processors are equipped with an Adreno 305 GPU.

Both phones have a battery capacity of 2000 mAh and is non-removable.

Both smartphones received an 8 MP, f/2.0 main camera with autofocus and the front camera received a 5 MP resolution. Both the main and front has the ability to record a video at 720p @ 30fps.

Storage and memory configurations differ from the model:

- The Ascend G6 was sold in 1/4 GB configurations.
- The Ascend G6 4G and P7 mini were sold in 1/8 GB configurations.

Slots for a SIM card and a microSD memory card up to 64 GB are accessible after removing the back panel.

=== Software ===
The smartphones were released on Emotion UI 2.0 Lite based on Android 4.3 Jelly Bean.

== Critics ==
A reviewer from the ITC.ua information portal noted the disadvantages of the Ascend G6 like battery life, main camera quality, and the placement of the 3.5 mm and microUSB ports. The reviewer cited the design as a decent platform, and a high-quality front camera as advantages.

According to a reviewer in Pingvin.Pro, advantages of the smartphone are package, design and style, utilization of the power and volume buttons, display, and the Emotion UI 2.0 Lite interface noted. As disadvantages, the engineering of the mini-jack, lag in automatic brightness adjustment, sound, camera with slow autofocus, small amount of RAM, and poor battery life was noticed.
