= Huawei Ascend Y300 =

Smartphone

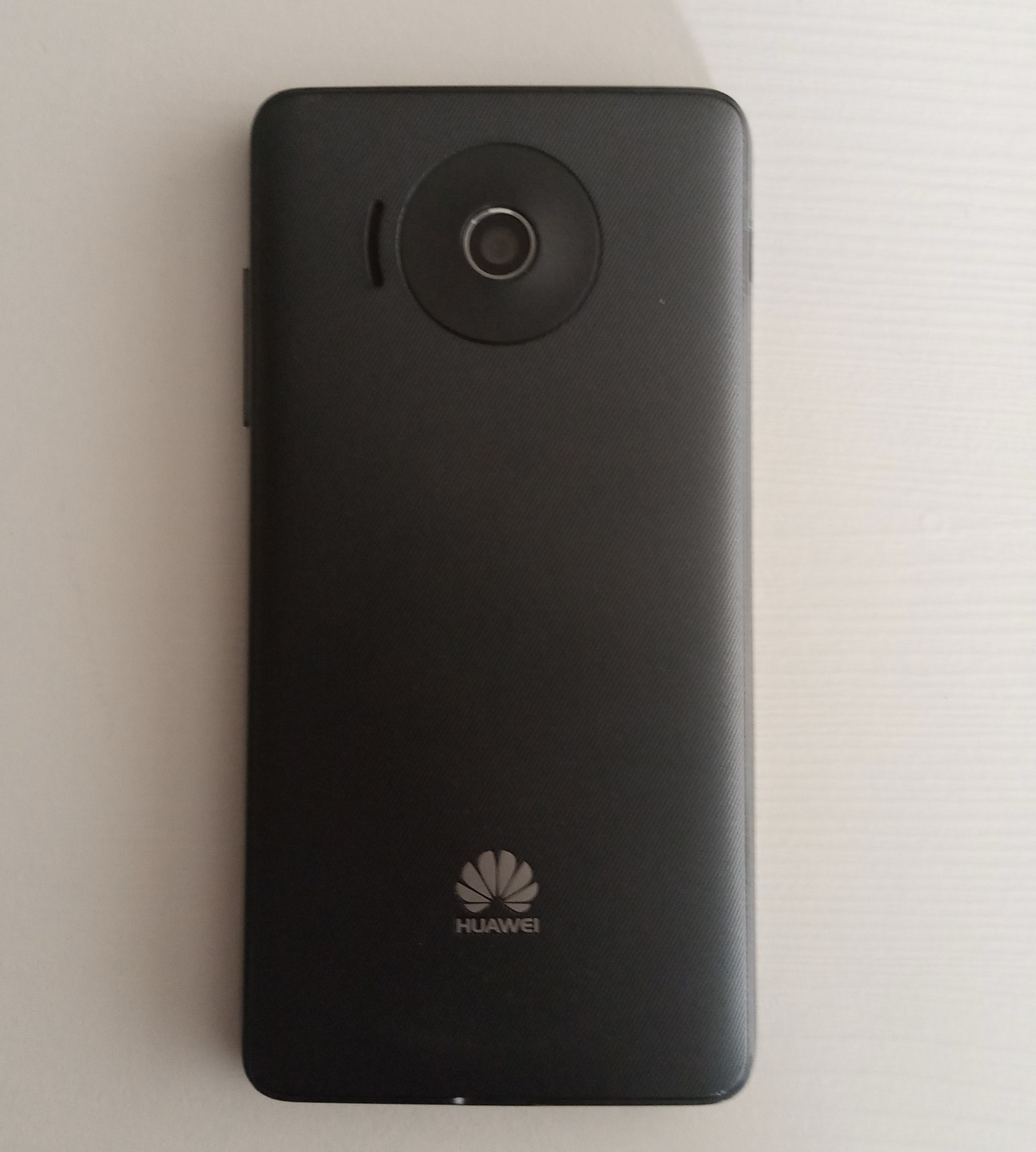
- Brand: Huawei
- Manufacturer: Huawei Technologies Co. Ltd.
- Type: Touchscreen smartphone
- Series: Huawei Ascend
- First released: March 2013
- Predecessor: Huawei Ascend Y210D
- Successor: Huawei Ascend Y321
- Related: Huawei Ascend G510
- Compatible networks: 2G - GSM 850, 900, 1800, 1900 3G Network - HSDPA 900, 2100 (Y300-0100 model) HSDPA 850, 1900, 2100 (Y300-0151 model)
- Form factor: Slate
- Dimensions: 124.5 mm (4.90 in) H 63.8 mm (2.51 in) W 11.2 mm (0.44 in) D
- Weight: 130 g (4.6 oz)
- Operating system: Android 4.1.1 "Jelly Bean"
- System-on-chip: Qualcomm MSM8225 Snapdragon
- CPU: 1 GHz Dual-core Cortex-A5
- GPU: Adreno 203
- Memory: 512 MB
- Storage: 4 GB (2 GB used by the system
- Removable storage: Up to 32 GB microSD
- Battery: 1730 mAh Li-ion; User replaceable
- Rear camera: 5 megapixels
- Front camera: 0.3 megapixels (VGA)
- Display: 4 in (100 mm) 480x800 px (233 ppi)
- Sound: Loudspeaker & 3.5mm headphone connector
- Connectivity: GPRS, EDGE, Wi-Fi (802.11 b/g/n), Wi-Fi hotspot, DLNA, Bluetooth (v2.1, A2DP, EDR), USB (microUSB v2.0)
- Data inputs: Accelerometer, Proximity sensor, light sensor, GPS
- Model: Y300-0100 Y300-0151
- Development status: Discontinued
- Website: www.huawei.com, www.huaweidevice.com,

Huawei Ascend Y300 is a smartphone that was designed and marketed by Huawei Technologies Co. Ltd. Huawei uses Android & Firefox OS for the smartphone It initially ran the Android 4.1.1 (Jelly Bean) operating system. It has a 1 GHz Dual Core Cortex-A5 proArenar with 4GB internal storage with 1.09GB available for the user and 512MB (Shared with GPU 119MB) of RAM memory. The phone also has a 4.0 inch 480 x 800 pixels, (~233 ppi pixel density) LCD and a 5.0MP auto focus rear camera 2592 х 1944 pixels with LED Flash and 0.3(VGA) front camera.
