= Huawei STREAM X GL07S =

Mobile phone model

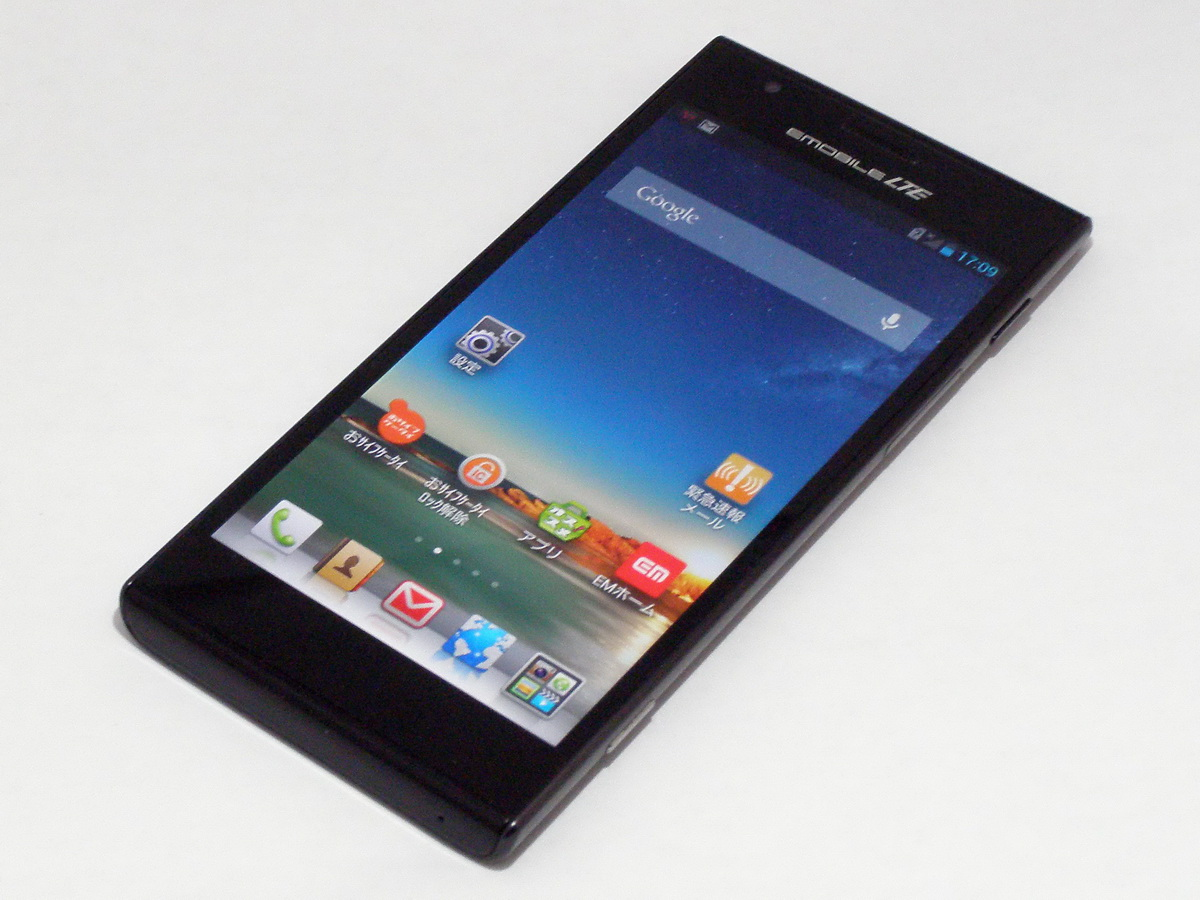
- Manufacturer: Huawei
- Type: Smartphone
- First released: Huawei Ascend P2
- Availability by region: February 2013; 13 years ago
- Form factor: bar
- Dimensions: 137 mm (5.4 in) H 67 mm (2.6 in) W 8.6 mm (0.34 in) D
- Weight: 0.122 kg (0.27 lb)
- Operating system: Android 4.1 "Jelly Bean"
- CPU: HiSilicon K3V2 1.5 GHz quadcore
- Memory: 1 GB (RAM)
- Storage: 32 GB
- Battery: 2350 mAh
- Rear camera: EXMOR RS for mobile
- Display: 4.7 in (120 mm)
- Connectivity: LTE 1800MHz, HSPA/W-CDMA 1700/2100MHz, GSM 900/1800/1900MHz, Bluetooth 4.0, Micro-USB, audio jack, Wi-Fi 802.11b/g/n
- Data inputs: accelerometer, proximity, magnetometer

The Huawei STREAM X GL07S is an Android smartphone manufactured by Huawei.

It is the first LTE phone distributed by Japanese carrier EMOBILE.

== Features ==
The GL07S features a 4.7-inch capacitive touchscreen, a quad-core CPU and a 16-core GPU.

Physical buttons are the power button, a volume control on the side of the phone. There are three touch buttons for Back, Home, Menu.

It is a forerunner to the Huawei Ascend P2, which Huawei claims will be "the world’s fastest smartphone".

It ships with Android 4.1 and Huawei's Emotion UI.
