= Huawei Ascend G7 =

2014 smartphone model

- Manufacturer: Huawei
- Type: Phablet
- Series: Ascend G
- First released: September 4, 2014; 12 years ago
- Predecessor: Huawei Ascend G6
- Successor: Huawei G8
- Compatible networks: GSM, 3G, 4G (LTE)
- Form factor: Slate
- Colors: Horizon Gold, Moonlight Silver, and Space Grey
- Dimensions: 153.5 mm (6.04 in) H 77.3 mm (3.04 in) W 7.6 mm (0.30 in) D
- Weight: 165 g (5.8 oz)
- Operating system: Original: Android 4.4.2 KitKat with EMUI 3 Upgradable: Android 6.0 Marshmallow with EMUI 4
- System-on-chip: Qualcomm MSM8916 Snapdragon 410 (28 nm)
- CPU: Quad-core 1.2 GHz Cortex-A53
- GPU: Adreno 306
- Memory: 2 GB
- Storage: 16 GB eMMC 4.5
- Removable storage: microSDHC up to 32 GB
- SIM: Micro-SIM
- Battery: Non-removable Li-Ion 3000 mAh
- Rear camera: 13 MP, f/2.0, AF; LED flash, HDR, panorama Video: 1080p@30fps
- Front camera: 5 MP; Video: 720p@30fps
- Display: 5.5 in (140 mm) IPS LCD, 1280 × 720 pixels (HD), 16:9 ratio, 267 ppi
- Model: G7-L01, G7-L03, G7-L11, G7-TL00, G7-UL20

The Huawei Ascend G7 is a mid-range smartphone developed by Huawei. It was unveiled on September 4, 2014, at IFA 2014 alongside the Huawei Ascend Mate 7. It is Huawei's first smartphone built on a 64-bit architecture.

The smartphone will be released in Spain, Denmark, Germany, Italy, Hungary, Netherlands Turkey, Poland, Norway, South Africa and Mexico this month, with other regions to be released after the initial launch. In the United Kingdom, the smartphone was announced in February 2015 and launch in March.

== Design ==
The front panel is made of Corning Gorilla Glass 3, while the body is constructed from aluminum with plastic inserts at the top and bottom.

The bottom edge features a microUSB 2.0 port and a microphone. The top edge houses a 3.5 mm audio jack, while the right side contains the volume rocker, power button, and card slots for a SIM card and a microSD card up to 32 GB. The rear features the main camera, a secondary microphone, an LED flash, and a multimedia speaker.

The Huawei Ascend G7 was available in three colors: Horizon Gold, Moonlight Silver, and Space Grey.

== Specifications ==
=== Hardware ===
The Huawei Ascend G7 is powered by a Qualcomm Snapdragon 410 system on a chip. The smartphone has 2 GB of RAM and 16 GB of internal storage. The device features a non-removable 3000 mAh battery.

The Huawei Ascend G7 features a 5.5-inch IPS LCD display with an HD resolution of 1280 × 720 pixels, a pixel density of 267 ppi, and a 16:9 aspect ratio. The smartphone features a 13 MP rear camera with an aperture of f/2.0, autofocus, and support for video recording up to 1080p at 30 fps. The front-facing camera has a 5 MP sensor capable of recording video up to 720p at 30 fps.

=== Software ===
The Huawei Ascend G7 was released with EMUI 3 based on Android 4.4.2 KitKat and was later updated to EMUI 4 based on Android 6.0 Marshmallow.

== Reception ==
Reviews noted the aluminum design, display quality, battery life, camera, and user interface as positive aspects of the Huawei Ascend G7, while criticizing its single SIM slot, 720p display, average performance, and higher price point.
