= Huawei Ascend Mate 2 =

Android smartphone

Huawei Ascend Mate 2 4G
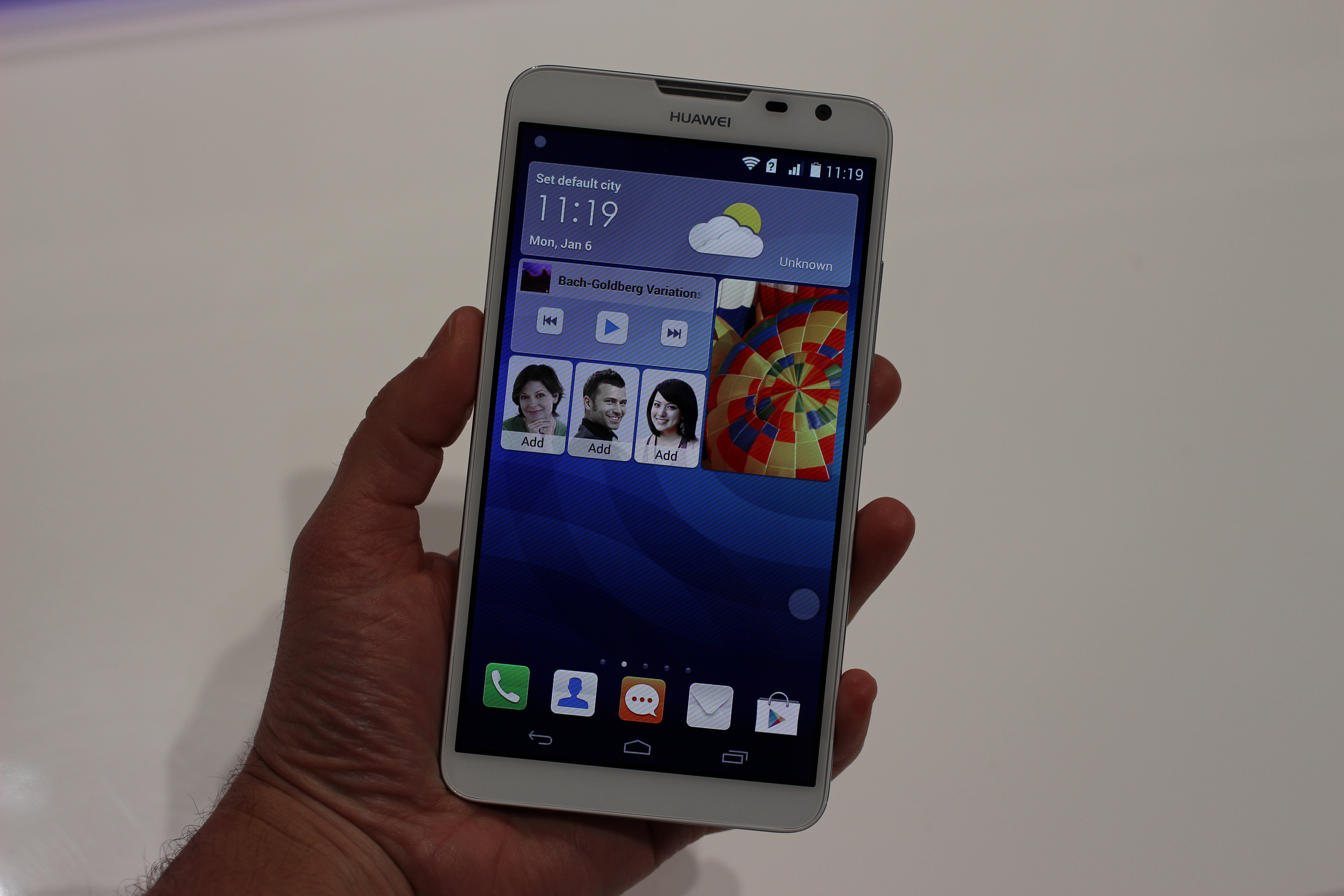
- Manufacturer: Huawei
- Type: Smartphone
- Series: Huawei Ascend (phone series)
- Predecessor: Huawei Ascend Mate
- Successor: Huawei Ascend Mate 7
- Compatible networks: UMTS 850/900/1700/1900/2100 MHz; GSM 850/900/1800/1900 MHz
- Form factor: Bar
- Operating system: Android 4.2 "Jelly Bean"
- Rear camera: 13.0-megapixel AF with HDR
- Front camera: 5.0-megapixel
- Display: 6.1-inch, 1280×720 pixels
- Website: Huawei website, Official US Huawei Store

Huawei Ascend Mate 2 4G is an Android smartphone manufactured by Huawei as part of the Huawei Mate series. A successor to the original Huawei Ascend Mate phablet unveiled in 2013, it has a revised design with a thinner build than its predecessor, adds support for LTE, and the ability to charge other USB devices with its own battery.

Unveiled at Consumer Electronics Show 2014, the device was expected to be released in China within the first quarter of 2014. Huawei also confirmed that with its support for LTE band 4, it released the Ascend Mate 2 in the United States, naming AT&T as a possible partner.

== Specifications ==
The Huawei Ascend Mate 2 has a large, 4,050 mAh battery, allowing it to charge other devices through its USB port. It also includes a 6.1-inch 720p IPS LCD, 1.6 GHz quad-core Qualcomm Snapdragon 400 processor, and 2 GB RAM. The device has a 13 MP rear-facing camera and a 5 MP front-facing camera.
