= Huawei Ascend W1 =

Windows Phone 8 smartphone model

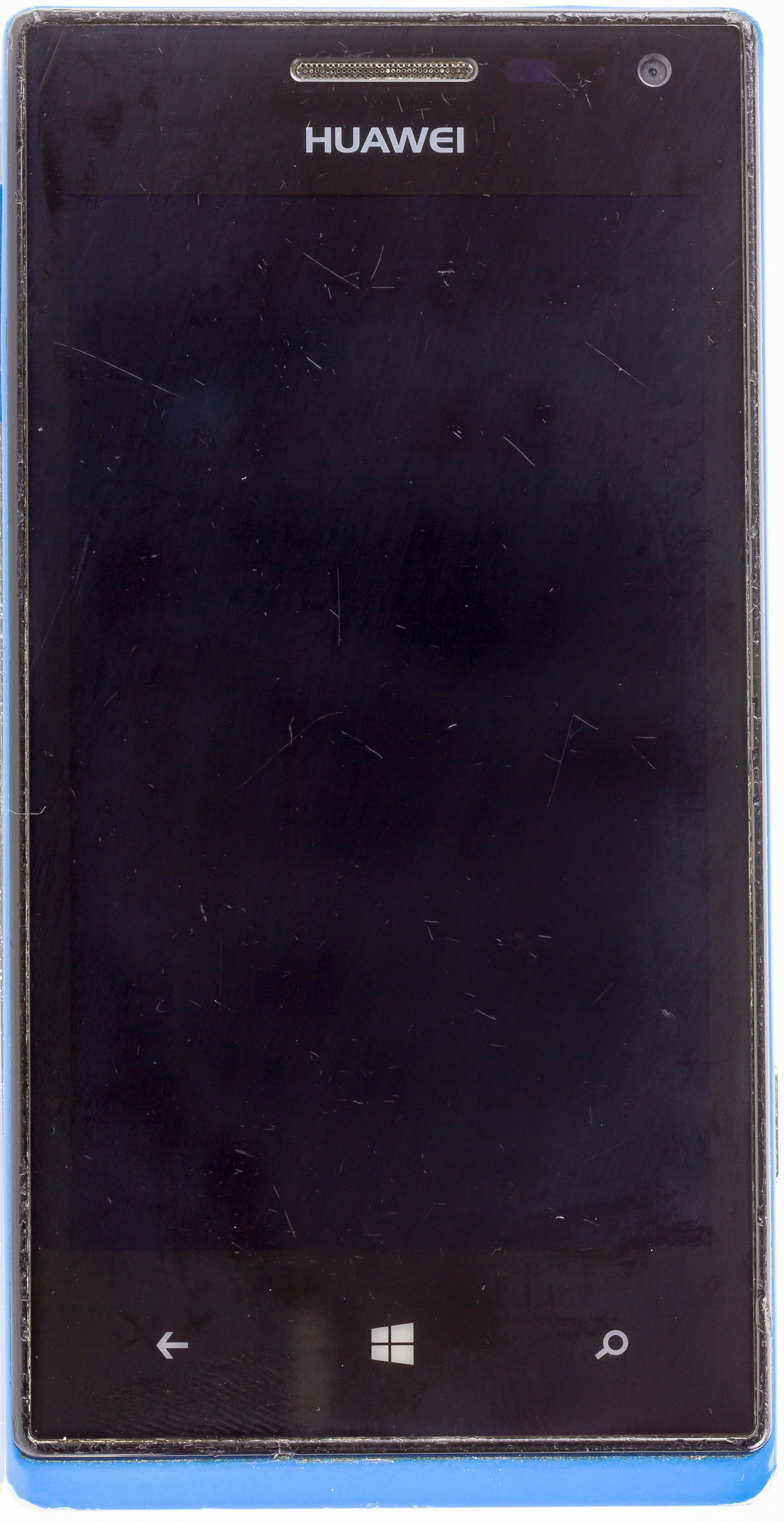
- Manufacturer: Huawei
- Type: Smartphone
- Series: Huawei Ascend
- First released: 2013, Q1
- Availability by region: Q1 2013
- Successor: Huawei Ascend W2
- Compatible networks: GSM/GPRS/EDGE 850/900/1800/1900; HSPA 850/900/1700/1900/2100; Wi-Fi
- Form factor: Slate
- Operating system: Windows Phone 8
- System-on-chip: Qualcomm Snapdragon S4
- CPU: 1.2 GHz dual-core Qualcomm Krait (MSM8230)
- GPU: Qualcomm Adreno 305
- Memory: 4 GB internal flash 512 MB RAM
- Removable storage: MicroSD (up to 32GB)
- Battery: Standard battery, Li-Ion 1950 mAh
- Rear camera: 5.0 Megapixel, 2592х1944pixels, LED flash, autofocus 720p video
- Front camera: VGA
- Display: 4.0" inches 800x480 px 16m-color
- Connectivity: Bluetooth 2.1
- Data inputs: Multi-touch capacitive touchscreen, proximity sensor
- Website: consumer.huawei.com/en/mobile-phones/features/w1-en.htm

The Huawei Ascend W1 is Huawei's first device to run Windows Phone 8. It was announced at the 2013 Consumer Electronics Show (CES). It was released in January 2013 as the least expensive Windows Phone in the Chinese market.

Because of the limited memory available on this phone, certain applications and features will not be able to run.

For African markets, the phone is named as "Huawei 4Afrika" as part of Microsoft's 4Afrika Initiative.
