= Huawei Ascend W2 =

Smartphone

- Manufacturer: Huawei
- Type: Smartphone
- Series: Huawei Ascend (phone series)
- First released: 2013, Q3
- Availability by region: Q3 2013
- Predecessor: Huawei Ascend W1
- Compatible networks: GSM/GPRS/EDGE 850/900/1800/1900; HSPA 850/900/1700/1900/2100; Wi-Fi
- Form factor: Slate
- Dimensions: 134 x 67 x 9.9 mm (5.28 x 2.64 x 0.39 in
- Weight: 160 g (5.64 oz)
- Operating system: Windows Phone 8
- System-on-chip: Qualcomm Snapdragon S4
- CPU: Dual-core 1.4 GHz Krait
- GPU: Qualcomm Adreno 305
- Memory: 8 GB internal flash 512 MB RAM
- Removable storage: MicroSD (up to 32GB)
- Battery: Standard battery, Li-Ion 1950 mAh
- Rear camera: 5.0 Megapixel, 2592х1944pixels, LED flash, autofocus 720p video
- Front camera: VGA
- Display: 4.3" inches 800x480 px 16m-color
- Connectivity: Bluetooth 2.1
- Data inputs: Multi-touch capacitive touchscreen, proximity sensor
- Website: www.huaweidevice.com

Huawei Ascend W2 is the second smartphone in the Huawei Ascend line of devices to run the Windows 8 operating system.

It was announced in November 2013 and released the following month.
