= Huawei Mate 10 =

Android-based smartphone line by Huawei

Huawei Mate 10/Pro/Lite
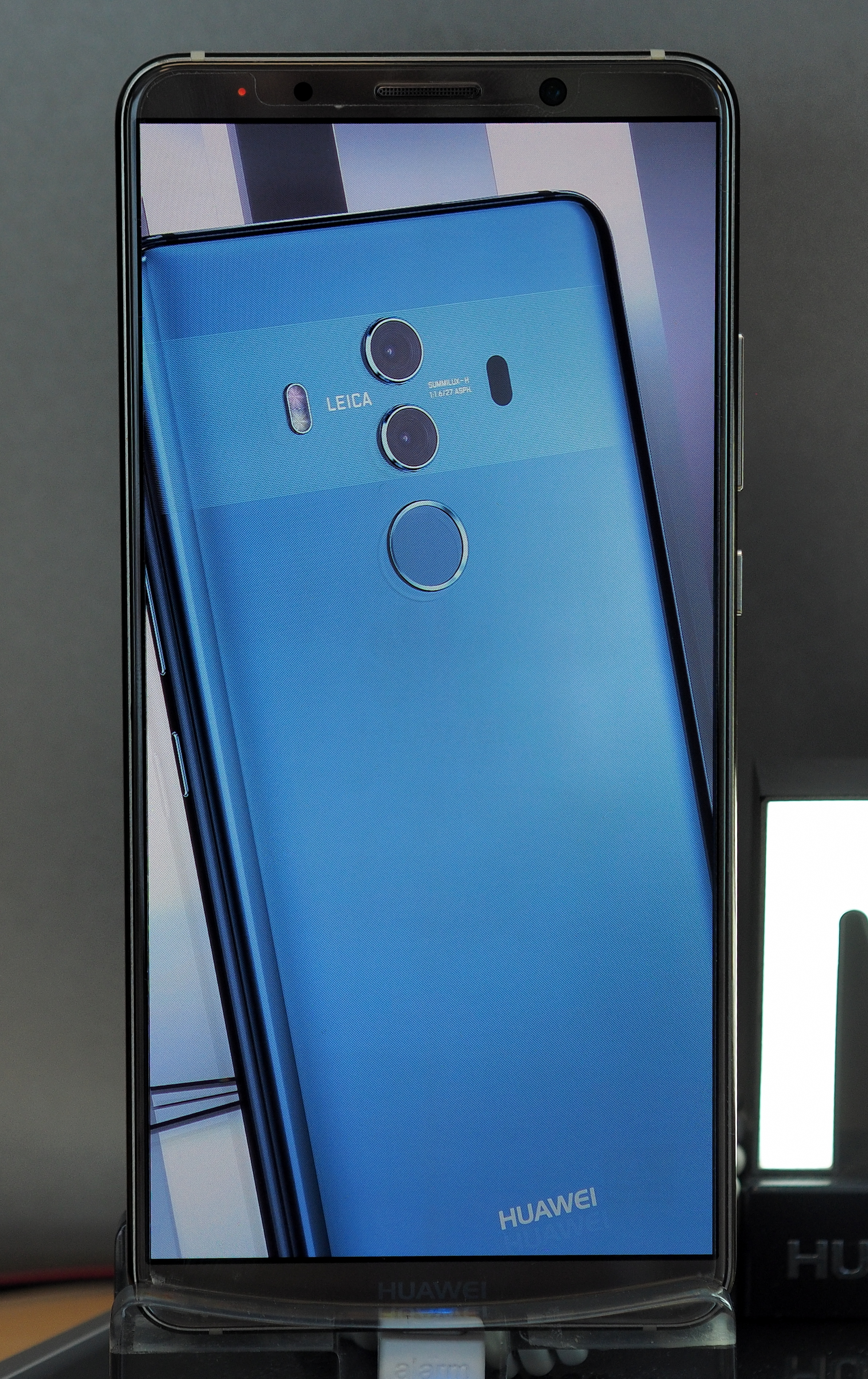
- Manufacturer: Huawei
- Type: Smartphone
- Series: Huawei Mate
- First released: 16 October 2017; 9 years ago
- Predecessor: Huawei Mate 9
- Successor: Huawei Mate 20
- Compatible networks: All Models: 2G GSM/EDGE – 850/900/1800/1900MHz; 3G TD-SCDMA – Band 34/39; 3G UMTS(WCDMA)/HSPA+/DC-HSDPA – Band 1/2/4/5/6/8/19; 4G TD-LTE – Band 34/38/39/40; 4G FDD-LTE – Band 1/2/3/4/5/6/7/8/9/12/17/18/19/20/26/28/32; Single or Dual SIM (Dual 4G & Dual VoLTE)
- Form factor: Phablet
- Dimensions: Mate 10: 150.5 mm (5.93 in) H; 77.8 mm (3.06 in) W; 8.2 mm (0.32 in) D; Mate 10 Pro/PD: 154.2 mm (6.07 in) H; 74.5 mm (2.93 in) W; 7.9 mm (0.31 in) D
- Weight: Mate 10: 186 g (6.6 oz); Mate 10 Pro/PD: 178 g (6.3 oz)
- Operating system: Android 10.0 Q with EMUI; Current: China: HarmonyOS 3
- System-on-chip: HiSilicon Kirin 970
- CPU: Octa-Core CPU (4*Cortex A73 2.36GHz + 4*Cortex A53 1.8GHz) + i7 co-processor + NPU (Neural Network Processing Unit)
- GPU: Mali-G72 MP12 850MHz
- Memory: Mate 10 & 10 Pro: 4/6 GB RAM LPDDR4X 1833MHz; Mate 10 Porsche Design: 6GB RAM LPDDR4X 1833MHz
- Storage: Mate 10: 64 GB UFS 2.1 Mate 10 Pro: 64/128 GB UFS 2.1 Mate 10 Porsche Design: 256 GB UFS 2.1
- Removable storage: microSD up to 256 GB (Mate 10) (uses SIM 2 slot)
- Battery: 4,000 mAh Li-Po battery
- Rear camera: 20MP Monochrome, 12MP RGB OIS, f/1.6, BSI CMOS, Dual-LED flash, PDAF+CAF+Laser+Depth AF, 2x Hybrid Zoom, 4K Video, RAW (DNG) (Only in 12MP Pro Mode), Leica Certified
- Front camera: 8MP FF f/2.0, 1080p Video
- Display: Max 730 Nits, HDR10 Mate 10: 5.9 in (150 mm) 16:9 2560x1440 RGBW LCD, 499 PPI, 16.7M Colours, Colour Saturation(NTSC): 96%, High Contrast: 1500:1 (Typical), 81.61% screen to body ratio; Mate 10 Pro/PD: 6 in (150 mm) 2:1 2160x1080 OLED, 402 PPI, 16.7M Colours, Colour Saturation(NTSC): 112%, High Contrast: 70000:1 (Typical), 81.79% screen to body ratio
- Sound: 3.5mm Headphone Jack (Mate 10), Stereo Speakers, 32-bit/384kHz Dual DAC, Active Noise Cancellation With Dedicated Mic
- Connectivity: Wi-Fi 2.4G/5G, 802.11a/b/g/n/ac with Wi-Fi Direct support, BT4.2, BLE, aptX/aptX HD and LDAC HD Audio, USB Type C 3.1, DisplayPort 1.2
- Data inputs: Fingerprint Sensor (Mate 10: Front, Mate 10 Pro/Porsche Design: Rear) All Models: GPS/Glonass/BDS, G-sensor, gyroscope, compass, ambient light sensor, proximity sensor, Hall sensor, barometer, infrared remote control
- SAR: Huawei Mate 10; Huawei Mate 10 Pro
- Other: Gorilla Glass 5, NFC Mate 10: IP53, Colors: Black, Pink Gold, Champagne Gold, Mocha Brown; Mate 10 Pro: IP67, Colors: Midnight Blue, Pink Gold, Titanium Grey, Mocha Brown; Mate 10 PD: IP67, Color: Diamond Black
- Website: Huawei Mate 10 Huawei Mate 10 Pro Huawei Mate 10 PD

The Huawei Mate 10, Huawei Mate 10 Pro and Huawei Mate 10 Lite are Android smartphones designed and marketed by Huawei as part of the Huawei Mate series. There is also a Mate 10 Porsche design, which has 256 GB of storage but is otherwise identical to the Mate 10 Pro. They were first released on 16 October 2017. Versus the predecessor Mate 9, the Mate 10 Pro flagship phone has a faster processor with an integrated neural processing unit, a slightly larger OLED screen (6.0-inch) with a taller 18:9 aspect ratio, a significantly longer battery life and a glass back construction (but free of wireless charging). Chinese and international models are available in dual SIM configuration. It comes with Android 8 and a newer version of Huawei's EMUI interface. All Mate 10 models are unlocked and GSM only. Huawei phones, including the Mate series, are not sold or financed through U.S. carriers due to pressure from U.S. intelligence agencies, though they are available from independent and online retailers.

The Mate 10 series was supplanted by the Mate 20 series as the flagship in October 2018.

== Specifications ==
Specification	Huawei Mate 10	Huawei Mate 10 Pro / Porsche Design
Chipset & CPU	HiSilicon Kirin 970 (10 nm):4× Cortex‑A73 @ 2.36 GHz + 4× Cortex‑A53 @ 1.8 GHz;built-in NPU	Same as Mate 10
GPU	ARM Mali‑G72 MP12 (12-core) @ ~850 MHz	Same
RAM / Storage	4 GB LPDDR4X + 64 GB UFS 2.1 (expandable via micro‑SD up to 256 GB using SIM 2 slot)	4 GB/6 GB + 64 GB or 6 GB + 128 GB UFS 2.1;Porsche Design: 6 GB + 256 GB; No micro‑SD slot
Display	5.9″ IPS LCD (RGBW), 2560×1440 (16:9), ~730 nits brightness,~81.61% screen-to-body ratio	6.0″ AMOLED (BOE), 2160×1080 (18:9), ~402 ppi,~81.79% screen-to-body ratio
Cameras	Rear: 12 MP RGB (f/1.6, OIS) + 20 MP monochrome (f/1.6) Front: 8 MP (f/2.0)	Same Leica-certified dual rear cameras; 8 MP front camera
Camera Features	PDAF, CAF, laser focus, hybrid zoom, RAW support, 4K video recording	Same features
Battery	4,000 mAh Li‑Po Fast charging (~58% in 30 min)	Same 4,000 mAh battery with fast charging
Build & Body	Glass front/back (Gorilla Glass 5), aluminum frame, front fingerprint sensor, 3.5 mm headphone jack, IP53 rating	Glass front/back (Gorilla Glass 5), aluminum frame, Rear fingerprint sensor, No headphone jack, IR blaster, IP67 rating
Connectivity & Extras	USB‑C, headphone jack, NFC, Wi‑Fi 802.11a/b/g/n/ac, Bluetooth 4.2, LTE Cat‑18, Desktop mode	USB‑C (no headphone jack), NFC, Wi‑Fi/ac, Bluetooth 4.2 (aptX/LDAC), LTE Cat‑18, IR blaster, Desktop mode
Software	Android 8.0 Oreo + EMUI 8.0 (launch version) Upgraded to EMUI 9/10/12 (last: EMUI 12 v12.0.0.223)	Same update path; Global EMUI 10/12 support as of 2022
Security Updates	Dropped from monthly patch schedule in early 2020 Last known: HarmonyOS patch v3.0.0.165 (Dec 2021, China)	Same as Mate 10
Launch / Availability	Released 16 October 2017 Replaced by Mate 20 series in October 2018	Released 16 October 2017 globally; Porsche Design variant at launch; No US carrier support

=== Huawei Mate 10 Lite ===
Huawei also released a “Lite” version of the Mate 10, also known as Huawei Nova 2i in Malaysia, Huawei Maimang 6 in China, and Huawei Honor 9i in India. It has budget features and pricing, ranking below the midrange P and Honor series phones.

Category	Specification
Model Names	Huawei Mate 10 Lite
Launch Date	October 2017
Build	Aluminum body with front glass
Dimensions	156.2 × 75.0 × 7.5 mm (6.15 × 2.96 × 0.30 in)
Weight	164 g (5.78 oz)
SIM Options	Single SIM (Nano-SIM) / Dual SIM (Nano-SIM, dual stand-by)
Display Type	IPS LCD
Display Size	5.9-inches
Display Resolution	1080×2160 pixels, 18:9 ratio (~409 ppi density)
Display Protection	Scratch-resistant glass (No official Gorilla Glass)
Chipset	HiSilicon Kirin 659 (16 nm)
CPU	Octa-core (4×2.36 GHz Cortex-A53 & 4×1.7 GHz Cortex-A53)
GPU	Mali-T830 MP2
Operating System	Android 7.0 (Nougat), EMUI 5.1
OS Upgradeable To	Android 8.0 (Oreo), EMUI 8.0
RAM	4 GB
Internal Storage	64 GB
Expandable Storage	microSD up to 256 GB (uses SIM 2 slot)
Rear Camera	Dual: 16 MP, f/2.2, PDAF + 2 MP (depth)
Front Camera	Dual: 13 MP, f/2.0 + 2 MP (depth)
Video Recording	1080p@30fps (front and rear)
Camera Features	HDR, panorama, LED flash
Battery Type	Non-removable Li-Ion 3340 mAh
Charging	10W standard (5V/2A), no fast charging
USB Type	microUSB 2.0, USB On-The-Go
Loudspeaker	Yes
3.5mm Headphone Jack	Yes
Audio Features	Active noise cancellation with dedicated mic
Wi-Fi	Wi-Fi 802.11 b/g/n, Wi-Fi Direct, hotspot
Bluetooth	4.2, A2DP, LE
GPS	Yes, with A-GPS, GLONASS, BDS
NFC	No
FM Radio	Yes
Infrared	No
Network Technology	GSM / HSPA / LTE
3G Bands	HSDPA 850 / 900 / 1900 / 2100
4G LTE Bands	Varies by region (generally LTE Cat4)
Network Speed	HSPA 42.2/5.76 Mbps, LTE Cat4 150/50 Mbps
Fingerprint Sensor	Rear-mounted
Other Sensors	Accelerometer, proximity, compass
Colors Available	Graphite Black, Prestige Gold, Aurora Blue

=== Software ===
The phones run on Android 8 “Oreo”, with Huawei's own custom skin, EMUI 8.0 on top of it. The previous EMUI version was 5.1. Huawei decided to upgrade it to EMUI 8.0 to match the latest Android version number, which is 8.0 as well. It has some new features, notably the desktop mode called “Easy Projection”, which is a custom desktop interface, similar to Samsung DeX, which appears when connecting the phone to a display via an HDMI-to-USB-C cable.

=== Models ===
The phones have at least 6 model designations, A09, AL00, TL00, L09, L29, and LOAC. The prefix BLA- designates a Mate 10 Pro, ALP-designates a Mate 10 and RNE- designates a Mate 10 Lite. Each model may come in two configurations for the Mate 10 pro, 4 GB/64 GB or 6 GB/128 GB. The Mate 10 Pro A09/L29 (Porsche) has a 6 GB/256 GB configuration. The BLA-LOAC model is an alternate name for the BLA-A09 model sold through special OEM arrangements at U.S. retailers like Best Buy. The A09/LOAC models are for U.S. distribution, the AL00 models are for China, the L09 and L29 models are for Europe and international distribution. The TL00 model appears to be a limited distribution Himalayan model, closely resembling the AL00 Chinese models. The L29 models are dual-sim variants of the L09/A09 models; the A00 models are also dual sim. There are some differences between the A09/LOAC and Lx9 models in GSM bands supported. There are 6 models of Mate 10 Lite, L01, L02, L03, L21, L22, and L23; L0x models are single SIM and L2x models are dual SIM; otherwise the Mate 10 Lite has a fixed configuration and the models differ only in geographic area of distribution and the local GSM frequencies supported there.

The Mate 10 is not marketed or sold in the US, though it is available online from international sellers. Also, no dual SIM models are sold in the U.S.

== Markets and release dates ==
The Kirin 970 SoC which powers the Mate 10 series was first unveiled at the 2017 Berlin IFA in early September. The Mate 10 series was initially released to select markets on Oct. 16, 2017, followed by U.K. and Europe in late 2017, then the United States on Feb. 18, 2018.

== Unlocking (rooting) the Mate 10/Pro ==
While it was originally intended to be an OEM/developer feature only, prior to May 24, 2018, Huawei freely supplied a bootloader unlock code to enable users/developers to root their devices. The URL to obtain the unlock code no longer exists. The company's announcement said: "Announcement: To provide better user experience and avoid issues caused by ROM flashing, the unlock code application service will be stopped for all products launched after 2018–5–24. For products released prior to this date, the service will be stopped 60 days after this announcement. Thank you for your understanding. We will continue to provide you with quality services. 2018-5-24 Huawei Device Co. Ltd." This was followed in June with an OTA named Patch01 that caused rooted phones to go into a bootloop until the original unrooted image was flashed. This image cannot be rooted.

== Performance ==
The performance of the Mate 10 and Mate 10 Pro, with identical CPU and GPU and clock frequencies, are very close. Due to its lower screen resolution, the Mate 10 Pro has a slight advantage, especially in graphics intensive applications. The performance of the Mate 10 Lite, with CPU and GPU 2-3 generations older, falls far below that of the flagship models.

Though the Mate 10 scores top the list of Android phones at Oct. 2017 release date, they fall well short of the A11 Fusion powered iPhone 8, 8+ and X, as well as the Snapdragon 845 powered devices released just a few months later.

Special note: the official Geekbench testing site excludes the Mate 10 and Mate 20 models other than the Lite models from the published results because it claims these models run the benchmarks in a special benchmark mode which does not reflect real world performance. Predecessor phones like the Mate 9 and P10 are not affected; only products released from 2Q 2017 and later. The list of benchmarks impacted is extensive: Geekbench, GFXbench, 3Dmark, Antutu, Quadrant, and others. These were not subtle differences, either, with results up to 47 percent higher than they were with private test variants Huawei couldn't catch. In some cases, the Mate 10 performed poorer on these internal benchmarks than the Kirin 960/Mali G71 powered Mate 9.

The company has since claimed that AI processes are responsible for allocating resources when heavy workloads are encountered. However, private benchmarks identical to the public ones except for the names of the apps, and embedded strings containing the names, show radically different performance. The company has stated that it will make 'Performance mode' available to ordinary users. It is not clear that GPU turbo (see below) is the putative performance mode.

=== GPU turbo ===
In Aug. 2018, Huawei introduced a 'GPU turbo' mode as a software only upgrade, and it is available at least for the Mate 10, Mate 10 Pro and Mate 10 Porsche design models. GPU turbo mode, the company claims, eliminates GPU throttling by using AI paradigms to predict invariant portions of the screen to reduce rendering effort and power consumption. The company does not claim that GPU turbo mode increases the maximum frame rate(s). The drawbacks for this technology are that it is per device (SoC) and per game — the device must be trained or tuned for each game and the profile data stored on the device. So far, only two games have been optimized for GPU turbo: PUBG and Legends: Bang, Bang. The company has also announced that GPU turbo will not be released to the United States market.

== Competitors ==
The Mate 10 series came out in the same month as the Apple iPhone 8 and iPhone 10 and were positioned as direct competitors of these as well as the Samsung Galaxy S8 series released in April 2017, though released at slightly lower price points. Other major competitors in the same timeframe were the OnePlus 5 and Google's Pixel 2 series.

== Reception ==
The Huawei Mate 10 series received mostly positive reviews, especially regarding the camera feature. DxOMark gave it an overall 97 points, similar to the more expensive iPhone X and only 1 point behind the Google Pixel 2. Most reviewers praised the long battery life, a result of the 4000 mAh battery, but criticized the heavily skinned EMUI software and the lack of certain features such as WLAN without MIMO, Bluetooth 5.0, and inductive charging for both models.

The Huawei Mate 10 Pro's lack of QHD+ resolution, storage expansion, and a headphone jack also received some criticism from reviewers. However, it was praised in other aspects like including a bright and accurate-color OLED display, LTE Cat. 18, Dual-VoLTE, Dual-SIM, aptX HD, good performance, very fast quick-charge technology, (theoretical) water and dust proofing (IP67), high build quality, exact location determination and excellent voice quality.

== See also ==
- Huawei P10
- List of Huawei phones
