= Huawei Ascend G330 =

Smartphone made by Huawei

Huawei Ascend G300
- Brand: Huawei
- Type: Smartphone
- First released: October 2012
- Related: Huawei Ascend P1
- Compatible networks: GSM/GPRS/EDGE 850/900/1800/1900 HSPA900/2100; HSDPA 7.2 Mbps HSUPA 5.76 Mbps
- Operating system: Android 4.0.4
- Display: Size 4.0″, Resolution WVGA (800x480 pixels)

Huawei Ascend G330 is a budget smartphone made by Huawei. It went on sale in October 2012.

It runs the Android 4.0.4 operating system. It has a 1 GHz dual core processor with 4GB internal storage with 2.5GB available for the user and 512MB of internal memory (RAM). The phone also has a 4.0 inch display and a 5.0MP rear camera.
