= Huawei Ascend P2 =

Android smartphone produced by Huawei

- Manufacturer: Huawei
- Type: Touchscreen smartphone
- Series: Huawei Ascend
- Availability by region: Germany May 13, 2013; UK June 3, 2013
- Predecessor: Huawei Ascend P1
- Successor: Huawei Ascend P6
- Compatible networks: 2.5G GSM/GPRS/EDGE – 850, 900, 1800, 1900 MHz 3G UMTS/HSPA+ – 900, 2100 MHz 4G LTE Rel. 8 (UE Cat 4) - 800, 1800, 2100, 2600
- Form factor: Slate
- Dimensions: 136.2 mm (5.36 in) H 66.7 mm (2.63 in) W 8.4 mm (0.33 in) D
- Weight: 122 g (4.3 oz)
- Operating system: Android 4.1 "Jelly Bean"
- CPU: 1.5 GHz quad-core Hi-Silicon K3V2
- Memory: 1 GB
- Storage: 16 GB
- Battery: 2420 mAh
- Rear camera: 13 megapixels 1080p full HD video recording @ 30fps auto focus, face detection, smile detection, digital zoom, geo tagging, high-dynamic-range mode (HDR)
- Front camera: 1.3 megapixels
- Display: 4.7 in (120 mm) IPS 315 ppi (1280×720); Corning Gorilla Glass 2.0
- Connectivity: List: Wi-Fi :802.11 b/g/n/ac (2.4 GHz); Hotspot (Wi-Fi); DLNA; GPS/GLONASS; NFC; Bluetooth 4.0; USB 2.0; USB On-The-Go; MHL 2.0
- Other: Accelerometer, Ambient light sensor, Gyroscope, Magnetometer, Proximity sensor
- Website: Huawei website

The Huawei Ascend P2 is a smartphone manufactured by Huawei. It was released in 2013. At the time, it was claimed to be the world's fastest smartphone. China's Huawei claimed that this device is the fastest (with full 4G support) in its own niche. According to the company it would use LTE category 4 to achieve network speeds up to 150 Mbit/s. It comes with a 4.7-inch high-definition screen with a powerful 1.5 GHz quad-core processor. It is sharp-cornered and its body is thinner than a pencil at 8.4 mm. Huawei announced that the Ascend P2 Android smartphone would launch in UK in June, 2013. It is available worldwide during July–September, i.e. the third quarter of 2013.

It is similar to the Huawei STREAM X GL07S.

== Software ==
The Ascend P2 ships with Android 4.1 "Jelly Bean" with Huawei's Emotion UI version 1.6.
