= Huawei Pura 80 =

Mobile phone

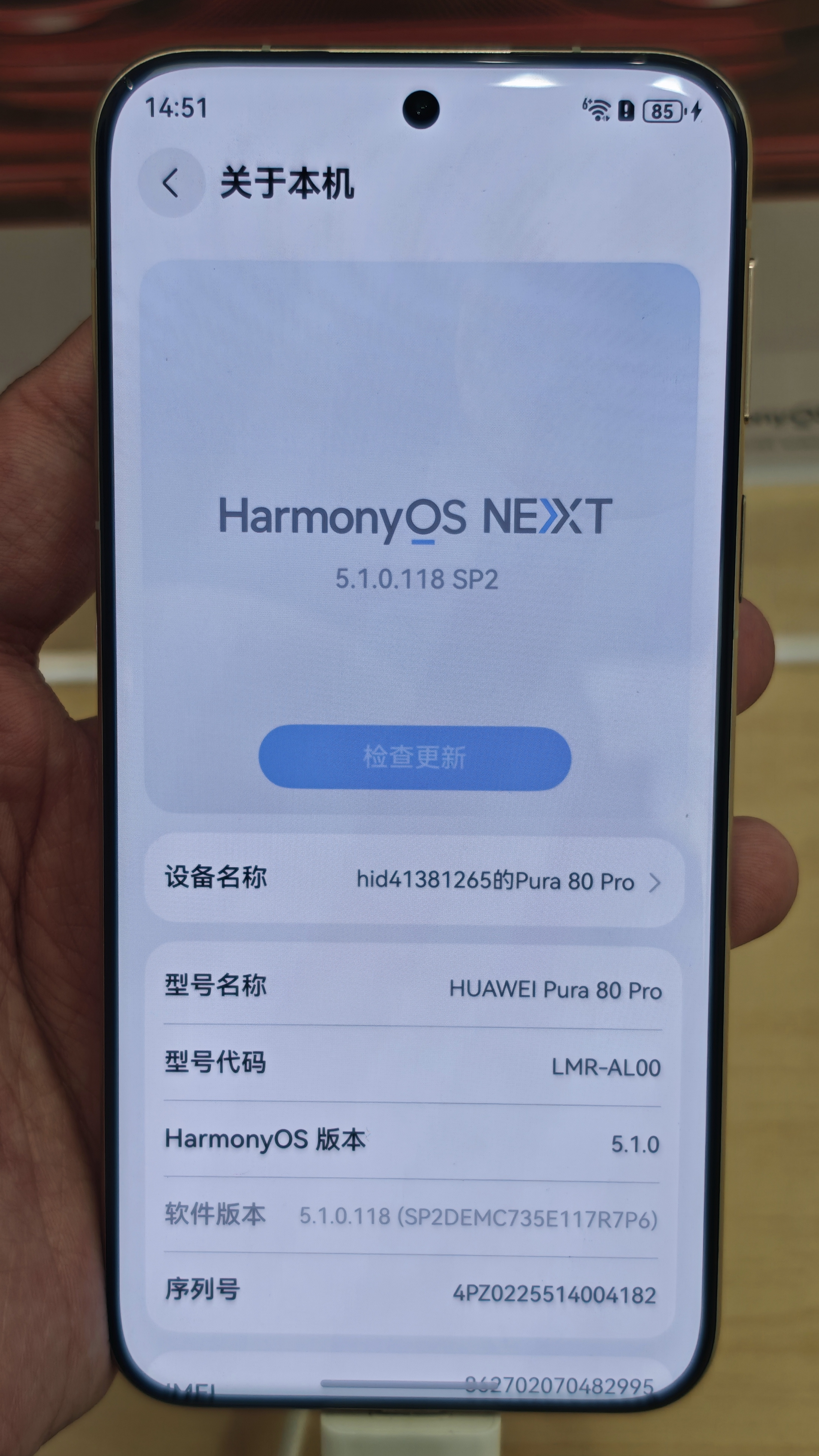
- Huawei Pura80 Pro
- Manufacturer: Huawei
- Type: Smartphone
- Series: Huawei Pura
- First released: 11 June 2025
- Availability by region: China, Southeast Asia, Europe
- Predecessor: Huawei Pura 70
- Compatible networks: 2G, 3G, 4G, 5G
- Operating system: China: Harmony OS 5.1 (current: HarmonyOS 6); International: EMUI
- System-on-chip: Pura 80: Kirin 9010S; All other versions: Kirin 9020
- Memory: Pura 80/80 Pro：12GB Pura 80 Pro+/Ultra：16GB
- Storage: Pura 80/80 Pro：256GB/512GB/1TB Pura 80Pro+/Ultra：512GB/1TB
- Removable storage: No support for memory card expansion
- Battery: Pura 80: Li-Po 5600 mAh (typical value), non-removable or replaceable Pura 80 Pro/Pro+/Ultra: Li-Po 5700 mAh (typical value), non-removable or replaceable
- Charging: Pura 80: 66W wired / 50W wireless Pura 80 Pro/Pro+/Ultra: 100W wired / 80W wireless
- Website: https://consumer.huawei.com/cn/phones/pura80/}

Huawei Pura 80 (stylized as HUAWEI Pura80) is a series of high-end smartphones manufactured by Huawei and released in the Chinese market on 11 June 2025. It succeeds the Huawei Pura 70 series and comprises four models: the Pura 80, Pura 80 Pro, Pura 80 Pro+, and Pura 80 Ultra.

The standard Pura 80 model is powered by the Kirin 9010S 5G chip, while the remaining variants utilise the HiSilicon Kirin 9020 5G chip.

In China, the smartphone series run on the HarmonyOS operating system. The versions Pura 80 Pro and Ultra were launched in Europe in October 2025, where they utilise the Android-based EMUI operating system, however. October 2025 also saw the launch of the series in Indonesia, for instance.

== Features ==
=== Software ===
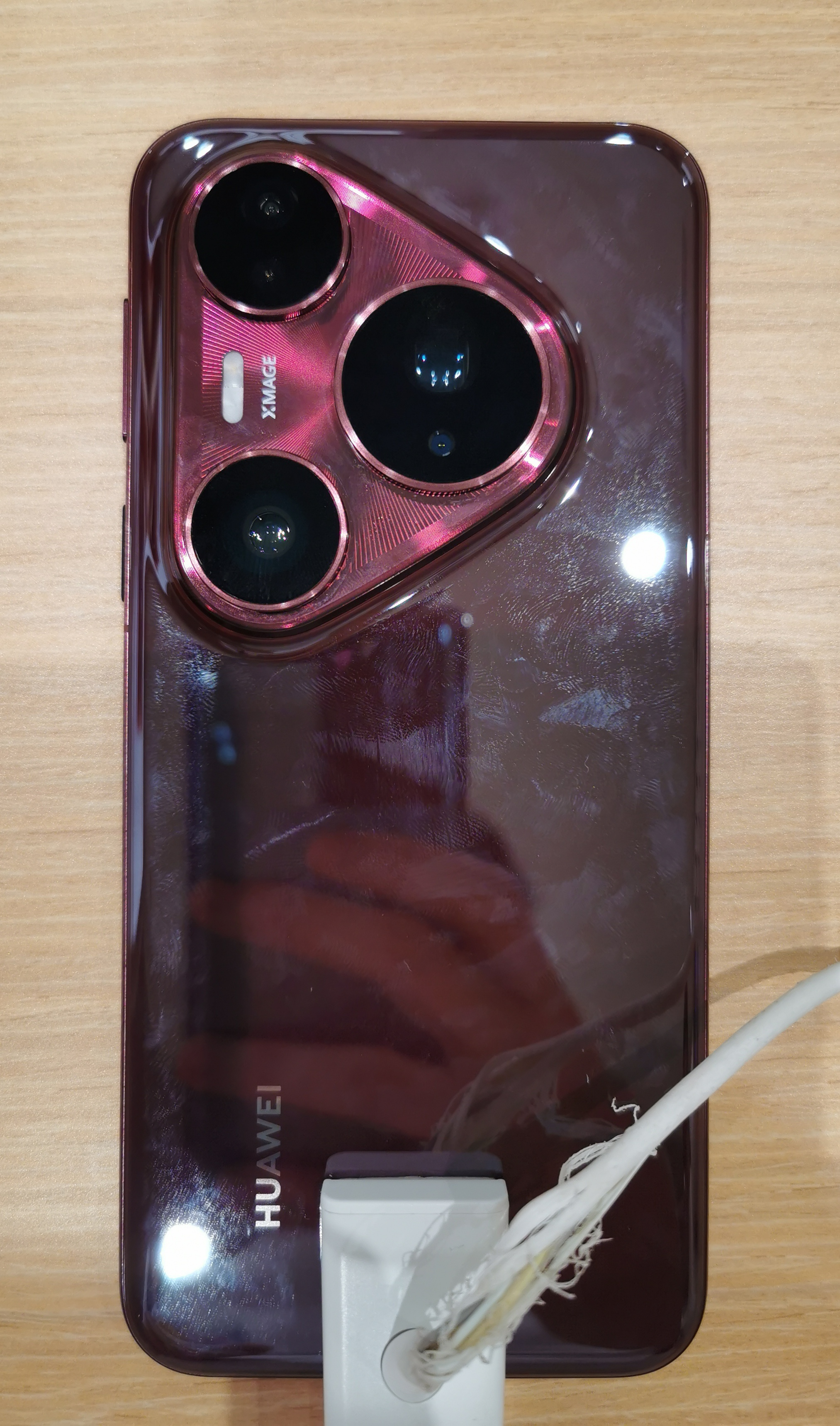
The Huawei Pura 80 Pro in Glazed Red

The Pura 80 series runs on the HarmonyOS operating system and features AI privacy protection, alerting others when they are being observed while the screen is active. Outside of China, e.g. in Germany or South Africa, the Pura 80 smartphones (only the Pro and Ultra versions are offered in Europe) run on the Android-based EMUI operating system.

=== Performance ===
The Pura 80 series delivers approximately 36% improved performance compared to the Pura 70 Pro+.However popular mobile bechmark antutu reveals a performance uplift of upto 40% in some areas such as memory. Control responsiveness has been improved by 47%.

The HarmonyOS version of Alipay on the Pura80 series achieves a 50% faster card swiping speed compared to the previous generation.

=== Imagery ===
The Pura 80 Ultra features a 1-inch RYYB sensor with ultra-high dynamic range imaging for its primary camera, compatible with a dual telephoto lens system. Software features include AI-assisted composition, intelligently recommending framing options, and an ultra-clear panorama mode, which stitches together three wide-angle images to produce high-quality panoramic shots.

Additionally, the Ultra variant introduces Huawei's customisable color palette feature for the camera, alongside AI-powered glare reduction technology. Richard Yu stated that the Pura 80 series incorporates "the most expensive camera module ever used." The repair price indicates that the telephoto module alone costs 2,899 yuan.

== Response ==
QuickTech reported that sales figures indicated that the smartphone series faced considerable pressure at launch compared to the preceding Pura 70 series. Within less than a month of launch, the price was dropped by ¥800, with Huawei thereby hoping to increase sales of the new HarmonyOS devices.

A report by Reuters on the launch of the Pura 80 series on 11 June 2025 mentioned that many internet users (for example on the microblogging platform Weibo) were interested in the launch because they see Huawei smartphones as defying US sanctions. User reactions were reported as being mixed, however: many praised the camera capabilities of the smartphone and its sleek design; other internet users complained about the high prices.
