= Huawei Ascend Y530 =

2014 smartphone model

- Brand: Huawei
- Manufacturer: Huawei
- Type: Smartphone
- Series: Ascend
- First released: February 2014; 12 years ago
- Discontinued: Yes
- Compatible networks: GSM / HSPA
- Form factor: Slate
- Colors: Black; White; Red; Yellow
- Dimensions: 132.5 mm (5.22 in) H 67 mm (2.6 in) W 9.3 mm (0.37 in) D
- Weight: 145 g (5.1 oz)
- Operating system: Android 4.3 (Jelly Bean)
- System-on-chip: Qualcomm MSM8210 Snapdragon 200 (28 nm)
- CPU: Dual-core 1.2 GHz Cortex-A7
- GPU: Adreno 302
- Memory: 512 MB RAM
- Storage: 4 GB
- Removable storage: microSDHC (dedicated slot)
- SIM: Micro-SIM
- Battery: Li-Ion 1750 mAh, removable
- Rear camera: 5 MP, AF, LED flash, 720p@30fps
- Front camera: VGA
- Display: 4.5 inches TFT, 480 x 854 pixels, 16:9 ratio (~217 ppi density)
- Model: Y530-U00, Y530-U051

The Huawei Ascend Y530 is an entry-level Android smartphone manufactured and designed by Huawei. It was released on February 17, 2014, in the United Kingdom, then on June 24 for Poland by T-Mobile with Talk2.

== Specifications ==
=== Hardware ===
The Ascend Y530 was powered by a 28-mn Qualcomm MSM8210 Snapdragon 200 processor paired with a dual-core 1.2 GHz Cortex-A7 central processor and an Adreno 302 graphics processor. It has a user-replaceable li-ion battery, with a capacity of 1750 mAh.

The display contains a 4.5-inch TFT display with a resolution of 480 × 854 pixels (16:9). It has a pixel density of 217 pixels per inch.

Its internal storage is limited to 512MB of RAM and 4GB of storage. It includes a 5MP primary camera with recording capability of 720p and a front-facing VGA camera.

=== Software ===
The Ascend Y530 runs on Android 4.3 Jelly Bean interfaced with Huawei's Emotion UI.
