= Huawei Ascend Mate =

Smartphone model

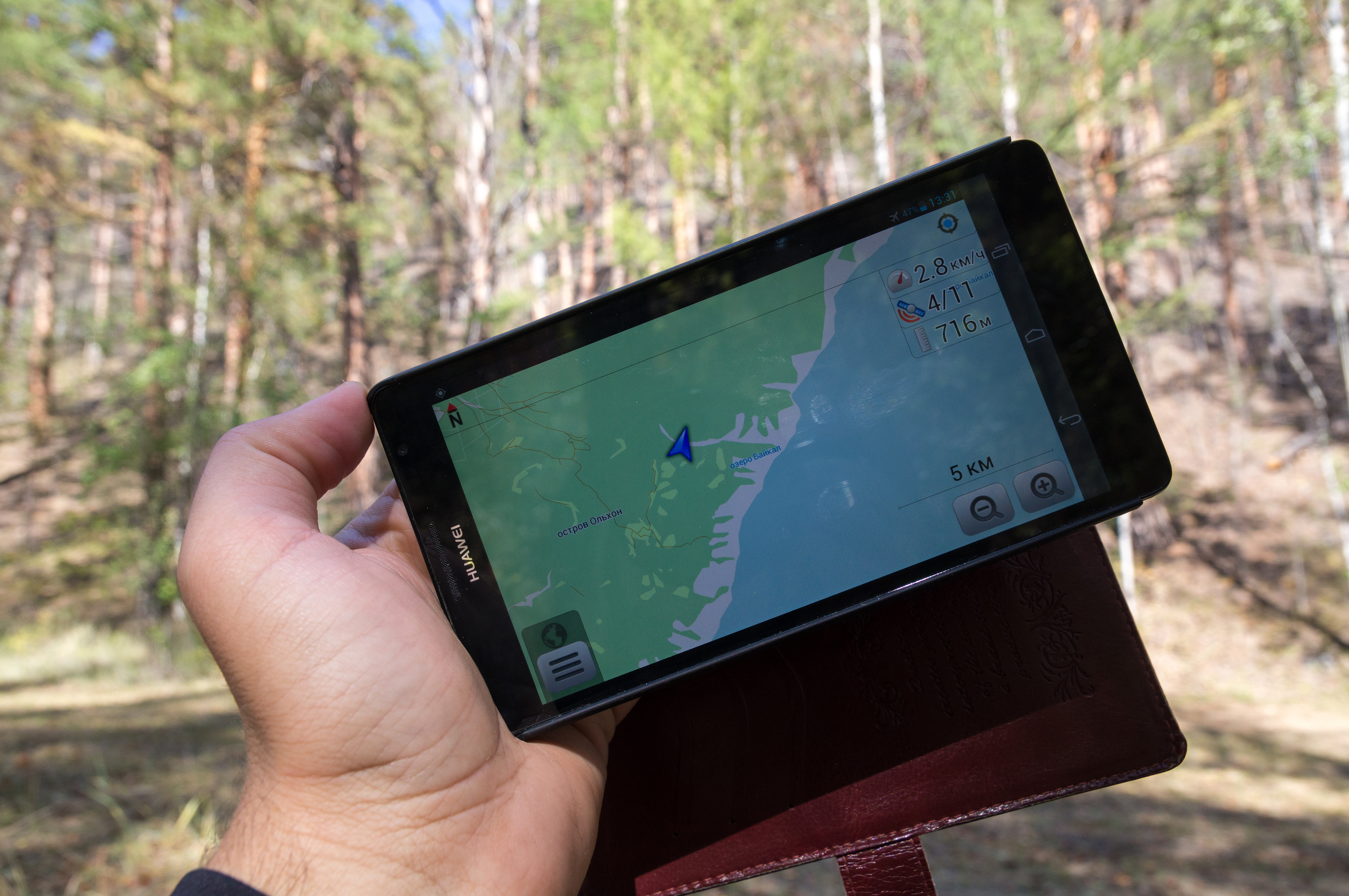
- Manufacturer: Huawei
- Type: Smartphone
- Series: Huawei Mate
- Successor: Huawei Ascend Mate 2 4G
- Compatible networks: UMTS 850/900/1700/1900/2100 MHz; GSM 850/900/1800/1900 MHz
- Form factor: Bar
- Dimensions: 163.5 mm (6.44 in) H 85.7 mm (3.37 in) W 9.9 mm (0.39 in) D
- Weight: 198 g (7.0 oz)
- Operating system: Android 4.1
- CPU: 1.5 GHz quad-core Hi-Silicon K3V2, with Intel XMM6260 baseband
- Memory: 1 GB or 2 GB
- Battery: 4050 mAh
- Rear camera: 8.0-megapixel AF with HDR
- Front camera: 1.0-megapixel HD
- Display: 6.1-inch IPS panel, 1280×720 pixels
- Connectivity: 802.11 a/b/g/n, dual-band, DLNA, Wi-Fi Direct, Wi-Fi hotspot Bluetooth 4.0 LE EDR
- Website: Huawei website, Official US Huawei Store

The Huawei Ascend Mate is an Android smartphone manufactured by the Chinese telecommunications company Huawei. The Ascend Mate was officially unveiled at the 2013 International CES in Las Vegas, and was released in China in February 2013 with an international release following in March. It is the first device in the Huawei Mate series.

The Ascend Mate features a 6.1-inch screen, and a 4050 mAh battery rated as having over 22 hours of talk time (in comparison to the close to 17 hours achieved by the Samsung Galaxy Note II Vs LG Optimus G Pro Vs Google Nexus 7 Vs iPad (3rd generation) Vs HTC One X).

The Ascend Mate was developed as a part of a shift by Huawei to produce more higher-end devices, while CEO Richard Yu also considered the phablet to be the future of smartphones due to their "all-in-one" nature.

== Hardware ==
The Ascend Mate includes a 1.5 GHz quad-core processor with 1 or 2 GB of RAM. The device incorporates a 6.1-inch 720p IPS display, which the company considers to be the largest screen ever used on a smartphone. The Ascend Mate's display takes up 73% of its face, allowing it to maintain a relatively compact form factor. The screen also incorporates a feature marketed as "Magic Touch", which allows the capacitive touchscreen to be used while wearing gloves (similarly to the Nokia Lumia 920). The device also includes an 8-megapixel rear camera, and a 1-megapixel front-facing camera. The design of the Ascend Mate uses a rounded build with a non-removable plastic cover on its rear, a front covered in Gorilla Glass, and a metallic frame around its edges. The rim of the device incorporates a top-mounted 3.5 mm headphone jack, microSD slot, volume rocker, power button, and camera shutter button. The Ascend Mate uses software menu buttons as implemented by the Android operating system.

== Software ==
The Ascend Mate ships with Android 4.1 with Huawei's Emotion UI. Software features include floating windows for multi-tasking, an option which shifts the keyboard and dial pad to one side of the screen for one-handed use, a navigation feature which uses augmented reality, and which allows quick access to calculator, notes, text messages, and videos.

== Reception ==
The Ascend Mate received mixed reception at CES. Ubergizmo felt that the Ascend Mate had a "very good" build quality comparable to the Galaxy Note II, and was also only slightly heavier as well. Despite believing that the Emotion UI was not as clean as stock Android, its smooth performance, camera, and the presence of a high-capacity battery were considered to be positive aspects of the device. TechRadar noted that while the large size and lack of grip made the Ascend Mate trickier to hold than even the Galaxy Note II, and the one-handed mode on its keyboard was also difficult to use, its screen had good viewing angles and was good for viewing photos and videos. Still, the viability and marketability of a phone with such a large screen was questioned.
