= Huawei Ascend P6 =

Android smartphone produced by Huawei

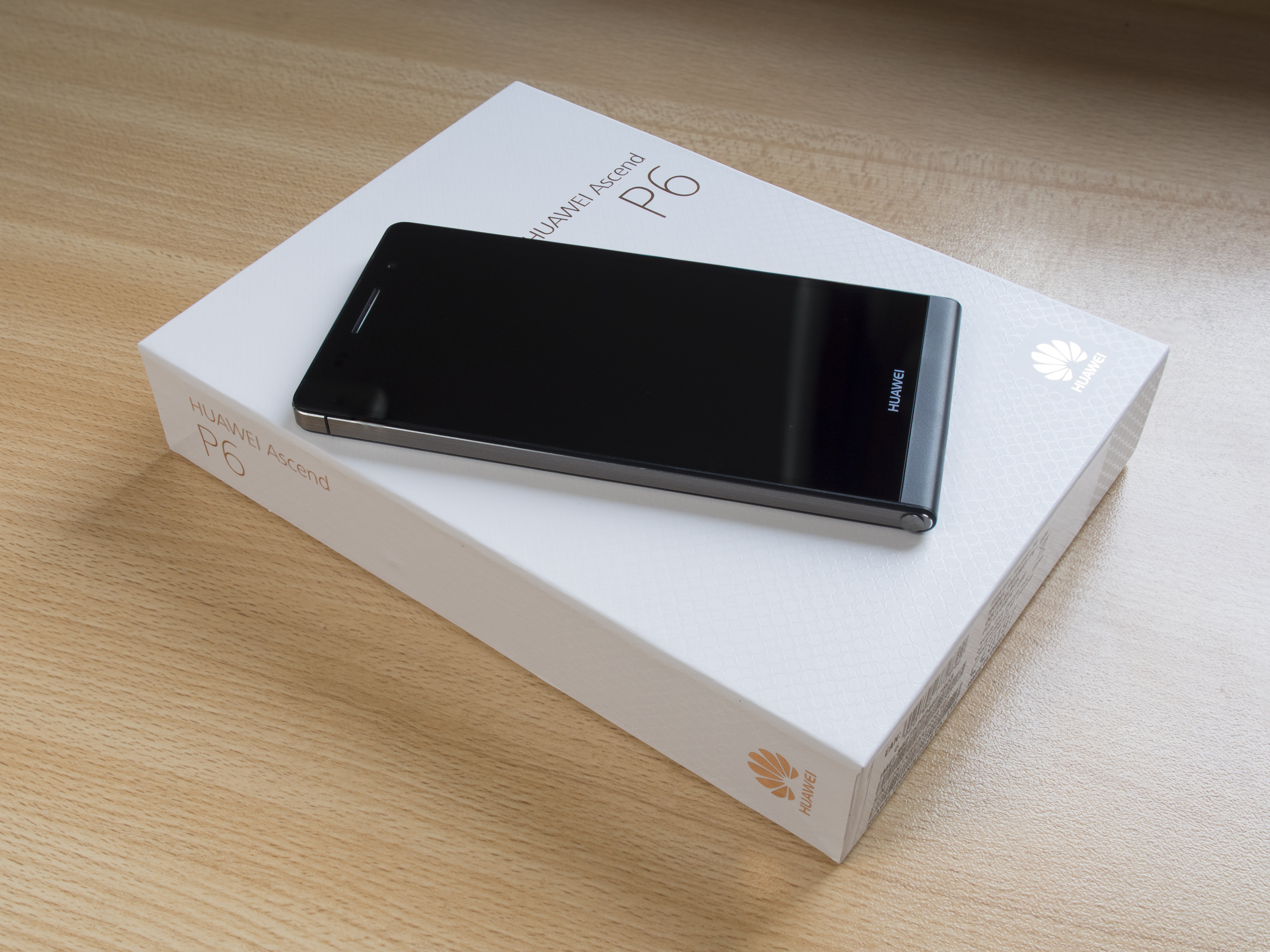
- Manufacturer: Huawei
- Type: Smartphone
- Series: Huawei Ascend
- First released: June 18, 2013; 13 years ago
- Predecessor: Huawei Ascend P2
- Successor: Huawei Ascend P7
- Compatible networks: GSM 850 900 1800 1900; HSPA+ 850 900 1700 1900 2100
- Form factor: Slate
- Dimensions: 132.65 mm (5.222 in) H 65.5 mm (2.58 in) W 6.18 mm (0.243 in) D
- Weight: 120 g (4.2 oz)
- Operating system: Original: Android 4.2.2 "Jelly Bean" with EMUI 1.6; Current: Android 4.4.2 "KitKat" with EMUI 3.0
- CPU: 1.5 GHz quad-core Hi-Silicon K3V2
- GPU: Vivante GC4000
- Memory: 2 GB
- Storage: 8 GB, 16 GB
- Removable storage: microSD up to 32 GB
- Battery: 2000 mAh
- Rear camera: 8 MP (3264×2448 px max.); 1080p Full HD video recording
- Front camera: 5 MP (2592×1952 px max.); 720p HD video recording
- Display: 4.7 in (120 mm)
- Sound: Dolby Digital Plus
- Connectivity: List: Wi-Fi :802.11 b/g/n (2,4 GHz); Hotspot (Wi-Fi); DLNA; GPS/GLONASS; Bluetooth 3.0; USB 2.0; USB On-The-Go
- Other: Ambient light sensor, Gyroscope, Magnetometer, Proximity sensor, Tilt sensor
- Website: Huawei Ascend P6 Specifications

Huawei Ascend P6 (also known as the Huawei P6) is a high-end smartphone, manufactured by the Chinese technology manufacturer, Huawei Technologies, which was introduced in March 2013 and released in June 2013.

== Overview ==
Huawei's flagship model features an aluminum body with a brushed texture on the rear. The Ascend P6 is available in white, black and pink colors. It also features a silver metallic stripe on the sides similar to the Apple iPhone 4. The charger slot is located on the upper side. The power button and the 3.5mm jack are on the right side, along with the SD card and SIM slot. The headphone jack is on the left. The Ascend P6 features a protective Corning Gorilla Glass layer along with a 720p IPS-LCD. It features an 8 MP rear camera and a 5 MP front camera, and is powered by a Hisilicon K3V2 (Quad-Core 1.5 GHz) processor with 2GB RAM.

== Software ==
The Ascend P6 ships with Android 4.2.2 with Huawei's Emotion UI 1.6. It is upgradable to Android 4.4 "KitKat" with Huawei's Emotion UI 3.0.

== Reception ==
Critics and fans praised the phone for its 6.18mm slim profile, display and design; however, it was panned for its poor sound quality. Customers also complained of the phone's poor cooling system.
