= Huawei Ascend G600 =

Android smartphone made by Huawei

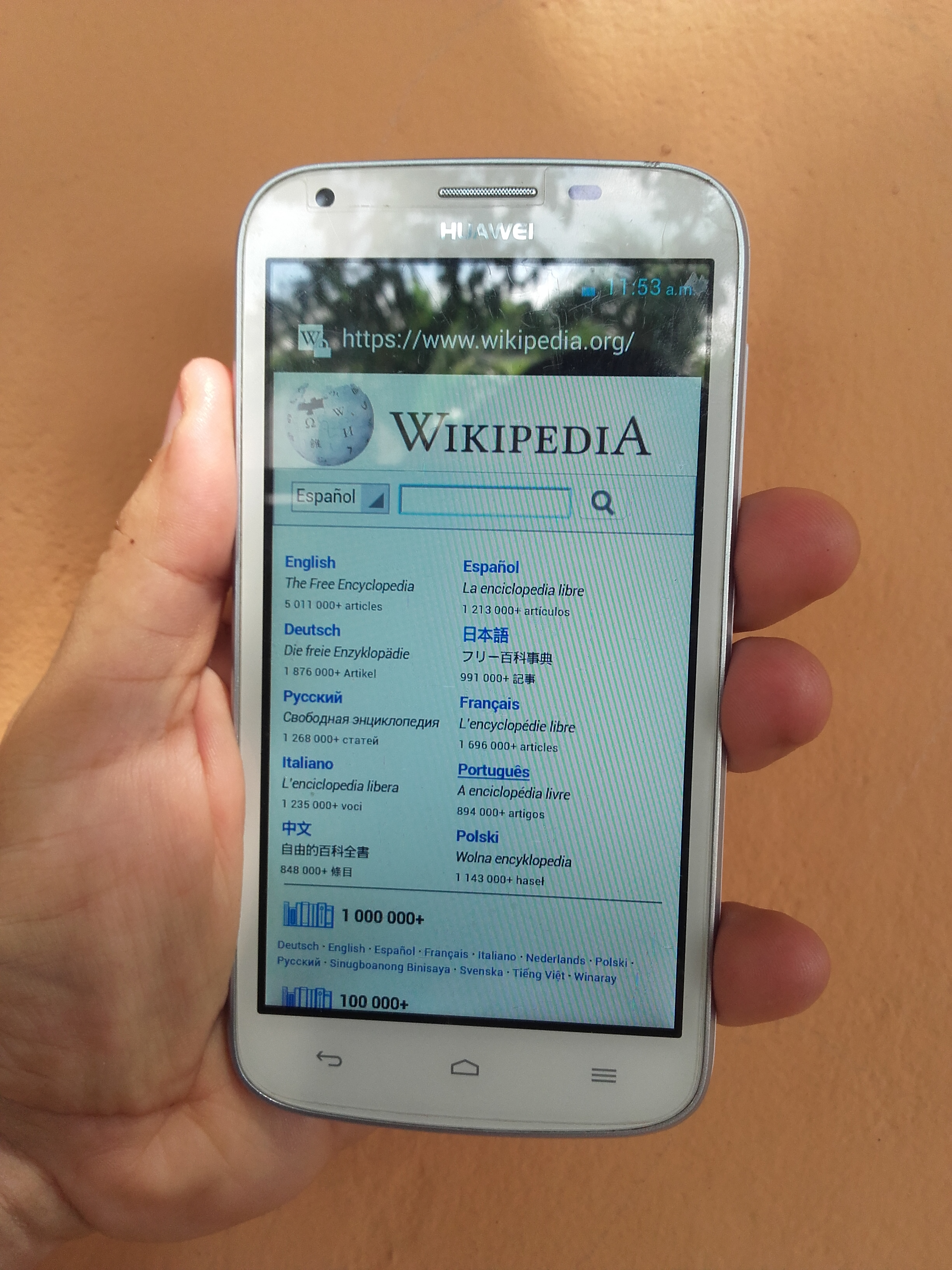
A Huawei Ascend G600 displaying Wikipedia

The Huawei Ascend G600 is an Android smartphone made by Huawei. It was released in 2012 during August.

== Models ==
The phone comes in the following 4 different models, all supported by the Google Play Store:

- HUAWEI U8950N-1
- HUAWEI U8950N-51
- HUAWEI U8950-1
- HUAWEI U8950D

The first letter of each model is the network: U = UMTS (WCDMA) and C = CDMA. The last D stands for Dual Sim feature. Note that the U8950 G600 sold outside China, is single sim. C8950D is the CDMA dual sim version.

The HUAWEI U8950N-1 & HUAWEI U8950N-51 appear to be American / Australian models, while the HUAWEI U8950D is the Chinese model.

== Specifications ==
Though the phone would be classed as 'mid-range', its hardware and features allow it to fall into the upper range of mid-range phones. So essentially, it just borderlines high range.

For full, in-depth specifications, visit the following link: http://www.gsmarena.com/huawei_ascend_g600-4963.php

=== Summary of phone specs ===
- 2G/3G Support
- NFC
- 540 × 960 4.5-inch screen
- 4 GB Internal Storage
- 768 MB RAM
- Qualcomm Snapdragon S4 Play (MSM8225) dual core 1.2 GHz ARM Cortex-A5 processor
- MicroSD support up to 32 GB
- Android ICS 4.0.4
- 8 MP Camera with high-quality VGA video recording
- Secondary 0.3 MP Camera
- HTML 5 Support
- 1930 mAh battery, providing up to 360 hours of stand-by time and roughly 8 hours of talk time.

== Rooting and unlocking bootloader ==
'csfrank271' published an in-depth article on XDA developers about unlocking the bootloader and gaining root access. The rooting method, though only supposed to work for the U8950D, works perfectly fine on the U8950N-51 model too. The article can be found here:

http://forum.xda-developers.com/showthread.php?p=36251172#post36251172
