= Huawei Ascend G300 =

Budget smartphone made by Huawei

- Brand: Huawei
- Type: Smartphone
- First released: April 13, 2012
- Related: Huawei Ascend P1
- Compatible networks: GSM/GPRS/EDGE 850/900/1800/1900 HSPA 850/900/1700/1900/2100; HSDPA 7.2 Mbps HSUPA 5.76 Mbps
- Operating system: Android Android 2.3.6 "Gingerbread" upgradable to Android 4.0 "Ice Cream Sandwich"
- Display: Size 4.0″, Resolution WVGA (800x480 pixels)

Huawei Ascend G300 is a budget smartphone made by Huawei. It went on sale in April 2012 exclusively to Vodafone UK.

It initially ran the Android 2.3.6 (Gingerbread) operating system. An update to Android 4.0 "Ice Cream Sandwich" has been released to Vodafone customers in October 2012. It has a 1 GHz processor with 4GB internal storage with 2.5GB available for the user and 512MB of internal memory. The phone also has a 4.0 inch display and a 5.0MP rear camera. The screen is protected by Corning Gorilla Glass.

The phone was released with the slogan "Why pay first class for first class?"
