= Huawei Ascend P1 =

Android smartphone produced by Huawei

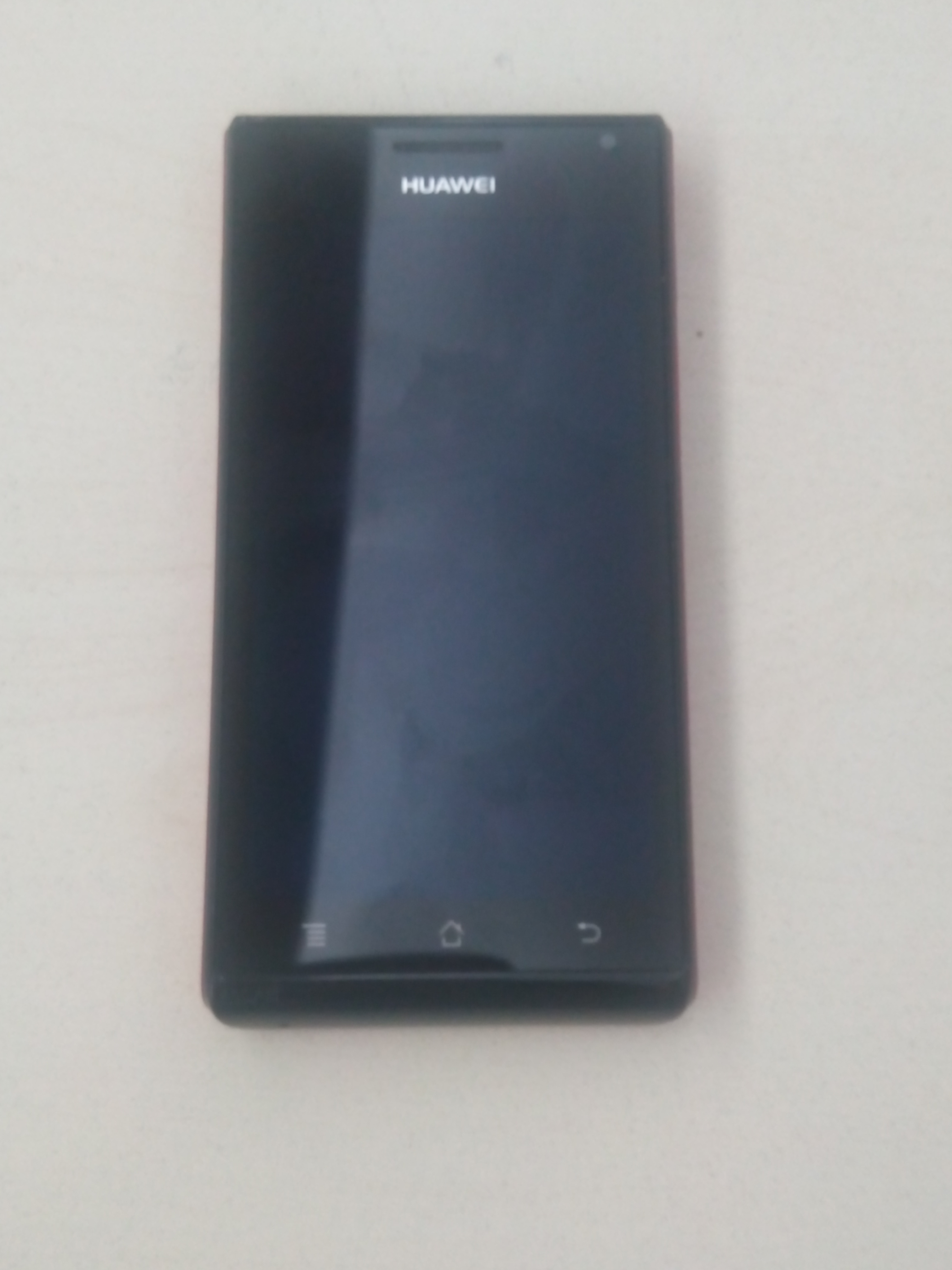
- Manufacturer: Huawei
- Type: Smartphone
- Series: Ascend P
- First released: July 19, 2012 (Canada)
- Successor: Huawei Ascend P2
- Related: Huawei Ascend P1 XL; Huawei Ascend P1 S Huawei Ascend P1 LTE
- Compatible networks: HSPA+
- Form factor: Slate
- Dimensions: 127.4 mm (5.02 in) H 64.8 mm (2.55 in) W 7.7 mm (0.30 in)
- Weight: 110 g (3.9 oz)
- Operating system: Android 4.0 "Ice Cream Sandwich" (upgradable to Android 4.2 Jelly Bean)
- CPU: 1.5 GHz dual-core
- Memory: 1 GB RAM
- Storage: 4 GB
- Removable storage: microSD up to 32 GB
- Battery: 1670 mAh
- Rear camera: 8 MP
- Front camera: 1.3 MP
- Display: 4.3 inch qHD (540 x 960) Super AMOLED display
- Data inputs: GPS, accelerometer, gyroscope, compass, proximity sensor

The Huawei Ascend P1 is an Android-based smartphone manufactured by Huawei. It shipped with Android 4.0 "Ice Cream Sandwich". The device features a 4.3-inch qHD capacitive touch screen, 1.5 GHz dual-core processor, 3.5 mm headphone jack, 8-megapixel rear-facing camera, 1.3-megapixel front-facing camera, as well as an accelerometer and a compass. The QHD capacitive touch screen is multitouch capable. It has been released in Canada exclusively for Wind Mobile and is available with or without a subsidy.

== Advertising ==
Wind, Huawei, Alliance Films and Lionsgate promoted the Ascend P1 by hosting a contest where winners had the chance to watch the premiere of The Expendables 2 and win the advertised smartphone.

== See also ==
- Huawei Ascend series
