= HiSilicon =

Chinese fabless semiconductor manufacturing company, fully owned by Huawei

HiSilicon Co., Ltd.
- Native name: 海思技术有限公司
- Type: Subsidiary
- Industry: Fabless semiconductors, Semiconductors, Integrated circuit design
- Founded: 1991; 35 years ago
- Headquarters: Shenzhen, Guangdong, China
- Products: SoCs
- Brands: Kirin; Gigahome; Kunpeng; Balong; Ascend
- Parent: Huawei
- Website: www.hisilicon.com

HiSilicon
- Simplified Chinese: 海思技术有限公司
- Traditional Chinese: 海思技術有限公司
- Literal meaning: Haisi Technology Limited Company
Transcriptions
Standard Mandarin
- Hanyu Pinyin: Hǎisī Jìshù Yǒuxiàn Gōngsī

HiSilicon (Chinese: 海思; pinyin: Hǎisī) is a Chinese fabless semiconductor company based in Shenzhen, Guangdong province and wholly owned by Huawei. HiSilicon purchases licenses for CPU designs from ARM Holdings, including the ARM Cortex-A9 MPCore, ARM Cortex-M3, ARM Cortex-A7 MPCore, ARM Cortex-A15 MPCore, ARM Cortex-A53, ARM Cortex-A57 and also for their Mali graphics cores. HiSilicon has also purchased licenses from Vivante Corporation for their GC4000 graphics core.

HiSilicon is reputed to be the largest domestic designer of integrated circuits in China. In 2020, the United States instituted rules that require any American firms providing equipment to HiSilicon or non-American firms who use American technologies or IPR (such as TSMC) that supply HiSilicon to have licenses as part of the ongoing trade dispute, and Huawei announced it will stop producing its Kirin chipsets from 15 September 2020 onwards due to this disruption of its supply chain. On 29 August 2023, Huawei announced the first fully domestically fabricated chip, the Kirin 9000S, which Huawei went on to use on the Mate 60 Pro phablet series of phones and MatePad 13.2 tablets.

== History ==
HiSilicon was Huawei's ASIC design center, which was founded in 1991.

- 2004– Shenzhen HiSilicon Semiconductor Co., Ltd. was registered and the company was formally established.
- 2016– HiSilicon's Kirin 960 chipset was rated one of the "best of Android 2016" in performance by Android Authority.
- 2019– Shanghai HiSilicon, a wholly owned subsidiary of Huawei, was established.
- 2025– First HiSilicon 7nm N+2 Kirin X90 series PC class in-house ARM-powered chips launched for MateBook Pro, MateBook Fold and MatePad Edge HarmonyOS powered computers following Intel and Qualcomm chip May 2024 bans.
- 2026–HiSilicon's first in-house CMOS camera series, CS520V200 50 megapixel camera with 4K 50FPS and 1080p 120FPS support with Hi3519DV500 4K30 AI ISP camera chip.

== Smartphone application processors ==
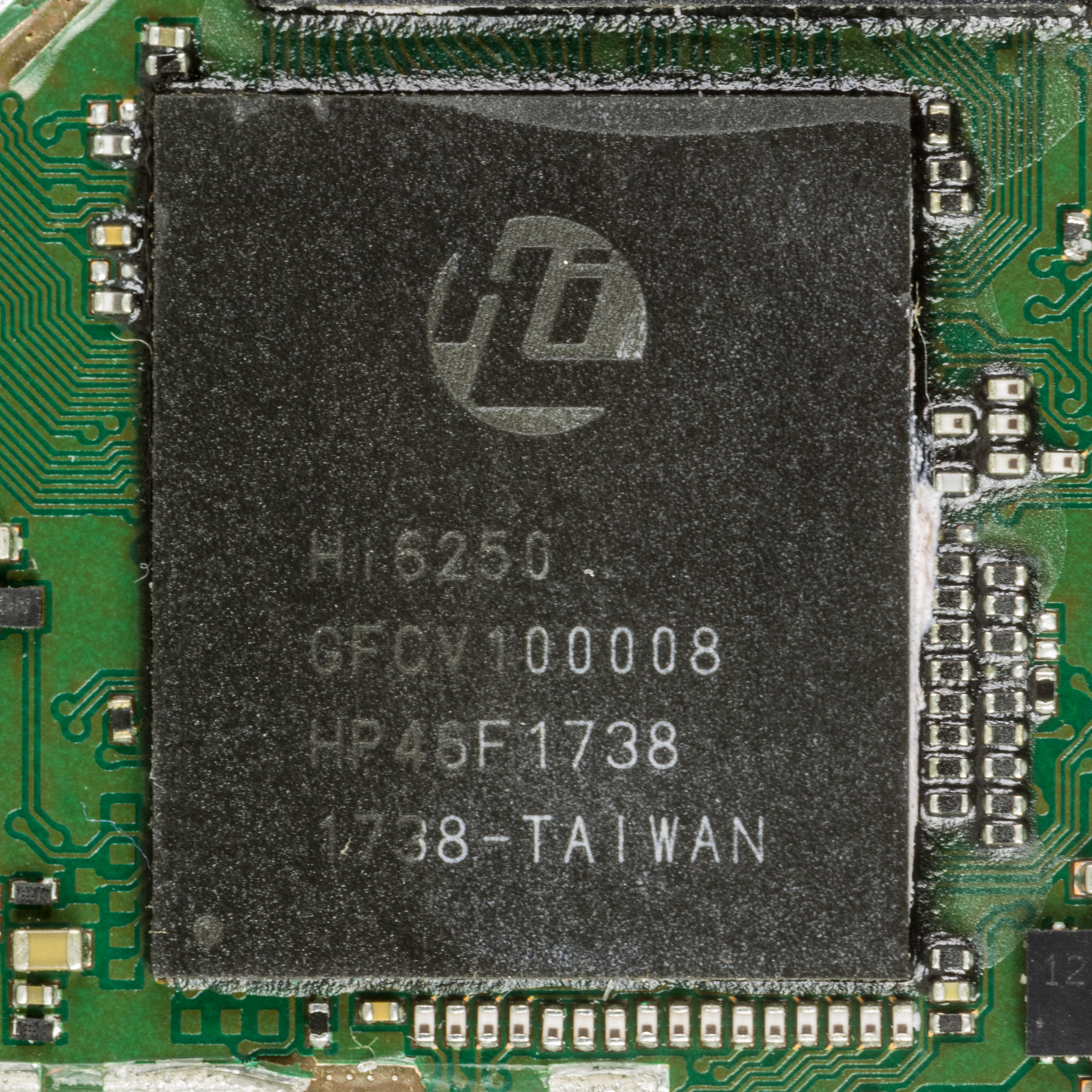
HiSilicon Hi6250

HiSilicon develops SoCs based on the ARM architecture. Though not exclusive, these SoCs see preliminary use in handheld and tablet devices of its parent company Huawei.

=== K3V2 ===
The first well known product of HiSilicon is the K3V2 used in Huawei Ascend D Quad XL (U9510) smartphones and Huawei MediaPad 10 FHD7 tablets. This chipset is based on the ARM Cortex-A9 MPCore fabbed at 40 nm and uses a 16 core Vivante GC4000 GPU. The SoC supports LPDDR2-1066, but actual products are found with LPDDR-900 instead for lower power consumption.

Model Number	Fab	CPU				GPU			Memory Technology			Nav	Wireless			Sampling availability	Devices using
Model Number	Fab	ISA	Microarchitecture	Cores	Frq (GHz)	Microarchitecture	Frq (MHz)	Performance (GFLOPS)	Type	Bus width (bit)	Bandwidth (GB/s)	Nav	Cellular	WLAN	PAN	Sampling availability	Devices using
K3V2 (Hi3620)	40 nm	ARMv7	Cortex-A9 L1: 32 KB instruction + 32 KB data, L2: 1 MB	4	1.4	Vivante GC4000	240	15.3	LPDDR2	64-bit (2x32-bit Dual-channel)	8.5 (533 MHz)	—N/a	—N/a	—N/a	—N/a	Q1 2012	List: Huawei MediaPad 10 FHD, Huawei Ascend D2 (U9510), Huawei Honor 2 (U9508), Huawei Ascend P6, Huawei Ascend P6S, Huawei Ascend P2, Huawei Ascend Mate, Lenovo A376, STREAM X (GSL07S)

=== K3V2E ===
This is a revised version of K3V2 SoC with improved support of Intel baseband. The SoC supports LPDDR2-1066, but actual products are found with LPDDR-900 instead for lower power consumption.

Model Number	Fab	CPU				GPU			Memory Technology			Nav	Wireless			Sampling availability	Devices using
Model Number	Fab	ISA	Microarchitecture	Cores	Frq (GHz)	Microarchitecture	Frq (MHz)	Performance (GFLOPS)	Type	Bus width (bit)	Bandwidth (GB/s)	Nav	Cellular	WLAN	PAN	Sampling availability	Devices using
K3V2E (Hi3620)	40 nm	ARMv7	Cortex-A9 L1: 32 KB instruction + 32 KB data, L2: 1 MB	4	1.5	Vivante GC4000	240	15.3	LPDDR2	64-bit (2x32-bit Dual-channel)	8.5 (533 MHz)	—N/a	—N/a	—N/a	—N/a	2013	List: Huawei Honor 3

=== Kirin 620 ===
• supports – USB 2.0 / 13 MP / 1080p video encode

Model Number	Fab	CPU				GPU			Memory Technology			Nav	Wireless			Sampling availability	Devices using
Model Number	Fab	ISA	Microarchitecture	Cores	Frq (GHz)	Microarchitecture	Frq (MHz)	Performance (GFLOPS)	Type	Bus width (bit)	Bandwidth (GB/s)	Nav	Cellular	WLAN	PAN	Sampling availability	Devices using
Kirin 620 (Hi6220)	28 nm	ARMv8-A	Cortex-A53	8	1.2	Mali-450 MP4	500	32	LPDDR3	32-bit (1x32-bit Single-channel)	6.4 (800 MHz)	—N/a	Dual SIM LTE Cat.4 (150 Mbit/s)	—N/a	—N/a	Q1 2015	List: Huawei P8 Lite, Honor 4X, Honor 4C, Huawei G Play Mini, Honor Holly 3, Y6ll, 96Boards HiKey

=== Kirin 650, 655, 658, 659 ===
Model number	Fab	CPU				GPU			Memory technology			Nav	Wireless			Sampling availability	Devices using
Model number	Fab	ISA	μarch	Cores	Freq (GHz)	μarch	Freq (MHz)	Performance (GFLOPS)	Type	Bus width (bit)	Bandwidth (GB/s)	Nav	Cellular	WLAN	PAN	Sampling availability	Devices using
Kirin 650 (Hi6250)	16 nm FinFET+	ARM v8-A	Cortex-A53; Cortex-A53	4+4	2.0 (4x A53); 1.7 (4x A53)	Mali-T830 MP2	900	57.6	LPDDR3	64-bit (2x32-bit Dual-channel)	14.9 (933 MHz)	A-GPS, Glonass	Dual SIM LTE Cat.6 (300 Mbit/s)	WIFI 4 (802.11n)	Bluetooth 4.1	Q2 2016	List: Huawei P9 Lite; Honor 5C
Kirin 655	16 nm FinFET+	ARM v8-A	Cortex-A53; Cortex-A53	4+4	2.12 (4x A53); 1.7 (4x A53)	Mali-T830 MP2	900	57.6	LPDDR3	64-bit (2x32-bit Dual-channel)		A-GPS, Glonass	Dual SIM LTE Cat.6 (300 Mbit/s)	WIFI 4 (802.11n)	Bluetooth 4.1	Q4 2016	List: Huawei Mate9 Lite, Huawei Honor 6X, P8 Lite (2017), Honor 8 Lite
Kirin 658	16 nm FinFET+	ARM v8-A	Cortex-A53; Cortex-A53	4+4	2.35 (4x A53); 1.7 (4x A53)	Mali-T830 MP2	900	57.6	LPDDR3	64-bit (2x32-bit Dual-channel)		A-GPS, Glonass	Dual SIM LTE Cat.6 (300 Mbit/s)	WIFI 5 (802.11ac)	Bluetooth 4.1	Q2 2017	List: P10 Lite

=== Kirin 710 ===
Model Number	Fab	CPU				GPU			Memory Technology			Nav	Wireless			Sampling availability	Devices using
Model Number	Fab	ISA	Microarchitecture	Cores	Frq (GHz)	Microarchitecture	Frq (MHz)	Performance (GFLOPS)	Type	Bus width (bit)	Bandwidth (GB/s)	Nav	Cellular	WLAN	PAN	Sampling availability	Devices using
Kirin 710 (Hi6260)	TSMC 12 nm FinFET	ARMv8-A	Cortex-A73; Cortex-A53	4+4	2.2 (A73); 1.7 (A53)	Mali-G51 MP4	1000	64	LPDDR3; LPDDR4	32-bit		A-GPS, GLONASS	Dual SIM LTE Cat.12 (600 Mbit/s)	WIFI 4 (802.11 b/g/n)	Bluetooth v4.2	Q3 2018	List: Huawei Nova 3i, Honor 10 Lite, Huawei P Smart+, Huawei P Smart 2019, Huawei Mate 20 Lite, Honor 8X, Huawei Y9 (2019), Huawei P30 Lite，Huawei Y9 Prime 2019, Huawei Y9s, Huawei Mate 20 Lite, Honor 20i
Kirin 710F	TSMC 12 nm FinFET	ARMv8-A	Cortex-A73; Cortex-A53	4+4	2.2 (A73); 1.7 (A53)	Mali-G51 MP4	1000	64	LPDDR3; LPDDR4	32-bit		A-GPS, GLONASS	Dual SIM LTE Cat.12 (600 Mbit/s)	WIFI 4 (802.11 b/g/n)	Bluetooth v4.2	Q4 2019	List: Honor 9X, Huawei P40 lite E, Huawei Y8p
Kirin 710A	SMIC 14 nm FinFET	ARMv8-A	Cortex-A73; Cortex-A53	4+4	2.0 (A73); 1.7 (A53)	Mali-G51 MP4	1000	64	LPDDR3; LPDDR4	32-bit		A-GPS, GLONASS	Dual SIM LTE Cat.12 (600 Mbit/s)	WIFI 4 (802.11 b/g/n)	Bluetooth v4.2	Q2 2020	List: Honor Play 4T, Huawei P smart 2021, Huawei Nova Y70, Huawei Nova Y71, Huawei Nova Y72, Huawei MatePad SE 11

=== Kirin 810 and 820 ===
- DaVinci NPU based on Tensor Arithmetic Unit
- Kirin 820 supported 5G NSA & SA

Model number	Fab	CPU				GPU			Memory technology			Nav	Wireless			Sampling availability	Devices using
Model number	Fab	ISA	μarch	Cores	Freq (GHz)	μarch	Freq (MHz)	Performance (GFLOPS)	Type	Bus width (bit)	Band width (GB/s)	Nav	Cellular	WLAN	PAN	Sampling availability	Devices using
Kirin 810 (Hi6280)	7 nm FinFET	ARM v8.2-A	Cortex-A76; Cortex-A55 (big.LITTLE)	2+6	2.27 (2x A76); 1.90 (6x A55)	Mali-G52 MP6	820	157.4	LPDDR4X	64-bit (4x16-bit Quad-channel)	34.1 (2133 MHz)	A-GPS, Glonass, BDS	Dual SIM LTE Cat.12 (600 Mbit/s)	WIFI 5 (802.11ac)	Bluetooth 5.0	Q2 2019	List: Huawei Nova 5; Huawei Honor 9x; Huawei Honor 9x Pro; Huawei Mate 30 Lite; Huawei P40 Lite; Huawei Nova 7i; Huawei nova 6 SE; Huawei P smart Pro 2019; Huawei nova 5z; Huawei nova 5i Pro; Huawei Honor 20S; Huawei MatePad 10.4
Kirin 820 5G (Hi6290L V100)	7 nm FinFET	ARM v8.2-A	Cortex-A76; Cortex-A55 (big.LITTLE)	(1+3)+4	2.36 (1x A76 H); 2.22 (3x A76 L); 1.84 (4x A55)	Mali-G57 MP6			LPDDR4X	64-bit (4x16-bit Quad-channel)	34.1 (2133 MHz)	A-GPS, Glonass, BDS	Balong 5000 (Sub-6 GHz Only; NSA & SA)			Q1 2020	List: Honor 30S; Honor X10 5G
Kirin 820E 5G	7 nm FinFET	ARM v8.2-A	Cortex-A76; Cortex-A55 (big.LITTLE)	3+3	2.22 (3x A76 L); 1.84 (3x A55)	Mali-G57 MP6			LPDDR4X	64-bit (4x16-bit Quad-channel)	34.1 (2133 MHz)	A-GPS, Glonass, BDS	Balong 5000 (Sub-6 GHz Only; NSA & SA)			Q1 2021	

=== Kirin 910 and 910T ===
Model Number	Fab	CPU				GPU			Memory Technology			Nav	Wireless			Sampling availability	Devices using
Model Number	Fab	ISA	Microarchitecture	Cores	Frq (GHz)	Microarchitecture	Frq (MHz)	Performance (GFLOPS)	Type	Bus width (bit)	Bandwidth (GB/s)	Nav	Cellular	WLAN	PAN	Sampling availability	Devices using
Kirin 910 (Hi6620)	28 nm HPM	ARMv7	Cortex-A9	4	1.6	Mali-450 MP4	533	32	LPDDR3	32-bit (1x32-bit Single-channel)	6.4 (800 MHz)	—N/a	LTE Cat.4	—N/a	—N/a	H1 2014	List: HP Slate 7 VoiceTab Ultra, Huawei MediaPad X1, Huawei P6 S, Huawei MediaPad M1, Huawei Honor 3C 4G
Kirin 910T	28 nm HPM	ARMv7	Cortex-A9	4	1.8	Mali-450 MP4	700	41.8	LPDDR3	32-bit (1x32-bit Single-channel)	6.4 (800 MHz)	—N/a	LTE Cat.4	—N/a	—N/a	H1 2014	List: Huawei Ascend P7

=== Kirin 920, 925 and 928 ===
• The Kirin 920 SoC also contains an image processor that supports up to 32-megapixel

Model Number	Fab	CPU				GPU			Memory Technology			Nav	Wireless			Sampling availability	Devices using
Model Number	Fab	ISA	Microarchitecture	Cores	Frq (GHz)	Microarchitecture	Frq (MHz)	Performance (GFLOPS)	Type	Bus width (bit)	Bandwidth (GB/s)	Nav	Cellular	WLAN	PAN	Sampling availability	Devices using
Kirin 920	28 nm HPM	ARMv7	Cortex-A15; Cortex-A7 big.LITTLE	4+4	1.7 (A15); 1.3 (A7)	Mali-T628 MP4	600	76.8	LPDDR3	64-bit (2x32-bit Dual-channel)	12.8 (800 MHz)	—N/a	LTE Cat.6 (300 Mbit/s)	—N/a	—N/a	H2 2014	List: Huawei Honor 6
Kirin 925 (Hi3630)	28 nm HPM	ARMv7	Cortex-A15; Cortex-A7 big.LITTLE	4+4	1.8 (A15); 1.3 (A7)	Mali-T628 MP4	600	76.8	LPDDR3	64-bit (2x32-bit Dual-channel)	12.8 (800 MHz)	—N/a	LTE Cat.6 (300 Mbit/s)	—N/a	—N/a	Q3 2014	List: Huawei Ascend Mate 7; Huawei Honor 6 Plus
Kirin 928	28 nm HPM	ARMv7	Cortex-A15; Cortex-A7 big.LITTLE	4+4	2.0 (A15); 1.3 (A7)	Mali-T628 MP4	—N/a	—N/a	LPDDR3	64-bit (2x32-bit Dual-channel)	12.8 (800 MHz)	—N/a	LTE Cat.6 (300 Mbit/s)	—N/a	—N/a		List: Huawei Honor6 extreme Edition

=== Kirin 930 and 935 ===
• supports – SD 3.0 (UHS-I) / eMMC 4.51 / Dual-band a/b/g/n Wi-Fi / Bluetooth 4.0 Low Energy / USB 2.0 / 32 MP ISP / 1080p video encode

Model Number	Fab	CPU				GPU			Memory Technology			Nav	Wireless			Sampling availability	Devices using
Model Number	Fab	ISA	Microarchitecture	Cores	Frq (GHz)	Microarchitecture	Frq (MHz)	Performance (GFLOPS)	Type	Bus width (bit)	Bandwidth (GB/s)	Nav	Cellular	WLAN	PAN	Sampling availability	Devices using
Kirin 930 (Hi3635)	28 nm HPC	ARMv8-A	Cortex-A53; Cortex-A53	4+4	2.0 (A53); 1.5 (A53)	Mali-T628 MP4	600	76.8	LPDDR3	64-bit (2x32-bit Dual-channel)	12.8 (800 MHz)	—N/a	Dual SIM LTE Cat.6 (DL:300 Mbit/s UP:50 Mbit/s)	—N/a	—N/a	Q1 2015	List: Huawei MediaPad X2, Huawei P8, Huawei MediaPad M2,
Kirin 935	28 nm HPC	ARMv8-A	Cortex-A53; Cortex-A53	4+4	2.2 (A53); 1.5 (A53)	Mali-T628 MP4	680	87	LPDDR3	64-bit (2x32-bit Dual-channel)	12.8 (800 MHz)	—N/a	Dual SIM LTE Cat.6 (DL:300 Mbit/s UP:50 Mbit/s)	—N/a	—N/a	Q1 2015	List: Huawei P8 MAX, Honor 7, Huawei Mate S

=== Kirin 950 and 955 ===
• supports – SD 4.1 (UHS-II) / UFS 2.0 / eMMC 5.1 / MU-MIMO 802.11ac Wi-Fi / Bluetooth 4.2 Smart / USB 3.0 / NFS / Dual ISP (42 MP) / Native 10-bit 4K video encode / i5 coprocessor / Tensilica HiFi 4 DSP

Model Number	Fab	CPU				GPU			Memory Technology			Nav	Wireless			Sampling availability	Devices using
Model Number	Fab	ISA	Microarchitecture	Cores	Frq (GHz)	Microarchitecture	Frq (MHz)	Performance (GFLOPS)	Type	Bus width (bit)	Bandwidth (GB/s)	Nav	Cellular	WLAN	PAN	Sampling availability	Devices using
Kirin 950 (Hi3650)	TSMC 16 nm FinFET+	ARMv8-A	Cortex-A72; Cortex-A53 big.LITTLE	4+4	2.3 (A72); 1.8 (A53)	Mali-T880 MP4	900	151.2	LPDDR4	64-bit (2x32-bit Dual-channel)	25.6 (1600 MHz)	—N/a	Dual SIM LTE Cat.6	—N/a	—N/a	Q4 2015	List: Huawei Mate 8, Huawei Honor V8 32 GB, Huawei Honor 8, Huawei Honor Magic, Huawei MediaPad M3 (BTV-W09)
Kirin 955	TSMC 16 nm FinFET+	ARMv8-A	Cortex-A72; Cortex-A53 big.LITTLE	4+4	2.5 (A72); 1.8 (A53)	Mali-T880 MP4	900	151.2	LPDDR3 (3 GB); LPDDR4 (4 GB)	64-bit (2x32-bit Dual-channel)	25.6 (1600 MHz)	—N/a	Dual SIM LTE Cat.6	—N/a	—N/a	Q2 2016	List: Huawei P9, Huawei P9 Plus, Honor Note 8, Honor V8 64 GB

=== Kirin 960 ===
- Interconnect: ARM CCI-550, Storage: UFS 2.1, eMMC 5.1, Sensor Hub: i6

Model Number	Fab	CPU				GPU			Memory Technology			Nav	Wireless			Sampling availability	Devices using
Model Number	Fab	ISA	Microarchitecture	Cores	Frq (GHz)	Microarchitecture	Frq (MHz)	Performance (GFLOPS)	Type	Bus width (bit)	Bandwidth (GB/s)	Nav	Cellular	WLAN	PAN	Sampling availability	Devices using
Kirin 960 (Hi3660)	TSMC 16 nm FFC	ARMv8-A	Cortex-A73; Cortex-A53 big.LITTLE	4+4	2.36 (A73); 1.84 (A53)	Mali-G71 MP8	1037	199.1	LPDDR4	64-bit (2x32-bit Dual-channel)	25.6 (1600 MHz)	—N/a	Dual SIM LTE Cat.12 LTE 4x CA, 4x4 MIMO	—N/a	—N/a	Q4 2016	List: Huawei Mate 9, Huawei Mate 9 Porsche Design, Huawei Mate 9 Pro, Huawei P10, Huawei P10 Plus, Huawei Nova 2s, Honor 8 Pro (Honor V9), Honor 9, Huawei MediaPad M5

=== Kirin 970 ===
- Interconnect: ARM CCI-550, Storage: UFS 2.1, Sensor Hub: i7
- Cadence Tensilica Vision P6 DSP.
- NPU made in collaboration with Cambricon Technologies. 1.92T FP16 OPS.

Model Number	Fab	CPU				GPU			Memory Technology			Nav	Wireless			Sampling availability	Devices using
Model Number	Fab	ISA	Microarchitecture	Cores	Frq (GHz)	Microarchitecture	Frq (MHz)	Performance (GFLOPS)	Type	Bus width (bit)	Bandwidth (GB/s)	Nav	Cellular	WLAN	PAN	Sampling availability	Devices using
Kirin 970 (Hi3670)	TSMC 10 nm FinFET+	ARMv8-A	Cortex-A73; Cortex-A53 big.LITTLE	4+4	2.36 (A73); 1.84 (A53)	Mali-G72 MP12	746	214.8	LPDDR4X	64-bit (4x16-bit Quad-channel)	29.8 (1866 MHz)	Galileo	Dual SIM LTE Cat.18 LTE 5x CA, No 4x4 MIMO	—N/a	—N/a	Q4 2017	List: Huawei Nova 3; Huawei P20; Huawei P20 Pro; Huawei Mate 10; Huawei Mate 10 Pro; Huawei Mate 10 Porsche Design; Huawei Mate RS Porsche Design; Honor V10/ Honor View 10; Honor 10; Honor Note 10; Honor Play

=== Kirin 980 and Kirin 985 5G/4G ===
Kirin 980 is HiSilicon's first SoC based on 7 nm FinFET technology.

- Interconnect: ARM Mali G76-MP10, Storage: UFS 2.1, Sensor Hub: i8
- Dual NPU made in collaboration with Cambricon Technologies.

Kirin 985 5G is the second Hisilicon's 5G SoC based on 7 nm FinFET Technology.

- Interconnect: ARM Mali-G77 MP8, Storage UFS 3.0
- Big-Tiny Da Vinci NPU: 1x Da Vinci Lite + 1x Da Vinci Tiny

Model number	Fab	CPU				GPU			Memory technology			Nav	Wireless			Sampling availability	Devices using
Model number	Fab	ISA	μarch	Cores	Freq (GHz)	μarch	Freq (MHz)	Performance (GFLOPS)	Type	Bus width (bit)	Band width (GB/s)	Nav	Cellular	WLAN	PAN	Sampling availability	Devices using
Kirin 980	TSMC 7 nm FinFET	ARM v8.2-A	Cortex-A76; Cortex-A55 (big.LITTLE)	(2+2)+4	2.6 (A76 H); 1.92 (A76 L); 1.8 (A55)	Mali-G76 MP10	720	345.6	LPDDR4X	64-bit (4x16-bit Quad-channel)	34.1 (2133 MHz)	Galileo	Dual SIM LTE Cat.21 LTE 5x CA, No 4x4 MIMO	—N/a	—N/a	Q4 2018	List: Huawei Mate 20; Huawei Mate 20 Pro; Huawei Mate 20 RS Porsche Design; Huawei Mate 20 X; Honor Magic 2; Honor View 20/V20; Honor 20; Honor 20 Pro; Huawei P30; Huawei P30 Pro; Huawei Nova 5 Pro; Huawei MediaPad M6; Huawei Nova 5T
Kirin 985 5G/4G (Hi6290V110)	TSMC 7 nm FinFET	ARM v8.2-A	Cortex-A76; Cortex-A55 (big.LITTLE)	(1+3)+4	2.58 (A76 H); 2.40 (A76 L); 1.84 (A55)	Mali-G77 MP8	700	358.4	LPDDR4X	64-bit (4x16-bit Quad-channel)	34.1 (2133 MHz)	Galileo	Balong 5000 (Sub-6 GHz only; NSA & SA), 4G version available	—N/a	—N/a	Q2 2020	List: Honor 30; Honor V6; Huawei nova 7 5G; Huawei nova 7 Pro 5G; Huawei nova 8 5G; Huawei nova 8 Pro 5G

=== Kirin 990 4G, Kirin 990 5G and Kirin 990E 5G ===
Kirin 990 5G is HiSilicon's first 5G SoC based on N7 nm+ FinFET technology.

- Interconnect
  - Kirin 990 4G: ARM Mali-G76 MP16
  - Kirin 990 5G: ARM Mali-G76 MP16
  - Kirin 990E 5G: ARM Mali-G76 MP14
- Da Vinci NPU.
  - Kirin 990 4G: 1x Da Vinci Lite + 1x Da Vinci Tiny
  - Kirin 990 5G: 2x Da Vinci Lite + 1x Da Vinci Tiny
  - Kirin 990E 5G: 1x Da Vinci Lite + 1x Da Vinci Tiny
- Da Vinci Lite features 3D Cube Tensor Computing Engine (2048 FP16 MACs + 4096 INT8 MACs), Vector unit (1024bit INT8/FP16/FP32)
- Da Vinci Tiny features 3D Cube Tensor Computing Engine (256 FP16 MACs + 512 INT8 MACs), Vector unit (256bit INT8/FP16/FP32)

Model number	Fab	CPU				GPU			Memory technology			Nav	Wireless			Sampling availability	Devices using
Model number	Fab	ISA	μarch	Cores	Freq (GHz)	μarch	Freq (MHz)	Performance (GFLOPS)	Type	Bus width (bit)	Band width (GB/s)	Nav	Cellular	WLAN	PAN	Sampling availability	Devices using
Kirin 990 4G	TSMC 7 nm FinFET (DUV)	ARM v8.2-A	Cortex-A76; Cortex-A55 (big.LITTLE)	(2+2)+4	2.86 (A76 H); 2.09 (A76 L); 1.86 (A55)	Mali-G76 MP16	600	460.8	LPDDR4X	64-bit (4x16-bit Quad-channel)	34.1 (2133 MHz)	Beidou, Galileo, Glonass	Balong 765 (LTE Cat.19)	—N/a	—N/a	Q4 2019	List: Huawei Mate 30; Huawei Mate 30 Pro; Huawei P40 4G; Huawei Nova 6; Huawei Nova 6 5G; Honor V30; Honor Play4 Pro; Huawei MatePad Pro (WiFi/4G) (2019–2020)
Kirin 990 5G	TSMC 7 nm+ FinFET (EUV)	ARM v8.2-A	Cortex-A76; Cortex-A55 (big.LITTLE)	(2+2)+4	2.86 (A76 H); 2.36 (A76 L); 1.95 (A55)	Mali-G76 MP16	600	460.8	LPDDR4X	64-bit (4x16-bit Quad-channel)	34.1 (2133 MHz)	Beidou, Galileo, Glonass	Balong 5000 (Sub-6-GHz only; NSA & SA)	—N/a	—N/a	Q4 2019	List: Huawei Mate 30 5G; Huawei Mate 30 Pro 5G; Huawei Mate 30 RS Porche Design; Huawei P40; Huawei P40 Pro; Huawei P40 Pro+; Honor V30 Pro; Huawei MatePad Pro 5G (2020); Honor 30 Pro; Honor 30 Pro+
Kirin 990E 5G	TSMC 7 nm+ FinFET (EUV)	ARM v8.2-A	Cortex-A76; Cortex-A55 (big.LITTLE)	(2+2)+4	2.86 (A76 H); 2.36 (A76 L); 1.95 (A55)	Mali-G76 MP14	600	403.2	LPDDR4X	64-bit (4x16-bit Quad-channel)	34.1 (2133 MHz)	Beidou, Galileo, Glonass	Balong 5000 (Sub-6-GHz only; NSA & SA)	—N/a	—N/a	Q4 2020	List: Huawei Mate 30E Pro 5G; Huawei Mate 40E (4G/5G)

=== Kirin 8000 ===
HiSilicon Kirin 8000 is a mid-range Kirin 8 series chip not officially announced, however, it was released along with the announcement of Huawei nova 12.

Model number	Fab	CPU				GPU			Memory technology			Nav	Wireless			Sampling availability	Devices using
Model number	Fab	ISA	μarch	Cores	Freq (GHz)	μarch	Freq (MHz)	Performance (GFLOPS)	Type	Bus width (bit)	Band width (GB/s)	Nav	Cellular	WLAN	PAN	Sampling availability	Devices using
Kirin 8000 (Hi6290V110)	SMIC N+2; 7 nm FinFET	ARM v8.2-A	Cortex-A77; Cortex-A55 (big.LITTLE)	1+3+4	2.40 (1x A77 H); 2.19 (3x A77 L); 1.84 (4x A55)	Mali-G610; MP4	864	442.4	LPDDR4X; LPDDR5	64-bit (4x16-bit Quad-channel)	34.1 (2133 MHz); 51.2 (3200 MHz)	GPS, A-GPS, Glonass, BeiDou, Galileo, QZSS	Balong modem	Wi-Fi 6 (802.11ax)	Bluetooth 5.2	Q1 2024	List: Huawei Nova 12; Huawei Nova 12 Pro; Huawei Nova Flip
Kirin T80 (Hi6290V110)	SMIC N+2; 7 nm FinFET	ARM v8.2-A	Cortex-A77; Cortex-A55 (big.LITTLE)	1+3+4	2.40 (1x A77 H); 2.19 (3x A77 L); 1.84 (4x A55)	Mali-G610; MP4	864	442.4	LPDDR4X; LPDDR5	64-bit (4x16-bit Quad-channel)	34.1 (2133 MHz); 51.2 (3200 MHz)	GPS, A-GPS, Glonass, BeiDou, Galileo, QZSS	Balong modem	Wi-Fi 6 (802.11ax)	Bluetooth 5.2	Q1 2025	Huawei MatePad 11.5 PaperMatte (2025)
Kirin 8020	SMIC N+2; 7 nm FinFET	ARM v8.2-A	HiSilicon Taishan	1+3+4	2.22 (1x Taishan Big); 2.05 (3x Taishan Mid); 1.31 (4x Taishan Small)	Maleoon 920C	840	860.2	LPDDR5X	64-bit (4x16-bit Quad-channel)	68.2 (4266 MHz)	GPS, A-GPS, Glonass, BeiDou, Galileo, QZSS	Balong modem	Wi-Fi 7 (802.11be)	Bluetooth 5.2	Q2 2025	List: Huawei Nova 14 Pro; Huawei Nova 14 Ultra; Huawei Nova 15
Kirin T82	SMIC N+2; 7 nm FinFET	ARM v8.2-A	HiSilicon Taishan	1+3+4	2.22 (1x Taishan Big); 2.05 (3x Taishan Mid); 1.31 (4x Taishan Small)	Maleoon 920C	840	860.2	LPDDR5X	64-bit (4x16-bit Quad-channel)	68.2 (4266 MHz)	GPS, A-GPS, Glonass, BeiDou, Galileo, QZSS	Balong modem	Wi-Fi 7 (802.11be)	Bluetooth 5.2	Q4 2025	Huawei MatePad 11.5 (2026)

=== Kirin 9000 5G/4G and Kirin 9000E, Kirin 9000L ===
Kirin 9000 is HiSilicon's first SoC based on 5 nm+ FinFET (EUV) TSMC technology (N5 node) and the first 5 nm SoC to be launched on the international market. This octa-core system on a chip is based on the 9th Gen of the HiSilicon Kirin series and is equipped with 15.3 billion transistors in a 1+3+4 core configuration: 4 Arm Cortex-A77 CPU (1x 3.13 GHz and 3x 2.54 GHz), 4 Arm Cortex-A55 (4x 2.05 GHz) and a 24-core Mali-G78 GPU (22-core in the Kirin 9000E version) The Kirin 9000L uses a 1+2+3 core configuration: 3 Arm Cortex-A77 (1x 3.13 GHz and 2x 2.54 GHz), 3 Arm Cortex-A55 (3x 2.05 GHz) and a 22-core Mali-G78 GPU with Kirin Gaming+ 3.0 implementation.

The integrated quad pipeline NPU (Dual Big Core + 1 Tiny Core configuration) is equipped with the Kirin ISP 6.0 to support advanced computational photography. The Huawei Da Vinci Architecture 2.0 for AI supports 2x Ascend Lite + 1x Ascend Tiny (only 1 Lite in 9000E/L). The system cache is 8 MB and the SoC works with the new LPDDR5/4X memories (made by Samsung in the Huawei Mate 40 series). Due to the integrated 3rd generation 5G proprietary modem "Balong 5000", Kirin 9000 supports 2G, 3G, 4G and 5G SA & NSA Sub-6 GHz connectivity. The SoC's TDP is 6W.

The 2021 4G version of the Kirin 9000 has the Balong modem limited via software to comply with the ban imposed on Huawei by the US government for non-chinese 5G technologies. The Kirin 9006C is a rebranded variant of the Kirin 9000E for the Huawei Qingyun L420 and L540 laptops.

- GPU
  - Kirin 9000L: ARM Mali-G78 MP22
  - Kirin 9000E: ARM Mali-G78 MP22
  - Kirin 9000: ARM Mali-G78 MP24
- Da Vinci NPU architecture 2.0
  - Kirin 9000L: 1x Big Core + 1x Tiny Core
  - Kirin 9000E: 1x Big Core + 1x Tiny Core
  - Kirin 9000: 2x Big Cores + 1x Tiny Core

Model number	Fab	CPU				GPU			Memory technology			Nav	Wireless			Sampling availability	Devices using
Model number	Fab	ISA	μarch	Cores	Freq (GHz)	μarch	Freq (MHz)	Performance (GFLOPS)	Type	Bus width (bit)	Band width (GB/s)	Nav	Cellular	WLAN	PAN	Sampling availability	Devices using
Kirin 9000L	TSMC 5 nm+ FinFET (EUV)	ARM v8.2-A	Cortex-A77; Cortex-A55 (big.LITTLE)	(1+2)+3	3.13 (A77 H); 2.54 (A77 L); 2.05 (A55)	Mali-G78 MP22	759	1068.7	LPDDR4X; LPDDR5	64-bit (4x16-bit); Quad-channel	34.1 (2133 MHz); 44 (2750 MHz)	Beidou, Galileo, Glonass	Balong 5000 (Sub-6-GHz only; NSA & SA)	Wi-Fi 6		Q4 2020	Huawei Mate 40E Pro
Kirin 9000E	TSMC 5 nm+ FinFET (EUV)	ARM v8.2-A	Cortex-A77; Cortex-A55 (big.LITTLE)	(1+3)+4	3.13 (A77 H); 2.54 (A77 L); 2.05 (A55)	Mali-G78 MP22	759	1068.7	LPDDR4X; LPDDR5	64-bit (4x16-bit); Quad-channel	34.1 (2133 MHz); 44 (2750 MHz)	Beidou, Galileo, Glonass	Balong 5000 (Sub-6-GHz only; NSA & SA); 4G version available	—N/a	—N/a	Q4 2020	List: Huawei Mate 40; Huawei MatePad Pro 12.6
Kirin 9000 (Hi36A0V101)	TSMC 5 nm+ FinFET (EUV)	ARM v8.2-A	Cortex-A77; Cortex-A55 (big.LITTLE)	(1+3)+4	3.13 (A77 H); 2.54 (A77 L); 2.05 (A55)	Mali-G78 MP24	759	1165.8	LPDDR4X; LPDDR5	64-bit (4x16-bit); Quad-channel	34.1 (2133 MHz); 44 (2750 MHz)	Beidou, Galileo, Glonass	Balong 5000 (Sub-6-GHz only; NSA & SA); 4G version available	Wi-Fi 6		Q4 2020	List: Huawei Mate 40 Pro; Huawei Mate 40 Pro+; Huawei Mate 40 RS Porsche Design; Huawei P50 Pro; Huawei Mate X2

=== Kirin 9000S, Kirin 90x0 series ===
The Kirin 9000S, Kirin 9000S1, and Kirin 9010 of the Kirin 9000 Hi36A0 family were the first HiSilicon-developed SoCs manufactured in high volumes in mainland China in 2023 by SMIC. The SoC had its debut with the Huawei Mate 60 in late 2023 with the Kirin 9000S alongside overclocked enhancements of the Kirin 9000S1 and Kirin 9010 with the Huawei Pura 70 series in early 2024. According to Tom's Hardware, the Taishan V120 core, developed by HiSilicon, was roughly on par with AMD's Zen 3 cores from late 2020. Four of these cores were used in the 9000 series alongside four efficiency-focused Arm Cortex-A510 cores. The SoCs are based on SMIC's 7nm technology node, referred to as "N+2". It also includes 1 Da Vinci "big" NPU core and 1 Da Vinci "small" NPU core. Kirin 9000W, a Wi-Fi only SoC for the Huawei MatePad Pro 13.2 Wi-Fi only model, debuted in global markets in Q1 2024. The Kirin 9010 and Kirin 9000S1 debuted in Q2 2024, using a modified 2+6+4 core configuration with a new large Taishan core with the same configurations of medium and small cores from the Kirin 9000S with faster enhancements over the Kirin 9000S.

The Kirin 9030 and Kirin 9030 Pro were announced on 25 November 2025 with the Huawei Mate 80 series. Both use the same die, estimated at roughly 15 billion transistors on a denser node than the Kirin 9020: the Kirin 9030 Pro is configured as 1+4+4 with simultaneous multithreading on the prime and middle cores (9 cores, 14 threads), while the Kirin 9030 has one middle core and one GPU compute unit disabled (1+3+4, 8 cores, 12 threads) at marginally lower clocks. The middle and little cores are structurally close to those of the Kirin 9020, with changes concentrated in the prime core — a retuned pipeline, larger register files and a wider out-of-order execution window — and in the caches, where prime-core L2 doubled to 2 MB, the L3 shared by the five performance cores grew from 10 to 12 MB and the system-level cache from 8 to 12 MB. The Maleoon 935 GPU uses six compute units totalling 2,160 ALUs, against four units and 1,024 ALUs in the Maleoon 920, and is the first Maleoon generation with hardware-accelerated ray tracing; the Da Vinci NPU moved from one big and one small core to one big and two small, the ISP gained a dual-core controller and a third pipeline, and the Balong modem block shrank by about 31% in area. Measured single-core performance improved some 13% over the Kirin 9020 and 3DMark Steel Nomad Light by 76%, placing multi-core power efficiency between the Snapdragon 8 Gen 2 and 8 Gen 3.

The Kirin 9050 Pro was announced on 7 September 2026 with the Huawei Mate XT 2 and is the first Kirin to use Huawei's LogicFolding packaging, presented as the first commercial application of the company's "Tau (τ) scaling law". Unlike conventional 3D stacking such as AMD's 3D V-Cache or Intel's Foveros, which stack cache or largely self-contained dies, LogicFolding splits logic inside the core pipeline across two vertically stacked active layers joined by hybrid bonding, shortening critical timing paths. Huawei states that transistor density rose from about 155 to 238 million per square millimetre over the Kirin 9030 Pro, giving a 42% overall performance gain and power reductions of 41%, 58% and 66% on the CPU performance core, GPU and NPU at matched performance. The CPU is a four-cluster 1+2+4+2 design with SMT on all but the small cores, for 9 cores and 16 threads; the prime core has 2 MB of L2 and the two small cores share 2 MB, the prime and two performance cores share 8 MB of L3 with a further 8 MB for the four efficiency cores, alongside 12 MB of system-level cache. The Maleoon 955 GPU retains six compute units with a higher ALU count per unit, and the NPU is rated at 70 TOPS (INT8), which Huawei says suffices to run a 30-billion-parameter mixture of experts multimodal model on-device.

Model number	Fab	CPU					GPU			Memory technology			Nav	Wireless			Sampling availability	Devices using
Model number	Fab	ISA	μarch	Cores (total)	Threads (total)	Freq (GHz)	μarch	Freq (MHz)	Performance (GFLOPS)	Type	Bus width (bit)	Band width (GB/s)	Nav	Cellular	WLAN	PAN	Sampling availability	Devices using
Kirin 9000S (Hi36A0V120)	SMIC N+2; 7nm FinFET	ARMv8.x	HiSilicon; Taishan, Cortex-A510	1+3+4 (8)	2+6+4 (12)	2.62 GHz (TaishanV120); 2.15 GHz (TaishanV120); 1.53 GHz (Cortex-A510)	HiSilicon; Maleoon 910	750	1536	LPDDR5	64-bit (4x16-bit Quad- channel)	44 (2750 MHz)	Beidou, Galileo, GLONASS	Balong 5000 5G 3GPP Rel. 15 (Sub-6-GHz)	Wi-Fi 6 (external module)	Bluetooth 5.2, NearLink, NFC	Q3 2023	List: Huawei Mate 60; Huawei Mate 60 Pro; Huawei Mate 60 Pro+; Huawei Mate 60 RS Ultimate Design; Huawei Mate X5
Kirin 9000S1 (Hi36A0V120)	SMIC N+2; 7nm FinFET	ARMv8.x	HiSilicon; Taishan, Cortex-A510	1+3+4 (8)	2+6+4 (12)	2.49 GHz (TaishanV120); 2.15 GHz (TaishanV120); 1.53 GHz (Cortex-A510)	HiSilicon; Maleoon 910	750	1536	LPDDR5	64-bit (4x16-bit Quad- channel)	44 (2750 MHz)	Beidou, Galileo, GLONASS	Balong 5000 5G 3GPP Rel. 15 (Sub-6-GHz)	Wi-Fi 6 (external module)	Bluetooth 5.2, NearLink, NFC	Q1 2024	Huawei Pura 70
Kirin 9000W (Hi36A0V120)	SMIC N+2; 7nm FinFET	ARMv8.x	HiSilicon; Taishan, Cortex-A510	1+3+4 (8)	2+6+4 (12)	2.49 GHz (TaishanV120); 2.15 GHz (TaishanV120); 1.53 GHz (Cortex-A510)	HiSilicon; Maleoon 910	750	1536	LPDDR5	64-bit (4x16-bit Quad- channel)	44 (2750 MHz)	Beidou, Galileo, GLONASS	—N/a	Wi-Fi 6 (external module)	Bluetooth 5.2, NearLink, NFC	Q4 2023	List: Huawei MatePad Pro 13.2; Huawei MatePad Air (2024)
Kirin 9000WL (Hi36A0V120)	SMIC N+2; 7nm FinFET	ARMv8.x	HiSilicon; Taishan, Cortex-A510	1+3+4 (8)	2+6+4 (12)	2.49 GHz (TaishanV120); 2.15 GHz (TaishanV120); 1.53 GHz (Cortex-A510)	HiSilicon; Maleoon 910	750	1536	LPDDR5	64-bit (4x16-bit Quad- channel)	44 (2750 MHz)	Beidou, Galileo, GLONASS	—N/a	Wi-Fi 6 (external module)	Bluetooth 5.2, NearLink, NFC	Q2 2024	Huawei MatePad 11.5 S PaperMatte Edition
Kirin 9000WE (Hi36A0V120)	SMIC N+2; 7nm FinFET	ARMv8.x	HiSilicon; Taishan, Cortex-A510	1+3+4 (8)	2+6+4 (12)	2.49 GHz (TaishanV120); 2.15 GHz (TaishanV120); 1.53 GHz (Cortex-A510)	HiSilicon; Maleoon 910	750	1536	LPDDR5	64-bit (4x16-bit Quad- channel)	44 (2750 MHz)	Beidou, Galileo, GLONASS	—N/a	Wi-Fi 6 (external module)	Bluetooth 5.2, NearLink, NFC	Q2 2024	Huawei MatePad 11.5 S (12GB RAM)
Kirin T90 (Hi36A0V120)	SMIC N+2; 7nm FinFET	ARMv8.x	HiSilicon; Taishan, Cortex-A510	1+3+4 (8)	2+6+4 (12)	2.49 GHz (TaishanV120); 2.15 GHz (TaishanV120); 1.53 GHz (Cortex-A510)	HiSilicon; Maleoon 910	750	1536	LPDDR5	64-bit (4x16-bit Quad- channel)	44 (2750 MHz)	Beidou, Galileo, GLONASS	—N/a	Wi-Fi 6 (external module)	Bluetooth 5.2, NearLink, NFC	Q3 2024	Huawei MatePad Air (2024)
Kirin T90A (Hi36A0V120)	SMIC N+2; 7nm FinFET	ARMv8.x	HiSilicon; Taishan, Cortex-A510	1+3+4 (8)	2+6+4 (12)	2.49 GHz (TaishanV120); 2.15 GHz (TaishanV120); 1.53 GHz (Cortex-A510)	HiSilicon; Maleoon 910	750	1536	LPDDR5	64-bit (4x16-bit Quad- channel)	44 (2750 MHz)	Beidou, Galileo, GLONASS	—N/a	Wi-Fi 6 (external module)	Bluetooth 5.2, NearLink, NFC	Q3 2024	Huawei MatePad 12 X
Kirin 9000SL (Hi36A0V120)	SMIC N+2; 7nm FinFET	ARMv8.x	HiSilicon; Taishan, Cortex-A510	1+2+3 (6)	2+4+3 (9)	2.35 GHz (TaishanV120); 2.15 GHz (TaishanV120); 1.53 GHz (Cortex-A510)	HiSilicon; Maleoon 910	750	1536	LPDDR5	64-bit (4x16-bit Quad- channel)	44 (2750 MHz)	Beidou, Galileo, GLONASS	Balong 5000 5G 3GPP Rel. 15 (Sub-6-GHz)	Wi-Fi 6 (external module)	Bluetooth 5.2, NearLink, NFC	Q4 2023	Huawei Nova 12 Ultra
Kirin 9000WM (Hi36A0V120)	SMIC N+2; 7nm FinFET	ARMv8.x	HiSilicon; Taishan, Cortex-A510	1+2+3 (6)	2+4+3 (9)	2.35 GHz (TaishanV120); 2.15 GHz (TaishanV120); 1.53 GHz (Cortex-A510)	HiSilicon; Maleoon 910	750	1536	LPDDR5	64-bit (4x16-bit Quad- channel)	44 (2750 MHz)	Beidou, Galileo, GLONASS	—N/a	Wi-Fi 6 (external module)	Bluetooth 5.2, NearLink, NFC	Q2 2024	Huawei MatePad 11.5 S Smart Model
Kirin 9010 (Hi36A0V121)	SMIC N+2; 7nm FinFET	ARMv8.x	HiSilicon; Taishan, Cortex-A510	1+3+4 (8)	2+6+4 (12)	2.30 GHz (TaishanV121); 2.18 GHz (TaishanV120); 1.55 GHz (Cortex-A510)	HiSilicon; Maleoon 910	750	1536	LPDDR5	64-bit (4x16-bit Quad- channel)	51.2 (3200 MHz)	Beidou, Galileo, GLONASS	Balong 5000 5G 3GPP Rel. 15 (Sub-6-GHz)	Wi-Fi 6 (external module)	Bluetooth 5.2, NearLink, NFC	Q2 2024	List: Huawei Pura 70 Pro; Huawei Pura 70 Pro+; Huawei Pura 70 Ultra; Huawei Mate XT Ultimate; Huawei Mate 70
Kirin 9010E (Hi36A0V121)	SMIC N+2; 7nm FinFET	ARMv8.x	HiSilicon; Taishan, Cortex-A510	1+3+4 (8)	2+6+4 (12)	2.19 GHz (TaishanV121); 2.18 GHz (TaishanV120); 1.55 GHz (Cortex-A510)	HiSilicon; Maleoon 910	750	1536	LPDDR5	64-bit (4x16-bit Quad- channel)	51.2 (3200 MHz)	Beidou, Galileo, GLONASS	Balong 5000 5G 3GPP Rel. 15 (Sub-6-GHz)	Wi-Fi 6 (external module)	Bluetooth 5.2, NearLink, NFC	Q3 2024	Huawei Nova Flip
Kirin 9010A (Hi36A0V121)	SMIC N+2; 7nm FinFET	ARMv8.x	HiSilicon; Taishan, Cortex-A510	1+3+4 (8)	2+6+4 (12)	2.19 GHz (TaishanV121); 2.18 GHz (TaishanV120); 1.55 GHz (Cortex-A510)	HiSilicon; Maleoon 910	750	1536	LPDDR5	64-bit (4x16-bit Quad- channel)	51.2 (3200 MHz)	Beidou, Galileo, GLONASS		Wi-Fi 6 (external module)	Bluetooth 5.2, NearLink, NFC	Q3 2024	
Kirin 9010W (Hi36A0V121)	SMIC N+2; 7nm FinFET	ARMv8.x	HiSilicon; Taishan, Cortex-A510	1+3+4 (8)	2+6+4 (12)	2.19 GHz (TaishanV121); 2.18 GHz (TaishanV120); 1.55 GHz (Cortex-A510)	HiSilicon; Maleoon 910	750	1536	LPDDR5	64-bit (4x16-bit Quad- channel)	51.2 (3200 MHz)	Beidou, Galileo, GLONASS	—N/a	Wi-Fi 6 (external module)	Bluetooth 5.2, NearLink, NFC	Q3 2024	
Kirin T91 (Hi36A0V121)	SMIC N+2; 7nm FinFET	ARMv8.x	HiSilicon; Taishan, Cortex-A510	1+3+4 (8)	2+6+4 (12)	2.19 GHz (TaishanV121); 2.18 GHz (TaishanV120); 1.55 GHz (Cortex-A510)	HiSilicon; Maleoon 910	750	1536	LPDDR5	64-bit (4x16-bit Quad- channel)	51.2 (3200 MHz)	Beidou, Galileo, GLONASS	—N/a	Wi-Fi 6 (external module)	Bluetooth 5.2, NearLink, NFC	Q3 2024	Huawei MatePad Pro 12.2 (2024)
Kirin 9010L (Hi36A0V121)	SMIC N+2; 7nm FinFET	ARMv8.x	HiSilicon; Taishan, Cortex-A510	1+2+3 (6)	2+4+3 (9)	2.19 GHz (TaishanV121); 2.18 GHz (TaishanV120); 1.40 GHz (Cortex-A510)	HiSilicon; Maleoon 910	750	1536	LPDDR5	64-bit (4x16-bit Quad- channel)	51.2 (3200 MHz)	Beidou, Galileo, GLONASS	Balong 5000 5G 3GPP Rel. 15 (Sub-6-GHz)	Wi-Fi 6 (external module)	Bluetooth 5.2, NearLink, NFC	Q2 2024	Huawei Nova 12 Ultra Star Edition
Kirin 9020 (Hi36C0V110)	SMIC N+2; 7nm FinFET	ARMv8.x	HiSilicon; Taishan	1+3+4 (8)	2+6+4 (12)	2.50 GHz (TaishanV123); 2.15 GHz (TaishanV120); 1.60 GHz (Taishan-Little)	HiSilicon; Maleoon 920	840	1720	LPDDR5X	64-bit (4x16-bit Quad- channel)	68.2 (4266 MHz)	Beidou, Galileo, GLONASS	Balong 6000 5G 3GPP Rel. 17 (Sub-6-GHz)	Wi-Fi 6 (external module)	Bluetooth 5.2, NearLink, NFC	Q4 2024	List: Huawei Mate 70 Pro; Huawei Mate 70 Pro+; Huawei Mate 80
Kirin T92 (Hi36C0V110)	SMIC N+2; 7nm FinFET	ARMv8.x	HiSilicon; Taishan	1+3+4 (8)	2+6+4 (12)	2.50 GHz (TaishanV123); 2.15 GHz (TaishanV120); 1.60 GHz (Taishan-Little)	HiSilicon; Maleoon 920	840	1720	LPDDR5X	64-bit (4x16-bit Quad- channel)	68.2 (4266 MHz)	Beidou, Galileo, GLONASS	—N/a	Wi-Fi 6 (external module)	Bluetooth 5.2, NearLink, NFC	Q4 2024	Huawei MatePad Pro 13.2 (2025)
Kirin 9030S	SMIC N+2; 7nm FinFET	ARMv8.x	HiSilicon; Taishan	1+3+4 (8)	2+6+4 (12)	2.7 GHz (Taishan V124 Big); 2.15 GHz (Taishan V124 Mid); 1.62 GHz (Taishan V124 Little)	HiSilicon; Maleoon 935F		1433	LPDDR5X	64-bit (4x16-bit Quad- channel)		Beidou, Galileo, GLONASS					List: Huawei Pura 90 Pro; Huawei Pura 90 Pro Max
Kirin 9030	SMIC N+3; 5nm FinFET	ARMv8.x	HiSilicon; Taishan	1+3+4 (8)	2+6+4 (12)	2.69 GHz (Taishan V124 Big); 2.27 GHz (Taishan V124 Mid); 1.72 GHz (Taishan V124 Little)	HiSilicon; Maleoon 935A (Note: The Kirin 9030 and Kirin 9030 Pro use the same physical die; the Kirin 9030 has one middle CPU core and one GPU compute unit disabled, the latter marketed as Maleoon 935A.)	933	2388 (Note: Theoretical FP32 peak. Teardown analysis credits the Maleoon 935 with six compute units and 2,160 ALUs and the Maleoon 955 with 2.2 TFLOPS FP32, both of which are inconsistent with the figures in this column.)	LPDDR5X	64-bit (4x16-bit Quad- channel)	76.8 (4800 MHz)	Beidou, Galileo, GLONASS	Balong 6000 5G 3GPP Rel. 17 (Sub-6-GHz)	Wi-Fi 7 (external module)	Bluetooth 6.0, NearLink, NFC	Q4 2025	Huawei Mate 80 Pro (12 GB)
Kirin 9030 Pro	SMIC N+3; 5nm FinFET	ARMv8.x	HiSilicon; Taishan	1+4+4 (9)	2+8+4 (14)	2.75 GHz (Taishan V124 Big); 2.27 GHz (Taishan V124 Mid); 1.72 GHz (Taishan V124 Little)	HiSilicon; Maleoon 935	933	2866	LPDDR5X	64-bit (4x16-bit Quad- channel)	76.8 (4800 MHz)	Beidou, Galileo, GLONASS	Balong 6000 5G 3GPP Rel. 17 (Sub-6-GHz)	Wi-Fi 7 (external module)	Bluetooth 6.0, NearLink, NFC	Q4 2025	List: Huawei Mate 80 Pro (16 GB); Huawei Mate 80 Pro Max; Huawei Mate 80 RS Ultimate; Huawei Mate 80 Pro Max Wind; Huawei Mate X7
Kirin 9050 Pro	SMIC 3nm equivalent FinFET (LogicFolding two-layer stacking with STCO)	ARMv8.x	HiSilicon; Taishan	1+2+4+2 (9)	2+4+8+2 (16)	3.1 GHz (Taishan V124 Big); 2.7 GHz (Taishan V124 Mid); 2.2 GHz (Taishan V124 Mid); 1.70 GHz (Taishan V124 Little)	HiSilicon; Maleoon 955	1050	3244	LPDDR5X	96-bit (4x24-bit Quad- channel) (Note: Specified for 4×24-bit LPDDR5 at 10,667 MT/s; engineering samples were tested with 4×16-bit LPDDR5X.)	128 (5333 MHz)	Beidou, Galileo, GLONASS	Balong 6000 5G 3GPP Rel. 17 (Sub-6-GHz)	Wi-Fi 7 (external module)	Bluetooth 6.0, NearLink, NFC	Q3 2026	Huawei Mate XT 2 Ultimate Design

== Smartphone modems ==
HiSilicon develops smartphone modems which are primarily used in its parent company Huawei's handheld and tablet devices.

=== Balong 700 ===
The Balong 700 supports LTE TDD/FDD. Its specs:

- 3GPP R8 protocol
- LTE TDD and FDD
- 4x2/2x2 SU-MIMO

=== Balong 710 ===
At MWC 2012, HiSilicon released the Balong 710. It is a multi-mode chipset supporting 3GPP Release 9 and LTE Category 4 at GTI (Global TD-LTE Initiative). The Balong 710 was designed to be used with the K3V2 SoC. Its specs:

- LTE FDD mode : 150 Mbit/s downlink and 50 Mbit/s uplink.
- TD-LTE mode: up to 112 Mbit/s downlink and up to 30 Mbit/s uplink.
- WCDMA Dual Carrier with MIMO: 84 Mbit/s downlink and 23 Mbit/s uplink.

=== Balong 720 ===
The Balong 720 supports LTE Cat6 with 300 Mbit/s peak download rate. Its specs:

- TSMC 28 nm HPM process
- TD-LTE Cat.6 standard
- Dual-carrier aggregation for the 40 MHz bandwidth
- 5-mode LTE Cat6 Modem

=== Balong 750 ===
The Balong 750 supports LTE Cat 12/13, and it is first to support 4CC CA and 3.5 GHz. Its specs:

- LTE Cat.12 and Cat.13 UL network standards
- 2CC (dual-carrier) data aggregation
- 4x4 multiple-input multiple-output (MIMO)
- TSMC 16 nm FinFET+ process

=== Balong 765 ===
The Balong 765 supports 8×8 MIMO technology, LTE Cat.19 with downlink data-rate up to 1.6 Gbit/s in FDD network and up to 1.16 Gbit/s in the TD-LTE network. Its specs:

- 3GPP Rel.14
- LTE Cat.19 Peak data rate up to 1.6 Gbit/s
- 4CC CA + 4×4 MIMO/2CC CA + 8×8 MIMO
- DL 256QAM
- C-V2X

=== Balong 5G01 ===
The Balong 5G01 supports the 3GPP standard for 5G with downlink speeds of up to 2.3 Gbit/s. It supports 5G across all frequency bands including sub-6 GHz and millimeter wave (mmWave). Its specs:

- 3GPP Release 15
- Peak data rate up to 2.3 Gbit/s
- Sub-6 GHz and mmWave
- NSA/SA
- DL 256QAM

=== Balong 5000 ===
The Balong 5000 was the world's first 7 nm TSMC 5G multi-mode chipset (launched in Q1 2019), the world's first SA/NSA implementation, and the first smartphone chipset to support the full NR TDD/FDD spectrum. The modem has an advanced 2G, 3G, 4G, and 5G connectivity. Its specs:

- 2G/3G/4G/5G Multi Mode
- Fully compliant with 3GPP Release 15
- Sub-6 GHz: 100 MHz x 2CC CA
- Sub-6 GHz: Downlink up to 4.6 Gbit/s, Uplink up to 2.5 Gbit/s
- mmWave: Downlink up to 6.5 Gbit/s, Uplink up to 3.5 Gbit/s
- NR+LTE: Downlink up to 7.5 Gbit/s
- FDD & TDD Spectrum Access
- SA & NSA Fusion Network Architecture
- Supports 3GPP R14 V2X
- 3 GB LPDDR4X RAM

=== Balong 6000 ===
The Balong 6000 is an iteration of the HiSilicon Balong 5G baseband series and first appeared in the Huawei Mate 70 Pro, launched on November 26, 2024.

It is one of the first 3GPP Rel. 18 and therefore 5.5G/5G-Advanced supporting modem in the world alongside the Qualcomm Snapdragon X75/X80 and onwards series.

- 2G/3G/4G/5G Multi Mode
- Fully compliant with 3GPP Release 17, probably compliant with 3GPP Release 18
- Sub-6 GHz: 100 MHz x 4CC CA
- Sub-6 GHz: Downlink up to 4.6 Gbit/s, Uplink up to 2.5 Gbit/s
- mmWave: Downlink up to 12 Gbit/s, Uplink up to 3.5 Gbit/s
- NR+LTE: Downlink up to 10 Gbit/s
- FDD & TDD Spectrum Access
- SA & NSA Fusion Network Architecture

== Wearable SoCs ==
HiSilicon develops SoCs for wearables such as wireless earbuds, wireless headphones, neckband earbuds, smart speakers, smart eyewear, and smartwatches.

=== Kirin A1 ===
The Kirin A1 (Hi1132) was announced on 6 September 2019 built for TWS devices. It features:

- BT/BLE dual-mode Bluetooth 5.1
- Isochronous Dual Channel transmission technology
- 356 MHz audio processor
- Cortex-M7 microprocessor

=== Kirin A2 ===
The Kirin A2 was announced on September 25, 2023. It features:

- Faster Transmission
- Stable signal with Polar code technology
- Increase of 50% in computing power performance
- Audio Vivid
- Ascend Nano NPU
- NearLink compatible

=== Kirin W80 ===
The Kirin W80 was announced on May 15, 2025 built for Watches. It features:

- arm64-v8a design
- NearLink compatible
- Ascend Nano NPU
- XTAP health sensor support
- 1.7GHz Quad-core processor
- 492MHz GPU

== Server processors ==
HiSilicon develops server processor SoCs based on the ARM architecture.

=== Hi1610 ===
The Hi1610 is HiSilicon's first generation server processor announced in 2015. It features:

- 16x ARM Cortex-A57 at up to 2.1 GHz
- 48 KB L1-I, 32 KB L1-D, 1 MB L2/4 cores and 16 MB CCN L3
- TSMC 16 nm
- 2x DDR4-1866
- 16 PCIe 3.0

=== Hi1612 ===
The Hi1612 is HiSilicon's second generation server processor launched in 2016. It is the first chiplet-based Kunpeng with two computing dies. It features:

- 32x ARM Cortex-A57 at up to 2.1 GHz
- 48 KB L1-I, 32 KB L1-D, 1 MB L2/4 cores and 32 MB CCN L3
- TSMC 16 nm
- 4x DDR4-2133
- 16 PCIe 3.0

=== Kunpeng 916 (formerly Hi1616) ===
The Kunpeng 916 (formerly known as Hi1616) is HiSilicon's third generation server processor launched in 2017. The Kunpeng 916 is used in Huawei's TaiShan 2280 Balanced Server, TaiShan 5280 Storage Server, TaiShan XR320 High-Density Server Node and TaiShan X6000 High-Density Server. It features:

- 32x ARM Cortex-A72 at up to 2.4 GHz
- 48 KB L1-I, 32 KB L1-D, 1 MB L2/4 cores and 32 MB CCN L3
- TSMC 16 nm
- 4x DDR4-2400
- 2-way Symmetric multiprocessing (SMP), Each socket has 2x ports with 96 Gbit/s per port (total of 192 Gbit/s per each socket interconnects)
- 46 PCIe 3.0 and 8x 10 Gigabit Ethernet
- 85 W

=== Kunpeng 920 (formerly Hi1620) ===
The Kunpeng 920 (formerly known as Hi1620) is HiSilicon's fourth generation server processor announced in 2018, and launched in 2019. Huawei claims the Kunpeng 920 CPU scores more than an estimated 930 on SPECint_rate_base2006. The Kunpeng 920 is used in Huawei's TaiShan 2280 V2 Balanced Server, TaiShan 5280 V2 Storage Server, and TaiShan XA320 V2 High-Density Server Node. It features:

- 32 to 64x custom TaiShan V110 cores at up to 2.6 GHz.
- The TaiShan V110 core is a 4-way superscalar, out-of-order microarchitecture that implements the ARMv8.2-A ISA. Huawei reports the core supports almost all the ARMv8.4-A ISA features with a few exceptions, including the dot product and FP16 FML extensions.
- The TaiShan V110 cores are likely a new core not based on ARM designs
- 3x Simple ALUs, 1x Complex MDU, 2x BRUs (sharing ports with ALU2/3), 2x FSUs (ASIMD FPU), 2x LSUs
- 64 KB L1-I, 64 KB L1-D, 512 KB Private L2 and 1 MB L3/core Shared.
- TSMC 7 nm HPC
- 8x DDR4-3200
- 2-way and 4-way symmetric multiprocessing (SMP). Each socket has 3x Hydra ports with 240 Gbit/s per port (total of 720 Gbit/s per each socket interconnects)
- 40 PCIe 4.0 with CCIX support, 4x USB 3.0, 2x SATA 3.0, 8x SAS 3.0 and 2x 100 Gigabit Ethernet
- 100 to 200 W
- Compression engine (GZIP, LZS, LZ4) capable of up to 40 Gbit/s compress and 100 Gbit/s decompress
- Crypto offload engine (for AES, DES, 3DES, SHA1/2, etc..) capable of throughputs up to 100 Gbit/s

=== Kunpeng 920B (formerly Hi1630V100) ===
The Kunpeng 920B (formerly known as Hi1630V100) is HiSilicon's fifth-generation server processor announced in 2019 and scheduled for launch in 2021. It features:

- 80 custom TaishanV120 cores at 2.9 GHz frequency, with support for simultaneous multithreading (SMT) and ARM's Scalable Vector Extension (SVE).
- 64 KB L1-I, 64 KB L1-D, 512 KB Private L2 and 1 MB L3/core Shared
- TSMC 5 nm
- 8x DDR5

=== Kunpeng 950 ===
The Kunpeng 950 is HiSilicon's sixth-generation server processor announced in 2019 and scheduled for launch in 2023.

== AI acceleration ==
HiSilicon has developed the Huawei Ascend (also known as HiSilicon Ascend) line of artificial intelligence (AI) acceleration chips. The product line was introduced in 2018 upon the release of the Ascend 310 and Ascend 910 SoCs.

=== Da Vinci architecture ===
Each Da Vinci Max AI Core features a 3D Cube Tensor Computing Engine (4096 FP16 MACs + 8192 INT8 MACs), a vector unit (2048bit INT8/FP16/FP32), and a scalar unit. It includes a new AI framework called "MindSpore", a platform-as-a-service product called ModelArts, and a lower-level library called Compute Architecture for Neural Networks (CANN).

==== Ascend 310 ====
The Ascend 310 is an AI inference SoC, it was codenamed Ascend-Mini. The Ascend 310 is capable of 16 TOPS@INT8 and 8 TOPS@FP16. The Ascend 310 features:

- 2x Da Vinci Max AI cores
- 8x ARM Cortex-A55 CPU cores
- 8 MB on-chip buffer
- 16 channel video decode – H.264/H.265
- 1 channel video encode – H.264/H.265
- TSMC 12 nm FFC process
- 8W TDP

==== Ascend 910 ====
The Ascend 910 is an AI training SoC, it was codenamed Ascend-Max, which delivers 256 TFLOPS@FP16 and 512 TOPS@INT8. The Ascend 910 features:

- 32x Da Vinci Max AI cores arranged in 4 clusters
- 1024-bit NoC Mesh @ 2 GHz, with 128 GB/s bandwidth Read/Write per core
- 3x 240 Gbit/s HCCS ports for Numa connections
- 2x 100 Gbit/s RoCE interfaces for networking
- 4x HBM2E, 1.2 TB/s bandwidth
- 3D-SRAM stacked below AI SoC die
- 1228 mm^{2} Total die size (456 mm^{2} Virtuvian AI SoC, 168 mm^{2} Nimbus V3 IO Die, 4x96 mm^{2} HBM2E, 2x110 mm^{2} Dummy Die)
- 32 MB on-chip buffer
- 128 channel video decode – H.264/H.265
- TSMC 7 nm EUV (N7+) process
- 350 W

==== Ascend 910B ====
Ascend 910B is manufactured by SMIC and is very different from Ascend 910.

- 21.32 mm × 31.22 mm size
- 25 DaVinci AI cores
- produced using SMIC 7nm N+1 process

==== Ascend 910C ====
Huawei Ascend 910C is expected to be mass shipped in May 2025, Ascend 910C combines two Ascend 910B processors. Ascend 910C is an evolution rather than a breakthrough, it achieves performance similar to NVIDIA H100. NVIDIA H100 chips were banned from sale to China by US government in 2022.

DeepSeek researchers say Huawei Ascend 910C provides 60% of NVIDIA H100 inference performance. Ascend 910C compute chiplet is made by SMIC at 2nd generation 7nm process known as N+2.

DeepSeek R1 model was trained on NVIDIA H800, but runs inference on Ascend 910C.

Huawei is expected to sell more than 800,000 of Ascend 910B and Ascend 910C in 2025.

In late April 2025 Huawei started delivering to customers CloudMatrix 384 - a cluster consisting of Ascend 910C chips. The system performs better than NVL72 (72 GB200 chips) from NVIDIA, however the power consumption is significantly higher. CloudMatrix 384 sells for Rmb60mn ($8.2mn) a set. CloudMatrix 384 solution provides 2.3x lower performance per watt than Nvidia's GB200 NVL72. The systems consists of 16 racks including 12 computing racks and 4 networking ones facilitating high-bandwidth using 6912 800G LPO optical transceivers. CloudMatrix uses entirely optical connections for intra- and inter-rack connectivity.

==== Ascend 910D ====
In late April 2025 WSJ has reported that Huawei approached several China based companies about testing Ascend 910D, the companies will receive first samples in May 2025.

==== Ascend 920 ====
Ascend 920 was announced in April 2025 and expected to provide performance similar to NVIDIA H20 chip (which was banned in April 2025 from selling to China). Ascend 920 is expected to be mass produced in late 2025. Ascend 920 features:

- 6nm SMIC process
- HBM3 memory, 4 TB/s bandwidth
- 900 TFLOPs per card

==== Ascend 950 ====
950DT and 950PR was announced in September 2025 at Huawei Connect 2025 event. Part of Atlas 950, TaiShan 950 and Atlas 960 SuperPoDs.

== Semiconductor equipment export control by US ==
In 2018, the U.S. government started to pressure ASML not to sell new EUV (extreme ultraviolet) machines to China.

In 2022, the U.S. government was lobbying the Dutch government to bar ASML from selling older DUV (deep ultraviolet) machines to China. These DUV machines are a generation behind of newer EUV models.

In 2022, Lam Research and Applied Materials have suspended sales and services to Chinese counterparts.

In late 2024, the U.S. government expanded export control which will hit semiconductor toolmakers such as KLA Corporation, Lam Research and Applied Materials.

In 2025, China-based SiCarrier emerged as a discrete manufacturer replacing products from ASML, Lam Research and Applied Materials.

In late May 2025, the USA administration has told to Cadence Design Systems, Synopsys and Siemens EDA to stop supplying their products to China. The restrictions have encouraged the China-based EDA companies such as Empyrean Technology, Primarius and Semitronix to significantly grow market share.

In September 2025, SMIC (the largest foundry in China) has started testing the first domestically produced DUV lithography equipment (DUV is the previous generation before EUV). This set of tools was developed by Shanghai Yuliangsheng Technology Co.. The machine is designed for 28nm fabrication, although it can be used for 7nm and 5nm fabrication using multipatterning techniques. It is expected that the mass production of DUV machines will begin in 2027.

In July 2026, Shanghai Aishengna Electronic Technology Group (having absorbed Shanghai Yuliangsheng Technology), a secretive Chinese state-backed company, has started mass producing DUV lithography machines: about one unit per month in 2026 and twice more in 2027.

== See also ==
- Semiconductor industry
- Semiconductor industry in China
- Xiaomi Semiconductor
