= Huawei MateBook =

Range of laptops produced by Huawei

Huawei MateBook series
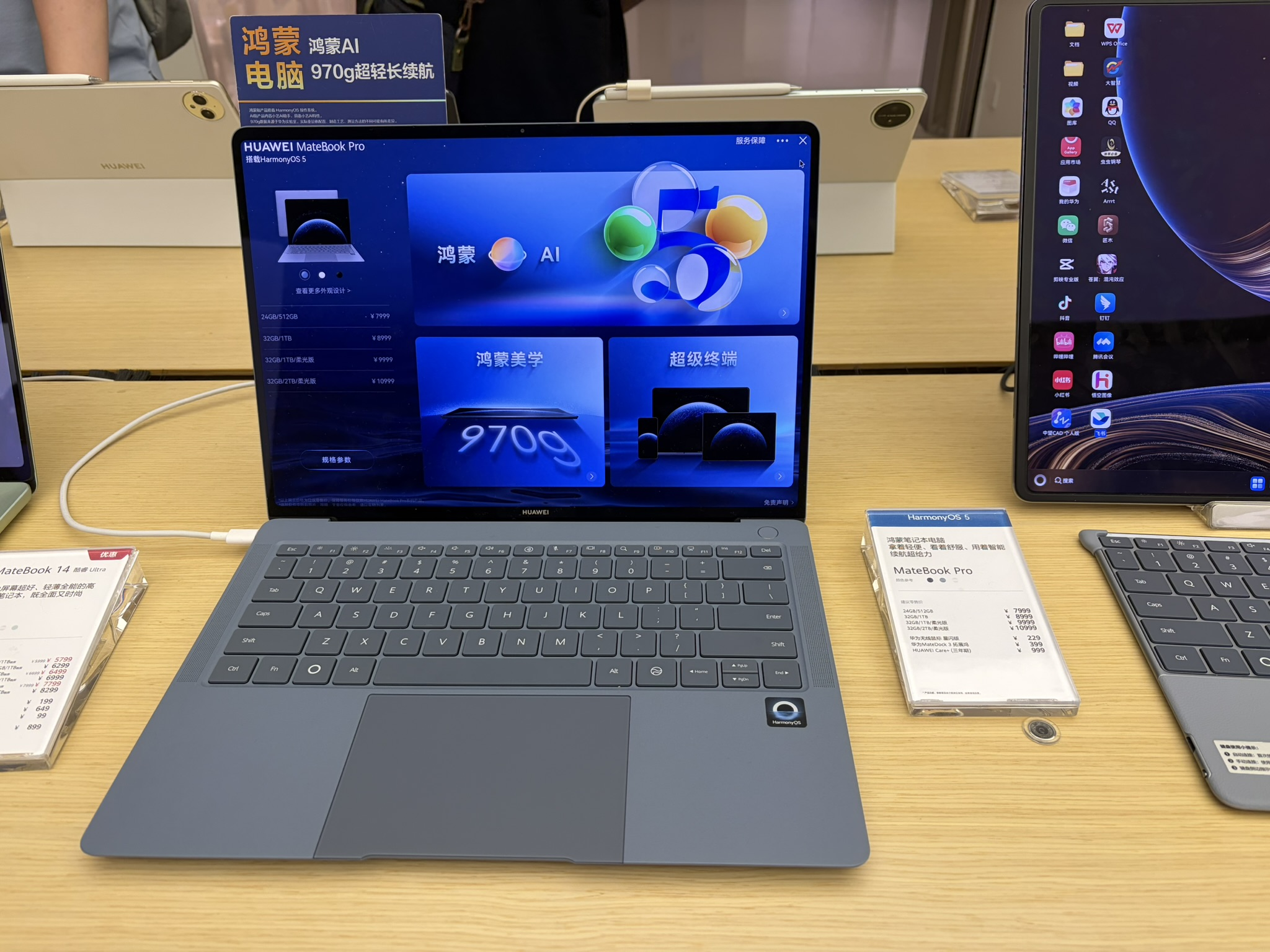
- Huawei Matebook Pro with HarmonyOS
- Developer: Huawei
- Product family: Huawei MateBook
- Type: Laptop/Ultrabook/Hybrid tablets/2-in-1 laptops
- Released: 21 February 2016; 10 years ago
- Operating system: Deepin (China); Windows (Global 2016-2025); HarmonyOS (2025-present)
- CPU: Intel / AMD (Windows) Kirin (HarmonyOS)
- Memory: 8GB/16GB RAM
- Storage: 256 GB/512 GB/1 TB/2 TB SSD
- Marketing target: Consumer
- Website: Official website

The Huawei MateBook series is a range of laptops produced by Huawei. They were originally released on the eve of the opening of the Mobile World Congress on 21 February 2016. Further models have been released in subsequent years such as in September 2019, when Huawei began offering Deepin as a preloaded operating system on selected Matebook models in China.

The Windows-powered Huawei MateBook X Pro was the top of the range model.

Huawei launched HarmonyOS 5-powered MateBook Pro and Fold laptop line on May 19, 2025, that went on sale June 6, 2025 exclusively in China after debut of HarmonyOS computer system on May 8, 2025, as current entire annual product lineup series. This comes after Windows expired license failed to get renewed by Microsoft due to latest US tech export restrictions reported in March 2025.

== Products ==
=== Windows-powered MateBooks ===
Name	Release date	Processor	RAM	Storage	Screen size	Colours
MateBook	February 21, 2016	Intel Core M	8 GB	512 GB	12 inches/304 mm	White
MateBook E	2017	Intel Core i5	4 GB/8 GB	128 GB(entry)/256 GB	12 inches/304 mm	White
MateBook X	2017	Intel Core i5	8 GB	128 GB/1 TB	13 inches/330 mm	Space Gray
MateBook D	June 2017	Intel Core i7	8 GB	128 GB/1 TB	15 inches/381 mm	Space Gray
MateBook X Pro 2024	2024	Intel Core Ultra 9	16 GB/32 GB	1 TB/2 TB	14.2 inches/360 mm	Black/White/Morandi Blue
MateBook 14 2024	2024	Intel Core Ultra 5/7	16 GB	512 GB	14.2 inches/360 mm	Green/Space Grey
MateBook D14 2024	2024	Intel H/Intel Core i5	16 GB	512 GB	14 inches/355 mm	Bright Moon Silver/Deep Space Gray
MateBook D 16 2024	2024	Intel Core i9/i7/i5	16 GB	512 GB/1 TB	16 inches/355 mm	Space Gray
MateBook 14 2023	2023	Intel Core i7	16 GB	512 GB/1 TB	14 inches/355 mm	Space Gray
MateBook X Pro 2023	2023	Intel Core i7	16 GB	1 TB	14.2 inches/360 mm	Dragonfly-like Ink Blue/White/Space Gray
MateBook D 16 2023	April 2023	Intel Core i9/i5/i7	16 GB	512 GB/1 TB	16 inches/355 mm	Space Gray
MateBook 16s (2023)	2023	Intel Core i9	16 GB	1 TB	16 inches/406 mm	Space Gray
MateBook 14 2022	2022	Intel Core i7	16 GB	512 GB	14 inches/355 mm	Space Gray
MateBook X Pro 2022	2022	Intel Core i7	16 GB	1 TB	14 inches/355 mm	Dragonfly-like Ink Blue/White/Space Gray
MateBook E 2022	2022	Intel Core i5	8 GB/16 GB	128 GB/256 GB/512 GB	12.6 inches/355 mm	Nebula Grey
MateBook D 16 2022	2022	Intel Core i7/i5	16 GB	512 GB/256 GB	16 inches/355 mm	Space Gray
MateBook 16	2022	AMD Ryzen 7	16 GB	512 GB	16 inches/406 mm	Space Gray
MateBook 14 2021	2022	AMD Ryzen 5	16 GB	512 GB	14 inches/355 mm	Space Gray
MateBook D15 (2021)	2021	AMD Ryzen 5	8 GB	512 GB	15.6 inches/396 mm	Space Grey
MateBook 14s 2021	2021	Intel Core i7	16 GB	512 GB/1 TB	14.2 inches/360 mm	Spruce Green
MateBook X Pro 2021	2021	Intel Core i5 11th Gen/ Intel Core i7 11th Gen	16 GB	512 GB/1 TB	13.9 inches/353 mm	Space Gray
MateBook X Pro 2020	24 February 2020	Intel Core i5 10th Gen/ Intel Core i7 10th Gen	16 GB	512 GB/1 TB	13.9 inches/353 mm	Space Gray
MateBook 13 2020	7 February 2020	Intel Core i5 10th Gen/ Intel Core i7 10th Gen/ AMD Ryzen 5	8 GB/16 GB	256 GB/512 GB	13 inches/330 mm	Space Gray
MateBook D 14	26 November 2019	AMD Ryzen 5	8 GB	512 GB	14 inches/355 mm	Space Gray
MateBook D 15	26 November 2019	AMD Ryzen 5	8 GB	256 GB	15.6 inches/396 mm	Space Gray
MateBook X Pro 2019	24 February 2019	Intel Core i5 8th Gen/ Intel Core i7 8th Gen	8 GB	512 GB	13.9 inches/353 mm	Space Gray
MateBook 13 2019	24 February 2019	Intel Core i5 8th Gen/ Intel Core i7 8th Gen	8 GB	512 GB	13 inches/330 mm	Mystic Silver/Space Grey
MateBook D	August 2018	AMD Ryzen 5	8 GB	256 GB	14 inches/355 mm	Space Gray
MateBook X Pro 2018	March 2018	Intel Core i7	16 GB	256 GB	13 inches/330 mm	Space Gray
MateBook X Pro 2018	March 2018	Intel Core i7	16 GB	256 GB	13 inches/330 mm	Space Gray
MateBook D 15	2018	Intel Core i5	16 GB	500 GB/1 TB	15 inches/381 mm	Gold

=== HarmonyOS-powered MateBooks ===
Name	Release date	Processor	RAM	Storage	Screen size	Colours
MateBook Pro 2025	June 6, 2025	Kirin X90	24 GB(entry)/32 GB	512 GB(entry)/1 TB	14.2 inches/310 mm	Black, White, Blue, Dawn Pink
MateBook Fold	June 6, 2025	Kirin X90	32 GB	1 TB(entry)/2 TB	18 inches/457 mm	Blue, Black, White & Ruihong Red
