= MateBook Fold =

2025 foldable laptop by Huawei

Huawei MateBook Fold Ultimate Design
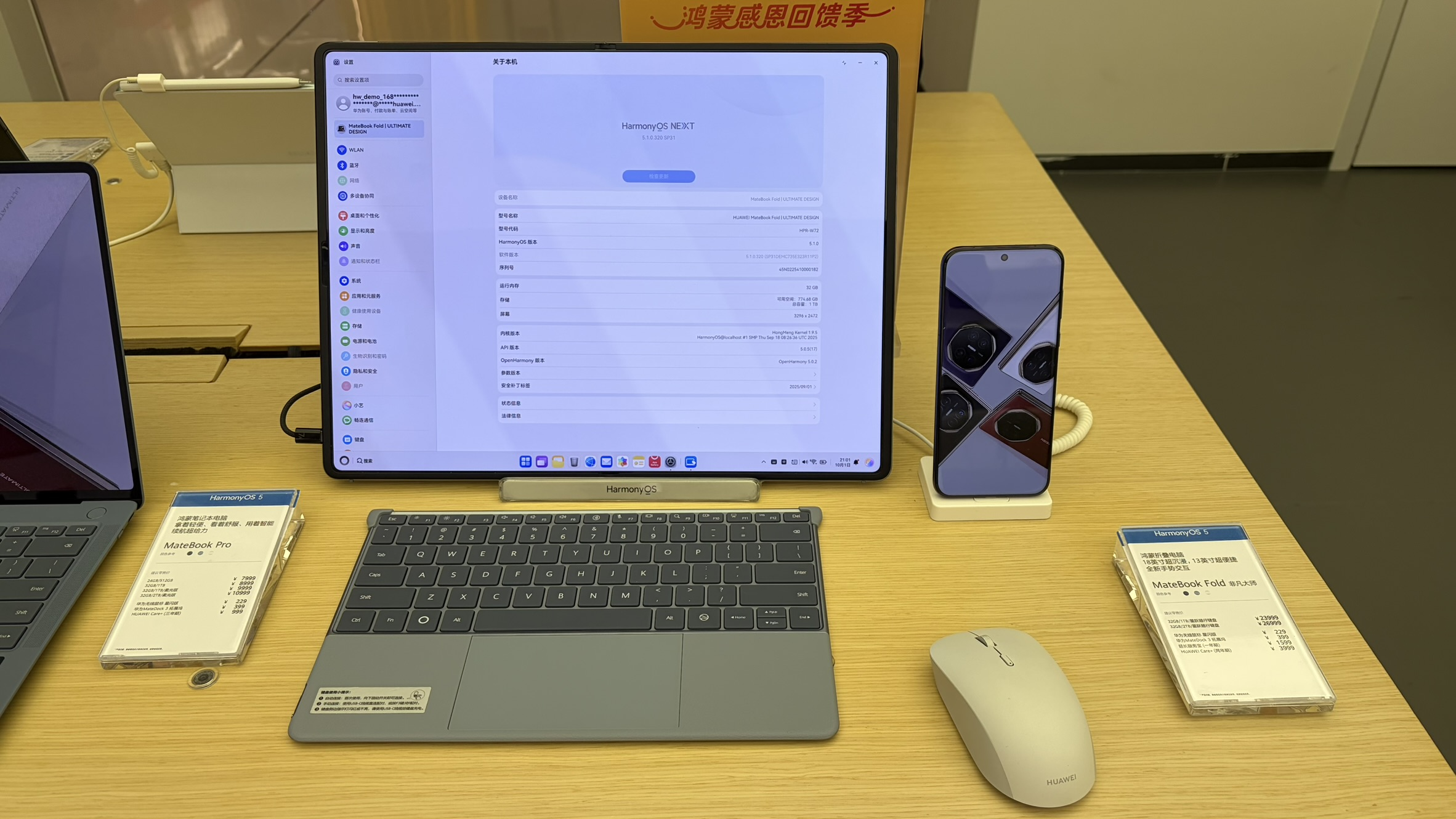
- The Huawei MateBook Fold unfolded.
- Developer: Huawei
- Manufacturer: Huawei
- Product family: MateBook
- Type: Foldable 2-in-1 PC
- Generation: 1st
- Released: 6 June 2025; 11 months ago (China)
- Operating system: HarmonyOS 5 (PC Debut)
- System on a chip: Kirin X90
- Memory: 32 GB
- Storage: 1 TB, 2 TB
- Display: 18-inch foldable dual-layer OLED, 3296 × 2472 (3.3K)
- Sound: 6-speaker system
- Input: Multi-touch screen, optional magnetic keyboard
- Camera: 8 MP front-facing
- Touchpad: On optional physical keyboard
- Connectivity: Wi-Fi 7, Bluetooth 5.4, NearLink 2.0, 2× USB-C
- Dimensions: Unfolded: 7.3 mm (0.29 in) thick Folded: 14.9 mm (0.59 in) thick
- Weight: 1.16 kg (2.6 lb)
- Website: Official Website

The Huawei MateBook Fold Ultimate Design (Chinese: 华为 MateBook Fold 非凡大师, stylized as HUAWEI MateBook Fold) is Huawei's first foldable 2-in-1 PC developed and marketed by them. Announced in May 2025, it is notable for being the company's first laptop to feature a foldable display and the first PC to launch with its HarmonyOS 5 operating system. Huawei has positioned it as a premium "Ultimate Design" product. The MateBook Fold is part of Huawei's move towards full self-sufficiency.

== History ==
Huawei unveiled the MateBook Fold Ultimate Design on May 19, 2025. The launch marked an expansion of the company's product portfolio into a new category of foldable computing and represented the debut of its HarmonyOS NEXT platform for PCs. The device was initially released exclusively in the Chinese market, with a starting price of ¥23,999 (approximately $3,300 USD). In November 2025, Huawei released a visual refresh of the device, adding a new "Ruihong" (Auspicious Red) color variant for the high-end storage model.

== Design and hardware ==
The MateBook Fold's primary feature is its 18-inch flexible OLED display, which folds at a 90-degree angle to transform the device into a compact form with two 13-inch screens. When fully unfolded, the device is 7.3 mm thick, making it thinner than many contemporary smartphones, and weighs 1.16 kg. A "zirconium-based alloy" hinge allows the screen to be set at angles between 30 and 150 degrees. The rear of the device incorporates an integrated kickstand and is finished in artificial leather.

=== Display ===
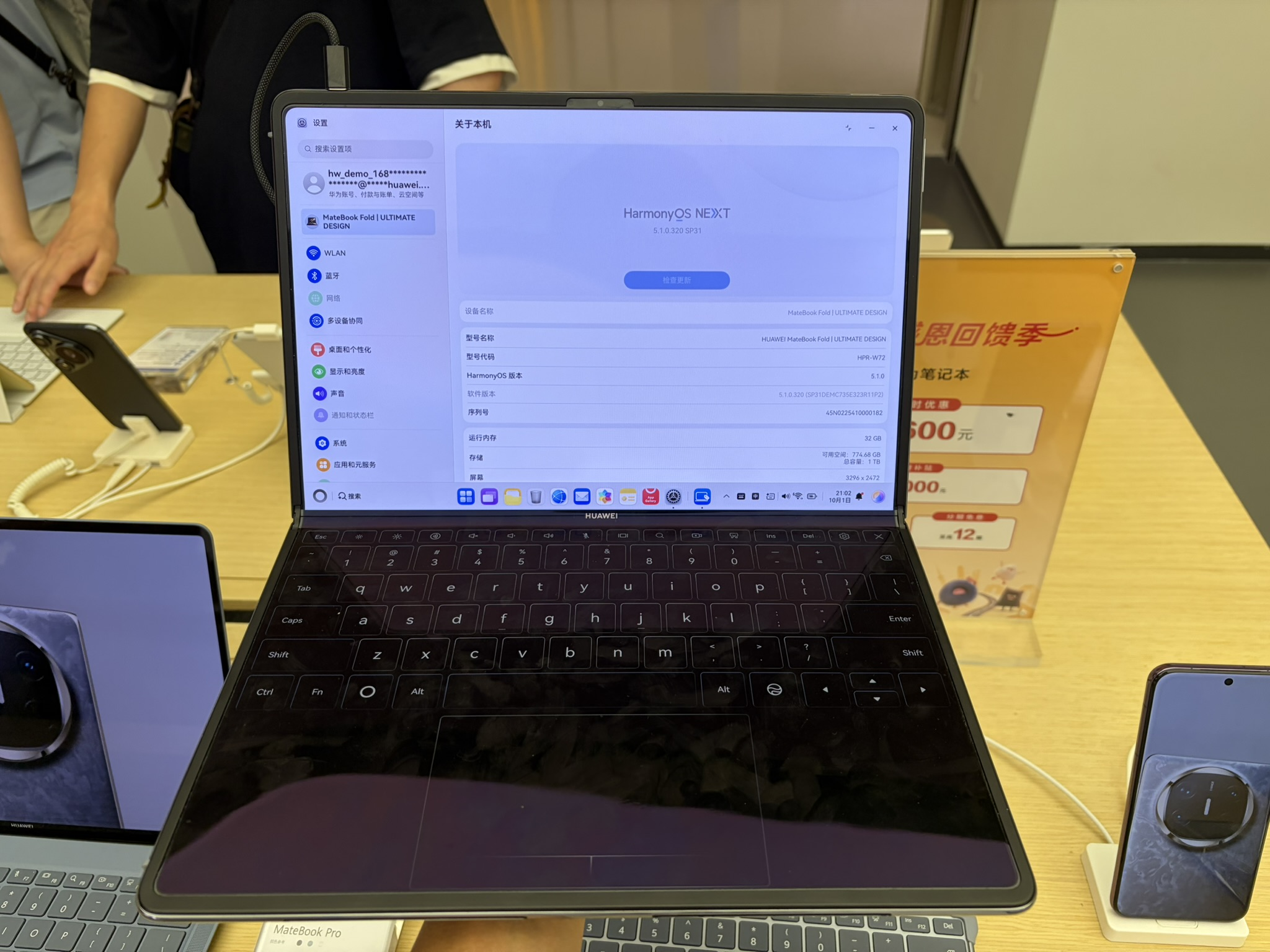
MateBook Fold in laptop mode

The foldable display is a dual-layer ("tandem") OLED panel. Key specifications include a 3.3K (3296 x 2472) resolution, a peak brightness of 1600 nits, support for the P3 wide color gamut, and an LTPO backplane for adaptive refresh rates. Huawei states the display uses a non-Newtonian fluid buffer layer and a carbon fiber support layer to improve durability and impact resistance.

=== Processor and platform ===
The device is powered by the in-house Kirin X90 processor. Independent teardown analysis confirmed that this chip is fabricated on SMIC's 7 nm (N+2) process node. This detail was covered as an indicator of the state of China's semiconductor capabilities amidst international trade sanctions, placing Huawei several generations behind leading-edge chips from Apple, Qualcomm, and AMD.

=== Design ===
Color	Name
	Forged Shadow Black
	Cloud Water Blue
	Sky White
	Ruihong (Auspicious Red)

=== Other features ===
The device includes up to 32 GB of RAM and 2 TB of storage, a vapor chamber cooling system with dual fans, a 74.69 Wh battery, and a six-speaker audio system. It includes two USB-C ports and supports an optional, ultra-thin wireless magnetic keyboard.

== Software ==
The MateBook Fold is the first PC to ship with HarmonyOS 5. The operating system is designed to adapt to the foldable form factor, reorganizing application windows when the device is folded or unfolded. It also enables deep integration with other Huawei devices (phones, tablets) for features like cross-device file sharing, app continuation, and multi-screen collaboration.

== Reception and analysis ==
The launch of the MateBook Fold was covered as a significant industry event, with commentary centering on its foldable technology, its position within Huawei’s ecosystem, and its geopolitical context. From a technology and design perspective, reviewers emphasized the device’s engineering, particularly its thin profile and large, dual-layer foldable OLED display, with outlets such as The Verge and New Atlas highlighting its physical design and specifications. Supply-chain analysis from Omdia identified China Star as the display manufacturer. In terms of form factor and portability, the device weighs approximately 80 grams less than the 2025 MacBook Air, placing it within the same class of ultra-portable laptops typically associated with frequent business travel. It has described the MateBook Fold as part of Huawei’s effort to establish an alternative personal computing platform through HarmonyOS, positioning it outside the dominant Windows and macOS ecosystems. Geopolitical analysis focused heavily on the Kirin X90 processor and ongoing U.S. sanctions, confirming fabrication on SMIC’s 7 nm process, showing Huawei’s move towards semiconductor self-sufficiency, and the remaining technological gap compared to leading-edge nodes. The MateBook Fold’s China-only release was commonly attributed to regulatory constraints and trade dynamics associated with this geopolitical environment.

=== Market position ===
The MateBook Fold has limited availability outside China.

== See also ==
- Huawei MateBook – The main series page for Huawei laptops.
- Foldable smartphone – Overview of foldable display technology.
- HarmonyOS – Huawei's proprietary operating system.
