= Honor Magic 2 =

2018 smartphone by Honor

- Brand: Honor
- Manufacturer: Huawei
- Type: Phablet
- Series: Honor Magic series
- First released: November 2018; 8 years ago
- Predecessor: Honor Magic
- Successor: Honor Magic 3
- Related: Xiaomi Mi MIX 3
- Compatible networks: 2G, 3G, 4G, 4G LTE
- Form factor: Slate
- Dimensions: 157.32 mm × 75.13 mm × 8.3 mm (6.194 in × 2.958 in × 0.327 in)
- Weight: 206 g (7.3 oz)
- Operating system: Magic UI 2.0 or EMUI 9.0 on top of Android 9.0 "Pie"
- System-on-chip: HiSilicon Kirin 980
- GPU: ARM Mali-G76 MP10, 720Mhz
- Memory: 6 GB 8 GB RAM
- Storage: 128 GB or 256 GB
- Removable storage: No card slot
- Battery: Non-removable 3500 mAh
- Rear camera: Triple 16 MP, (f/1.8) + 16 MP, (f/2.2) + 24 MP, (f/1.8)
- Front camera: Triple 16 MP (f/2.0) + 2x 2 MP (f/2.4)
- Display: 2340x1080 1080p AMOLED capacitive touchscreen '; 6.39 in (162 mm), 403 ppi
- Data inputs: Sensors: Gravity; Proximity; Hall; Ambient Light; Front 3D camera; In-Display Fingerprint; Other: Physical sound volume keys
- Website: Honor Magic 2

The Honor Magic 2 is a flagship Android-based smartphone from the Honor sub-brand of phones made by Huawei. It was exclusively introduced to Chinese market. Notable features of this phone include a slider design, six cameras, an in-screen fingerprint sensor, and a notch-free bezel-less display.
