= Huawei MateBook X Pro =

Laptop produced by Huawei

Huawei-Matebook X Pro
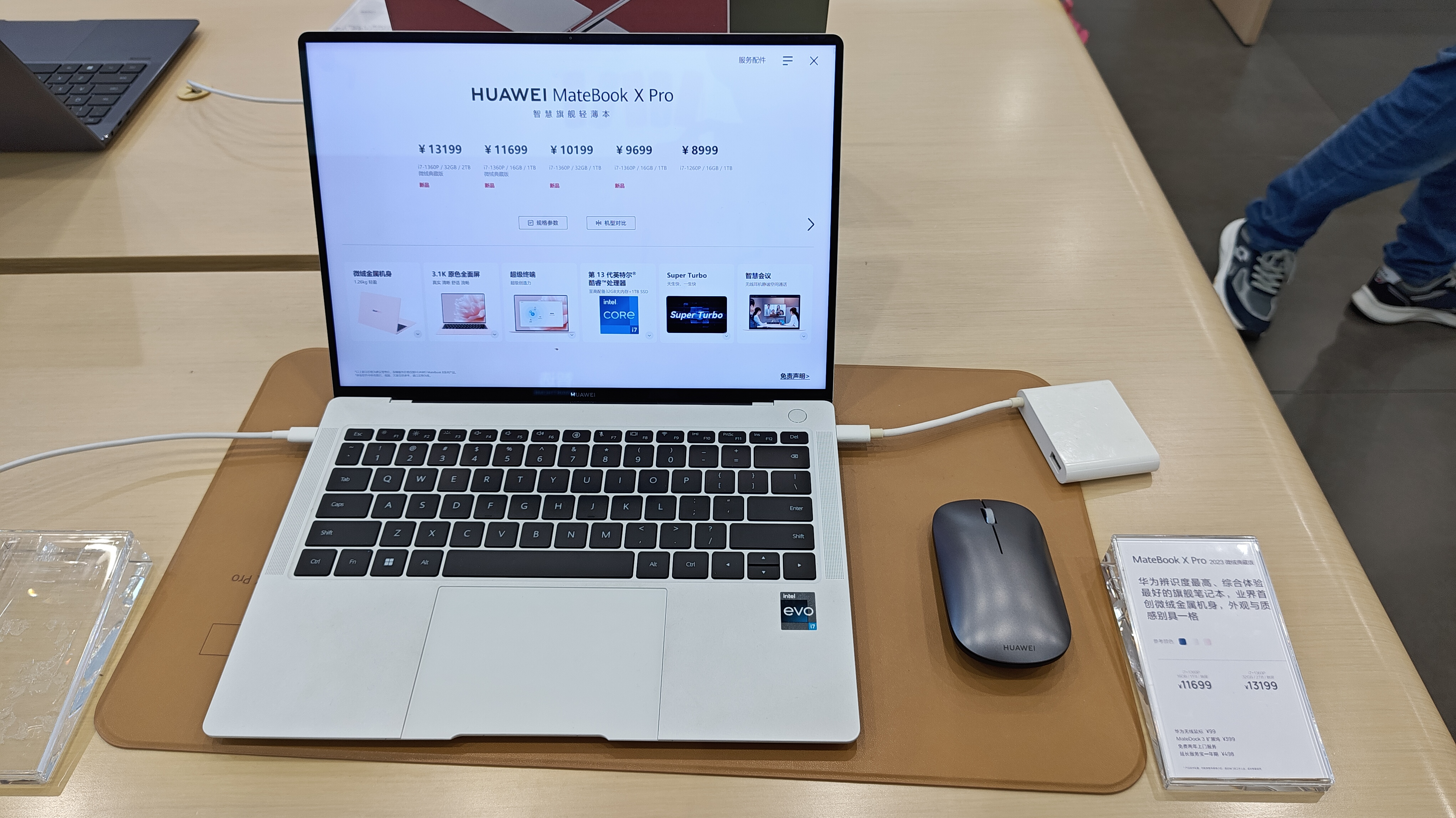
- Developer: Huawei
- Manufacturer: Huawei
- Product family: Huawei MateBook series
- Released: May 21, 2018 (7 years ago)
- Discontinued: to be determined
- Operating system: Windows 10, Windows 11
- CPU: Intel Core i7-10510U; Intel Core i5-10210U
- Memory: 16 GB LPDDR3 RAM
- Storage: 512 GB or 1TB NVMe PCIe SSD
- Display: 13.9″, 3000 × 2000 (260PPI) LTPS
- Graphics: Intel UHD Graphics NVIDIA GeForce MX150 with 2 GB GDDR5 NVIDIA GeForce MX250 with 2 GB GDDR5
- Camera: 1 MP front facing camera
- Dimensions: Width: 304 mm Height: 217 mm Depth: 14.6 mm
- Weight: About 1.33 kg
- Website: consumer.huawei.com/en/laptops/matebook-x-pro/ consumer.huawei.com/en/laptops/matebook-x-pro-2019/
- Language: Chinese or English (US Version)

The Huawei Matebook X Pro is a laptop designed and produced by Huawei. It is part of the Huawei MateBook line of laptops, and has been compared to Apple's MacBook, both in design and interface.

== Release ==
The Huawei Matebook X Pro laptop was first announced at MWC 2018. An updated version was announced at MWC 2019, but was sold in China only until end of 2019. The model of 2020 was advertised at "Huawei Consumer Business Product and Strategy Virtual Launch" due to cancellation of MWC.

== Features ==
=== Software ===
The Huawei Matebook X Pro ships with Windows 10 (Home or Pro), same as Windows 11 known for Microsoft's personal computer operating system.

=== Hardware ===
The Huawei Matebook X Pro is the first laptop in Huawei's lineup to feature what the company is calling "FullView" design, giving the laptop a screen to body ratio of 91%. The display is a 13.9-inch LTPS touchscreen with an aspect ratio of 3:2. The resolution is 3000 × 2000 at 260 PPI with a claimed viewing angle of 178 degrees and a maximum brightness of 450 nits.

In North America the laptop comes in two configurations with the base model using an 8th-generation Intel Core i5-8250U processor with 8 GB of RAM, 256 GB of SSD storage and Intel UHD Graphics 620 while the higher-end model packs an 8th-generation Intel Core i7-8550U processor with 16 GB of RAM, 512 GB of SSD storage and a dedicated NVIDIA GeForce MX150 with 2 GB GDDR5 memory.

== Reception ==
The Huawei Matebook X Pro received positive reviews.

Dan Seifert from "The Verge" praised the laptop's display, performance and design saying "Huawei’s new MateBook X Pro is the best laptop right now." Seifert also compares the keyboard of the Matebook X Pro to Apple's MacBook Pro saying "The keyboard has low travel (1.22mm), but it’s not as low profile or annoying to type on as the keyboard on a MacBook Pro."

Daniel Rubino from "Windows Central" also compared the Matebook X Pro to Apple's MacBook Pro noting, "It may look like a MacBook Pro, but Huawei's latest goes beyond our expectations." concluding that the Matebook X Pro is "An excellent performer with few drawbacks."

== Technical specifications ==
Model	2018				2019						2020		
Release date	February 25, 2018				February 24, 2019						February 24, 2020		
Model number(s)	MACH-W19B	MACH-W19C	MACH-W29A	MACH-W29C	MACHR-W19	MACHR-W19B	MACHR-W19C	MACHR-W29B	MACHR-W29C	MACHR-W29D	MACHC-WAH9L	MACHC-WAH9LP	MACHC-WAE9LP
Display	Size: 13.9 inches Type: LTPS Screen-to-body ratio: 91% Resolution: 3000 × 2000, 260 PPI Aspect ratio: 3:2 Viewing angle: 178 degrees Colour: sRGB 100% colour gamut (Typical Value) Contrast: 1500:1 Maximum Brightness: 450 nits Touchscreen: 10-point, anti-fingerprint												
Video Camera	1 MP												
Processor	Intel Core i5-8250U (8th. Gen.)		Intel Core i7-8550U (8th. Gen.)		Intel Core i5-8265U (8th. Gen.)			Intel Core i7-8565U (8th. Gen.)			Intel Core i5-10210U (10th. Gen.)		Intel Core i7-10510U (10th. Gen.)
Memory	8 GB LPDDR3			16 GB LPDDR3	8 GB LPDDR3				16 GB LPDDR3		8 GB LPDDR3	16 GB LPDDR3	
Graphics	Intel UHD Graphics 620	NVIDIA GeForce MX150 with 2 GB GDDR5			Intel UHD Graphics 620		NVIDIA GeForce MX250 with 2 GB GDDR5		Intel UHD Graphics 620	NVIDIA GeForce MX250 with 2 GB GDDR5	Intel UHD Graphics	NVIDIA GeForce MX250 with 2 GB GDDR5	
Storage	256 GB		512 GB		256 GB	512 GB			1 TB		512 GB		1 TB
Storage	PCIe Gen 3.0 x4 NVMe SSD												
Wi-Fi	Wi-Fi 5 (802.11a/b/g/n/ac), 2.4 / 5 GHz 2 × 2 MIMO				Wi-Fi 5 (802.11a/b/g/n/ac), 2.4 GHz 300 Mbps, 5 GHz 1733 Mbps, 2 × 2 MIMO						Wi-Fi 5 (802.11a/b/g/n/ac)		
Bluetooth	BT 4.1				BT 5.0								
NFC	no				yes								
Peripheral connections	1× Thunderbolt 3 (2 × PCIe lanes)				1× Thunderbolt 3 (4 × PCIe lanes)								
Peripheral connections	1× USB C (USB 3.1 Gen 1) 1× USB A (USB 3.0) 1× 3.5-mm stereo headset jack												
Audio	Dolby Atmos Sound System Quad digital microphones and Quad speakers												
Battery	Lithium polymer 57.4 Wh												
Weight	1.33 kg												
Dimension	304 mm wide × 14.6 mm deep × 217 mm high												
