= Huawei Mate X3 =

Foldable Android smartphone manufactured by Huawei

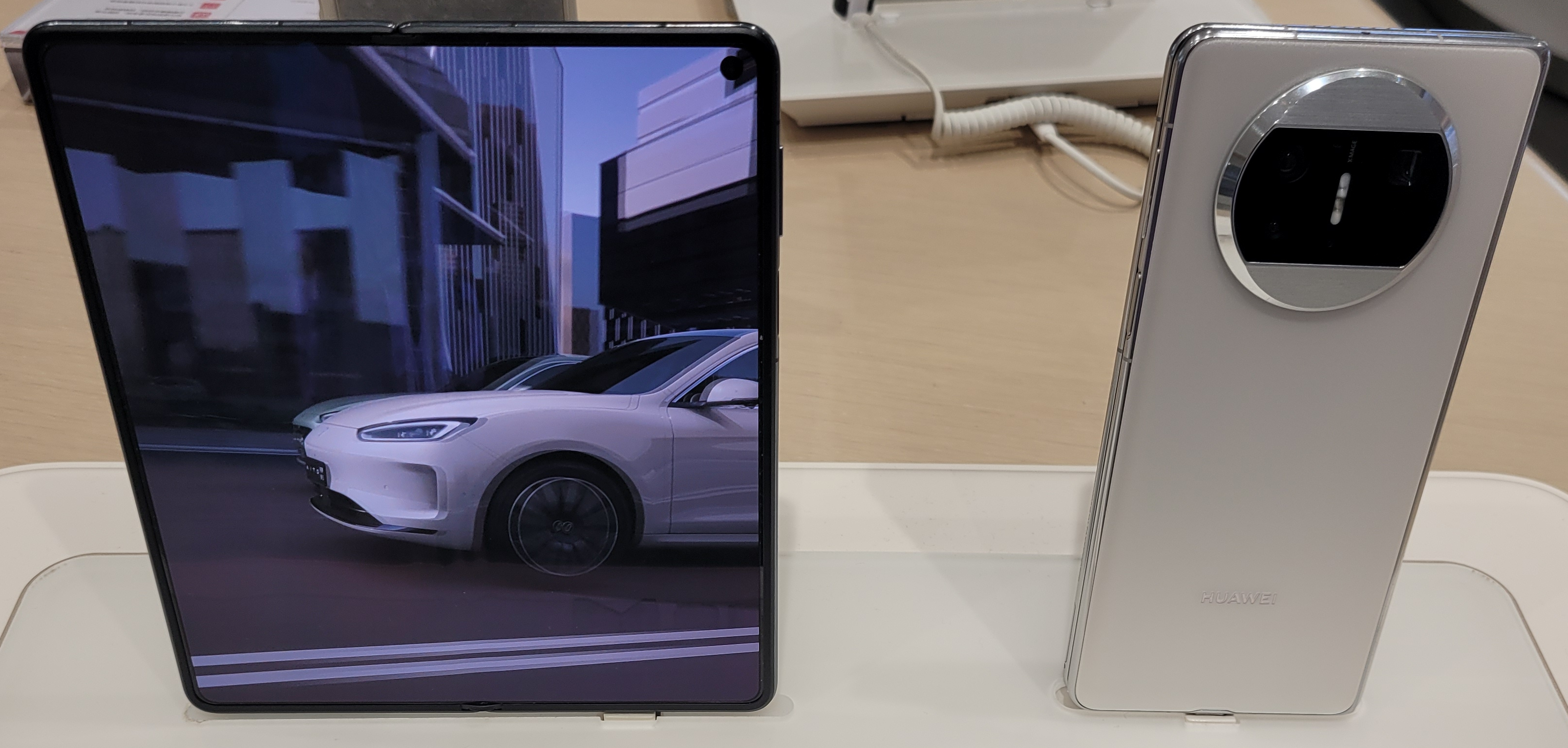
- Huawei Mate X3, front (left) and rear (right)
- Brand: Huawei
- Manufacturer: Huawei
- Series: Huawei Mate Series
- First released: March 23, 2023
- Availability by region: April 8, 2023 (China); May 26, 2023 (Europe and the UK)
- Predecessor: Huawei Mate X2
- Successor: Huawei Mate X5
- Compatible networks: GSM, CDMA, HSPA, EVDO, LTE, 5G (China model only)
- Form factor: Foldable smartphone
- Dimensions: Unfolded: 156.9 mm × 141.5 mm × 5.3 mm (6.18 in × 5.57 in × 0.21 in); Folded: 156.9 mm × 72.4 mm × 11.1 mm (6.18 in × 2.85 in × 0.44 in)
- Weight: 239 g or 241 g (8.43 oz or 8.50 oz)
- Operating system: HarmonyOS 3.1 (China); EMUI 13.1 (Europe)
- System-on-chip: Qualcomm SM8475 Snapdragon 8+ Gen 1 4G (4 nm)
- CPU: Octa-core (1x3.19 GHz Cortex-X2 & 3x2.75 GHz Cortex-A710 & 4x2.0 GHz Cortex-A510)
- GPU: Adreno 730
- Memory: 12 GB RAM
- Storage: 256 GB, 512 GB, or 1 TB
- Removable storage: Nano Memory (uses shared SIM slot), up to 256 GB
- Battery: 4800 mAh Li-Po (Global); 5060 mAh Si/C Li-Ion (China only)
- Charging: 66W wired, 50W wireless, 7.5W reverse wireless
- Rear camera: 50 MP, f/1.8, 23mm (wide), PDAF, OIS; 12 MP, f/3.4, 125mm (periscope telephoto), PDAF, OIS, 5x optical zoom; 13 MP, f/2.2, 13mm (ultrawide), AF; Video: 4K@30/60fps, 1080p@30/60fps, gyro-EIS
- Front camera: Internal: 8 MP, f/2.4 (wide); Cover: 8 MP, f/2.4 (wide); Video: 4K@30fps, 1080p@30fps
- Display: Main: 7.85 in (199 mm) Foldable OLED, 120Hz, 2224 × 2496 pixels (~426 ppi); Cover: 6.4 in (160 mm) OLED, 120Hz, Kunlun Glass, 1080 × 2504 pixels
- Sound: Stereo speakers, no 3.5mm jack
- Connectivity: Wi-Fi 802.11 a/b/g/n/ac/6, Bluetooth 5.2, NFC, Infrared port, USB-C 3.1
- Data inputs: Touchscreen, stylus support (both displays)
- Water resistance: IPX8 dust/water resistant (up to 1.5 m for 30 min)
- Model: ALT-AL00, ALT-L29

The Huawei Mate X3 is a foldable, high-end Android smartphone manufactured, developed, and designed by Huawei. It was announced on March 23, 2023, and released on April 8 for Chinese markets, followed by Europe on May 22 and on May 26 for United Kingdom markets (following its announcement on May 9).

Following its release in China, high demand and supply shortages for the Huawei Mate X3 led to significant price inflation in the secondary market. Third-party retailers reportedly increased prices for the foldable device, with some units selling for between 17,000 and 19,500 yuan.

The Mate X3 is Mate X2's successor, and was succeeded by the Mate X5 on September 8, 2023.

== Development ==
Reports leading up to the release of the Huawei Mate X3 suggested that the device would feature a revised rear camera system and a redesigned cover display compared to the Mate X2. According to leaks from Digital Chat Station, the foldable smartphone's triple-camera array would include a periscope zoom lens utilizing a Sony IMX351 sensor, an IMX766 main camera sensor, and an IMX688 ultrawide sensor. This marked a shift from the Mate X2's quad-camera setup, replacing Leica branding with Huawei's proprietary XMAGE imaging technology.

While the Mate X3 was expected to maintain a form factor similar to its predecessor and the Samsung Galaxy Z Fold4—including an uninterrupted 2K main inner display without a punch-hole camera—changes were noted for the exterior cover screen. The Mate X2's corner-mounted, pill-shaped cutout was reportedly replaced by a single, centered punch-hole camera. Additionally, early reports indicated that the device would feature satellite connectivity and improved portability despite its hardware configuration.

== Design ==
The Huawei Mate X3 features an inward-folding design utilizing an aluminum frame. The device is optimized for a slim profile, measuring 5.3 mm in thickness when unfolded and 11.1 mm when folded. Its dimensions stand at 156.9 mm × 141.5 mm × 5.3 mm in an unfolded state, and 156.9 mm × 72.4 mm × 11.1 mm when closed. Depending on the material choice for the rear panel, the device weighs either 239 grams or 241 grams.

The external cover display is protected by Huawei's proprietary Kunlun Glass. The rear build of the smartphone varies by color variant, offering options between standard glass or an eco-leather back. It is available in five colors: Black, White, Violet, Dark Green, and Gold.

The physical construction includes a side-mounted fingerprint sensor integrated into the power button, a dual-nano SIM tray, and stereo speakers. The chassis is certified with an IPX8 rating for dust and water resistance, rendering it capable of immersion in up to 1.5 meters of water for up to 30 minutes.

== Specifications ==
=== Hardware ===
The device is powered by the Qualcomm SM8475 Snapdragon 8+ Gen 1 4G chipset, built on a 4-nanometer process node. The octa-core central processing unit (CPU) configuration includes a single 3.19 GHz Cortex-X2 core, three 2.75 GHz Cortex-A710 cores, and four 2.0 GHz Cortex-A510 cores, paired with an Adreno 730 graphics processing unit (GPU). Due to trade restrictions, the platform is restricted to 4G network connectivity on global variants, whereas 5G network bands (SA/NSA) are restricted to the mainland Chinese models.

The Mate X3 comes equipped with 12 GB of RAM and is configurable with 256 GB, 512 GB, or 1 TB of UFS internal storage. Storage expansion is supported via Huawei's proprietary Nano Memory (NM) format up to an additional 256 GB, which utilizes a hybrid shared SIM slot.

The smartphone features two separate displays, both supporting active stylus inputs:

- Main Display: A flexible 7.85-inch foldable OLED panel with a 120 Hz refresh rate, capable of displaying 1 billion colors. It has a resolution of 2224 × 2496 pixels, yielding a pixel density of approximately 426 ppi and an 88.9% screen-to-body ratio.
- Cover Display: A 6.4-inch standard OLED panel featuring a 120 Hz refresh rate and a resolution of 1080 × 2504 pixels.

=== Battery and charging ===
Battery specifications differ by market distribution. The global release utilizes a 4800 mAh Lithium-Polymer (Li-Po) battery, while the domestic Chinese market version incorporates a higher-density 5060 mAh Silicon-Carbon (Si/C) Lithium-Ion battery. Both variants support 66W wired charging, 50W wireless charging, and 7.5W reverse wireless charging.

=== Connectivity ===
Connectivity capabilities include dual-band Wi-Fi 6 (802.11 a/b/g/n/ac/6), Bluetooth 5.2, Near Field Communication (NFC), and an infrared port. Location tracking is serviced via multi-band GPS, GLONASS, BDS, GALILEO, QZSS, and NavIC. The Chinese variant additionally features Beidou (BDS) satellite messaging capabilities. Wired transfer and display output are handled through a USB Type-C 3.1 interface supporting DisplayPort 1.2 and USB On-The-Go (OTG).

=== Camera ===
The main rear camera array is configured in a triple-lens system with an added color spectrum sensor and laser autofocus:

- Primary: A 50 megapixel (f/1.8, 23mm wide-angle lens) sensor with Phase Detection Autofocus (PDAF) and Optical Image Stabilization (OIS).
- Telephoto: A 12 megapixel (f/3.4, 125mm periscope telephoto lens) sensor capable of 5x optical zoom, equipped with PDAF and OIS.
- Ultrawide: A 13 megapixel (f/2.2, 13mm ultrawide lens) sensor featuring standard autofocus.

The main camera system supports video recording at 4K resolution and 1080p resolution at both 30 and 60 frames per second (fps), assisted by gyro-Electronic Image Stabilization (gyro-EIS).

For front-facing photography, the device employs two separate 8 megapixel (f/2.4, wide-angle) sensors: one embedded in a hole-punch cutout on the internal folding screen, and another on the external cover display. Both front cameras support HDR and video capture up to 4K or 1080p at 30 fps.

=== Software ===
The operating system running on the Huawei Mate X3 is market-dependent and lacks Google Play Services globally due to ongoing sanctions. The Chinese domestic variant ships with HarmonyOS 3.1, while international models run EMUI 13.1, built on top of the open-source Android base. Application distribution on all versions is handled via the Huawei AppGallery.

== Reception ==
=== Camera ===
PhoneArena reviewer Peter Kostadinov that in daylight conditions, the Mate X3's camera produces high-quality images characterized by accurate colors, strong image dynamics, and natural sharpness without excessive oversharpening. The camera software includes three color presets—Original (the default setting), Vivid, and Bright—which allow users to customize color rendering similarly to Apple's Photographic Styles.

=== Battery ===
During the test from PCMark10, tested by Hannah Cowton-Barnes from Tech Advisor, the device lasted 7 hours and 8 minutes. Reviewers indicated this performance was comparable to other book-style foldables, noting that real-world battery longevity improves when users alternate between the inner and outer displays.
