= Huawei Mate X5 =

Foldable high-end smartphone manufactured by Huawei

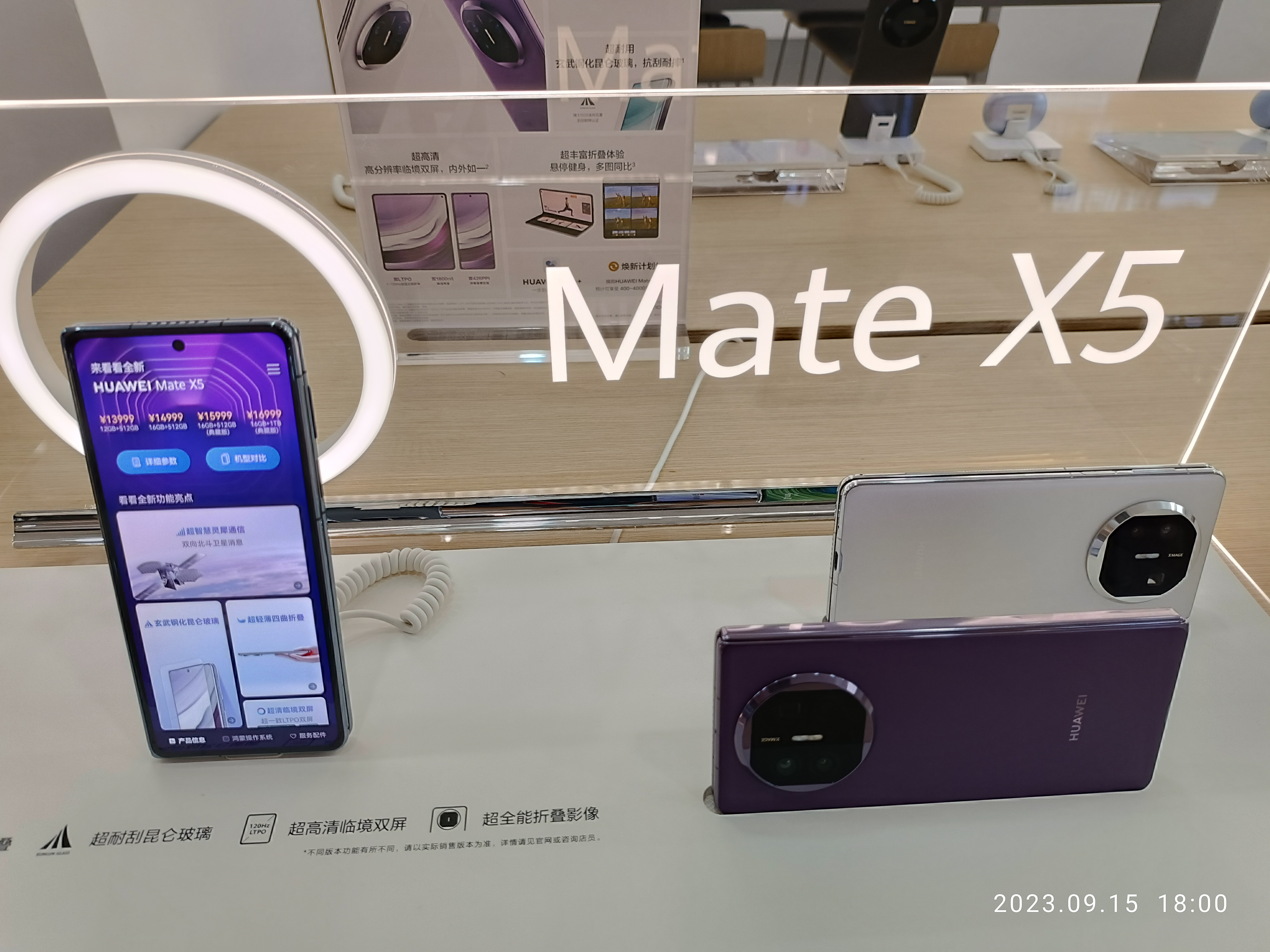
- Huawei Mate X5 (unfolded)
- Brand: Huawei
- Manufacturer: Huawei
- Series: Huawei Mate X series
- First released: September 8, 2023; 3 years ago
- Availability by region: September 16, 2023; 3 years ago (China only)
- Predecessor: Huawei Mate X3
- Successor: Huawei Mate X6
- Compatible networks: GSM, CDMA, HSPA, EVDO, LTE, 5G
- Colors: Black, White, Purple, Dark Green, Gold
- Dimensions: Unfolded: 156.9 mm × 141.5 mm × 5.3 mm Folded: 156.9 mm × 72.4 mm × 11.1 mm
- Weight: 243 g (9 oz) or 245 g
- Operating system: HarmonyOS 4.0 (China); EMUI (Europe)
- System-on-chip: Kirin 9000S (7 nm)
- CPU: Octa-core (1x2.62 GHz Taishan Big & 3x2.15 GHz Taishan Mid & 4x1.53GHz Cortex-A510)
- GPU: Maleoon 910 MP4
- Memory: 12 GB or 16 GB RAM
- Storage: 256 GB, 512 GB, or 1 TB UFS 3.1
- Removable storage: Nano Memory up to 256 GB (uses shared SIM slot)
- Battery: 5,060 mAh Si/C Li-Ion (non-removable)
- Charging: 66W wired, 50W wireless, 7.5W reverse wireless
- Rear camera: Triple: • 50 MP, f/1.8, 23mm (wide), PDAF, OIS • 12 MP, f/3.4, 125mm (periscope telephoto), PDAF, OIS, 5x optical zoom • 13 MP, f/2.2, 13mm (ultrawide), AF; Features: Laser AF, color spectrum sensor, LED flash, panorama, HDR; Video: 4K@30/60fps, 1080p@30/60fps, gyro-EIS
- Front camera: Main: 8 MP, f/2.4 (wide); Cover: 8 MP, f/2.4 (wide); Video: 4K@30fps, 1080p@30fps
- Display: Main: 7.85 in (199 mm) Foldable OLED, 120Hz; 2224 × 2496 pixels (~426 ppi); Cover: 6.4 in (163 mm) OLED, 120Hz; 1080 × 2504 pixels
- Sound: Stereo loudspeakers, no 3.5mm jack
- Connectivity: Wi-Fi 802.11 a/b/g/n/ac/6 (dual-band, Wi-Fi Direct); Bluetooth 5.2 (A2DP, LE); NFC, Infrared port, USB Type-C 3.1 (DisplayPort 1.2, OTG)
- Model: ALT-AL10

The Huawei Mate X5 is a flagship, foldable Android smartphone designed and manufactured by Huawei. It was announced on September 8, 2023, and released in Chinese markets 8 days later, alongside Huawei Mate 60 Pro+. It was the successor of the Huawei Mate X3 and was succeeded by the Huawei Mate X6 on November 26, 2024. The Mate X5 shares the same display, same camera module, same form factor, and a different processor than the Mate X3.

Despite ongoing U.S. trade restrictions preventing Huawei from procuring 5G-capable semiconductors from American firms such as Qualcomm, both the Mate X5 and Mate 60 Pro attracted significant attention after demonstrating 5G-level network speeds.

In 2024, the Mate X5 gained popularity and was marked to be the best-selling phone in Chinese markets, surpassing Huawei Pocket 2 with 28.1% of sales.

== Design ==
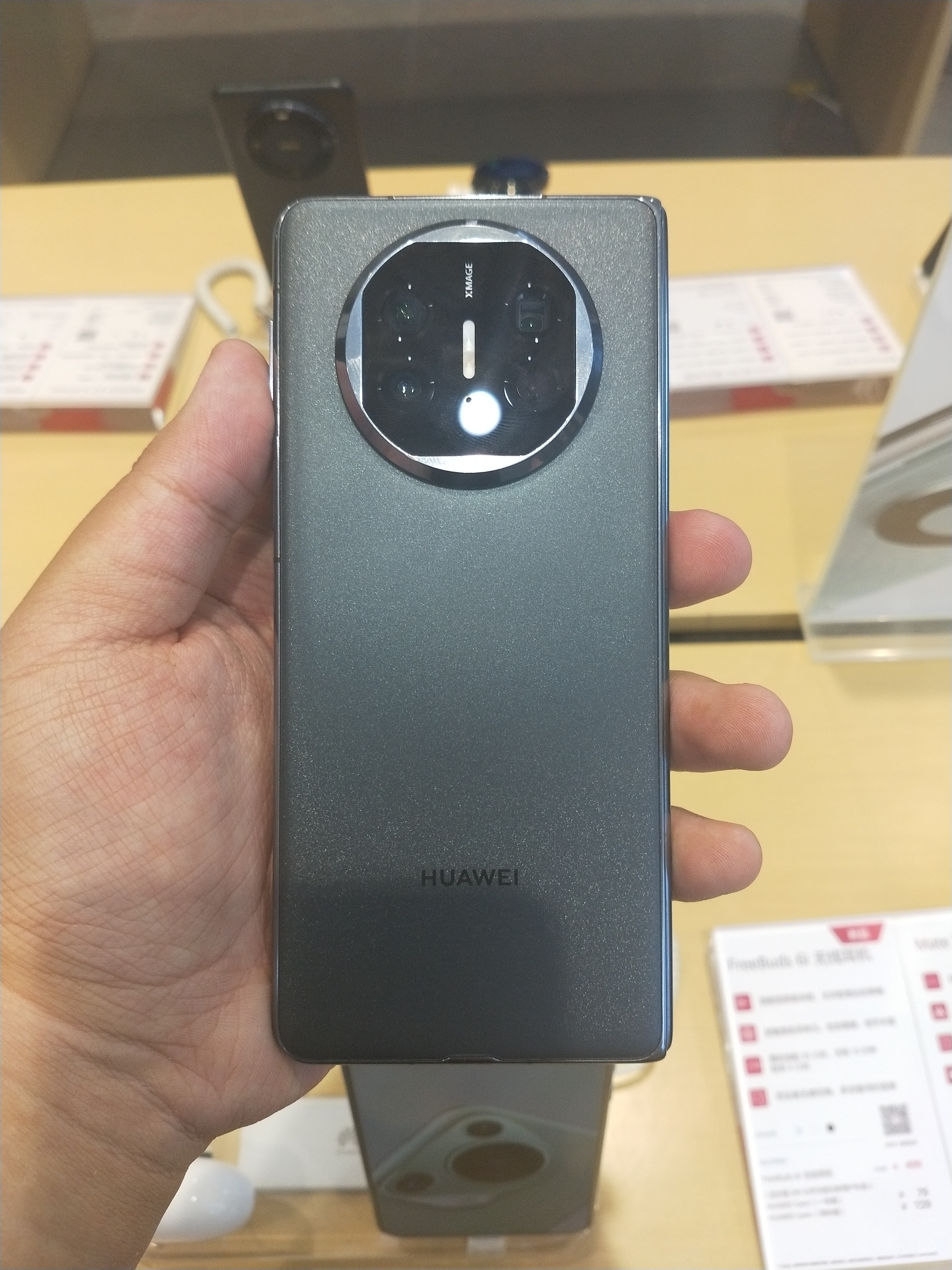
The rear panel of the Mate X5, revealing the circular camera module at the top centre Rear side, unfolded

Just like its predecessor, the Huawei Mate X5 features an inward-folding form factor. Its physical dimensions vary depending on its state:

- Unfolded: 156.9 mm (height) × 141.5 mm (width) × 5.3 mm (thickness)
- Folded: 156.9 mm (height) × 72.4 mm (width) × 11.1 mm (thickness)

The device has a structural layout composed of an aluminum frame and is available with either a glass back or an eco-leather back. Depending on the rear material used, the weight of the phone ranges between 243 grams and 245 grams. The device is engineered with an IPX8 rating, providing dust and water resistance capable of withstanding immersion in water up to 1.5 meters for 30 minutes. The rear panel features a redesigned, centrally placed camera island holding a triple-lens setup. On the front, the external cover display uses Huawei's proprietary Kunlun Glass for enhanced scratch and drop protection. Both the internal and external displays support stylus input. The device was launched in five color variants: Black, White, Purple (Phantom Purple), Dark Green (Green Mountain), and Gold.

== Specifications ==
=== Hardware ===
The Huawei Mate X5 is powered by an in-house Kirin 9000S chipset built on a 7-nanometer process technology. The octa-core central processing unit (CPU) consists of one 2.62 GHz Taishan Big core, three 2.15 GHz Taishan Mid cores, and four 1.53 GHz Cortex-A510 efficiency cores. Graphics are handled by a Maleoon 910 MP4 graphics processing unit (GPU).

The device is equipped with Huawei's upgraded "Lingxi" antenna system, utilizing dual-mode tuning technology and an artificial intelligence (AI) algorithm to dynamically adjust network reception for improved connectivity.

=== Storage and memory ===
The smartphone lacks a standard microSD slot but supports expandable storage of up to 256GB using Huawei's proprietary Nano Memory (NM) card, which occupies a shared dual-SIM slot. Internal storage and RAM configurations include:

- 256 GB storage / 12 GB RAM
- 512 GB storage / 12 GB RAM
- 512 GB storage / 16 GB RAM
- 1 TB storage / 16 GB RAM

The flash storage operates on the UFS 3.1 protocol.

=== Displays ===
The device features dual displays depening on the condition:

- Main Display (Internal): A 7.85-inch foldable flexible OLED display with a resolution of 2224 × 2496 pixels, yielding a pixel density of approximately 426 ppi. It supports 1 billion colors, a 120 Hz refresh rate, and 1440 Hz high-frequency PWM dimming. (The Collector's Edition introduces an adaptive 1–120 Hz LTPO refresh rate on the internal panel).
- Cover Display (External): A 6.4-inch LTPO OLED 3D quad-curved display with a resolution of 1080 × 2504 pixels. It features a 1–120 Hz adaptive refresh rate and 1440 Hz PWM dimming.

=== Camera ===
The rear triple-camera module consists of:

- 50 MP wide angle sensor with an f/1.8 aperture, 23mm equivalent focal length, Phase Detection Autofocus (PDAF), and Optical Image Stabilization (OIS)
- 12 MP telephoto sensor with an f/3.4 aperture, 125mm equivalent focal length, PDAF, OIS, and 5× optical zoom capability.
- 13 MP ultrawide sensor with an f/2.2 aperture, 13mm equivalent focal length, and autofocus support

The rear camera array is assisted by a Laser Autofocus module and a color spectrum sensor. Video recording supports resolutions up to 4K at 30 or 60 frames per second (fps), backed by gyro-electronic image stabilization (gyro-EIS).

=== Battery and charging ===
The phone is powered by a 5060 mAh Silicon-Carbon (Si/C) battery. It supports 66W wired SuperCharge, 50W wireless charging, and 7.5W reverse wireless charging.

The device features three cameras, 50MP main with f/1.8 aperture, a 13MP f/2.2 ultra wide and a 12MP f/3.4 periscope lens.

=== Connectivity and software ===
The Mate X5 supports global network connectivity across GSM, CDMA, HSPA, EVDO, LTE, and 5G bands. In mainland China, it supports two-way BeiDou Satellite Calling and Messaging. Other connectivity features include Wi-Fi 6 (802.11 a/b/g/n/ac/6), Bluetooth 5.2 (supporting low energy, AAC, LDAC, and L2HC high-definition audio codecs), Near Field Communication (NFC), and an infrared port. Physical connectivity is managed via a USB Type-C 3.1 port with DisplayPort 1.2 support.

Biometric authentication is handled via a side-mounted fingerprint sensor built into the power button. Other sensors include an accelerometer, gyroscope, proximity sensor, compass, barometer, and altimeter.

The Mate X5 ships with HarmonyOS 4.0 for Chinese models and EMUI for European models. Due to ongoing United States trade restrictions, the device lacks Google Play Services out of the box.

Huawei Mate X5
OS Update history
Pre-installed	1st	2nd	3rd
Harmony OS 4.0 (China) EMUI (Europe)	Harmony OS 5.1 July 2025	Harmony OS 6.0 October 2025 (Public Beta)	Harmony OS 6.1 April 2026
