= Huawei Nova 5T =

2019 Huawei mid-range smartphone

- Manufacturer: Huawei
- Type: Smartphone
- Series: Huawei Nova
- First released: August 2019
- Compatible networks: 2G (EDGE); 3G (WCDMA/UMTS); 4G (LTE)
- Colors: Black, Crush Blue, Midsummer Purple, Crush Green
- Dimensions: 154.25×73.97×7.87 mm (6.073×2.912×0.310 in)
- Weight: 174 g (6 oz)
- Operating system: Android 9.0, EMUI 9.1
- CPU: Huawei Kirin 980
- Memory: 6 GB RAM
- Storage: 128 GB
- Removable storage: No support
- SIM: Duo Nano-SIM
- Battery: 3750 mAh
- Rear camera: Main: 48 MP (f/1.8) + 16 MP (f/2.2) + 2 MP (f/2.4) + 2 MP (f/2.4); Stereo sound Front: 32 MP; Recording capability: 4K@30fps or 1080p@30/60fps with gyro-EIS
- Front camera: 32 MP, f/2.0, 26mm (wide), 1/2.8", 0.8µm with HDR; Recording capability: 1080p@30fps with gyro-EIS
- Display: 6.26" LCD; 2340 x 1080 (Full HD+)
- Sound: Loudspeaker; 32-bit/192kHz audio
- Connectivity: Wi-Fi 802.11 a/b/g/n/ac, MIMO, 2.4/5 GHz; Bluetooth 5.0; NFC
- Data inputs: Multi-touch sensor
- Other: Light sensor Gyroscope; Compass; Proximity sensor Fingerprint sensor

The Huawei Nova 5T is a mid-range smartphone developed and manufactured by Huawei. It was introduced in August 2019.

It was one of Huawei top mid-range smartphone due to its multi-color gradient (Crush Blue and Midsummer Purple only) and quad-camera setup.

== Availability and pricing ==
The initial global release was to be on August 25, 2019. Announcement from HUAWEI said that this smartphone will be available in South Africa along with other Huawei devices. In the Philippines, pre-orders start on September 6 to 13, with free Bluetooth speakers and 365-day access to iflixVIP and a price of PHP 18,990.

Sales start in Madrid, Spain on October 10, 2019, and later to be released in Germany. Also on November 22, 2019, sales in Ukraine begin.

== Technical specifications ==
=== Hardware ===
The smartphone is powered by the Huawei Kirin 980 Octa-core. The processor consists of octa-cores with 2 Cortex-A76 cores (2.6 GHz), 2 Cortex-A76 cores (1.92 GHz), and 4 Cortex-A55 cores (1.8 GHz). It was also powered by the Mali-G76 720 MHz.

The Nova 5T features a 6.26" IPS LCD FullView display with a resolution of 2340 × 1080 (Full HD+), a punch hole and a 19.5:9 ratio. It also has a 91.7% of screen-to-body ratio.

It has 128 GB of internal storage and 6 GB of RAM.

It was installed with a non-removable 3750 mAh battery with 22.5W Huawei SuperCharge fast charging, which would take about 30 minutes to reach 50%.

The Nova 5T contains 4 camera lens in the rear side:

- 48 MP (f/1.8) with Sony IMX586 sensor and AI stabilization
- 16 MP (f/2.2) wide-angle camera with distortion correction support
- 2 MP (f/2.4) for creating digital bokeh
- 2 MP (f/2.4) for macro photography

Video recordings with 1080 @ 30-60fps and 4K @ 30fps are supported, while the front only supports 1080 @ 30fps.

The Nova 5T also received a 32 MP (f/2.0) front camera with fixed focal length support.

=== Software ===
The Huawei Nova runs on the Android 9.0 mobile operating system with the EMUI 9.1 user interface skin and also supports Google apps.

It received multiple software and security updates:

Software and security updates (2019–2020)
Date	UI	Mobile operating system	Notes
August 2019 (pre-installed)	EMUI 9.1	Android 9 Pie	
October 2019	EMUI 10 beta	Android 10	Live update in the Philippines
1st quarter of 2020	EMUI 10	Android 10	
July to August 2020	EMUI 10.1	Android 10	with security update (Ghana)
September 2020	EMUI 11	Android 10	

== Reception ==
UnboxPH reports that the Crush Blue and Midsummer Purple variants are "stunningly beautiful" due to the multi-layered 3D-effect projection that shifts from the phone's reflection from the light.

In terms of gaming test, Asphalt 9, MLBB and PUBG Mobile had full stability with 30-60 frames per second respectively. Also from RevuPH, phones with the same Sony IMX586 sensor like the Oppo Reno 10X Zoon Edition and the OnePlus 7 Pro are capable for photography with the main camera.
