= Huawei Mate 80 =

Mobile phone

Huawei Mate 80 Huawei Mate 80 Pro Huawei Mate 80 Pro Max Huawei Mate 80 RS Ultimate Design
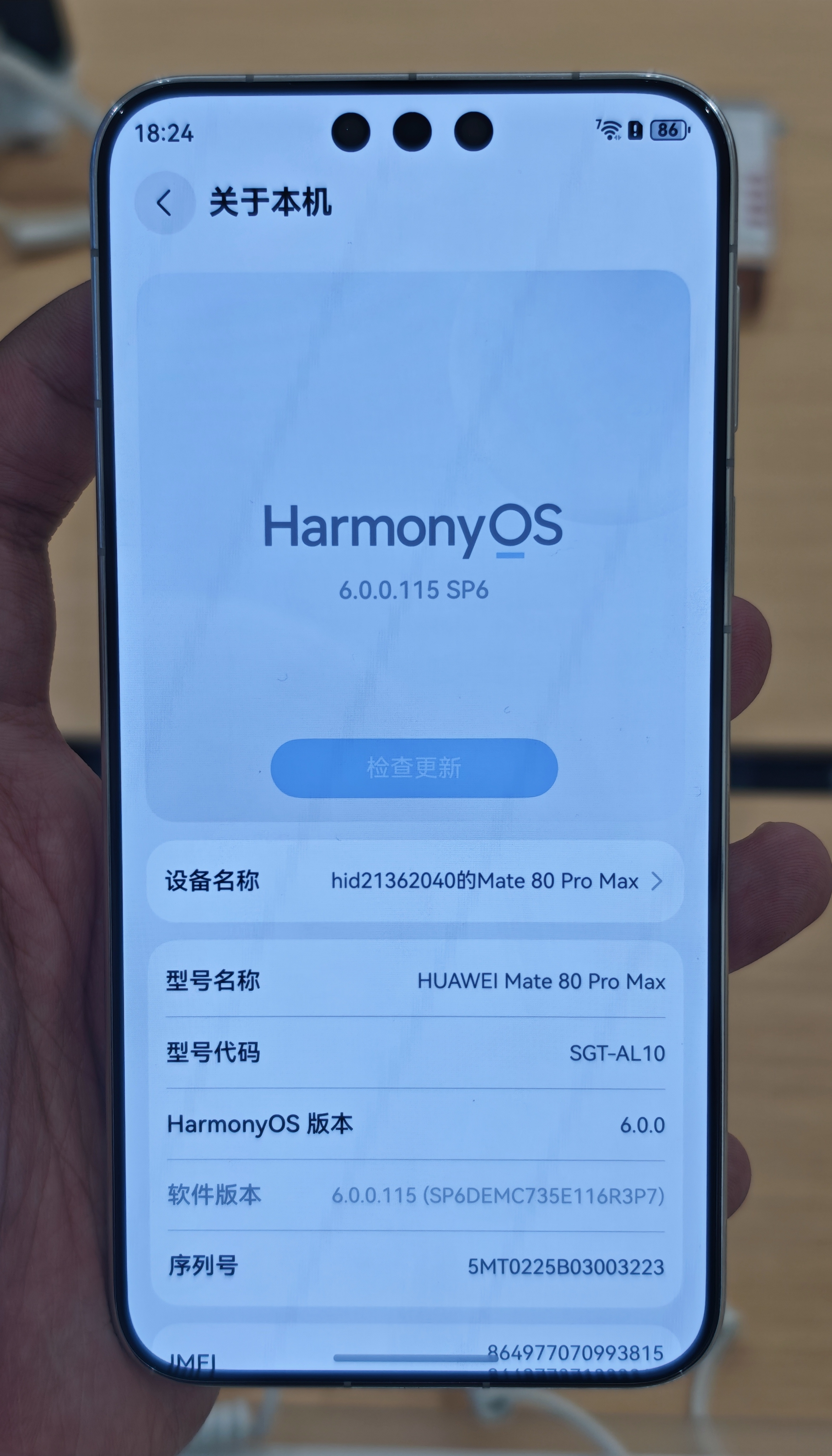
- HUAWEI Mate 80 Pro Max
- Manufacturer: Huawei
- Type: Smartphone
- Series: Huawei Mate
- First released: November 25, 2025
- Predecessor: Huawei Mate 70
- Compatible networks: GSM/ CDMA/ HSPA / CDMA2000/ LTE
- Form factor: Slate
- Operating system: HarmonyOS 6
- System-on-chip: Kirin 9020 (Mate 80); Kirin 9030 (Mate 80 Pro, 12GB); Kirin 9030 Pro (Mate 80 Pro, 16GB/Pro Max/RS Ultimate Design)
- SIM: Dual SIM (Nano-SIM)
- Website: Mate 80 Pro Max; Mate 80; Mate 80 Pro

Huawei Mate 80 (Chinese: HUAWEI Mate 80系列, stylized as HUAWEI Mate80) is a series of flagship smartphones manufactured by Huawei and released on the market in China in November 2025. The base model has 3D facial recognition. It features a 5,750 mAh battery, a 50 MP camera, up to 512 GB storage, 16 GB RAM and Beidou satellite connectivity.

The Mate 80 series comprises four models: Mate 80, Mate 80 Pro, Mate 80 Pro Max, and Mate 80 RS.

== Specifications ==
=== Hardware ===
==== Chipset ====
The Mate 80 Pro (16 GB RAM version), Mate 80 Pro Max and Mate 80 RS Ultimate Design (Chinese: HUAWEI Mate 80 RS 非凡大师) uses the Kirin 9030 Pro as SOC; Mate 80 Pro (12 GB RAM version) uses the Kirin 9030 and Mate 80 Standard version uses the Kirin 9020.

Another tech blogger has claimed that the Kirin 9030 is a 9-core processor with two 2.75 GHz high-performance cores, six 2.27 GHz mid-performance cores, and four 1.72 GHz efficiency cores. The Kirin 9030 Pro maintains the same number of cores as the Kirin 9030, but the Kirin 9030 has 12 threads, Kirin 9030 Pro has 14 threads.

==== Display ====
The smartphone has a 6.75-inch LTPO OLED display with a 120 Hz refresh rate and second generation Kunlun glass. The screen incorporates a 3D face recognition sensor, while the fingerprint scanner has been placed at the side of the phone.

==== Battery ====
The base model Mate 80 and the Pro have a 5,750 mAh battery, while the Pro Max and the RS models feature a 6,000 mAh battery.

==== Storage ====
The base Mate 80 and the Pro models have 256 GB, 512 GB models, also the Pro, Pro Max and RS have 1 TB model; the base, Pro, Pro Max featuring 12 GB or 16 GB RAM. Moreover, the RS support 20 GB RAM.

== See also ==
- List of Huawei products
- Huawei Mate
