= Honor N series =

Line of smartphones by Honor

- Developer: Huawei (2011–2020); Honor (2021–present)
- Type: Smartphones
- Released: 2011; 15 years ago
- Operating system: Android
- Related: Honor A series Honor C series Honor S series Honor X series

The Honor N series is a line of Android-based smartphones produced by Honor.

== Phones ==
- Huawei U8860 Honor
- Honor 2
- Honor 3
- Honor 5
- Honor 6
  - Honor 6 Plus
- Honor 7
- Honor 8
  - Honor 8 Pro
  - Honor 8 Smart
- Honor 9
- Honor 10
  - Honor 10 GT
- Honor 20
  - Honor 20 Pro
- Honor 30
  - Honor 30 Pro
  - Honor 30 Pro+
- Honor 50
  - Honor 50 Pro
  - Honor 50 SE
  - Honor 50 Lite
- Honor 60
  - Honor 60 Pro
  - Honor 60 SE
- Honor 70
  - Honor 70 Pro
  - Honor 70 Pro+
  - Honor 70 Lite
- Honor 80
  - Honor 80 Pro
  - Honor 80 Pro Flat
  - Honor 80 SE
  - Honor 80 GT
- Honor 90
  - Honor 90 Pro
  - Honor 90 GT
  - Honor 90 Lite
- Honor 100
  - Honor 100 Pro
- Honor 200
  - Honor 200 Pro
  - Honor 200 Lite
  - Honor 200 Smart
- Honor 300
  - Honor 300 Pro
  - Honor 300 Ultra
- Honor 400
  - Honor 400 Pro
  - Honor 400 Lite
  - Honor 400 Smart
- Honor 500
  - Honor 500 Pro
- Honor 600
  - Honor 600 Pro
  - Honor 600 Lite
  - Honor 600 Smart

== See also ==
- Huawei Pura
- Huawei Mate
