= Honor X series =

Line of smartphones and tablet computers

- Developer: Huawei (2013–2020); Honor (2021–present)
- Type: Smartphones; Tablet computers
- Released: December 16, 2013; 12 years ago
- Operating system: Android
- Predecessor: Honor A series Honor C series Honor S series
- Related: Honor N series

The Honor X (formerly Huawei Honor X) series is a line of Android-based smartphones and tablet computers produced by Honor.

== Phones ==
Honor X series
| 2013 | Huawei Honor 3X |
| 2014 | Huawei Honor 3X Pro |
| 2014 | Honor 4X |
| 2015 | Honor 5X |
| 2016 | Honor 6X |
| 2017 | Honor 7X |
| 2018 | Honor 8X/8X Max |
| 2019 | Honor 9X/9X Pro |
| 2020 | Honor 9X Lite |
| 2020 | Honor X10 5G/X10 Max 5G |
| 2020 | Honor 10X Lite |
| 2021 | Honor X20/X20 SE |
| 2021 | Honor X30/X30i/X30 Max |
| 2022 | Honor X6/X7/X8 5G/X8/X9/X9 5G |
| 2022 | Honor X40/X40i/X40 GT |
| 2023 | Honor X6a/X7a/X8a/X9a |
| 2023 | Honor X5/X5 Plus |
| 2023 | Honor X50/X50i/X50i+/X50 Pro |
| 2023 | Honor X40 GT Racing Edition |
| 2023 | Honor X7b/X8b/X9b |
| 2024 | Honor X50 GT |
| 2024 | Honor X5b/X5b Plus/X6b/X7b/X7b 5G |
| 2024 | Honor X60/X60i/X60 Pro |
| 2024 | Honor X7c/X8c/X9c/X9c Smart |
| 2025 | Honor X6b 5G |
| 2025 | Honor X5c/X5c Plus/X6c/X7c 5G/X8c |
| 2025 | Honor X7d/X7d 5G/X8d/X9d |
| 2025 | Honor X70/X70i |
| 2025 | Honor X60 GT |

=== Huawei Honor 3X and Honor 3X Pro ===
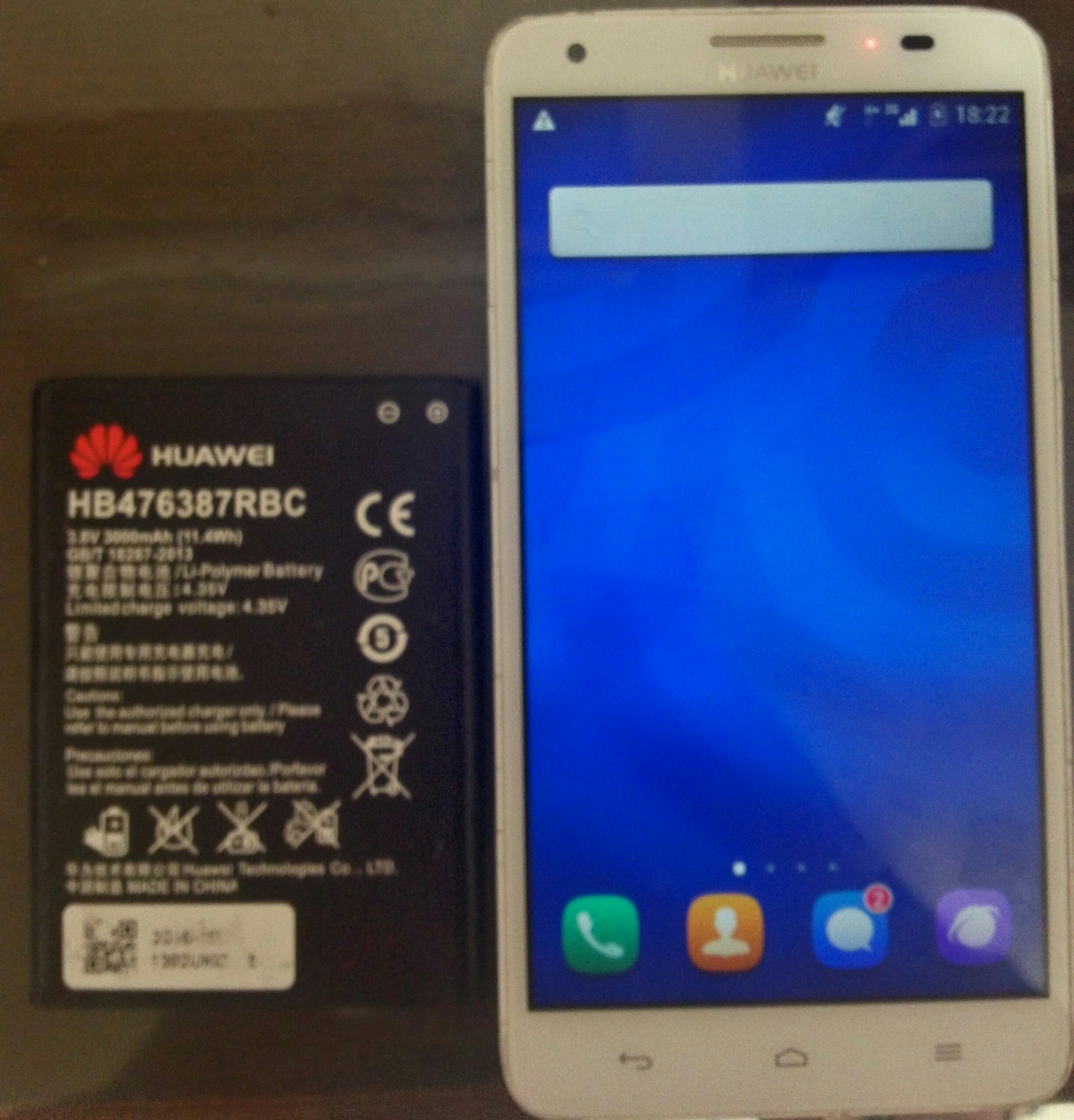
Huawei Honor 3X and its battery

The Huawei Honor 3X was released in December 2013 and is the first smartphone in the Honor X series. It features a big 5.5-inch IPS panel with a 720p resolution, a MediaTek MT6592 SoC with an octa-core CPU and a user-replaceable 3000 mAh battery. In May 2014, Huawei introduced the Huawei Honor 3X Pro with a 1080p display and a bigger storage capacity. In some regions, the Huawei Honor 3X is known as the Huawei Ascend G750.

=== Honor 4X ===
The Honor 4X (known as the Honor Play 4X in China) was released in October 2014 and is the first smartphone in the Honor X series to be equipped with a 64-bit CPU. Compared to the predecessor, the Honor 4X features more advanced SoC (HiSilicon Kirin 620 or Qualcomm Snapdragon 410), LTE support and non-removable battery. In some regions, the Honor 4X was sold as the Huawei G Play.

=== Honor 5X ===
The Honor 5X was first announced in late 2015. It features an aluminum body with plastic strips on the top and bottom of the back and a Qualcomm Snapdragon 616 SoC. The design of the back is similar to the Honor 7. In some regions, the Honor 5X is also known as the Huawei GR5.

=== Honor 6X ===
The Huawei Honor 6X was originally announced in October 2016.

- Storage: 32 or 64 GB
- RAM: 3 or 4 GB
- Battery: 3340 mAh

In some regions, the Honor 5X is also known as the Huawei GR5 2017 and Huawei Mate 9 lite.

=== Honor 7X ===
The Huawei Honor 7X was first announced in China in October 2017. In December 2017, it was announced for international markets. In the US, the Honor 7X was sold as the Huawei Mate SE.

Model
Honor 8X
Honor 9X
Honor 9X Pro
Honor X10 5G

== Tablets ==
Honor (Pad) X series
| 2014 | Huawei Honor X1 |
| 2015 | Huawei Honor X2 |
2016
2017
2018
2019
| 2020 | Honor Pad X6 |
| 2021 | Honor Pad X7 |
| 2022 | Honor Pad X8/X8 Lite |
| 2023 | Honor Pad X8 Pro |
| 2023 | Honor Pad X9 |
| 2024 | Honor Pad X8a |
| 2025 | Honor Pad X7 (2025) |

== See also ==
- Huawei Pura
- Huawei Mate
