= Huawei Honor 3X =

Android midrange smartphone

Huawei Honor 3X (Huawei Ascend G750) Huawei Honor 3X Pro
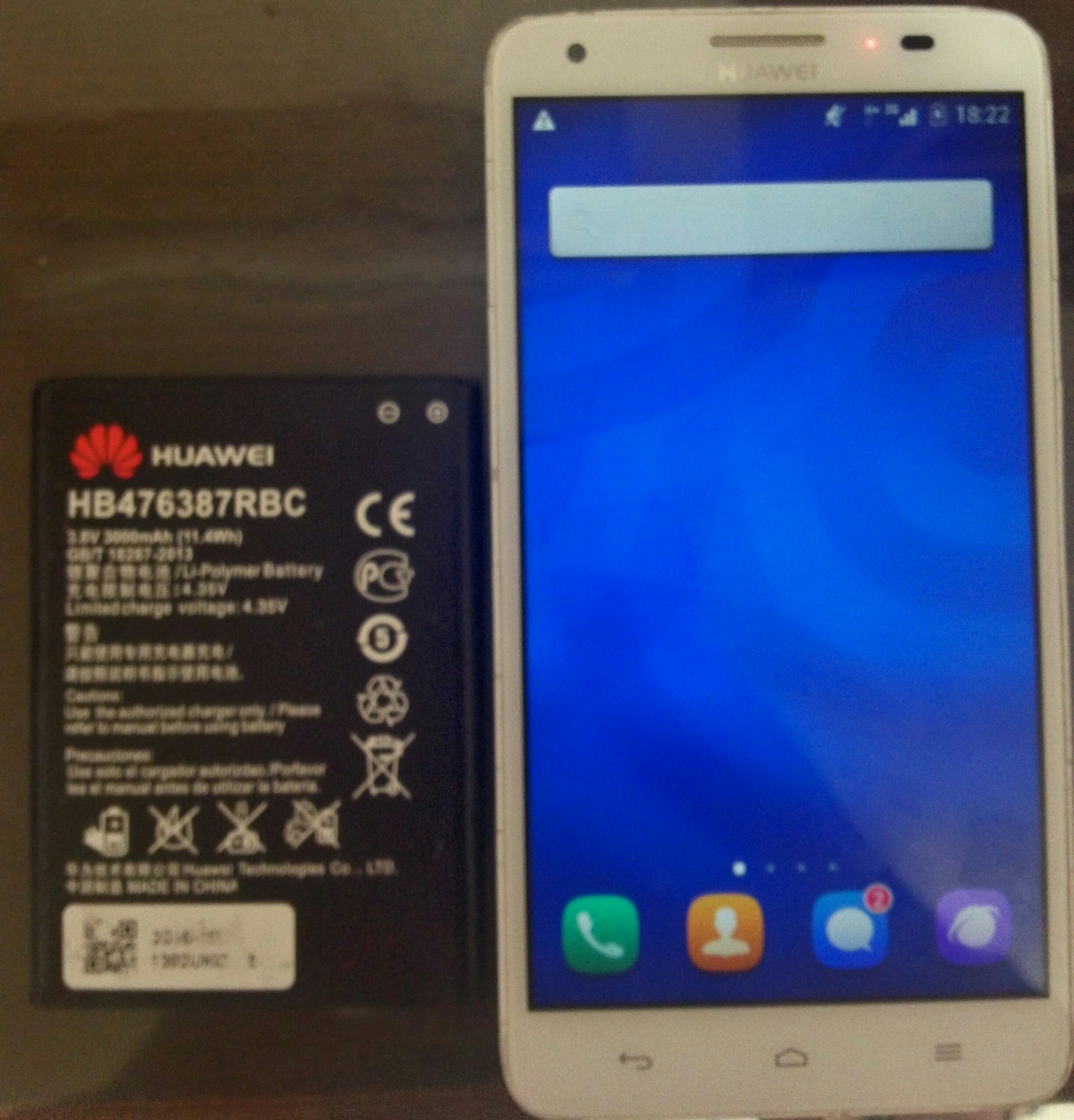
- Manufacturer: Huawei
- Type: Phablet
- Series: Honor X/Ascend G
- First released: Honor 3X: December 16, 2013; 12 years ago Honor 3X Pro: May 2014; 12 years ago Ascend G750: March 2014; 12 years ago
- Successor: Honor 4X
- Related: Huawei Honor 3 Huawei Honor 3C
- Compatible networks: (GSM/HSPA); 2G: GSM GSM850, GSM900, DCS1800, PCS1900; 3G UMTS: B1(2100), B8(900)
- Form factor: Slate
- Colors: Black, white
- Dimensions: 149.5 mm (5.89 in) H 77.4 mm (3.05 in) W 8.9 mm (0.35 in) D
- Weight: 162 g (5.7 oz)
- Operating system: Original: Android 4.2.2 "Jelly Bean" with Emotion UI 2.0; Current: Android 4.4.2 "KitKat" with EMUI 3.0
- System-on-chip: MediaTek MT6592 (28 nm)
- CPU: Octa-core 1.7 GHz Cortex-A7
- GPU: Mali-G450 MP4
- Memory: 2 GB RAM
- Storage: Honor 3X: 8/16 GB; Honor 3X Pro: 32 GB; Ascend G750: 8 GB
- Removable storage: microSDHC up to 32 GB
- SIM: Dual SIM (Mini-SIM + Micro-SIM)
- Battery: Removable, Li-Po 3000 mAh
- Rear camera: 13 MP, AF; LED flash Video: 1080p@30fps
- Front camera: 5 MP
- Display: All models: IPS LCD 5.5 in (140 mm), 16:9; Honor 3X/Ascend G750: 720 × 1280 pixels (267 ppi); Honor 3X Pro: 1080 × 1920 pixels (401 ppi)
- Sound: Front earpiece, rear mono speaker
- Connectivity: List: Wi-Fi: 802.11 b/g/n (2.4 GHz) (Wi-Fi Direct); GPS/GLONASS; Bluetooth 4.0 (A2DP); Micro USB 2.0; 3.5 mm headphone jack
- Model: Honor 3X: G750-T00, G750-U00; Honor 3X Pro: G750-T20; Ascend G750: G750-T00

The Huawei Honor 3X and Huawei Honor 3X Pro are Android mid-range phablets produced by Huawei, as a part of the Honor X series. The Honor 3X was released in December 2013, while the Honor 3X Pro was released in May 2014. The main difference between the base and Pro model is a display resolution and storage capacity. In some regions, the Honor 3X was sold as the Huawei Ascend G750.

== Design ==
The front is made of glass, while the frame and back are made of plastic.

On the bottom of the smartphones, there is the microUSB port and a microphone, while on the top, there is the 3.5 mm audio jack. On the right, there is the volume rocker and the power button. On the front, there is the screen with the logo, an earpiece speaker, a proximity/ambient light sensor and a front-facing camera above it, and three touch-sensitive navigation buttons below the display. On the back, there is the logo, a rear-facing camera, an LED flash, an additional microphone, and a speaker. Under the removable back, panel the user can find dual SIM slot for Mini-SIM and Micro-SIM with memory card slot.

The smartphones were available in black and white color options.

== Specifications ==
=== Hardware ===
The smartphones are equipped with the MediaTek MT6592 SoC, which features an octa-core CPU and a Mali-450MP4 GPU. The Honor 3X came with 8 GB or 16 GB of storage, while the Honor 3X Pro came with 32 GB of storage. The storage can be expanded by microSD card up to 32 GB. Both phones feature 2 GB of RAM.

The smartphones are connectable using Bluetooth and Wi-Fi.

The smartphones feature a 13 MP rear-facing camera with autofocus and a 5 MP front-facing camera.

Both the Honor 3X and Honor 3X Pro feature a 5.5-inch IPS LCD with a 16:9 aspect ratio. The display of the Honor 3X has an HD (720 × 1280) resolution and a 267 ppi pixel density, while the display of the Honor 3X has a Full HD (1080 × 1920) resolution and a 401 ppi pixel density.

=== Software ===
The smartphones come out of box with Emotion UI 2.0 based Android 4.2.2 "Jelly Bean". Later, the devices were updated to EMUI 3.0 based on Android 4.4.2 "KitKat".
