= Huawei Honor 4C =

Smartphone branded by Honor

Huawei Honor 4C (Huawei G Play Mini)
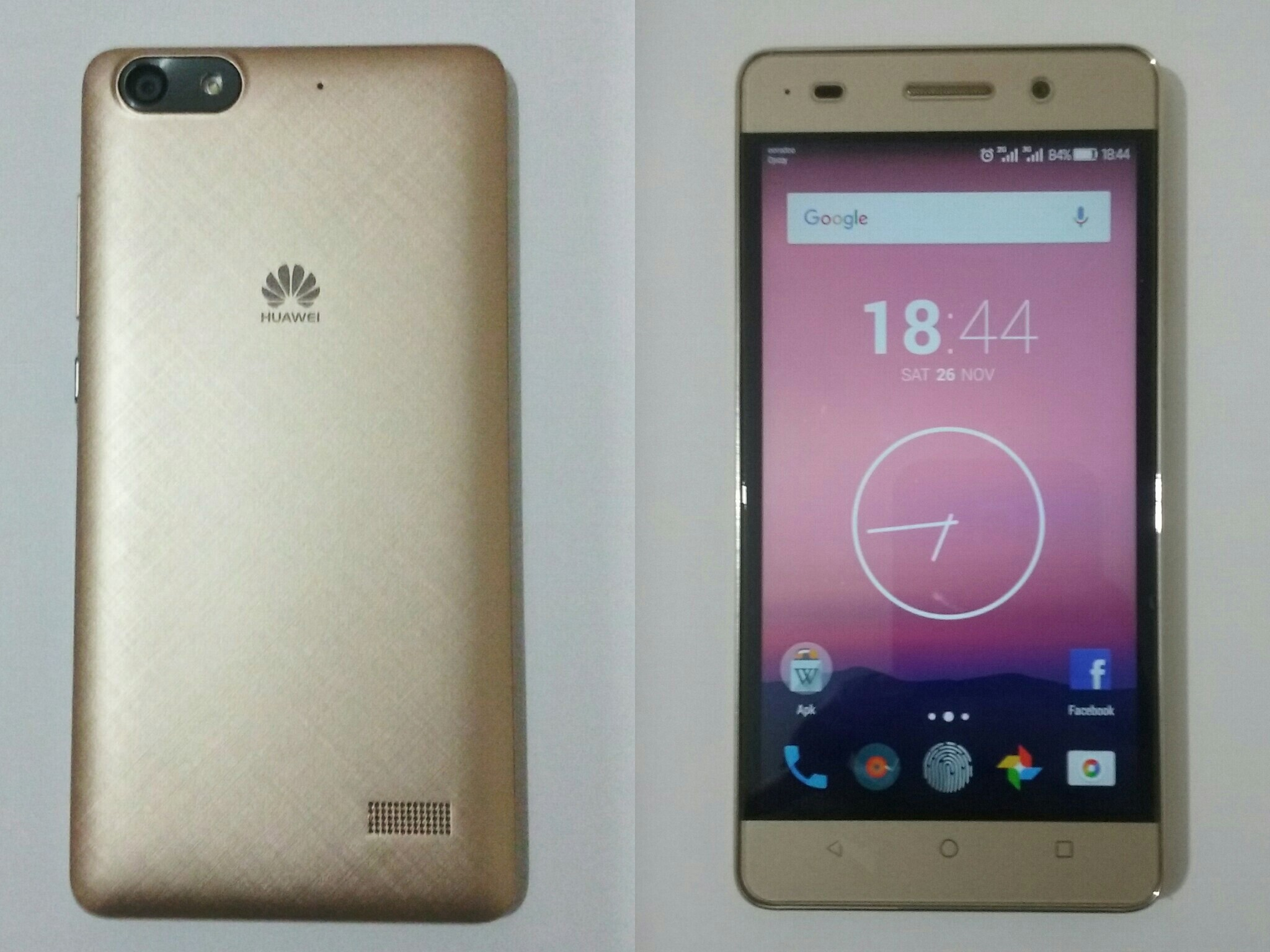
- Huawei G Play Mini
- Manufacturer: Huawei
- Type: Smartphone
- Series: Huawei Honor
- First released: April 2015
- Predecessor: Huawei Honor 3C
- Successor: Huawei Honor 5c
- Compatible networks: GSM: 850 / 900 / 1800 / 1900 (SIM 1 & SIM 2); HSDPA: 900 / 2100 (CHM-U01)
- Form factor: Slate
- Colors: White, Black, Gold, Blue, Pink
- Dimensions: 143.3 x 71.9 x 8.8 mm (5.64 x 2.83 x 0.35 in)
- Weight: 5.71 oz (162 g)
- Operating system: Initial: Android 4.4.2 KitKat; Current: Android 6.0 Marshmallow
- System-on-chip: Kirin 620 (28 nm)
- CPU: 1.2 GHz Cortex-A53, octa-core
- GPU: Mali-450MP4
- Memory: 2 GB RAM
- Storage: 8 GB
- Removable storage: microSDHC
- SIM: Dual SIM (Micro-SIM, dual stand-by)
- Battery: Li-ion 2550 mAh (non-revomable)
- Rear camera: Single; 13MP (f/2.0) with AF; Video up to 1080p@30fps
- Front camera: Single; 5MP; Video up to 720p
- Display: 5.0" IPS LCD; 720 x 1280 px (16:9, 294 ppi)
- Connectivity: GLONASS
- Data inputs: Accelerometer; Proximity sensor; Compass

The Honor 4C (also known as Huawei G Play Mini) is a low-end Android smartphone branded by Honor, a sub-brand of Huawei. It was released in April 2015. It is the second low-end phone of Huawei's subrand Honor.

In the Philippines, the 4C is also launched in May 2015 along the Honor 6 Plus and the Honor 4X.

== Specifications ==
The Honor 4C and Huawei G Play Mini had a 5.0-inch liquid crystal display and runs initially on Android 4.4.2 and on updated to Android 6 Marshmallow, with the EMUI 3.0 UI. It is also the third phone by Honor which uses HiSilicon Kirin chipset, which is powered by 64-bit Kirin 620. with the 1.2 GHz Cortex-A53 octa-core. Both smartphones are powered by the Mali-450MP4 GPU.

The camera features a main 13MP (f/2.0) module with AF and a 5MP front camera.

The phone has 2 GB of RAM, 8 gigabytes of internal storage and comes with network band standards:

- GSM: 850 / 900 / 1800 / 1900 (SIM 1 & SIM 2)
- HSDPA: 900 / 2100 (CHM-U01)
