= Proximity bias =

Cognitive bias preferring things close in space and time

Proximity bias refers to the cognitive bias that people have a preference for things that are close in time and space. The common proverb, out of sight, out of mind, is a reflection of proximity bias. More broadly, this tendency influences judgements, decisions, and interpersonal relationships, leading individuals to favour people, objects, and outcomes that are physically near to them.

The bias intersects with other cognitive biases rooted in a preference for the familiar. Related phenomena include the mere exposure effect, in which repeated exposure increases liking, and in-group favouritism, the tendency to favour one's own social group over others. The bias is also closely related to the proximity principle, a phenomenon in social psychology whereby individuals are more likely to form interpersonal relationships with those who are physically nearby. While the proximity principle concerns relationship formation, proximity bias extends this tendency to judgements of probability and decision-making more broadly.

== Origin and theoretical background ==
For an ultimate explanation, it has been proposed that proximity bias originates as an evolutionary social psychology trait when people lived in physically close-knit communities for survival. Some researchers have suggested that a preference for what is nearby may have been adaptive for early hunter-gatherers, when venturing far from one's social group increased exposure to predators and resource scarcity. Under these conditions, individuals who trusted and cooperated with those physically nearby were more likely to survive and reproduce, potentially embedding a preference for proximity into human psychology over generations. This account, however, remains speculative.

A more substantiated theoretical mechanism for proximity bias in the context of probability judgements comes from Construal Level Theory (CLT), which proposes that psychological distance affects how people mentally represent events and objects. Things that are psychologically distant are interpreted abstractly, while nearby things are understood in concrete, vivid terms. Because abstract construals are seen as more hypothetical, spatially distant events tend to be judged as less probable than nearby ones. CLT therefore provides one framework for understanding why spatial proximity influences probability judgements at all.

However, proximity bias goes beyond what CLT alone can explain. When an outcome is personally significant, spatial proximity intensifies how that outcome feels. Positive outcomes feel more desirable when they occur nearby, and negative outcomes feel more undesirable when they occur nearby. This process reflects wishful thinking, a well-documented tendency for people to naturally make optimistic predictions in line with their desires and motivations, seeking out good outcomes and avoiding bad ones. As a result, people tend to predict nearby positive outcomes as more likely to occur, and nearby negative outcomes as less likely to occur. For example, a student waiting for exam results may predict that they are more likely to have passed if the examiner is nearby, as the proximity of the outcome makes the desired result feel more vivid.

The proximity bias is subject to two boundary conditions, both consistent with the wishful thinking account. First, the effect is attenuated when outcomes are only mildly desirable or undesirable, as minimal personal consequences are insufficient to trigger wishful thinking. Second, the bias does not emerge for outcomes that carry no personal consequences for the estimator, since wishful thinking depends on self-relevant motivations. Together, these conditions suggest that proximity bias is fundamentally a motivationally driven phenomenon, arising specifically when outcomes are both spatially close and personally significant.

== Experimental evidence ==
Early evidence for the effect of physical proximity on social behaviour comes from a 1974 field study of Maryland State Police trainees. Recruits were seated alphabetically by last name, meaning that those with surnames closer together in the alphabet sat in closer physical proximity to one another. The study found that trainees formed stronger friendships with those seated nearest to them, and that this proximity effect was stronger than a wide range of other factors typically associated with interpersonal attraction, such as shared attitudes or personality similarity. This provided early naturalistic evidence that physical closeness shapes social bonds independently of personal characteristics.

More direct experimental evidence for proximity bias in probability judgements was provided by Hong et al. (2024), who conducted six studies across a range of decision contexts. In one study, participants imagined their flight had been cancelled and that an airline agent located either nearby or far away was responsible for rebooking. Participants judged a successful rebooking as more likely when the agent was nearby, and less likely when distant. This pattern was replicated across studies involving university examinations and financial allocations in a Dictator Game, demonstrating the robustness of the effect across contexts. Perceived outcome desirability was found to mediate the proximity bias, supporting the wishful thinking account, where nearby outcomes feel more vivid and personally relevant, amplifying how desirable or undesirable they seem.

== Applications ==
=== Workplace and management ===
Within the workplace, proximity bias may be exhibited towards onsite workers and against remote workers. A study of a Chinese travel agency found that employees who worked from home showed a 13% increase in performance, yet were less likely to receive promotions than their office-based peers. Some researchers attribute this disparity partly to the role of passive face time. A study of employee evaluation methods at UC Davis Medical School found that employees simply being unseen at work leads managers to automatically infer negative traits such as being lazy and neglecting their responsibilities, without being aware they are doing so. As a result, trait-based performance evaluations are particularly susceptible to proximity bias, as they rely on subjective impressions of presence rather than measurable contributions.

One strategy to mitigate proximity bias in performance evaluations is for managers to explicitly assess employees based on measurable work output and contributions to organisational performance, rather than subjective impressions of presence. This approach reduces the influence of passive face time on evaluations, ensuring that remote and office-based employees are assessed on equal terms.

=== Finance and investment ===
People exhibit a proximity bias in their investments. Investors have been shown to disproportionately favour geographically local assets in their portfolios, a phenomenon known as home bias or local bias. This tendency to over-invest in nearby companies or domestic markets can result in poorly diversified portfolios and suboptimal financial outcomes.

However, the extent to which this reflects a purely psychological bias has been contested. Some researchers argue that local investment preferences may instead reflect informational advantages. Investors may genuinely possess better knowledge of nearby firms, making local investment a rational rather than biased choice. This debate highlights the difficulty of distinguishing proximity bias from rational information-driven decision-making in real-world financial contexts.

== See also ==
- Affinity bias
