= Huawei GT3 =

2016 smartphone model

Huawei GT3 (Huawei GR5 mini, Honor 7 Lite, Honor 5c)
- Brand: Huawei/Honor
- Manufacturer: Huawei
- Type: Smartphone
- Series: Huawei G Honor Lite/C
- First released: May 2016
- Predecessor: Honor 4C
- Successor: Honor 8 Lite; Honor 6C
- Related: Honor 7 Huawei GR5; Honor 5A
- Compatible networks: GSM; HSPA; LTE
- Colors: Silver, Gray, Gold
- Dimensions: 147.1×73.8×8.3 mm (5.79×2.91×0.33 in)
- Weight: 159 g (5.6 oz)
- Operating system: Android (6.0), EMUI 4.1
- CPU: HiSilicon Kirin 650
- Memory: 2 GB RAM
- Storage: 16 GB
- SIM: microSD, up to 256 GB (uses SIM 2 slot)
- Battery: 3000 mAh, non-revmovable
- Rear camera: 13 MP, AF, f/2.0 LED flash, panorama, HDR; 1080p@30fps 8 MP, f/2.0
- Front camera: 8 MP, f/2.0
- Display: Type: 5.2" LTPS LCD; Resolution: 1080 x 1920 pixels (FullHD) 16:9 ratio 424 pixels per inch
- Connectivity: Wi-Fi (802.11 b/g/n); Bluetooth 4.1; Input data: multi-touch sensor

The Huawei GT3 (also known as Huawei GR5 mini, Honor 7 Lite, and Honor 5c) is an Android smartphone developed and manufactured from the Chinese phone company Huawei. It was announced in April 2016 and released in May.

== Hardware ==
=== Processor ===
The smartphone is powered on the basis of an eight-core Huawei Kirin 650, (4 x 2.0 GHz Cortex-A53 and 4 x 1.7 GHz Cortex-A53) and a Mali-T830MP2 graphics processor. The device received a screen on an IPS matrix with a diagonal of 5.2" and a resolution of 1920x1080. Aspect ratio 16:9.

=== Storage ===
The phone's internal memory configuration is 16 GB, RAM and a RAM of 2 GB.

=== Battery ===
The phone has a non-removable 3000 mAh battery.

=== Camera ===
The smartphone has a 13 MP main camera and an 8 MP front camera. There is no NFC chip.

== Software ==
The Huawei GT3 runs on the Android 6.0 (Marshmallow) operating system with the EMUI 4.1 graphical shell.

The Huawei GT3 supports its communication standards: GSM 850 / 900 / 1800 / 1900 MHz, HSDPA 900 / 2100 / TD-SCDMA — NEM-UL10, LTE: 1, 3, 7, 8, 20.

The Huawei GT3 has supported its network connectivies: HSPA 42.2/5.76 Mbit/s, LTE Cat4 150/50 Mbit/s.

The Huawei GT3 supports its wireless interfaces: WiFi 802.11 b/g/n, Bluetooth 4.1, FM radio. The smartphone supports navigation systems: GPS, GLONASS, BeiDou.

== Synthetic tests ==
A comprehensive set of Basemark OS II 2.0 tests showed a result of 1221 points. Basemark X — 7735.

== Links ==
Huawei GT3 on the official Huawei website (archived version) Description and technical specifications of Huawei GT3 Reviews about the smartphone Prices for the phone in Ukraine (archived version)
