= Huawei Honor X2 =

Tablet computer by Honor

The Huawei Honor X2 also known as the MediaPad X2 is a Android-based tablet made by Honor sub-brand of Huawei. It was launched in March 2015 as a successor to Honor X1.

== Specifications ==
- Weight: 239g
- Dimensions: 183.5 x 103.9 x 7.2 mm
- Display: 7.0 inches, 1200 x 1920 pixels, 323 ppi
- Processor: HiSilicon Kirin 930
- OS: Android 5 (Lollipop), upgradable to 6 (Marshmallow); EMUI 3
- GPU: Mali-T628 MP4
- Storage: 16/32GB ROM (expandable up to 256GB with microSD card)
- RAM: 2/3GB RAM
- Battery: 5000 mAh
- Camera: 13MP rear and 5MP front camera
- Sensors: Accelerometer, gyro, proximity, compass
- SIM: Dual SIM
- Colors: Moonlight silver, Amber gold
