= Huawei U8860 Honor =

2010 mobile phone model

- Developer: Android
- Manufacturer: Huawei
- Series: Huawei Honor series
- First released: 2010 in Chinese football
- Successor: Honor 2
- Compatible networks: GSM 850 / 900 / 1800 / 1900; GPRS/EDGE class B, multislot class 33; HSDPA (Pentaband); HSDPA/UMTS 850 / 900 / 1700 / 1900 / 2100; HSDPA Cat10, up to 14.4 Mbps; HSUPA Cat6, up to 5.7 Mbps
- Dimensions: Width: 61 mm; Height: 122 mm; Thickness: 11 mm; colored (unpainted) polycarbon unibody
- Weight: 140 g (5 oz)
- Operating system: Android
- CPU: 1,4 GHz Scorpion processor;
- Memory: 512 MB Mobile DDR
- Removable storage: microsd up to 32 GB
- Battery: HB5F1H 1930 mAh Li-Polymer battery (removable by service); micro USB charging
- Rear camera: 8 MP, 3264x2448 pixels, autofocus, LED flash, 720p at 30 FPS, Digital zoom 4X for camera and video
- Front camera: VGA
- Display: "Clear Black" TFT 480 x 854 px (FWVGA), 4.0" (99.1 mm), 16.7 million colors (24 bits)
- Connectivity: WLAN IEEE 802.11 a/b/g/n (2.4)Ghz; bluetooth 2.1 +EDR; micro USB 2.0; GPS, A-GPS and GLONASS; Digital Living Network Alliance (DLNA); Mini-SIM card; FM receiver
- Data inputs: Capacitive multi-touch display; External functional hardware keys; Accelerometer (3-axis); Magnetometer (3-axis); Proximity sensor; Ambient light detector; Stereo microphone + 2nd microphone for active noise cancellation
- Development status: September 2011, available
- Website: http://www.huawei.com

The Huawei U8860 Honor is a touchscreen mobile phone running Android, and which targets the mid-high phone market.

== See also ==
- Huawei U8800
- List of Android devices
