= Huawei Honor 4X =

Android smartphone manufactured by Huawei

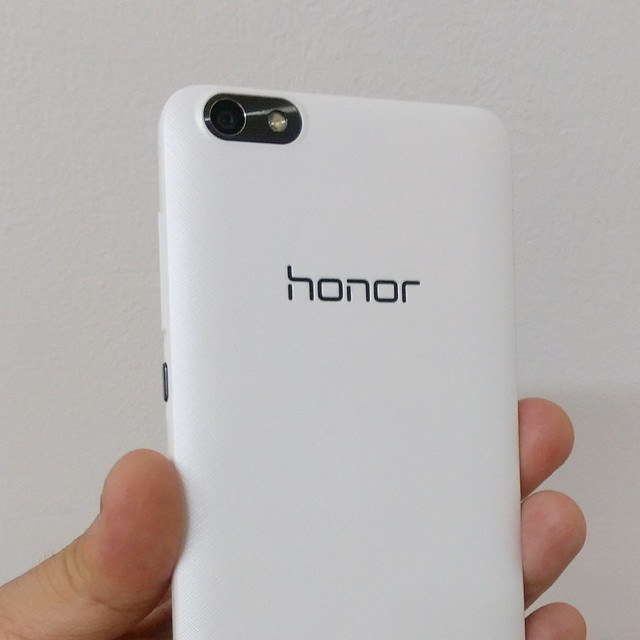
- back of Honor 4X
- Brand: Honor
- Manufacturer: Huawei
- Type: Touchscreen smartphone
- First released: October 2014
- Predecessor: Huawei Honor 3X
- Successor: Honor 5X
- Related: Huawei Honor 4C
- Compatible networks: 2.5G GSM/GPRS/EDGE – 850, 900, 1800, 1900 MHz; 4G LTE Rel. 8 (UE Cat 4) - 1800, 2100, 2600, 800 MHz European
- Form factor: Touchscreen
- Dimensions: 150.9 mm (5.94 in) H 75.2 mm (2.96 in) W 8.7 mm (0.34 in) D
- Weight: 150 g (5.3 oz)
- Operating system: Android 4.4.2 KitKat upgradeable to Android 6.0 Marshmallow
- CPU: HiSilicon Kirin 620 CPU Octa-core (Cortex-A53 1.2GHz)
- GPU: Mali-450 MP4
- Memory: 2GB RAM
- Storage: 8GB
- Removable storage: microSD, up to 32GB / 128 GB on Android 6.0
- Battery: Non-removable 3000 mAh battery (11.5 Wh)
- Rear camera: 13 megapixels 1080p 4160 x 3120 pixels, pixels, Fast Focus, phase detection autofocus, single-LED flash, video 1080p@30fps, HDR
- Front camera: 5 megapixels, front-faced soft light, panorama
- Display: 5.5 in (140 mm) IPS- LCD capacitive touchscreen, 16M colors, 245 ppi (1280x720)
- Connectivity: List: Wi-Fi :802.11 b/g/n/ac; GPS; Dual Sim DSDA; (market dependent); Bluetooth 4.1; USBmicroUSB v2.0, USB Host
- Model: Che2-UL00
- Other: Accelerometer, Gyroscope, Magnetometer, Proximity sensor Compass
- Website: https://www.hihonor.com/global/products/smartphone/honor4x/

The Huawei Honor 4X (also known as Huawei G Play) is a mid-range Android smartphone manufactured by Huawei as part of the Huawei Honor X series. It was released in October 2014, and received generally positive reviews.

== Features ==
=== Hardware ===
The Huawei Honor 4X supports GSM, HSPA and LTE networking. It uses a 5.5-inch IPS display with 720p resolution. It uses either the HiSilicon Kirin 620 octa-core 1.2 GHz Cortex-A53 CPU with Mali-450 graphics, or the Qualcomm Snapdragon 410 quad-core 1.2 GHz Cortex-A53 CPU with Adreno 306 graphics. It contains 2 GB of RAM and 8 GB storage, expandable with an SD card up to 32 GB. It features a 13 MP rear camera with autofocus and LED flash that supports 1080p video recording, and a 5 MP front camera that supports 720p video recording. It uses a lithium polymer 3000 mAh battery that supports up to 200 hours of 3G standby time and 15 hours of 3G talk time.

=== Software ===
The Honor 4X comes preinstalled with Android 4.4.2 KitKat with Huawei's custom Emotion UI. The launcher does not include an app drawer, with apps spread across multiple home screens, thus the interface resembles iOS more than Android. Huawei plans an upgrade to Android Lollipop and marshmallow. A simple home screen style is also available.

== Reception ==
The Huawei Honor 4X received generally positive reviews.

Tomos Ellis of TechRadar reviewed the version with the octa-core processor, and gave the Honor 4X a 4 out of 5. The review praised the performance of the 64-bit octa-core processor and 2 GB of RAM, long battery life provided with the 3000 mAh battery, dual-sim functionality, good build quality and camera quality, and opined that the online-only availability was likely to reduce costs, but criticized the lack of an app drawer in the custom Emotion UI Android skin, noting that separating apps across multiple homescreens was "too cluttered" and that the icons were "garish, cartoon-like". The review also noted that while competitors like the 2014 Moto G and Sony Xperia M2 Aqua exist in a similar price range, none of them were phablet-sized like the Honor 4X.

Katharine Byrne of Expert Reviews reviewed the version with the octa-core processor, and also gave the Honor 4X a 4 out of 5, comparing the device favorably against the 2014 Moto G. The review appreciated the camera, saying that the outdoor photo quality was "much brighter and more vivid" than photos taken with the Moto G, and that the Honor 4X also has longer battery life and higher benchmark, web browsing, and graphics performance. The review noted that the display had high brightness and contrast, but criticized the colour accuracy, noting low sRGB colour gamut coverage.

Komal Mohan of The Times of India reviewed the version with the slower quad-core processor, and gave the Honor 4X a 3.5 out of 5. The review noted that the lack of backlighting for the capacitive front keys are an inconvenience, and said that the device "is on the chunky side" with its thickness of 8.7 mm. The sunlight legibility and touch sensitivity of the display were praised, but the viewing angles were disappointing. The review pointed out that the device's 3000 mAh battery was "one of its biggest strengths", but said that the Adreno 306 GPU of the quad-core Snapdragon 410 processor created noticeable lag when playing resource-intensive games.
