= Huawei Honor 5X =

Android smartphone

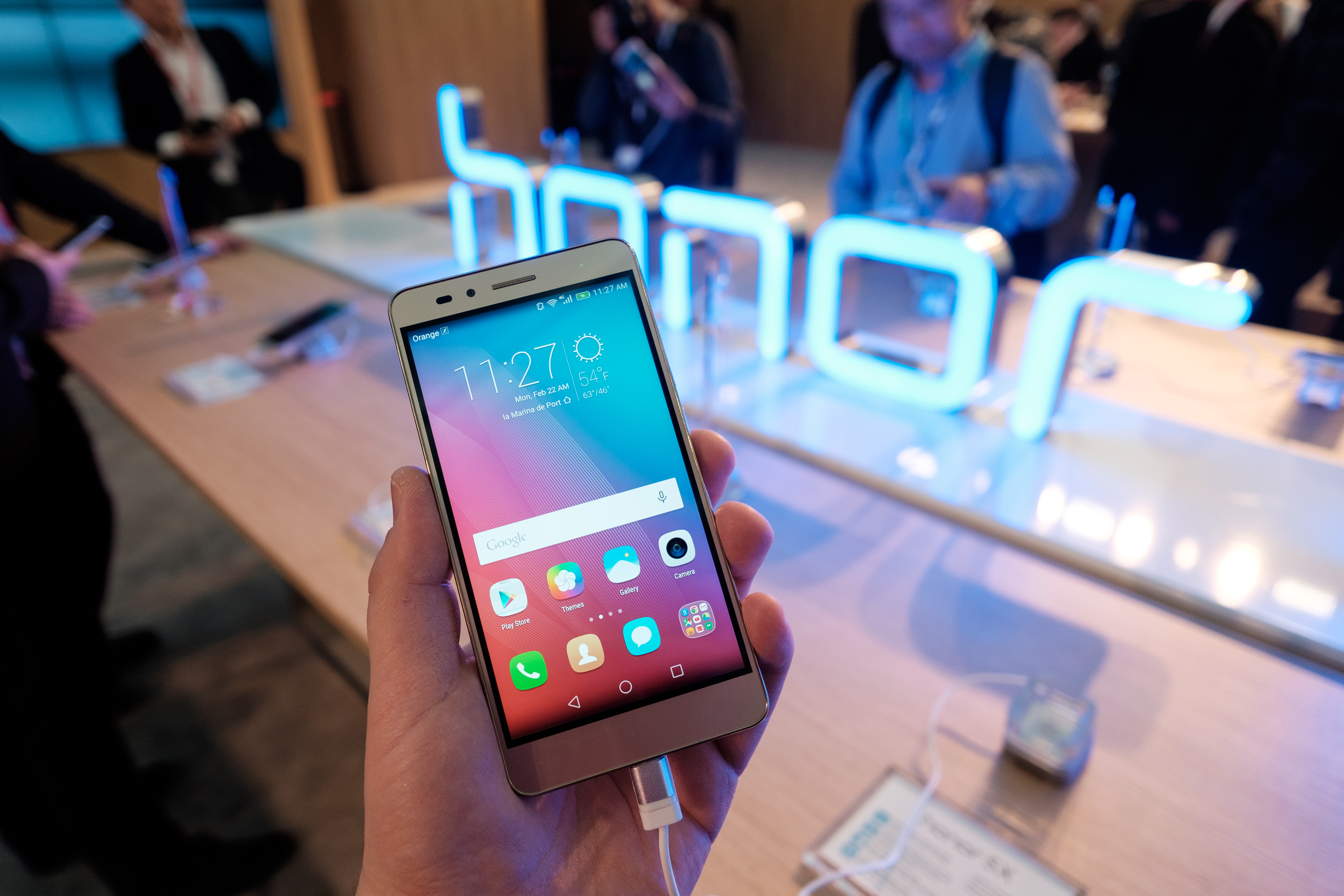
- Manufacturer: Huawei
- Predecessor: Honor 4X
- Successor: Honor 6X
- Operating system: Android 5.1.1 Lollipop with EMUI 3.1, updated to Android 7.0 Nougat with EMUI 5.
- CPU: Qualcomm Snapdragon 616
- GPU: Adreno 405 GPU
- Memory: 2 or 3 GB of LPDDR3 RAM
- Storage: 16 GB of internal storage.
- Battery: 3000 mAh
- Rear camera: 13 Megapixel rear camera with dual-LED flash, f/2.0 aperture and Phase Detection AutoFocus
- Front camera: f/2.4 5 Megapixel front facing camera
- Display: 5.5 inch 1080p fully laminated display with a pixel density of 401 ppi
- Other: FPC1020 fingerprint scanner
- Website: Hihonor

The Huawei Honor 5X (Chinese: 荣耀畅玩5X; also known as Huawei GR5) is a mid-range Android smartphone manufactured by Huawei as part of the Huawei Honor X series. It uses the Qualcomm Snapdragon 616 processor and an aluminum body design. It was first released in China in October 2015, and was released in the United States and India in January 2016.

== Specifications ==
=== Hardware ===
The Honor 5X has a metal-clad design using "aviation-grade aluminum" for its body. It uses a 5.5-inch 1080p fully laminated display with a pixel density of 401 ppi, octa-core Qualcomm Snapdragon 616 processor with an Adreno 405 GPU, 2 or 3 GB of DDR3 RAM, and 16 GB of internal storage. It has "Fingerprint 2.0 technology", which allows user to directly unlock the smartphone with just user input using an FPC1020 fingerprint scanner. The Honor 5X comes with 13 Megapixel rear camera with dual-LED flash, f/2.0 aperture and Phase Detection AutoFocus. It has a f/2.4 5 Megapixel front facing camera. It comes in 16GB in-built storage which can be expanded up to 128GB using MicroSD card and has a 3000 mAh battery.

=== Software ===
The Honor 5X was originally marketed with Emotion User Interface v3.1, a customisation of Android Lollipop; Android Marshmallow and EMUI 4 updates followed. The device is officially supported by LineageOS v14.1 up to v16.0 (Android Pie)(Beta version is v17.0 with android 10), a free and open-source operating system based on Android (operating system). The LineageOS release was preceded by unofficial builds of CyanogenMod v13.0, which is based on Android Marshmallow.

== History ==
The Honor 5X was first announced at an event held by Huawei in Chengdu on 27 October 2015. The smartphone was initially offered in two versions; the model with 2 GB of RAM memory had a price of CN¥ 999 and the model with 3 GB of RAM memory had a price of CN¥ 1,399. It launched in India at ₹12,999. On January 28, it was listed on Flipkart and Amazon for sale.

On 6 January 2016, during CES 2016, Huawei announced that the version of the Honor 5X with 2 GB of RAM memory would be sold in the United States for US$199.
