= Honor 20 =

Huawei smartphone

Honor 20 Honor 20 PRO

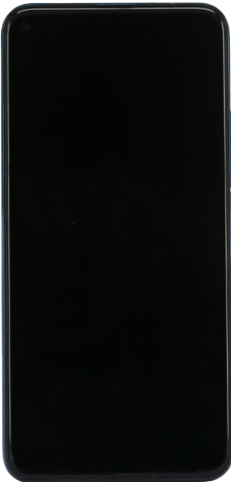
- Honor 20 PRO front
- Brand: Honor
- Manufacturer: Huawei
- Type: Slate
- Series: HONOR series
- First released: May 21, 2019; 7 years ago (London, United Kingdom)
- Availability by region: May 31, 2019 (China)
- Predecessor: Honor 10
- Successor: Honor 30
- Compatible networks: LTE-FDD/TD-LTE/WCDMA/CDMA/GSM: Main card: LTE FDD: B1/B3/B4/B5/B8/B19, TD-LTE: B34/B38/B39/B40/B41 (2555MHz~2655MHz), WCDMA: B1/B4/B5/B6/B8/B19, TD-SCDMA: B34 /B39, CDMA (choose one of primary and secondary cards): BC0 (only for China Telecom (Mainland China + Macau)), GSM: B2/B3/B5/B8; Secondary card: LTE FDD: B1/B3/B4/B5 /B8/B19, TD-LTE: B34/B38/B39/B40/B41 (2555~2655 MHz), WCDMA: B1/B4/B5/B6/B8/B19, CDMA: BC0 (800MHz) (only for China Telecom (Mainland China + Macau)), GSM: B2/B3/B5/B8 (850/900/1800/1900 MHz
- Form factor: Smartphone+ hard Phone
- Dimensions: List: Honor 20154.25 mm (6.073 in) Height 73.97 mm (2.912 in) Width 7.87 mm (0.310 in) Thickness; Honor 20 PRO154 mm (6.1 in) Height 74 mm (2.9 in) width 8.44 mm (0.332 in) thickness
- Weight: Honor 20: 173 g (6.1 oz); Honor 20 PRO: 182 g (6.4 oz)
- Operating system: Android Pie 9.0
- System-on-chip: HiSilicon Kirin 980
- CPU: Octa-core (2x2.6 GHz Cortex-A76 & 2x1.92 GHz Cortex-A76 & 4x1.8 GHz Cortex-A55)
- GPU: Mali-G76 720MHz and MP10
- Memory: 6 or 8 GB RAM
- Storage: 128 or 256 GB
- Battery: 3,750 mAh
- Rear camera: Quad (48 MP + 16 MP + 2 MP + 2 MP) with Dual-LED and AF
- Front camera: 32 million pixels, f/2.0 aperture
- Display: 6.26 in (159 mm) FHD+ (2,310 × 1,080 resolution)
- Sound: USB-C
- Connectivity: USB-C, Wifi 802.11 b/g/n/a/ac, Bluetooth5.0
- Data inputs: List: Gravity sensor, ambient light sensor, proximity light sensor, gyroscope, compass; GPS (L1+L5 dual frequency)/AGPS/Glonass/Beidou/Galileo (E1+E5a dual frequency)/QZSS ( L1+L5 dual frequency)
- Codename: Honor 20: YAL-AL00; Honor 20 PRO: YAL-AL10
- Other: Fast battery charging 22.5W; A fingerprint sensor integrated into the power button
- Website: www.hihonor.com/global/products/smartphone/honor20/

The Honor 20 is a smartphone made by Huawei under their Honor sub-brand. It is a successor of the Huawei Honor 10 within the Huawei Honor series.

It was unveiled in London on May 21.

It became available in the United Kingdom on June 21 and in India on June 25, 2019. It retails for £400 in the UK or €499 in Europe. Colors provided are midnight black, sapphire blue and Icelandic white.

== Specifications ==
=== Hardware ===
The Honor 20 has a HiSilicon Kirin 980 octa-core processor, a Mali-G76 MP10 GPU, and a 3,750 mAh non-removable battery. It has a 6.26-inch “all-view” display LCD screen.

The phone has four rear cameras including a 48-megapixel main camera, a 16-megapixel super-wide-angle camera, a 2-megapixel depth camera and a 2-megapixel macro camera.

The HONOR 20 shares many core similarities with the Pro version – using the same SoC, for example – but with less onboard RAM at 6GB and only 128GB of native storage. Another difference is that the rear quad camera's 8-megapixel telephoto unit has been exchanged with a 2-megapixel depth assisting unit. The device features the same display and front camera as the Pro version, but the battery capacity is slightly less at 3,750mAh, though it uses the same charger as the Pro version.

The HONOR 20 comes in Phantom Blue or Phantom Black for the global market, Icelandic White for the China market, and is priced at €499.

=== Software ===
The Honor 20 launched with Android Pie (version 9.0) and EMUI 9.0.

== Reception ==
On June 18, Honor 20 reached 1 million sales in China.

== Selling Price ==
International version price
Honor 20	Honor 20 Pro
€499 (6GB+128GB)	€599 (8GB+256GB)
Price of mainland China version
Honor 20	Honor 20 Pro
¥2699 (8 GB+128 GB) ¥2999 (8 GB+256 GB)	¥3199 (8 GB+128 GB) ¥3499 (8 GB+256 GB)
