= Honor 10 =

Smartphone model manufactured by Huawei

- Brand: Honor
- Type: smartphone
- First released: April 19, 2018; 8 years ago
- Predecessor: Honor 9
- Successor: Honor 10; Honor 20
- Compatible networks: TD-LTE; FDD-LTE; TD-SCDMA; WCDMA; CDMA2000; CDMA 1X; GSM; (Each model and version supports different networks, and some models support dual SIM cards)
- Form factor: phablet
- Dimensions: 149.6 mm (5.89 in) H height 71.2 mm (2.80 in) W width 7.7 mm (0.30 in) D deep
- Weight: 153 g (5.4 oz)
- Operating system: Emotion UI 8.1 based on Android 8.1 Oreo
- System-on-chip: Kirin970
- CPU: 4xCortex A73 2.36GHz + 4xCortex A53 1.8GHz + Micro Core i6
- GPU: Mali G72 MP12
- Memory: 4GB/6GB RAM; The above are all LPDDR4 specifications
- Storage: 64GB/128GB (both UFS 2.1)
- Removable storage: microSD, not expandable GB
- Battery: 3400 mAh lithium polymer battery
- Rear camera: 16 million pixels (color) + 24 million pixels (black and white), F/1.8 aperture, supports autofocus
- Front camera: 24 million pixels, F/2.0 aperture, supports fixed focal length
- Display: 5.8 inches negative LCD, 2240x1080 pixels
- Sound: 3.5mm headphone jack
- Connectivity: Wi-Fi(802.11 a/b/g/n/ac), Bluetooth 4.2, GPS/GLONASS/Beidou/Galileo Navigation
- Model: COL-AL00 (China version)
- Codename: COL-L29 COL-AL00; COL-AL10 (Premium edition); COL-TL00 COL-TL10

The Honor 10 is a smartphone made by Huawei under their Honor sub-brand.

The phone was released in April 2018, outside China in May 2018, and succeeded by the Honor 20 in June 2019. It uses the Kirin 970 SoC and is equipped with a 5.84" 2280x1080 LCD.

It was available in a version with 4 GB memory and 64 GB of storage capacity, and a 'Premium edition' offering 6 GB of memory and double the amount of storage. In July, Honor launched the Honor 10 GT, further upgrading the model to 8 GB of memory and offering improved GPU performance and camera software. In June 2021, Huawei announced that the Honor 10 line would be eligible for installing HarmonyOS.

It was noted for being one of the first phones on the market featuring an ultrasonic fingerprint reader, as opposed to the conventional capacitive type.

== Reception ==
The phone was praised for being good value for money, offering a good build and screen quality, decent performance and camera quality, but reviewers criticized the phone for lacking wireless charging and water resistance.
