= Honor 9 =

Huawei smartphone

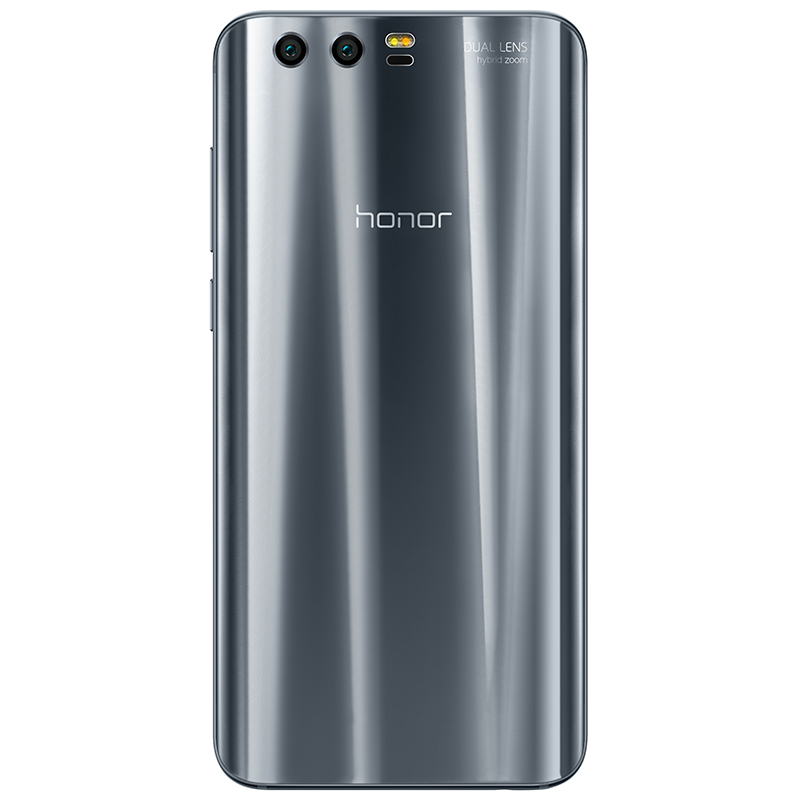
- Rear view of the Honor 9
- Brand: Honor
- Manufacturer: Huawei
- Type: Slate
- Series: Honor N
- First released: June 2017; 9 years ago
- Predecessor: Honor 8
- Successor: Honor 10
- Related: Honor 9 Lite
- Form factor: Smartphone+ hard Phone
- Dimensions: 147.3 mm (5.80 in) H 70.9 mm (2.79 in) W 7.5 mm (0.30 in) D
- Weight: 155 g (5.5 oz)
- Operating system: Original: Android 7.0 "Nougat" Current: Android 9 "Pie"
- System-on-chip: HiSilicon Kirin 960
- CPU: Octa-core (4x2.4 GHz + 4x1.8 GHz)
- GPU: Mali-G71
- Memory: 4 or 6 GB RAM
- Storage: 64 or 128 GB
- Removable storage: microSD, up to 256 GB
- Battery: 3,200 mAh
- Rear camera: Dual (20 MP + 12 MP), laser autofocus, 4K video, LED flash
- Front camera: 8 MP, f/2.0
- Display: 5.15 in (131 mm) FHD (1,920 × 1,080 resolution)
- Connectivity: Hybrid Dual SIM (nano + nano/microSD), LTE Cat.6, Wi-Fi a/b/g/n/ac (2,4/5 GHz), Bluetooth 4.2, GPS, NFC, USB 2.0 Type-C
- Other: Hall sensor; infrared sensor; fingerprint sensor; proximity sensor; ambient light sensor; digital compass; gravity sensor; gyroscope; status indicator
- Website: www.hihonor.com/global/products/smartphone/honor9/

The Honor 9 is a smartphone made by Huawei under their Honor sub-brand. It is a successor of the Huawei Honor 8 within the Honor N series.

== Specifications ==
=== Hardware ===
The Honor 9 has a HiSilicon Kirin 960 octa-core processor (four 2.4 GHz cores and four 1.8 GHz cores), a Mali-G71 MP8 GPU, and a 3,200 mAh non-removable battery. It measures 147.3 millimetres (5.80 in) by 70.9 millimetres (2.79 in) by 7.5 millimetres (0.30 in) and weighs 155 grams (5.5 oz).

The phone comes with 64 or 128 gigabytes of storage and 4 GB or 6 GB of RAM, depending on the region. It has a 5.15-inch (13.1 cm) display with a pixel resolution of 1920x1080 and pixel density of 428 ppi. The Honor 9 has an 8 MP front-facing camera and its dual rear camera setup consists of a 12 MP RGB lens and a 20-megapixel monochrome lens. It can record video in 4K and has electronic image stabilization for Full HD video. Other features include dual-SIM support, furthermore includes a USB-C port, and a fingerprint reader located on the lower bezel.

The Honor 9 has a metal frame and a 3D curved glass rear, and its official tagline is "the light catcher." The phone comes in "Glacier Grey," "Sapphire Blue," "Midnight Black," and gold, but some colors are not available in certain markets. During IFA 2017 in Berlin, Honor announced the new color variant for the Honor 9, which was the limited edition "Robin Egg Blue." The color became available in China in August, and was released in the United Kingdom in September.

=== Software ===
Huawei launched the Honor 9 with Android 7 Nougat and Huawei's EMUI 5.1 user interface. In the spring of 2019, Huawei began rolling out Android 9 Pie with Huawei's EMUI 9.0 user interface.

== Release ==
The phone was released in China on June 12, 2017, revealed in Berlin on June 27, 2017, and became available for pre-ordering across United Kingdom on June 27, 2017.

== Reception ==
Overall, initial reviews of the Honor 9 were positive, averaging 8.8 out of 10. Android Authority's Gary Sims gave the phone a rating of 8.7 out of 10, and wrote in his review summary: "The Honor 9 certainly ticks a lot of the right boxes: great performance, dual cameras, sleek design, and an IR blaster! The only downsides are the lack of toughened glass over the display and the slippery nature of the build materials." Andy Boxall of Digital Trends wrote the following as a summary of his review: "The Honor 9 impresses so much, it's a strong contender for one of the best reasonably priced smartphones available." PC Magazine's Thomas Newton assigned the Honor 9 a rating of 4 out of 5, meaning "excellent". Swedroid offered its recommendation and rated the phone 8.3 out of 10 overall.

Jessica Murgia of AndroidPit, Dominic Preston of TechAdvisors, James Peckham of TechRadar, and ZDNet's Sandra Vogel each rated the phone 4.5 out of 5. Preston's summary read, "The Honor 9 is an undeniably impressive phone for an unmatched price right now. In performance terms, it's nipping at the heels of the year's top flagships, and only lacking flashy features like waterproofing or a bezel-less screen. It looks great, it runs fast, and it costs less than £400. We're sold." Summarizing his review, Peckham wrote, "The Honor 9 offers a lot of what the high-end flagship phones do right now, but for a much lower price. There's no exciting, headline-grabbing feature here, but a great design, fantastic performance and lots of nice touches make this an all-round impressive and affordable phone." Vogel also gave a rating of 8.9 on a 10-point scale, meaning "outstanding".

Android Central's Alex Dobie called the Honor 9 the "best phone for less than £400". He gave the phone the "Choice Award" and wrote, "The Honor 9 isn't perfect, but it is a great all-rounder that makes high-end performance and design more affordable than ever before." Stuff rated the Honor 9 five out of five stars and said, "High-end hardware at a middleweight price makes the Honor 9 one of the best phone deals around." TechRadar recommend the Honor 9, which won in the "Best Mid-range Phone" category at the 2017 T3 Awards.
