= Huawei Honor 3C =

Smartphones part of Huawei Honor lineup

Huawei Honor 3C, 3C 4G & 3C Play
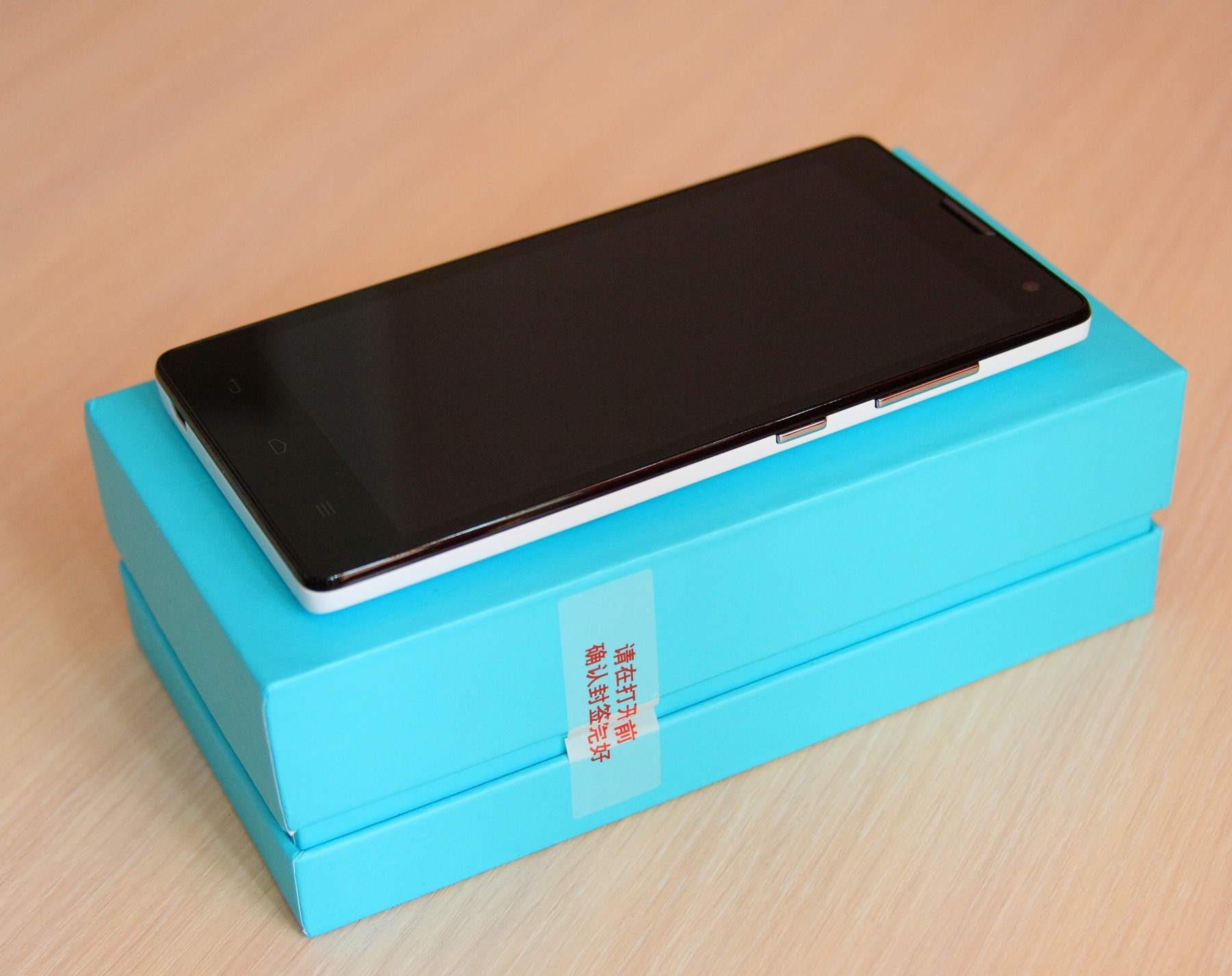
- Honor 3C
- Manufacturer: Huawei
- Type: Smartphone
- Series: Huawei Honor
- First released: 3C: December 2013; 3C 4G: April 2014; 3C Play: August 2014
- Successor: Huawei Honor 4C
- Compatible networks: GSM: 900 / 1800 / 1900 (SIM 1 & SIM 2); HSDPA: 900 (4G & Play only) / 2100; 4G (Honor 3C 4G): 1, 3, 41
- Form factor: Slate
- Color: White / Black
- Dimensions: Honor 3C & 3C 4G: 139.5 x 71.4 x 9.2 mm (5.49 x 2.81 x 0.36 in); Honor 3C Play: 142.2 x 72.3 x 9.4 mm (5.60 x 2.85 x 0.37 in)
- Weight: Honor 3C & 3C 4G: 4.94 oz (140 g); Honor 3C Play: 5.50 oz (156 g)
- Operating system: Android 4.4.2 Kitkat
- System-on-chip: Mediatek MT6582 (3C & 3C Play); Kirin 910 (3C 4G)
- CPU: 3C & 3C Play: 1.3 GHz Cortex-A7 quad-core 3C 4G: 1.6 GHz Cortex-A9
- GPU: 3C & 3C Play: Mali-400MP2; 3C 3G: Mali-450MP4
- Memory: 2 GB RAM
- Storage: 8 GB for 3C,16GB for 3C play
- SIM: 3C & 3C Play: Dual SIM (Micro-SIM, dual stand-by); 3C 4G: Micro-SIM
- Battery: 3C: 2300 mAh Li-po; 3C 4G: 2300 mAh Li-ion; 3C Play: 2000 mAh Li-ion

The Honor 3C is a mid-end Android smartphone manufactured by Huawei. It was released in December 2013 (April 2014 for the 4G model, and August 2014 for the 3C Play). It is the first mid end phone of Huawei's subrand Honor.

== Specifications ==
The Honor 3C, 3C 4G and 3C Play has a 5.0-inch in-plane switching LCD display with resolution of 720 x 1280 px. All smartphones have 2 GB of RAM, 8 GB of internal storage and is connectable using Bluetooth and Wi-Fi. The storage configuaration may differ from the following models:

Both models feature a Sony 8MP wide-angle main camera with aperture at f/2.0 and can record videos up to 1080p @ 30fps. It also comes with a 5MP front camera with aperture at f/2.4, while the 3C Play features a 2MP front camera.

Storage configuration
	Honor 3C	Honor 3C 4G	Honor 3C Play
Storage	8GB	8GB / 16GB	16GB
RAM	1GB	1GB / 2GB	1GB

=== Software ===
This phone is shipped with Android 4.2.2, with the EMUI 2.0 lite. It is updated by Huawei to EMUI 3.0 (Android 4.4 Kitkat) in 2015 and further supported by unofficial builds until Android 7.1.

This phone has GPS. It is also the first non-flagship phone that has 720p display and it is the smallest 720p display phone from Huawei.
