= Honor 50 =

Smartphone made by Huawei

Honor 50 Honor 50 Pro Honor 50 SE Huawei Nova 9 Huawei Nova 9 Pro
- Brand: Honor
- Manufacturer: Huawei
- Type: Phablet
- Series: Honor N Huawei Nova
- First released: Honor 50 & 50 Pro & 50 SE: June 16, 2021; 5 years ago Nova 9 & 9 Pro: September 23, 2021; 5 years ago
- Predecessor: Honor 30
- Successor: Honor 60
- Weight: Honor 50 & Nova 9: 175 g (6.2 oz); 50 Pro: 187 g (6.6 oz); 50 SE: 191 g (6.7 oz)< br/>Nova 9 Pro: 186 g (6.6 oz)
- Operating system: Initial: Honor 50 & 50 Pro & 50 SE: Android 11 + Magic UI 4.2; Nova 9: Android 11 + EMUI 12 / HarmonyOS 2.0; Nova 9 Pro: HarmonyOS 2.0
- CPU: List: Honor 50 & 50 Pro & Nova 9 & 9 Pro: Qualcomm Snapdragon 778G (6 nm), 8 cores (1×2.4 GHz Kryo 670 Prime & 3×2.2 GHz Kryo 670 Gold & 4×1.9 GHz Kryo 670 Silver) Honor 50 SE: MediaTek MT6877 Dimensity 900 5G (6 nm) ), 8 cores (2×2.4 GHz Cortex-A78 & 6×2.0 GHz Cortex-A55)
- GPU: Honor 50 & 50 Pro & Nova 9 & 9 Pro: Adreno 642L; Honor 50 SE: Mali-G68 MC4
- Memory: Honor 50 & 50 SE & Nova 9 & 9 Pro: 128/256 GB; 50 Pro: 256 GB; UFS 2.1
- Battery: All models: non-removable, Lithium polymer Honor 50 & 50 SE & Nova 9: 4300 mAh; Honor 50 Pro & Nova 9 Pro: 4000 mAh
- Charging: Honor 50: fast charging at 66 W, 70 % in 20 min (advertised); Honor 50 Pro: fast charging at 100 W, 100 % in 25 min (advertised); Honor 50 SE: fast charging at 66 W, 75 % in 20 min (advertised); Nova 9: fast charging at 66 W, 60 % in 18 min, 100 % in 38 min (advertised); Nova 9 Pro: fast charging at 100 W, 100 % in 20 min (advertised)
- Rear camera: List: Honor 50: 32 Mp, f/2.2 (wide-angle), 1/3.14" Honor 50 Pro: 32 Mp, f/2.2 (wide-angle), 1/3.14" + 12 Mp, f/2.4, 18 mm, 100˚ (ultra-wide), 1/2.8", 1.25 µm Honor 50 SE: 16 Mp, f/2.2 (wide-angle) Nova 9: 32 Mp, f/2.0 (wide-angle) Nova 9 Pro: 32 Mp, f/2.0 (wide-angle) + 32 MP, f/2.4, 100˚ (ultra-wide)
- Front camera: Honor 50 & 50 Pro: 108 Mp, f/1.9 (wide-angle), 1/1.52", 0.7 µm, PDAF + 8 Mp, f/2.2, 120˚, 17mm (ultra-wide) + 2MP, f/2.4 (macro) + 2MP, f/2.4 (depth sensor); Honor 50 SE: 108 MP, f/1.9 (wide angle), 1/1.52", 0.7 µm, PDAF + 8 MP, f/2.2, 120˚, 17 mm (ultra-wide) + 2 Mp, f/2.4 (macro); Nova 9 & 9 Pro: 50 Mp, f/1.9, 23 mm (wide-angle), PDAF + 8 MP, f/2.2, 120˚, 17 mm (ultra-wide) + 2 MP, f/2.4 (macro) + 2 MP, f/2.4 (depth sensor) LED flash, HDR, panorama Video: 4K@30fps, 1080p@30/60fps, gyro-EIS
- Sound: USB-C

The Honor 50 is a line of smartphones made by Huawei under their Honor sub-brand, included in the flagship "N" series. The line consists of "Honor 50", "50 Pro" and "50 SE". They were presented on 16 June 2021. Also on September 23 of the same year, the Huawei Nova 9 and Huawei Nova 9 Pro (stylized as HUAWEI nova 9 and HUAWEI nova 9 Pro), which are very similar to the Honor 50 and Honor 50 Pro respectively. Honor explains the similarities between the smartphones by the fact that they were developed before the Honor spin-off from Huawei.

The phone is the first Honor device to include Google apps by default and to be released outside of China.

== Specifications ==
=== Platform ===
Honor 50 series smartphones were released on Magic UI 4.2 based on Android 11. The global version of Honor 50 includes Google Play services.

The Chinese versions of the Huawei Nova 9 and Nova 9 Pro have been released on HarmonyOS 2.0. The global version of Nova 9 was released on EMUI 12 based on Android 11. Models do not have Google Play services.

=== Software ===
The Honor 50 and 50 Pro were the first smartphones to receive a Qualcomm Snapdragon 778G processor with an Adreno 642L GPU. Huawei Nova 9 and Nova 9 Pro received the same platform.

The Honor 50 SE received a MediaTek Dimensity 900 processor and a Mali-G78 MC4 GPU.
