= Honor 60 =

Smartphone made by Huawei

Honor 60 Honor 60 Pro Honor 60 SE
- Brand: Honor
- Manufacturer: Huawei
- Type: Phablet
- Series: Honor N
- First released: 60/Pro: December 1, 2021; 4 years ago 60 SE: February 7, 2022; 4 years ago
- Availability by region: China
- Predecessor: Honor 50
- Successor: Honor 70; Honor 80 SE
- Form factor: Slate
- Dimensions: 60: 160.4 × 73.8 × 8 mm 60 Pro: 163.9 × 74.8 × 8.2 mm 60 SE: 161.3 × 73.4 × 7.7 mm
- Weight: 60: 179 g (6.3 oz); 60 Pro: 192 g (6.8 oz); 60 SE: 175 g (6.2 oz)
- Operating system: Initial: Android 11 + Magic UI 5.0; Current: Android 13 + Magic UI 7.1
- System-on-chip: 60: Qualcomm Snapdragon 778G (6 nm); 60 Pro: Qualcomm Snapdragon 778G+ (6 nm); 60 SE: MediaTek MT6877 Dimensity 900 5G (6 nm)
- CPU: List: 60: 8 cores (1×2.4 GHz Kryo 670 Prime & 3×2.2 GHz Kryo 670 Gold & 4×1.9 GHz Kryo 670 Silver) 60 Pro: 8 cores (1×2.5 GHz Kryo 670 Prime & 3×2.4 GHz Kryo 670 Gold & 4×1.8 GHz Kryo 670 Silver) 60 SE: 8 cores (2×2.4 GHz Cortex-A78 & 6×2.0 GHz Cortex-A55)
- GPU: 60/Pro: Adreno 642L; 60 SE: Mali-G68 MC4
- Memory: 8/12 GB, LPDDR4X
- Storage: 60/SE: 128/256 GB; 60 Pro: 256 GB; UFS 2.1
- Battery: 60: non-removable, Li-Ion 4800 mAh; 60 Pro: non-removable, Li-Po 4800 mA·h; 60 SE: non-removable, Li-Ion 4300 mA·h
- Charging: All models: fast charging at 66 W, reverse charging at 5 W 60/Pro: 50 % in 15 min (advertised); 60 SE: 55 % in 15 min (advertised)
- Rear camera: List: 60: 32 Mp, f/2.4 (wide-angle) Video: 1080p@30fps, gyro- EIS 60 Pro: 50 Mp, f/2.4, 18 mm (Ultra Wide) Video: 4K@30fps, 1080p@30fps, gyro-EIS 60 SE: 16 Mp, f/2.5 (wide angle) Video: 1080p@30fps
- Front camera: 60: 108 Mp, f/1.9 (wide-angle), 1/1.52", 0.7 μm, PDAF + 8 Mp, f/2.2, 112˚ (ultra-wide) + 2 Mp, f/2.4 (macro); 60 Pro: 108 Mp, f/1.9 (wide-angle), 1/1.52", 0.7 μm, PDAF + 50 Mp, f/2.2, 122˚(ultra-wide) + 2 Mp, f/2.4 (macro); 60 SE: 64 Mp, f/1.8 (wide), PDAF + 5 Mp, f/2.2 (ultra-wide angle) + 2 Mp, f/2.4 (macro); LED flash, HDR, panorama Video: 4K@30fps, 1080p@30/60fps, gyro-EIS
- Display: All models: OLED, 120 Hz; 60/SE: 6.67", 2400 × 1080 (FullHD+), 20:9, 395 ppi, HDR10 (60)/HDR (60 SE); 60 Pro: 6.78", 2652 × 1200, 19.9: 9, 429 ppi, HDR10+
- Sound: USB-C
- Connectivity: List: USB-C 2.0, Bluetooth 5.2/5.1 (60 SE) (A2DP, LE, aptX HD (except 60 SE), NFC (except 60 SE), Wi-Fi 802.11 a/b/g/n/ac/6 (except 60 SE) (dual-band, Wi-Fi Direct, hotspot), GPS, A-GPS, GLONASS, BDS
- Other: Fingerprint scanner (built-in under the display, optical), proximity sensor, light sensor, accelerometer, gyroscope, compass

Honor 60 is a line of smartphones developed by the company Honor, as a part of the flagship “N” series. The line consists of Honor 60, 60 Pro and 60 SE. Honor 60 and 60 Pro launched on December 1, 2021, and Honor 60 SE on February 7, 2022.

== Design ==
The screen and back panel are made of glass. The frame is made of plastic.

In terms of design, the Honor 60 and 60 Pro resemble the previous line Honor 50, while the Honor 60 SE resembles the iPhone 13 Pro.

The USB-C connector, speaker, microphone, and slot for 2 SIM cards are located below. On the top is 1 additional microphone in the Honor 60, 1 additional microphone and a second speaker in the 60 Pro, and 2 additional microphones in the 60 SE. On the right side are the volume rocker and the power button.

Honor 60 is sold in 4 colors: Magic Starry Sky (Light-blue), Juliet (silver-pink), Jade Ink Green and Bright Black.

The Honor 60 Pro is available in 5 colors: HONOR Code (Blue with HONOR lettering), Magic Starry Sky (Light Blue), Juliet (Silver Pink), Jade Ink Green and Bright Black.

Honor 60 SE is sold in 3 colors: Streamer Magic Mirror (blue), Jade Ink Green and Bright Black.

== Specifications ==
=== Platform ===
The Honor 60 received a Qualcomm Snapdragon 778G processor, and the 60 Pro —Snapdragon 778G+. Both processors are paired with an Adreno 642L GPU.

Honor 60 SE received a processor MediaTek MT6877 Dimensity 900 and graphics processor Mali-G68 MC4.

=== Battery ===
Honor 60 and 60 Pro received a 4800 mAh battery, and Honor 60 SE — 4300 mAh. Honor 60 and 60 SE have a lithium-ion type battery, while the Honor 60 Pro has a lithium-polymer. Also, all models have support for fast charging at 66 W and reverse wired charging at 5 W.

=== Camera ===
==== Primary camera ====
Honor 60 received a triple main camera 108 MP, f/1.9 (wide-angle) with phase autofocus + 8 MP, f/2.2 (ultra-wide-angle) with a viewing angle of 112° + 2 MP, f/2.4 (macro).

Honor 60 Pro received a triple main camera 108 MP, f/1.9 (wide angle) with phase autofocus + 50 MP, f/2.2 (ultra-wide angle) with a viewing angle of 122° + 2 MP, f/2.4 (macro).

Honor 60 SE received a main triple camera 64 MP, f/1.8 (wide-angle) with phase autofocus + 5 MP, f/2.2 (ultra-wide) + 2 MP, f/2.4 (macro).

All models are able to record video in resolution 4K@30fps.

==== Front camera ====
Honor 60 received a front camera of 32 Mp, f/2.4 (wide-angle) with the ability to record video in resolution 1080p@30fps.

Honor 60 Pro received a front camera of 50 MP, f/2.4 (ultra-wide angle) with the ability to record video in resolution 4K@30fps.

Honor 60 SE received a 16MP, f/2.5 (wide-angle) front camera with the ability to record video in 1080p@30fps resolution.

=== Screen ===
Honor 60 and 60 SE received a curved OLED-screen, 6.67-inch, Full HD+ (2400×1080) with a pixel density of 395 PPI, an aspect ratio of 20:9, a display refresh rate of 120 Hz and a round cut-out for the front-facing camera, which is located at the top in the center.There is support for HDR10 in the Honor 60, and HDR in the 60 SE.

Honor 60 Pro received a curved OLED screen, 6.78-inch, 2652 × 1200 with a pixel density of 429 PPI, an aspect ratio of 19.9:9, a display refresh rate of 120 Hz, support for HDR10+ technology, and a round cut-out for the front camera, which is located on top in the center.

=== Sound ===
Honor 60 Pro has stereo speakers on the top and bottom sides of the frame. Honor 60 and 60 SE have mono sound.

=== Memory ===
Honor 60 and 60 SE are sold in 8/128, 8/256 and 12/256 GB configurations.

Honor 60 Pro is sold in configurations of 8/256 and 12/256 GB.

=== Software ===
The smartphones of the line were released on Magic UI 5.0 based on Android 11. Later, they were updated to Magic UI 7.1 based on Android 13.
