= Honor 30 =

Smartphone made by Huawei

Honor 30 Honor 30 Pro Honor 30 Pro+

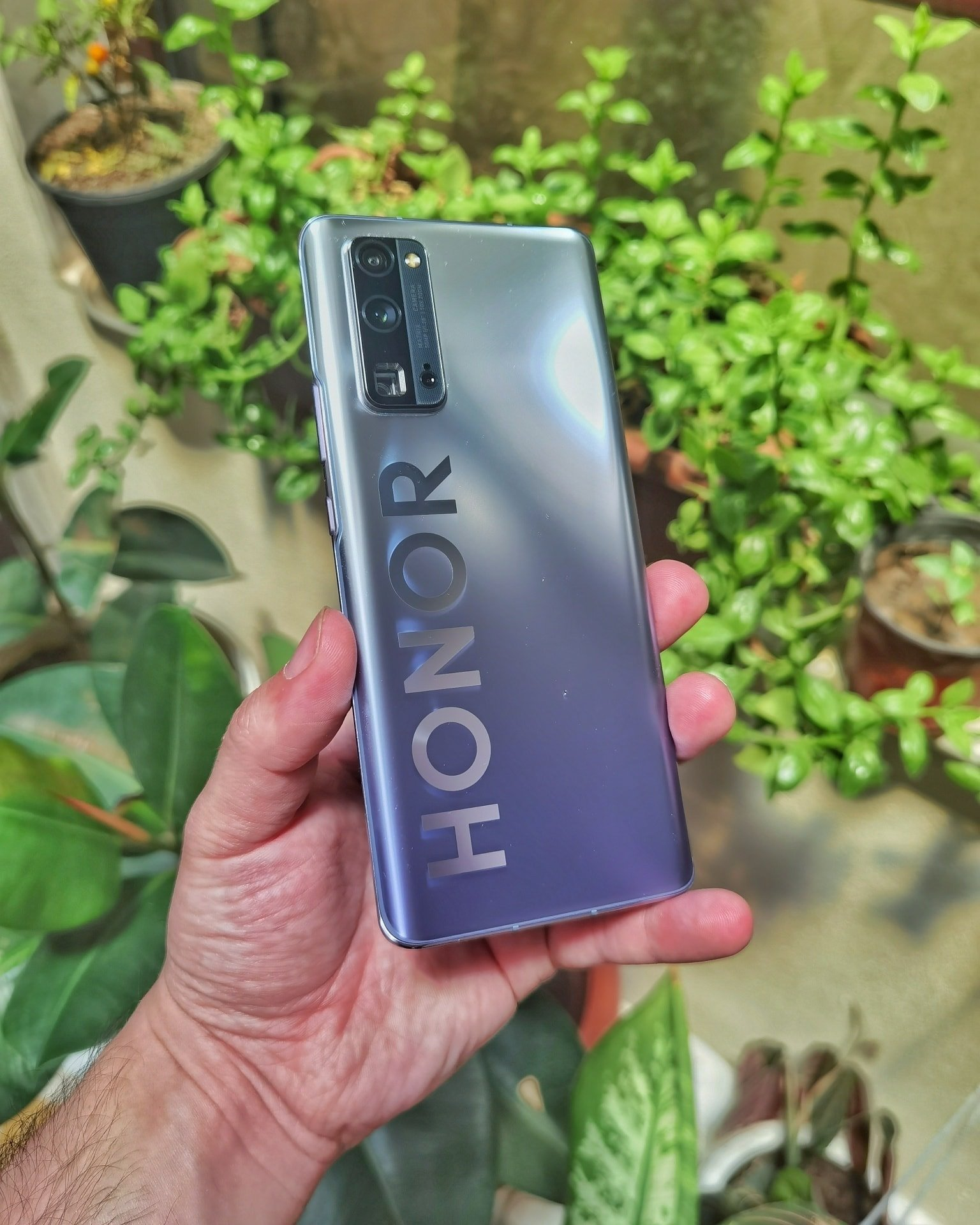
- Honor 30 back cover
- Brand: Honor
- Manufacturer: Huawei
- Type: Slate
- Series: HONOR series
- First released: April 15, 2020; 6 years ago (release time)
- Predecessor: Honor 20
- Successor: Honor 50
- Compatible networks: 5G NR/LTE Advanced/LTE-FDD/HSPA/CDMA /GSM: 'Main card: 5G NR:n1/n3/n41 (2496~2690MHz)/n77/n78/n79; TD-LTE: B34/B38/B39/ B40/B41 (2496~2690MHz); FDD LTE: B1/B2/B3/B4/B5/B6/B8/B9/B18/B19/B26; WCDMA: B1/B2/B4/B5/B6/B8/B19; CDMA (choose one of the primary and secondary cards): BC0 (only for China Telecom (Mainland China + Macau)); GSM: B2/B3/B5/B8; 'Secondary card: TD-LTE: B34/B38/B39/B40/B41 (2496~2690MHz); FDD LTE: B1/B2/B3/B4/B5/B6/B8/B9/B18/B19/B26; WCDMA: B1/B2/B4/B5/ B6/B8/B19; CDMA: BC0 (only China Telecom (Mainland China + Macau)); GSM: B2/B3/B5/B8;
- Dimensions: List: Honor 30: 160.3 mm (6.31 in) height 74.2 mm (2.92 in) Width 8.1 mm (0.32 in) Thickness Honor 30 Pro/Honor 30 Pro+: 160 mm (6.3 in) Height 73 mm (2.9 in) Width 8.38 mm (0.330 in) Thickness
- Weight: Honor 30: 185 g (6.5 oz); Honor 30 Pro: 186 g (6.6 oz); Honor 30 Pro+: 190 g (6.7 oz)
- Operating system: Magic UI 3.1.1 based on Android 10 (system version)
- System-on-chip: 'Honor 30: Kirin 985; Honor 30 Pro/Honor 30 Pro+: Kirin 990 5G
- CPU: List: Honor 30: 1 * Cortex-A76 Based 2.58GHz + 3 * Cortex-A76 Based 2.40GHz + 4 * Cortex-A55 1.84GHz Honor 30 Pro/Honor 30 Pro+: 2 * Cortex-A76 Based 2.86GHz + 2 * Cortex-A76 Based 2.36GHz + 4 * Cortex-A55 1.95GHz
- GPU: Honor 30: Mali-G77MP8; Honor 30 Pro/Honor 30 Pro+: Mali-G76MP16
- Memory: 30: 6/8 GB; 30 Pro: 8 GB; 30 Pro+: 8/12 GB; LPDDR4X
- Storage: Honor 30/Honor 30 Pro: 128/256 GB; Honor 30 Pro+: 256 GB; UFS 3.0
- Battery: All models: non-removable, Li-Po 4000 mAh; 30 & 30 Pro: 40W fast charging, fast wireless 27W charging, 5W reverse charging 30 Pro+: 40W fast charging, 25W fast wireless charging, 5W reverse charging
- Rear camera: List: Honor 30: 40-megapixel super-sensitive camera (wide-angle, f/1.8) + 8-megapixel ultra-wide-angle camera (f/2.4) + 8-megapixel telephoto camera ( f/3.4, OIS) + 2-megapixel macro camera (f/2.4) Honor 30 Pro: 40-megapixel super-sensitive camera (wide-angle, f/1.8, AF) + 16-megapixel Ultra-wide-angle camera (f/2.2) + 8-megapixel telephoto camera (f/3.4, AF, OIS) Honor 30 Pro+: 50-megapixel super-sensitive camera (wide-angle, f/1.9, AF) + 16-megapixel ultra-wide-angle camera (f/2.2, AF) + 8-megapixel telephoto camera (f/3.4, AF, OIS)
- Front camera: Honor 30: 32-megapixel camera (f/2.0); Honor 30 Pro/Honor 30 Pro+: 32-megapixel camera (f/2.0) + 8 million Pixel camera (f/2.2)
- Display: Honor 30: 6.53 inches, 2400x1080 FHD+, OLED; Honor 30 Pro/Honor 30 Pro+: 6.57 inches, 2340x1080 90Hz OLED
- Sound: USB-C
- Connectivity: Bluetooth5.1, 802.11 a/b/g/n/ac (wave2), MIMO, VHT160 Wifi
- Data inputs: List: Honor 30: gravity sensor, fingerprint sensor, gyroscope, compass, NFC, ambient light sensor, proximity light sensor Honor 30 Pro/Honor 30 Pro+ : gravity sensor, fingerprint sensor, gyroscope, compass, NFC, ambient light sensor, proximity light sensor, infrared sensor
- Other: Fingerprint scanner (built-in under the display), proximity sensor, light sensor, accelerometer, gyroscope, compass

The Honor 30 is a smartphone made by Huawei under their Honor sub-brand. It is a successor of the Huawei Honor 20 within the Huawei Honor series. On 15 April 2020, Honor completed its Chinese launch of the new Honor 30 series of smartphones, adding three new devices to its premium flagship lineup of devices. All the new phones are 5G capable and inherit the leading edge custom RYYB camera sensors. The Honor 30 is powered by the new Kirin 985 chipset, making this the first public showing of the new silicon. The Honor 30 Pro and Pro+ are powered by the well-known Kirin 990 5G chipset. The HONOR 30 Pro and Pro+ share a similar form factor to the Honor 30, but differ in terms of the industrial design, most notably because of the usage of a curved screen.

== Specifications ==
=== Hardware ===
The Honor 30 has a HiSilicon Kirin 985 octa-core processor, a Mali-G77 MP10 GPU, and a 4000 mAh non-removable battery. It has a 6.53-inch “all-view” display LCD screen.

The phone has four rear cameras including a 40-megapixel main camera, an 18-megapixel super-wide-angle camera, a 2-megapixel depth camera, and an 8-megapixel (Periscope telephoto), PDAF, OIS, 5x optical zoom.

=== Software ===
The honor 30 launched with Android 10 and Magic UI 3, without Google Play Services.
