= Honor 8 =

Huawei smartphone

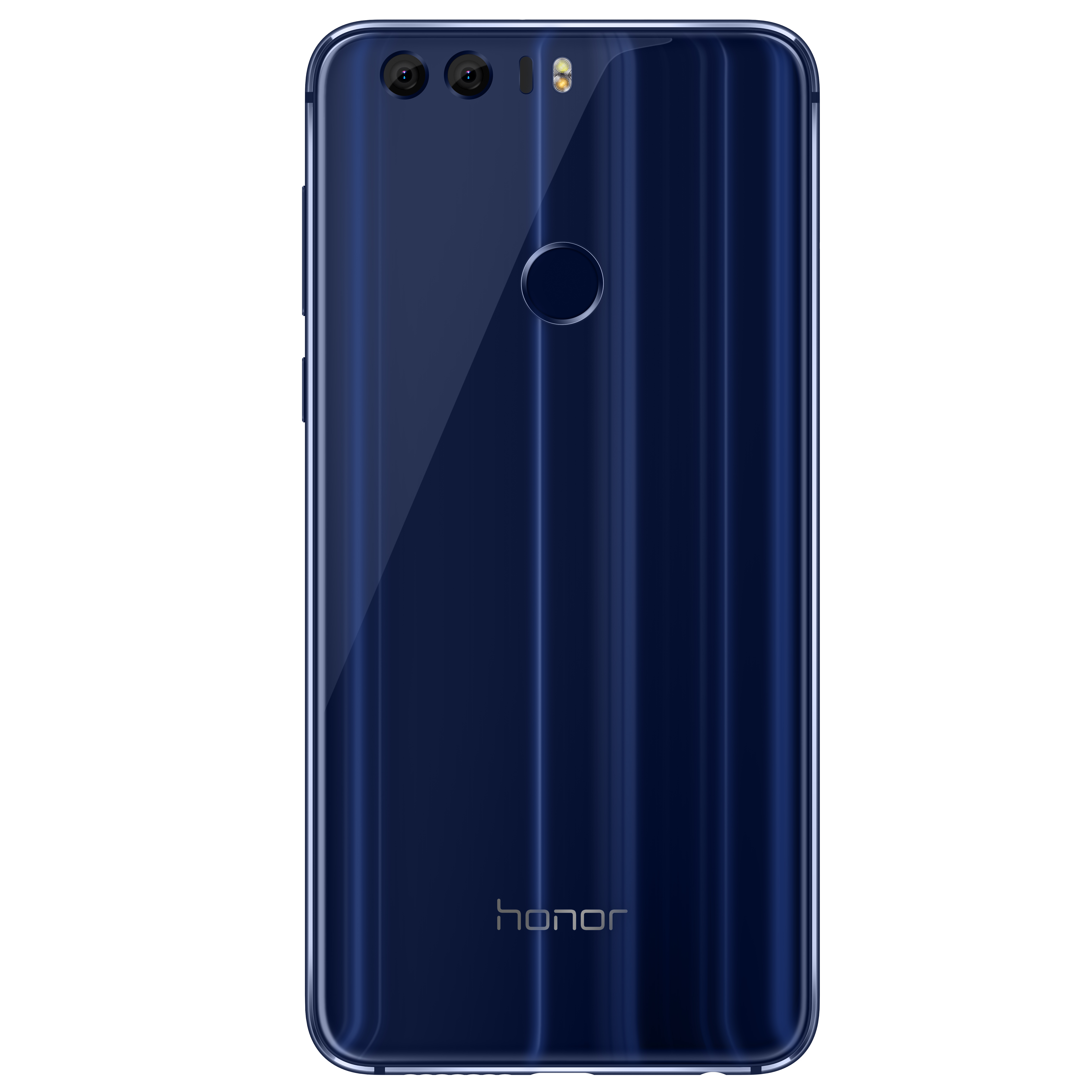
- Reverse side of the Honor 8
- Brand: Honor
- Manufacturer: Huawei
- Type: Touchscreen smartphone
- Predecessor: Huawei Honor 7
- Successor: Huawei Honor 8 Pro; Huawei Honor 9
- Related: Huawei Honor V8; Huawei Honor Note 8 Huawei Honor 8 Lite
- Form factor: Touchscreen
- Dimensions: 145.5 mm (5.73 in) H 71 mm (2.8 in) W 7.45 mm (0.293 in) D
- Weight: 153 g (5.4 oz)
- Operating system: Android 6.0 "Marshmallow", upgradable to 8.0 "Oreo"
- System-on-chip: Hisilicon Kirin 950
- CPU: Octa-core (4×2.3 GHz & 4×1.8 GHz)
- GPU: Mali-T880 MP4
- Memory: 4 GB LPDDR4 RAM
- Storage: 32GB/64GB
- Battery: 3000 mAh (typical)
- Other: Dual SIM
- Website: https://www.hihonor.com/global/products/smartphone/honor8/

The Honor 8 is the first flagship smartphone made by Huawei under their Honor sub-brand. It is a successor of the Huawei Honor 7 within the Huawei Honor series.

== Specifications ==
=== Hardware ===
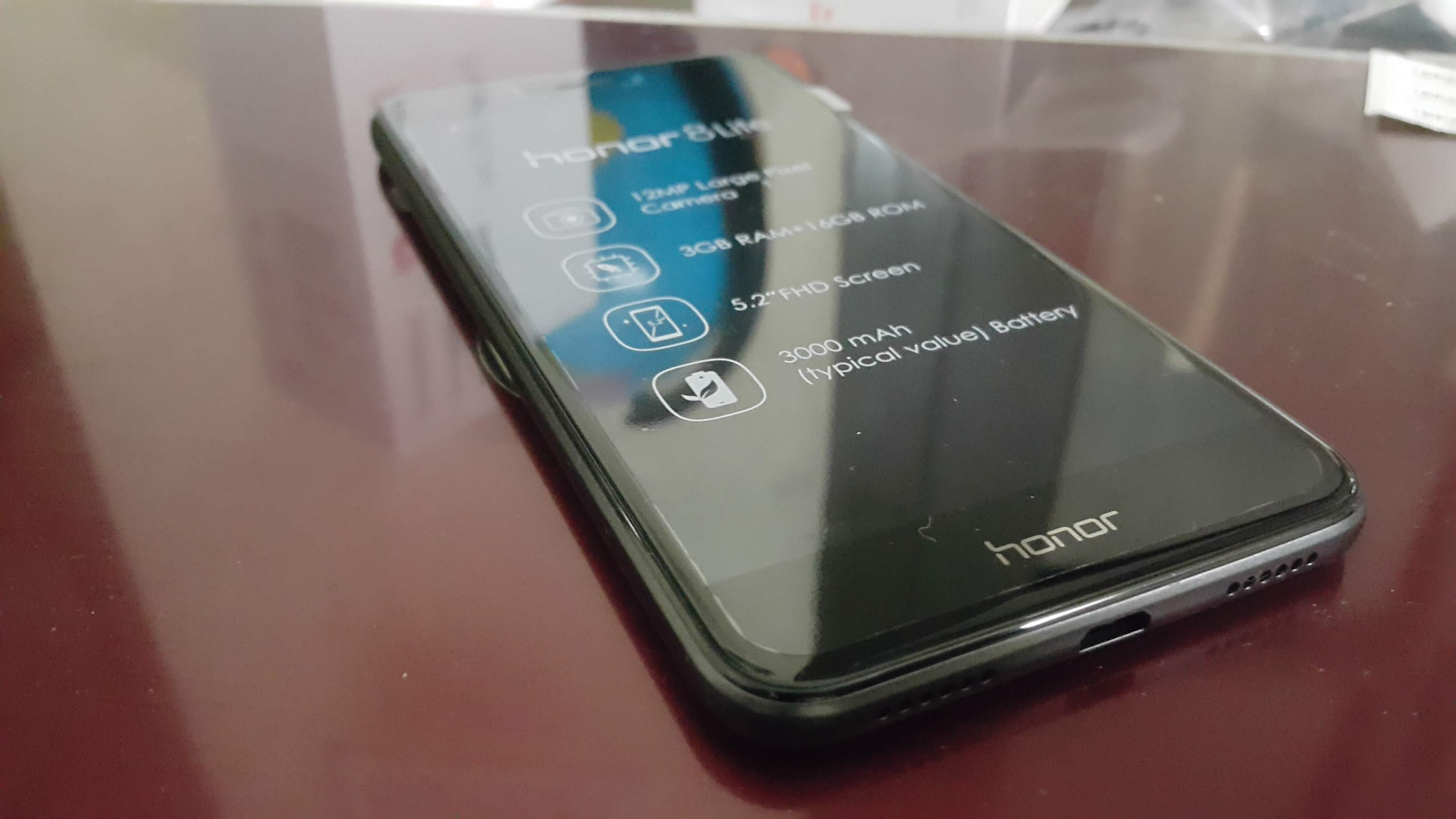
Huawei Honor 8 Lite

The Honor 8 is a smartphone made by Honor, a sub-brand of the Huawei Group, as part of the Huawei Honor series. It has an eight-core HiSilicon Kirin 950 processor, a Mali-T880 MP4 GPU, and a 3000 mAh (typical) battery. The phone comes with 32 or 64 gigabytes (GB) of storage and 4 GB LPDDR4 RAM. It has a 5.2-inch (13 cm), 2.5D glass liquid-crystal display (LCD) with 1080×1920 pixel resolution and "multilayer optical filming" to catch and reflect light.

The phone's dual 12 megapixel (MP) camera setup is flush to the phone's reverse glass panel. One of the rear cameras has a lens to capture details, and the other has an RGB sensor to record color data. The two resulting images are then merged. The camera app has a "Wide Aperture" mode, among others, which allows users to adjust the focus and depth of field after a photograph has been taken. The Honor 8 also has a forward-facing 8 MP camera.

Other features include an earpiece with built-in notification LED, a fingerprint sensor on the phone's back side, an infrared port allowing the phone to act as a universal remote, dual SIM-card support in select versions, a USB 2.0 with Type-C interface connector, and QuickCharge support. In addition to scanning fingerprints, the fingerprint sensor serves as a customizable "smart button", enabling users to open apps or scroll up or down the screen. Users can also tap their knuckles on the screen to take screenshots or recordings, or draw letters to open specific applications.

The Honor 8 measures 145.5 millimetres (5.73 in) by 71 millimetres (2.8 in) by 7.45 millimetres (0.293 in) and weighs 153 grams (5.4 oz). It has an aluminum bezel, metal trim, and glass back. In China, Honor 8 is available in the following colors: midnight black, sapphire blue, sunrise gold, sakura pink, and pearl white. Some hardware versions are only available in select colors. In the United States, Honor 8 is available in midnight black, sapphire blue, and pearl white. In November 2016, Honor announced that sakura pink, which was initially available only in China, would be sold in Europe.

=== Software ===
The Honor 8 launched with Android Marshmallow with Honor's Emotion UI interface (EMUI 4.0).

On February 11, 2017, Honor began to officially roll out EMUI 5, which is based on Android Nougat, to the Honor 8. According to Honor, the Honor 8 was not supposed to receive Android Oreo due to hardware limitations. However, in 2018, Huawei announced that the Honor 8 will be getting the Android Oreo update. The final firmware update, which included Android Oreo was released September 2018.

== Release ==
Honor 8 launched in China in July 2016. Registrations were accepted until July 18; sales began on July 19. Honor confirmed more than 5 million registrations, or indications of interest, within four days of the phone's launch in China.

Honor hosted launch events in San Francisco and Paris in August 2016 to debut the Honor 8 in the United States and Europe, respectively. The phone launched in the U.S. on August 16, becoming the first flagship model (and second overall, following the Honor 5X earlier in 2016) marketed by Honor in the country. The "unlocked" phone is compatible with GSM networks (AT&T and T-Mobile). Honor sells the phone directly to customers and select online retailers such as Amazon.com and Best Buy, rather than through wireless carriers. The sapphire blue model was exclusive to Best Buy for the first 60 days of the phone's availability in the United States.

Honor 8's launch in Sweden included a world record attempt to complete the highest smartphone livestream. On September 5, the phone was placed in a weather balloon at Swedish Space Corporation's Esrange Space Center and carried 18,425 metres (60,449 ft) into the air. The record for highest smartphone livestream, which was verified by Guinness World Records, was achieved despite the weather balloon's failure to reach the 30,000-metre (98,000 ft) goal.

Honor began accepting pre-orders in the Middle East region on August 24, 2016; sales started on September 1.

Sales volume of Honor 8 worldwide exceeded 1.5 million units within the first two months of its launch.

== Promotion ==
According to Honor's president George Zhao, the brand's U.S. launch strategy replicates the successful campaign in China by highlighting Honor 8's "cool design, serious components, [and] appealing prices" and by targeting millennials. To appeal to younger users, Honor focuses on the phone's "unique" aesthetics, high-performing dual-lens cameras, and fingerprint sensor.

Gift card rebate offers were available to U.S. customers who pre-ordered the Honor 8 through the brand's website or select retailers by September 3. In addition to its standard one-year warranty, Honor has offered an extended warranty to fix glass covering damages during the first three months after purchase. Honor has also guaranteed continuous software updates for the Honor 8 for at least two years, in an attempt to attract consumers.

== Reception ==
Alex Dobie of Android Central called the Honor 8 an appealing phone with a "less industrial" and "more elegant" appearance than its predecessor. Business Insider's Jeff Dunn said of the phone and its price: "Huawei's newest phone looks great, feels great, and runs with aplomb. There's a sense of heft and flair to it that cannot come from something you'd call 'cheap.'" Cherlynn Low of the technology blog network Engadget complimented the phone's camera and design.

Honor 8 has been compared to the Samsung Galaxy S7 and iPhone. Fast Company's Harry McCracken, who tested a "pre-release" version of the phone, was impressed and called the Honor 8 worthy competitor to the more expensive Samsung Galaxy S7. Matthew Miller of ZDNet appreciated the phone's appearance and value. He called the model a "fingerprint magnet", but opined, "phones like this are really going to make people question paying double for the latest Samsung Galaxy or Apple iPhone".

Honor 8 earned "editor's choice" awards from the aforementioned Android Central as well as from Tom's Guide and was named the year's best mobile phone in the "middle class" category by Ljud & Bild. The Honor 8 also made it onto Android Police's list of the six best midrange smartphones of 2016, standing alongside the Moto Z Play, the OnePlus 3 and 3T, ZTE Axon 7, and BlackBerry DTEK60.

== See also ==
- List of Huawei phones
- Honor (brand)
- Honor 8x
- Huawei Nova 3i
- Huawei Mate 9
- Huawei Mate 10
- Huawei Mate 10 Lite
- Huawei Mate 20
