= Huawei U8800 =

Huawei Ideos X5 Android smartphone

Huawei U8800 Ideos X5
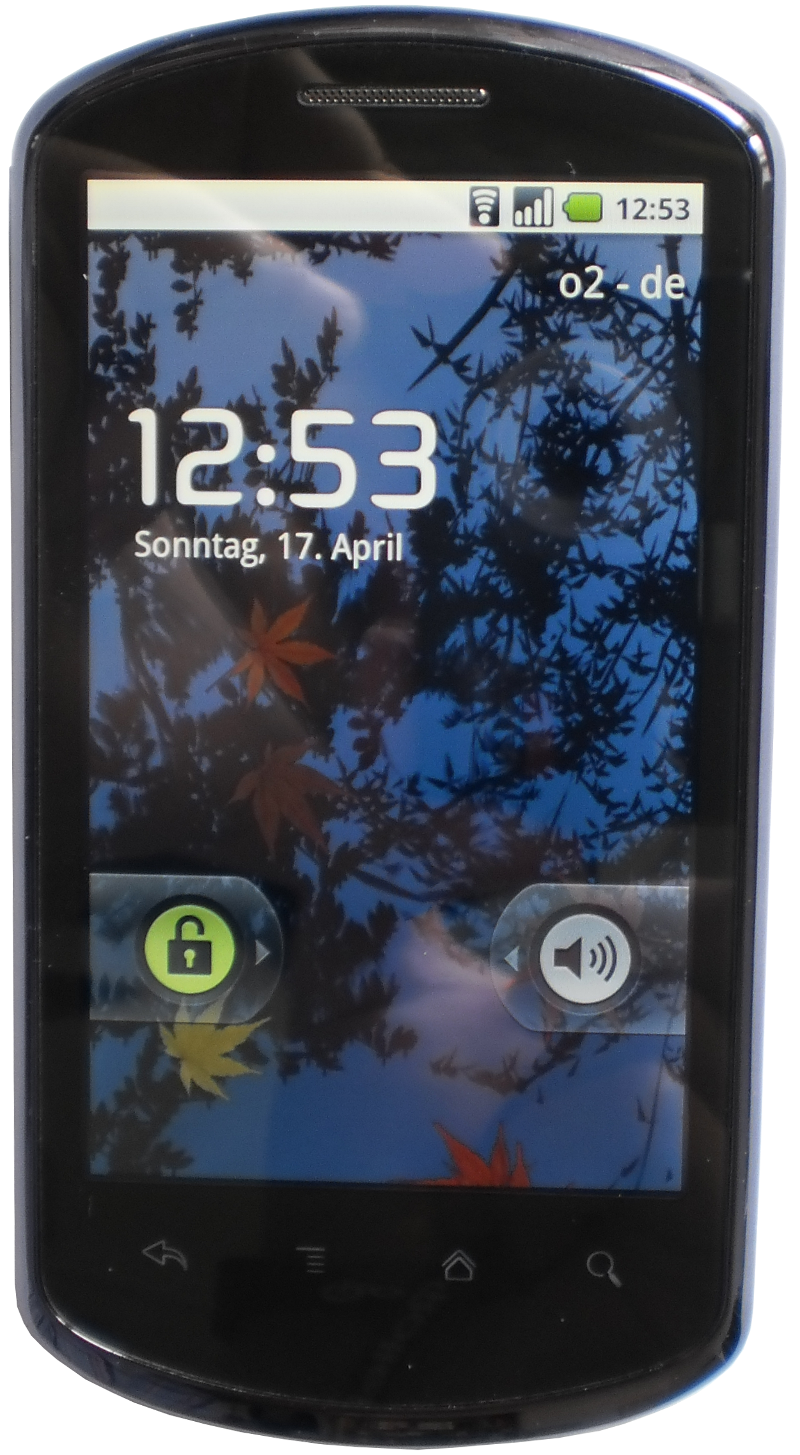
- Manufacturer: Huawei
- Type: Smartphone
- Availability by region: Germany March 2011; 15 years ago
- Form factor: bar
- Dimensions: 120 mm (4.7 in) H 62 mm (2.4 in) W 11.6 mm (0.46 in) D
- Weight: 0.130 kg (0.29 lb)
- Operating system: Android 2.2.2, official upgrade to 2.3.5
- CPU: Qualcomm MSM7230 800 MHz Scorpion (Snapdragon)
- GPU: Adreno 205
- Memory: 512 MB (RAM), 320MB available
- Storage: 2 GB
- Removable storage: microSD up to 32 GB
- Battery: Li-ion 1500 mAh
- Rear camera: 5.0 MP
- Display: 3.8 in (97 mm) 800×480 px
- Connectivity: HSPA+, Bluetooth 2.1, Micro-USB 2.0, 3.5 mm audio jack, aGPS, Wi-Fi 802.11 b/g/n
- Data inputs: Multi-touch capacitive touchscreen, accelerometer

The Huawei U8800 Ideos X5 is a touchscreen mobile phone running Android, and which targets the mid-high phone market. It has a typical Android design. It is available for AT&T and runs on 3G. It features a 3.8-inch WVGA touchscreen, a 800Mhz central processor, and a 5-megapixel camera.

== See also ==
- Galaxy Nexus
- Emotion UI
- List of Android smartphones
