= Honor 8 Pro =

Huawei smartphone

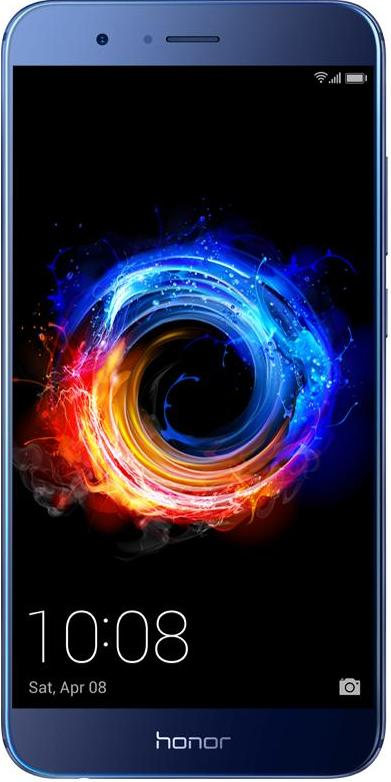
- Brand: Honor
- Manufacturer: Huawei
- Type: Touchscreen smartphone
- Availability by region: April 2017
- Predecessor: Huawei Honor 8
- Form factor: Touchscreen
- Dimensions: 157×77.5×6.97 mm (6.181×3.051×0.274 in)
- Weight: 184 g (6 oz)r (including battery)
- Operating system: Android 7.0 Nougat, EMUI 5.1
- CPU: Kirin 960 octa-core (4×1.8GHz Cortex A53 + 4×2.4GHz Cortex A73)
- GPU: Mali-G71
- Memory: 6 GB RAM
- Storage: 64GB/128GB
- Removable storage: microSD (128 GB Max)
- Battery: 4000 mAh, non removable
- Rear camera: Dual 12 MP, f/2.2, laser autofocus, video 4K, LED flash
- Front camera: 8 MP, f/2.0
- Display: 5.7” QHD (1,440 × 2,560 pixel)
- Connectivity: Hybrid Dual SIM (nano + nano/microSD), LTE Cat.6, Wi-Fi a/b/g/n/ac (2,4/5 GHz), Bluetooth 4.2, GPS, NFC, USB 2.0 Type-C
- Other: Hall sensor, Infrared sensor, Fingerprint sensor, Proximity sensor, Ambient light sensor, Digital compass, Gravity sensor, Gyroscope, Status indicator
- Website: www.hihonor.com/global/products/smartphone/honor8pro/

The Honor 8 Pro is a smartphone made by Huawei under their Honor sub-brand. It was introduced in April 2017 as a successor to the Huawei Honor 8 within the Huawei Honor series. The phone is known as Honor V9 in China.

== Specifications ==
The Honor 8 Pro is a smartphone made by Honor, a sub-brand under the Huawei Group, as part of the Huawei Honor series. It has an octa-core HiSilicon Kirin 960 processor (four 2.4 GHz cores and four 1.8 GHz cores), a Mali-G71 MP8 GPU, and a non-removable 4000 mAh battery. The phone comes with 128 gigabytes (GB) of storage and 6 GB RAM. It has a 5.7-inch (14 cm), LTPS IPS liquid-crystal display (LCD) capacitive touchscreen with 2560x1440 pixel resolution and a Gorilla Glass 3 covering. The phone's dual 12 megapixel (MP) camera setup features laser autofocus and phase detection. Dual SIM is also included. The Honor 8 Pro measures 157 millimetres (6.2 in) by 77.5 millimetres (3.05 in) by 6.97 millimetres (0.274 in) and weighs 184 grams (6.5 oz). Available colors include platinum gold, midnight black, and navy blue.

The Honor 8 Pro launched with Android 7.0 (Nougat) with Huawei's Emotion UI interface (EMUI 5.1).

== Release ==
Preorders started to be accepted in early April in France, Germany, Italy, Spain, Switzerland, and the United Kingdom. The phone formally launched on April 20, 2017. In the United Kingdom, the phone was made available for pre-order from Huawei's small store. Honor planned to sell the phone throughout Europe, but not within Australia or the United States, as of May 2017.

The Honor 8 Pro launched in India on July 6, 2017, and was sold exclusively through Amazon India. Huawei had previously hosted a soft launch event for the phone in Delhi. The Honor 8 Pro was set to launch in Malaysia in July 2017.

The Honor 8 Pro's packaging features a box that converts into a Google Cardboard head-mounted display for virtual reality. The phone also comes with the virtual reality software Jaunt VR pre-installed.

== Reception ==
Overall, initial reviews of the Honor 8 Pro were positive, averaging 8.1 out of 10. TechAdvisor's Henry Burrell awarded the phone 3.5 out of 5 stars. Luke Johnson of TechRadar rated the Honor 8 Pro four out of five stars. Andy Boxall of DigitalTrends rated the phone 4 out of 5 stars. Reviews of the phone noted its value, long battery life, metal body, and fast performance. Rajiv Makhni of Hindustan Times, Andrew Orlowski of The Register and ZDNet's Sandra Vogel wrote that the phone pricing is lower than for flagship phones with similar hardware and features. Reviews did however note that the phone did not have contract options in the UK at the time of launch, and that other phones offered better design.
