= Proximity =

Proximity may refer to:

- Distance, a numerical description of how far apart objects are
- Proxemics, the study of human spatial requirements and the effects of population density
- Proximity (2000 film), an action/thriller film
- Proximity (2020 film), a science fiction drama film
- Proximity fuze, a fuze that detonates an explosive device automatically when the distance to the target becomes smaller than a predetermined value
- Proximity sensor, a sensor able to detect the presence of nearby objects without any physical contact
- Proximity space, or nearness space, in topology
- Proximity talks, a diplomatic approach in which a neutral intermediary communicates between two opposing sides that agree to participate in the same conference but refuse direct contact
- Proximity (horse)
- Proximity, one of the principles of grouping in Gestalt psychology
