= Huawei Honor 6 =

Mid-range Android phones manufactured by Huawei released in 2014

Honor 6 Honor 6 Plus
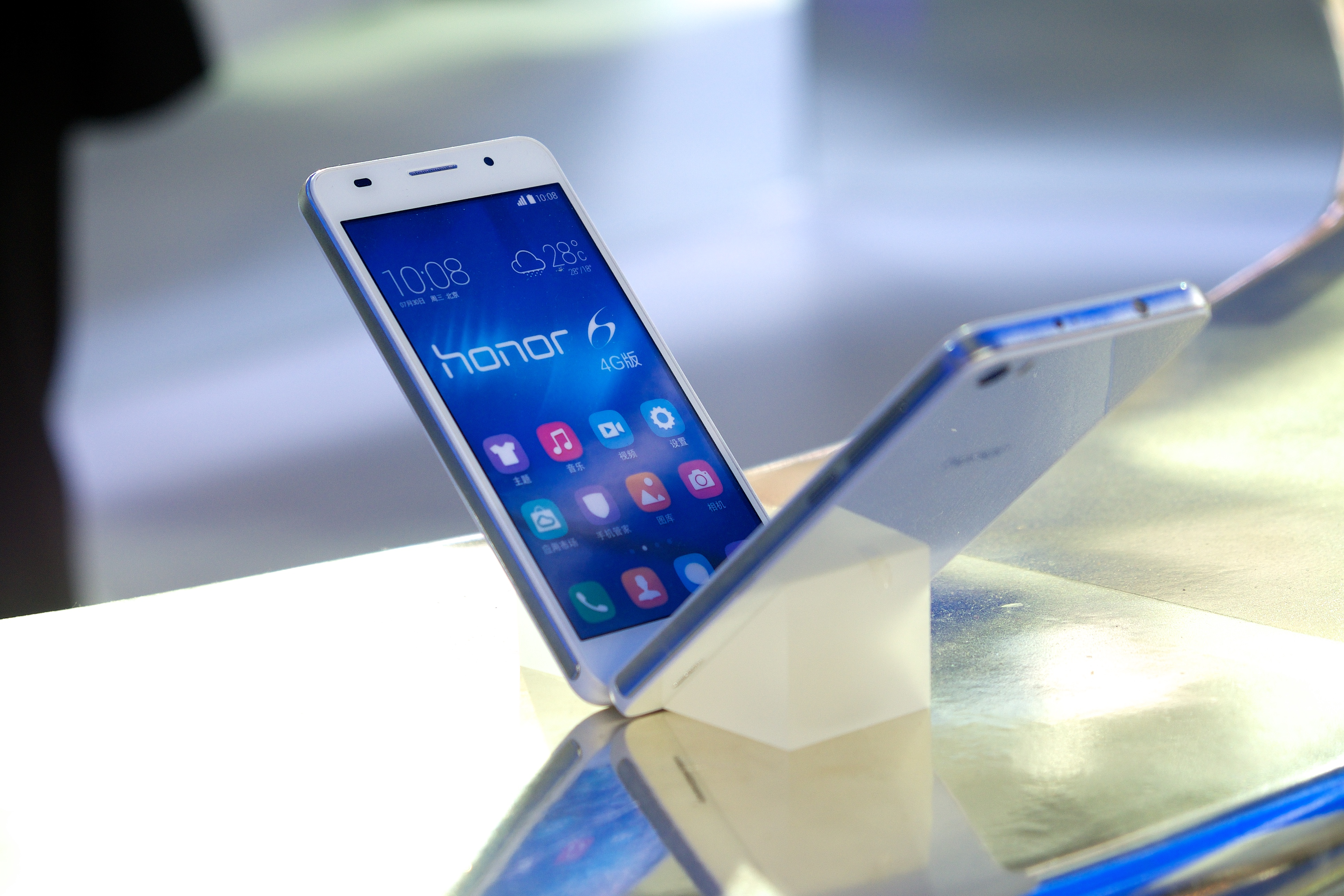
- Honor 6 on MWC 2015
- Brand: Honor
- Manufacturer: Huawei
- Type: 6: smartphone 6 Plus: phablet
- Series: Honor N
- First released: 6: August 2014; 6 Plus: December 2014
- Predecessor: Huawei Honor 3
- Successor: Honor 7
- Related: Huawei Ascend P7
- Form factor: Slate
- Colors: 6: Black, White; 6 Plus: Black, White, Gold
- Dimensions: 6: 139.6 mm (5.50 in) H; 69.7 mm (2.74 in) W; 7.5 mm (0.30 in) D; 6 Plus: 150.5 mm (5.93 in) H; 71.9 mm (2.83 in) W; 8.5 mm (0.33 in) D
- Weight: 6: 130 g (4.6 oz); 6 Plus: 165 g (5.8 oz)
- Operating system: Original: 6: Android 4.4.2 "KitKat" with Emotion UI 2.3; 6 Plus: Android 4.4.2 "KitKat" with EMUI 3.0; Current: Android 6.0 "Marshmallow" with EMUI 4.0
- System-on-chip: 6: HiSilicon Kirin 920; 6 Plus: HiSilicon Kirin 925
- CPU: 6: Octa-core (4×1.7 GHz Cortex-A15 & 4×1.3 GHz Cortex-A7); 6 Plus: Octa-core (4×1.8 GHz Cortex-A15 & 4×1.3 GHz Cortex-A7)
- GPU: 6: Mali-T624 MP4; 6 Plus: Mali-T628 MP4
- Memory: 3 GB RAM
- Storage: 16 or 32 GB
- Removable storage: microSDXC up to 128 GB
- SIM: 6: single SIM (Micro-SIM) or dual SIM (Micro-SIM); 6 Plus: single SIM (Micro-SIM) or hybrid dual SIM (Nano-SIM + Micro-SIM)
- Battery: Removable, Li-Po; 6: 3100 mAh; 6 Plus: 3600 mAh
- Rear camera: 6: 13 MP, f/2.0, 28 mm (wide), AF; 6 Plus: 8 MP, f/2.0, AF + 2 MP (depth); All models: 2-LED flash, HDR; Video: 1080p@30fps
- Front camera: 6: 5 MP, f/2.4 6 Plus: 8 MP, f/2.4 Video: 1080p@30fps
- Display: 6: 5 in (130 mm), 445 ppi 6 Plus: 5.5 in (140 mm) 401 ppi Both: IPS LCD, 1080 × 1920 pixels (Full HD), 16:9
- Sound: Front earpiece, rear mono speaker
- Model: 6: H60-L01, H60-L02, H60-L03, H60-L04, H60-L11, H60-L12, H60-L21, HW-H60-J1; 6 Plus: PE-CL00, PE-UL00, PE-TL00M, PE-TL10, PE-TL20
- Codename: 6: Mogolia; 6 Plus: Pine

The Honor 6 and Honor 6 Plus are Android smartphones produced by Huawei under Honor sub-brand. The Honor 6 was released in August 2014, while the Honor 6 Plus was released in December 2014.

== Design ==
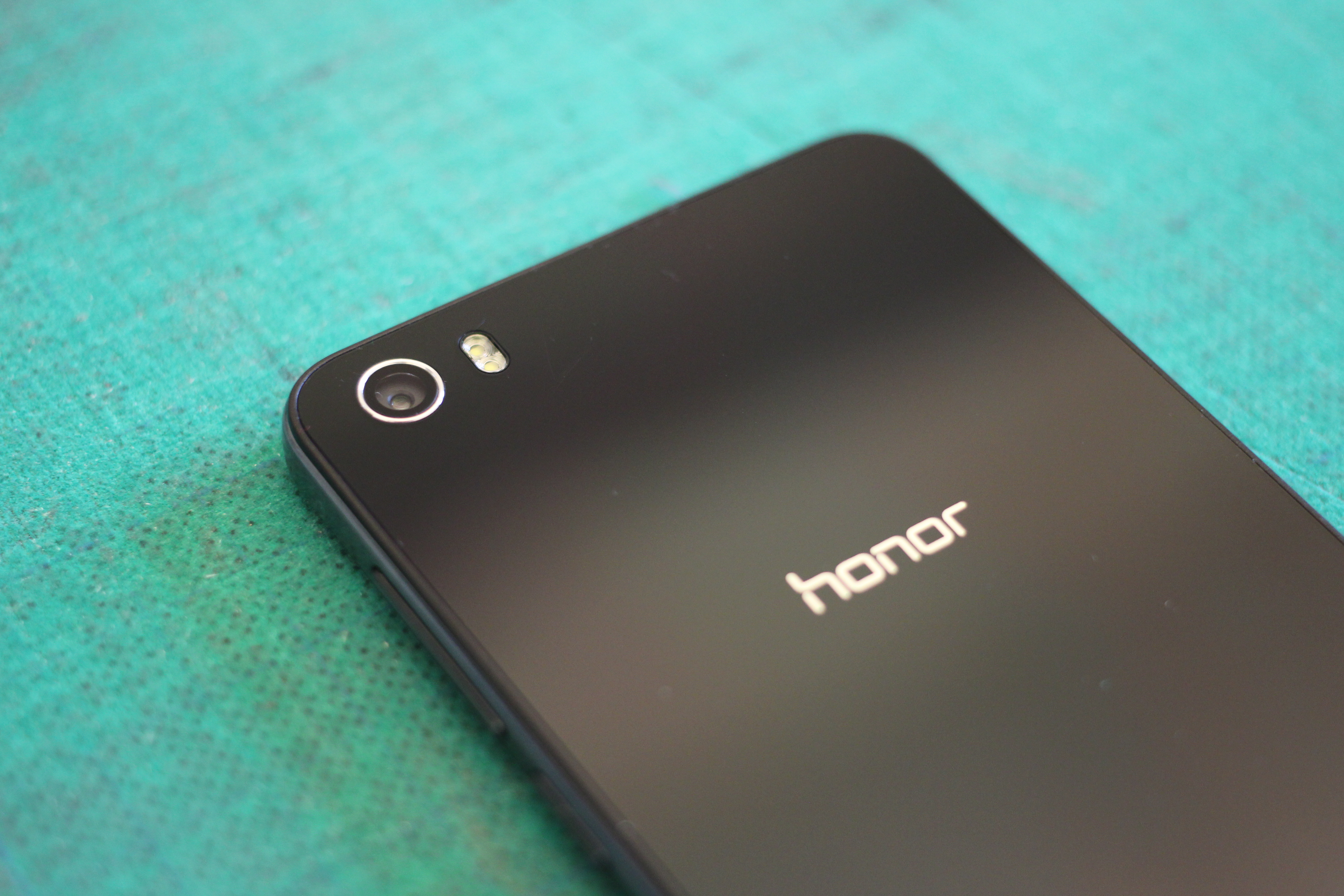
The back of the Honor 6 in black

The front and back are made of glass. The frame of the Honor 6 is made of matte plastic, while the frame of the Honor 6 Plus is made of aluminum.

On the bottom of the smartphones, there is the microUSB port and a microphone, while on the top, there is the 3.5 mm audio jack, an additional microphone and the IR blaster. On the right, there is the volume rocker, the power button and a flap covering the single or dual SIM slots and a microSD slot on the Honor 6 or two trays with single or dual SIM slots and a microSD slot on the Honor 6 Plus. On the front, there is the screen with an earpiece speaker, a proximity/ambient light sensor and a front-facing camera above it. On the back, there is the logo, a single on the Honor 6 or a dual on the Honor 6 Plus rear-facing camera, a dual-LED flash, and a speaker.

The Honor 6 was available in black and white color options, while the Honor 6 Plus, additionally, was available in gold color option.

== Specifications ==
=== Hardware ===
The Honor 6 is the second phone by Honor which is equipped with the HiSilicon Kirin 920 SoC, while the Honor 6 Plus features the Kirin 925 SoC. The phones feature 3 GB of RAM and 16 GB or 32 GB of internal storage. The smartphones are connectable via Bluetooth 4.0, Wi-Fi 802.11 a/b/g/n and 2G/3G/4G LTE.

Both smartphones feature IPS LCDs with a Full HD (1080 × 1920 pixels) resolution and a 16:9 aspect ratio. The display of the Honor 6 has a 5.0" diagonal, while the display of the Honor 6 Plus has a 5.5" diagonal.

The Honor 6 features a single 13 MP rear camera with an f/2.0 aperture and autofocus, and 5 MP front camera. However, the Honor 6 Plus features a rear dual-camera setup, which has an 8 MP primary camera with an f/2.0 aperture and autofocus, paired with a 2 MP depth sensor. Also the Honor 6 Plus features an 8 MP front camera.

=== Software ===
The Honor 6 was released with Emotion UI 2.3, while the Honor 6 Plus was released with EMUI 3.0. Both user interfaces are based on Android 4.4.2 "KitKat". Later, both devices were updated to EMUI 4.0 based on Android 6.0 "Marshmallow".
