= Huawei Honor 7 =

Huawei smartphone

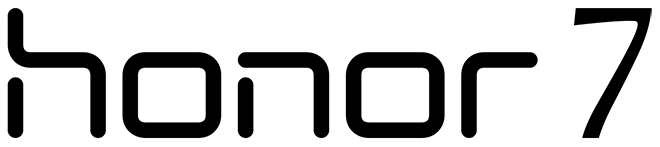

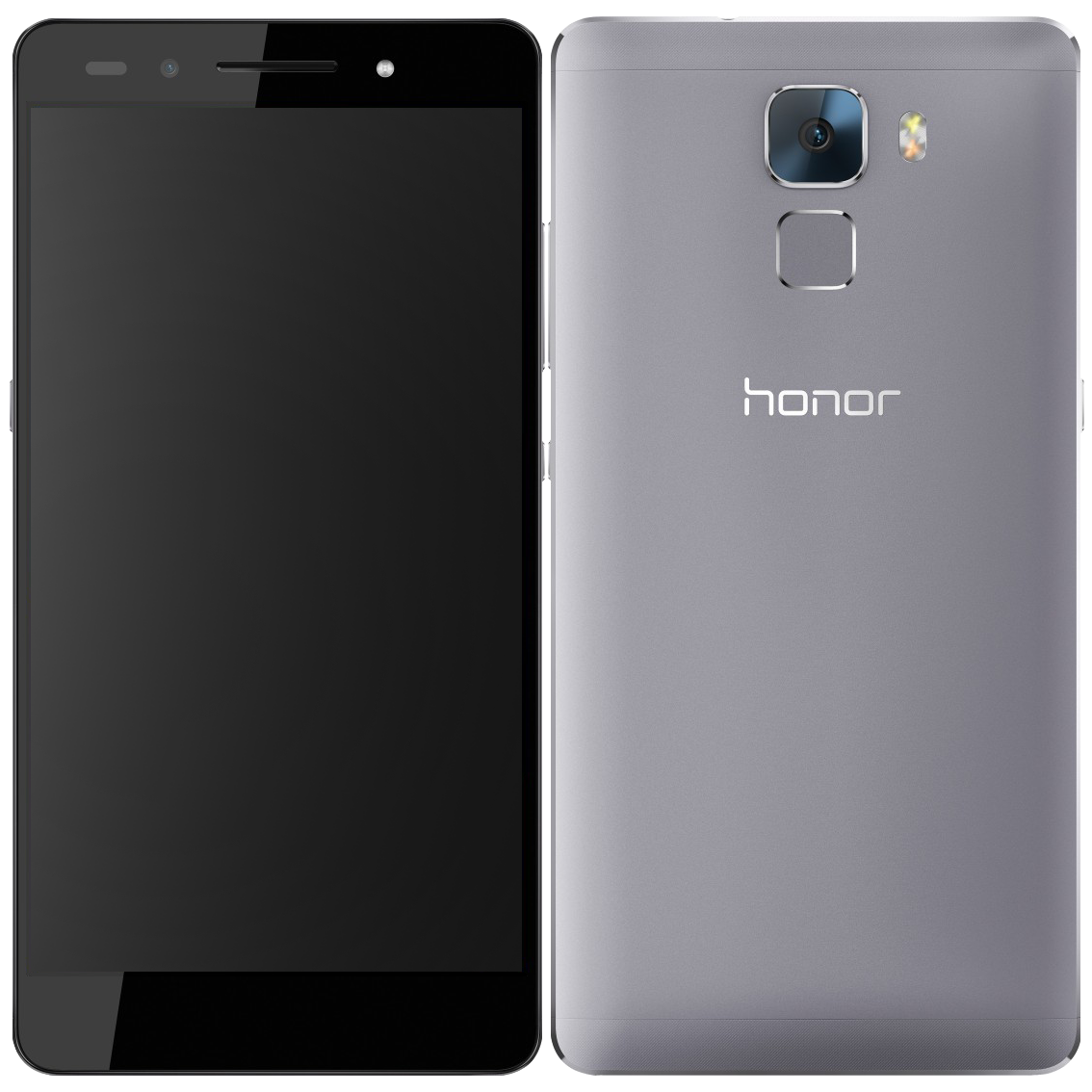
- Front and back of Honor 7
- Brand: Honor
- Manufacturer: Huawei
- Type: Touchscreen smartphone
- Series: Honor N
- First released: July 2015 (China); October 2015 (India)
- Predecessor: Huawei Honor 6
- Successor: Honor 8
- Related: Honor 7i
- Compatible networks: 2.5G GSM/GPRS/EDGE – 850, 900, 1800, 1900 MHz; 4G LTE Rel. 8 (UE Cat 4) - 1800, 2100, 2600, 800 MHz European
- Form factor: Touchscreen
- Dimensions: 143.20 mm (5.638 in) H 71.90 mm (2.831 in) W 8.50 mm (0.335 in) D
- Weight: 157 g (5.5 oz)
- Operating system: Android 5.0 Lollipop upgradeable to Android 6.0 Marshmallow
- System-on-chip: Hisilicon Kirin 935
- CPU: Octa-core (4×2.2 GHz Cortex-A53 + 4×1.5 GHz Cortex-A53)
- GPU: Mali-T628 MP4
- Memory: 3GB RAM
- Storage: 16/64GB
- Removable storage: microSD, up to 128GB
- Battery: Non-removable 3100 mAh battery (11.8 Wh)
- Rear camera: 20 megapixels (Sony IMX230) 1080p 5152 x 3888 pixels, Super night mode, Fast Focus, phase detection autofocus, dual-LED (dual tone) flash, video 1080p@30fps, HDR
- Front camera: 8 megapixels, front-faced soft light, panorama
- Display: 5.2 in (130 mm) IPS-NEO LCD capacitive touchscreen, 16M colors, 423 ppi (1080×1920)
- Connectivity: List: Wi-Fi :802.11 b/g/n/ac; GPS; Dual Sim DSDA; (market dependent); NFC (market dependent); Bluetooth 4.1; USBmicroUSB v2.0, USB Host
- Data inputs: Accelerometer, gyroscope, magnetometer, proximity sensor Compass
- Model: PLK-UL00
- Website: https://www.hihonor.com/global/products/smartphone/honor7/

The Huawei Honor 7 is a smartphone made by Huawei under their Honor sub-brand. It is a successor to the Huawei Honor 6, the flagship device under Honor brand for 2014. The models vary for different markets with a gold coloured, dual-sim variant with 64 GB storage capacity being exclusive to China. International model comes with 16 GB storage option and the Indian version hosts only single-sim capabilities.

== Overview ==
The Honor 7 features a full-metal body, 5.2-inch touchscreen, a 20 MP rear camera (Sony IMX230) and an 8 MP front camera. It is available three colors- gold, grey and silver; gold was originally exclusive to Chinese market. The gold version features a dual-sim capability, NFC and 64 GB of internal storage. The international version was available in grey and silver only, with 16 GB internal storage capacity. It also features a dual-sim functionality, but, like the gold version, only one SIM can be used if used in conjunction with a micro-SD to expand the storage capability. This version also lacks the NFC feature and the Indian version is the single-sim variant of the international version. The phone comes with a fingerprint sensor claimed to be intelligent and highly responsive. Another notable feature of the phone is the 'Smart' button, an additional hardware button that can be assigned to specific tasks making the device easier to use.

== Software ==
The Honor 7 ships with Android Lollipop with Huawei's Emotion UI (EMUI) 3.0. The camera interface has a few new features including the 'Good Food' mode that adds detail and crisps the images of food items. Many convenient tweaks have been made for single-handed use. The fingerprint reader is claimed to unlock the phone in 0.5 seconds and also includes additional software features that enable easier use of the device.

== Release ==
The phone was announced in China in July 2015. It was introduced in the United Kingdom in August 2015 and was announced in India in October 2015. Huawei partnerered with Flipkart for the release of the device and it was announced as a 'Flipkart Exclusive' product.

== Versions ==
Huawei has unveiled a new edition of its acclaimed handset Honor 7. The new version has been named Honor 7 Enhanced and it comes with Android 6.0 Marshmallow. The difference with regard to the previous edition is not only the updated operating system but also the introduction of the 32 GB internal storage. The Honor 7 had 16 and 64 GB options and an Android 5.0 Lollipop as OS. The other specifications have still been kept the same.
