= Huawei Mate XT =

Smartphone by Huawei

Huawei Mate XT Ultimate Design
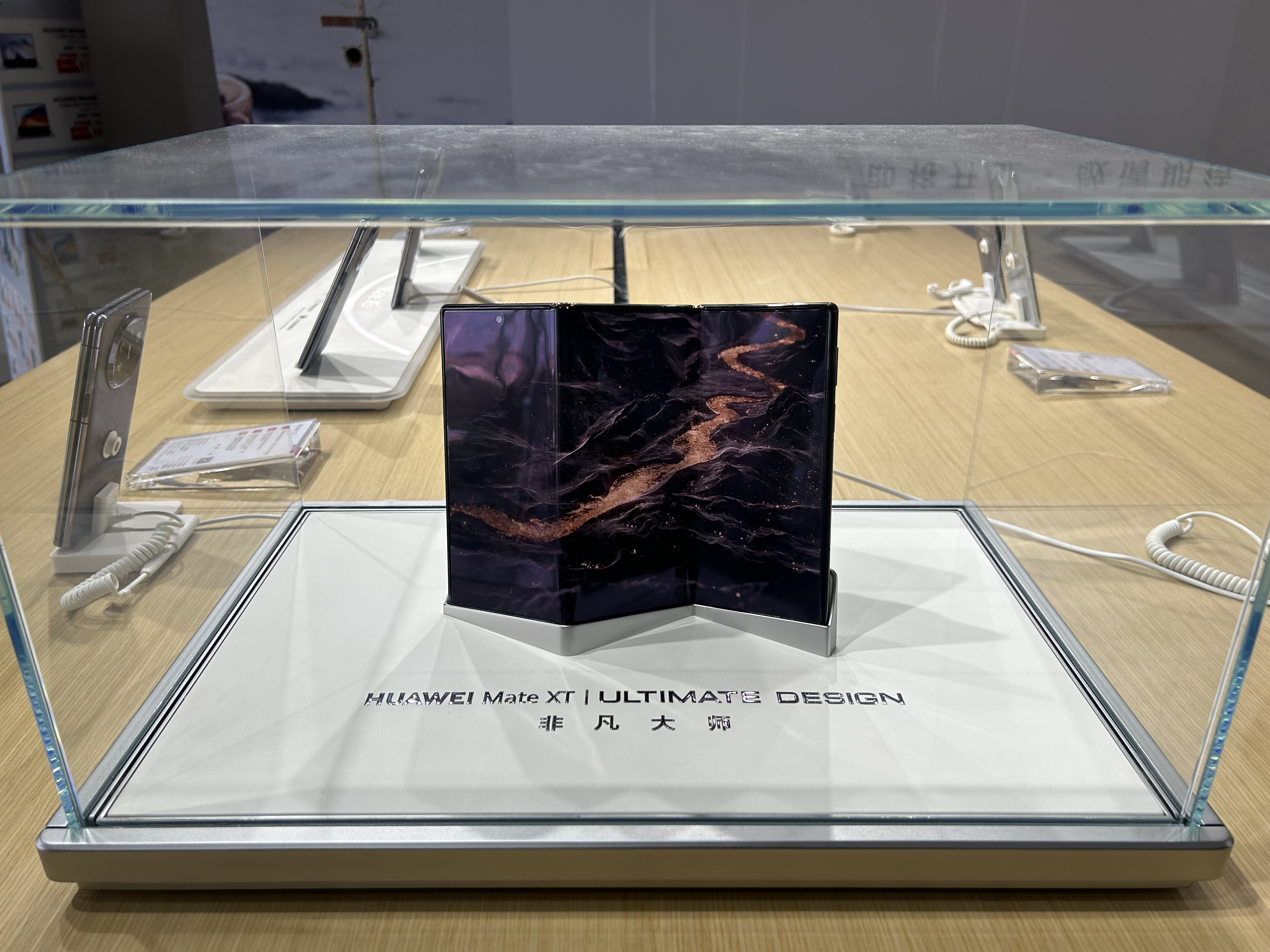
- A partially open Huawei Mate XT Ultimate Design
- Manufacturer: Huawei
- Type: Smartphone
- Series: Huawei Mate
- First released: September 20, 2024; 2 years ago
- Availability by region: September 20, 2024; 2 years ago (China); March 7, 2025; 19 months ago (Global)
- Related: Huawei Mate X6
- Compatible networks: GSM/ CDMA/ HSPA / CDMA2000/ LTE
- Form factor: Foldable smartphone
- Dimensions: Height: 156.7 mm Width: single screen: 73.5 mm; dual screen: 143.0 mm; triple screen: 219.0 mm Depth: single screen: 12.8 mm; dual screen: 7.45 mm / 4.75 mm; triple screen: 3.6 mm / 3.6 mm / 4.75 mm
- Weight: 298 g (10.5 oz)
- Operating system: HarmonyOS 4.2 (EMUI 14.2) Supports upgrade to HarmonyOS 5
- System-on-chip: HiSilicon Kirin 9010 (7 nm)
- CPU: Octa-core (1×2.3 GHz Taishan Big & 3×2.18 GHz Taishan Mid & 4×1.55 GHz Cortex-A510)
- GPU: Maleoon 910
- Memory: 16 GB RAM (LPDDR5 specification)
- Storage: 256GB / 512GB / 1TB ROM (UFS 4.0 specification)
- SIM: Dual SIM (Nano-SIM)
- Battery: 5600mAh (rated), not removable or replaceable
- Charging: Wired charging: 66W; Wireless charging: 50W; Wireless reverse charging: 7.5W
- Display: 1 panel: 6.4 in (160 mm); 2 panels: 7.9 in (200 mm); 3 panels:10.2 in (260 mm); Resolutions: 1 panel:2232 x 1008 px 2 panels:2232 x 2048 px 3 panels: 2232 x 3184 px
- Connectivity: Wi-Fi 802.11a/b/g/n/ac/ax, 2x2 MIMO, HE160, 4096 QAM, 8 spatial-stream sounding MU-MIMO; Bluetooth 5.2, Bluetooth Low Energy, SBC, AAC, LDAC and L2HC, HD audio NearLink; USB 3.1 Gen1 Type-C

The Huawei Mate XT Ultimate Design is the world's first double-folding, or tri-fold and largest foldable smartphone. (Note: Based on statistics of commercially available products, as of September 10, 2024, Huawei Mate XT Ultimate Design is the world's first commercially available triple-folding foldable smartphone.) It was announced on 10 September 2024 and made available for pre-order in China the same day. On 18 February 2025, it was announced globally and made available for pre-order in Kuala Lumpur, Malaysia. It primarily competes with Samsung's Galaxy Z TriFold.

== History ==
In August 2024, a prototype was spotted in public by Huawei consumer group CEO Richard Yu.

On September 3, 2024, 7 days before Huawei would unveil the name, and the company confirmed that the name would be as the "Mate XT" in a teaser video.

On September 10, 2024 Huawei announced the Mate XT in a keynote event announcing the specs with 16GB of ram, 256GB 512GB and 1TB storage options, a 10.2 inch screen with 1 flexible LTPO OLED 90Hz display, a 5,600 mAh battery, and a price of $2,800.

On February 18, 2025, Huawei announced that the Mate XT would be sold outside of China and be available internationally in all countries.

== Hardware ==
RAM: 16GB

Storage: 256 GB, 512 GB, or 1 TB

Diagonal display size: (depends on number of unfolded panels)

- 6.4 inch (1 panel)
- 7.9 inch (2 panels)
- 10.2 inch (3 panels), 3184 x 2232 pixels, 90 Hz, 16:11 ratio.

Cameras:

- 50MP main
- 12MP ultra-wide
- 12MP 5.5x telephoto
- 8MP selfie

Battery:

- 5600 mAh (total for three batteries)

== Features and specifications ==
Out of the box, the Huawei Mate XT Ultimate Design dual SIM (Nano + Nano) runs Harmony OS 4.2. Its 10.2-inch (3,184 x 2,232 pixel) flexible LTPO OLED screen folds into two different sizes when folded: 7.9 inches (2,048 x 2,232 pixels) when folded once, and 6.4 inches (1,008 x 2,232 pixels) when folded twice.

Details on the processor powering the Huawei Mate XT Ultimate Design, which features 16GB of RAM, have been released by the brand. It uses the Kirin 9010, which is a 7 nm processor. There are three storage configurations available: 256GB, 512GB, and 1TB. The Huawei Mate XT Ultimate Design base edition costs CNY 19,999 (about Rs. 2,37,000, or $2,800), and it has 16GB of RAM and 256GB of built-in storage. Furthermore, at CNY 21,999 (approximately Rs. 2,59,500 approximately $3090) and CNY 23,999 (approximately Rs. 2,84,000 approximately $3370), respectively, the phone will be available with storage capacities of 512GB and 1TB.

The 50-megapixel camera on the outside of the Huawei Mate XT Ultimate Design features optical image stabilization (OIS) and a variable aperture that goes from f/1.2 to f/4.0. It also has a 12-megapixel periscope telephoto camera with 5.5x optical zoom, OIS, and an f/3.4 aperture, as well as a 12-megapixel ultrawide camera with an f/2.2 aperture. The smartphone's display has an 8-megapixel camera for selfies and video chats, located in a hole-punch cutout in the center of the screen.

The Huawei Mate XT Ultimate Design has a USB 3.1 Type-C port, GPS, NFC, Bluetooth 5.2, Wi-Fi 6, 5G, and 4G LTE connectivity choices. In addition to having a side-mounted fingerprint scanner for biometric verification, the phone is equipped with a 5,600mAh battery that supports both fast wired charging at 66W and wireless charging at 50W. Additionally, it offers reverse charging capabilities, allowing users to charge other devices either with 5W wired reverse charging or 7.5W wireless reverse charging. It weighs 298g and has dimensions of 156.7x73x12.8mm for a single screen, 156.7x143x7.45mm for a dual screen, and 156.7x219x3.6mm for a triple screen.

The device can be used with a case that has a kickstand, and a foldable keyboard with a built-in trackpad to provide a desktop PC-like experience.

== Repair cost ==
The cost of replacing and maintaining the equipment will also be high. According to GSMArena, Huawei has released the official list of Mate XT repair charges. Replacing the screen will cost ¥7,999. If the user chooses to keep the old display, the repair will cost ¥9,799. In case the motherboard malfunctions, a replacement for the 1 TB model might cost as much as ¥10,699.
