= Gidge =

Swedish electronic duo

- Origin: Umeå, Sweden
- Genres: Ambient electronic
- Labels: Atomnation
- Members: Ludvig Stolterman; Jonathan Nilsson

Gidge is Swedish electronic duo consisting of Ludvig Stolterman and Jonathan Nilsson. The two met at age 16 in high school. Their mutual interest in electronic music led to the founding of Gidge. The group released their debut album Autumn Bells in 2014.

Ludvig Stolterman and Jonathan Nilsson are from Umeå, a town in northern Sweden. They claim their music is influenced by the Nordic environment, particularly the woods. The music is often recorded in the forest of Umeå and uses a mixture of electronic and organic elements, such as wooden and stone percussion. David Garber of Vice describes their music as "ethereal beats that will transport your mind, body and soul to a more peaceful place".

A reader poll at XLR8R's puts Gidge as Best New Artist and sold-out shows in Amsterdam, Berlin and London. After the release of their debut album, they garnered a million combined listens via SoundCloud and praise from Thump/Vice, Pigeons and Planes, Earmilk, XLR8R, and Gold Flake Paint.

On September 29, 2014, Nordic by Nature proclaimed Gidge "Artist of the Week". The band received praise for their songs Norrland, I Fell In Love and For Seoul.

On January 13, 2017, Gidge released their first studio EP, LNLNN.

In October 2018, Norrland was chosen as the signature tune for the advertisement of the HuaweiMate 20 line of smartphones.

In November 2020, New Light was released including singles such as Quasar and a track named over, that features a distorted vocal sample of member Ludvig's late pet Budgie saying “such a pretty boy” showing the dynamic duos ability to use obscure and subtle samples to create beautiful visuals

== Discography ==
- For Seoul (2013)
- Autumn Bells (2014)
- LNLNN (2017)
- New Light (2020)
