= Huawei Mate 70 =

Mobile phone

Huawei Mate 70 Huawei Mate 70 Pro Huawei Mate 70 Pro+ Huawei Mate 70 RS Ultimate Design
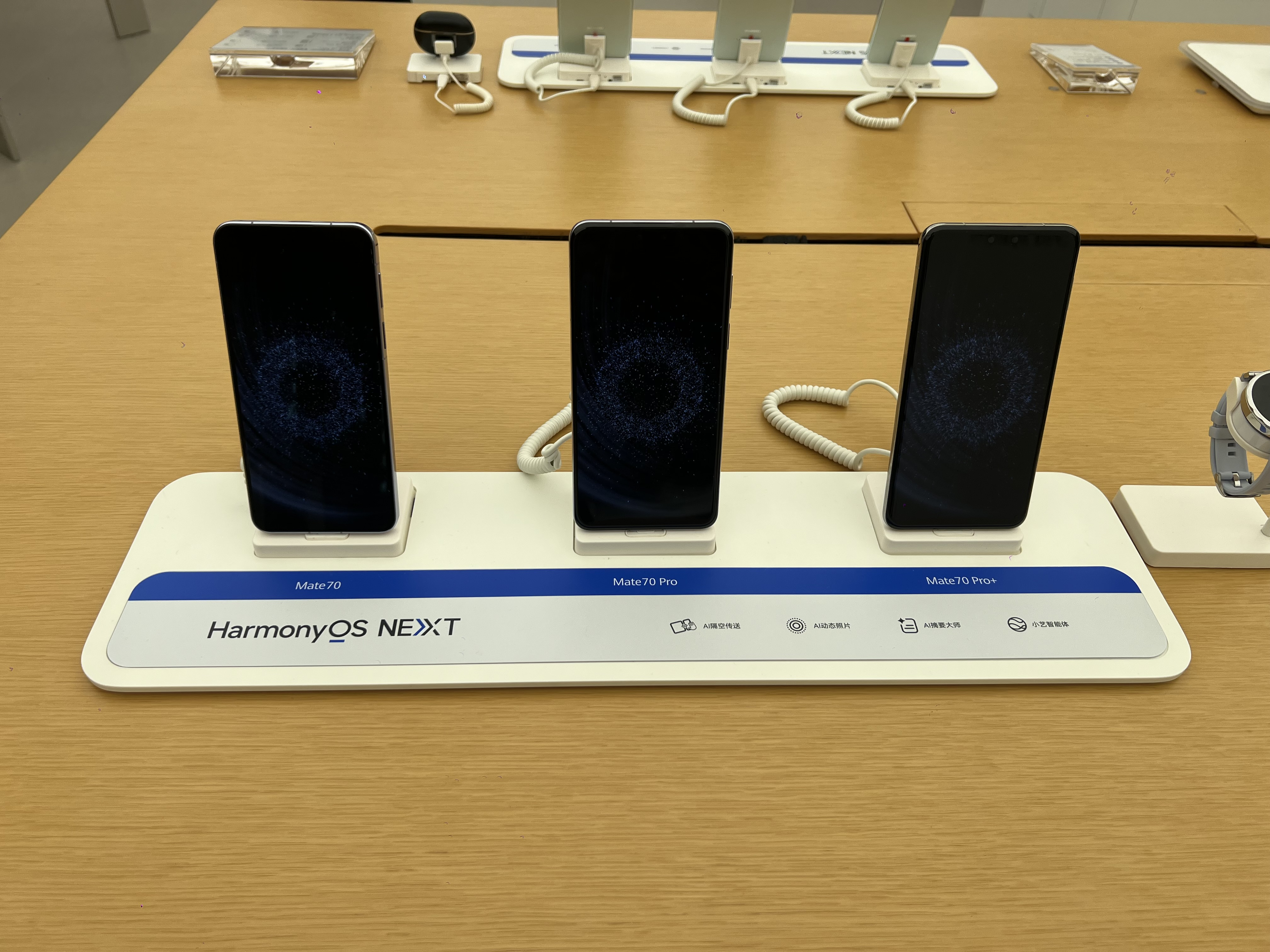
- Mate 70 (left), Mate 70 Pro (center), Mate 70 Pro+ (right)
- Manufacturer: Huawei
- Type: Smartphone
- Series: Huawei Mate
- First released: November 26, 2024
- Availability by region: China
- Predecessor: Huawei Mate 60
- Compatible networks: GSM/ CDMA/ HSPA / CDMA2000/ LTE
- Form factor: Slate
- Weight: Mate 70: 203 g (7.2 oz); Mate 70 Pro: 221 g (7.8 oz); Mate 70 Pro+: 226 g (8.0 oz); Mate 70 RS: 251 g (8.9 oz)
- Operating system: HarmonyOS 5 (Pioneer SKU); also supports HarmonyOS 4.3; standard SKU; Current: HarmonyOS 6
- System-on-chip: Mate 70: HiSilicon Kirin 9010 (7 nm); Mate 70 Pro, Pro+, and RS: HiSilicon Kirin 9020
- Memory: Mate 70, Pro: 12 GB RAM (LPDDR5 specification); Mate 70 Pro+, RS: 16GB (LPDDR5)
- Storage: Mate 70, 70 Pro: 256GB / 512GB / 1TB ROM; Mate 70 Pro+, RS: 512GB / 1TB ROM; (UFS 4.0 specification)
- SIM: Dual SIM (Nano-SIM)
- Battery: Mate 70: 5,300mAh (rated), not removable or replaceable; Mate 70 Pro: 5,500mAh (rated), not removable or replaceable; Mate 70 Pro+,RS: 5,700mAh (rated), not removable or replaceable
- Charging: Mate 70: Wired charging: 66W, Wireless charging: 50W, Wireless reverse charging: 20W, Wired reverse charging: 18W; Mate 70 Pro, Pro+, and RS: Wired charging: 100W, Wireless charging: 80W, Wireless reverse charging: 7.5W, Wired reverse charging: 5W
- Rear camera: 50 MP, f/1.4-f/4.0, 24mm (wide), PDAF, OIS 12 MP, f/2.1, 93mm (periscope telephoto), PDAF, OIS, 3.5x Optical zoom 40 MP, f/2.2, 13mm, 120˚ (ultrawide), PDAF
- Front camera: 13 MP, f/2.4, 18mm (ultrawide); TOF 3D, (depth/biometrics sensor)
- Display: 1 panel: 6.9 in (180 mm); Resolution: 1316 x 2832 px
- Sound: Yes, with stereo speakers, High-definition, no 3.5mm jack
- Connectivity: Wi-Fi 802.11a/b/g/n/ac/ax/be, 2x2 MIMO, HE160, 4096 QAM, 8 spatial-stream sounding MU-MIMO; Bluetooth 5.2, Bluetooth Low Energy, SBC, AAC, LDAC and L2HC, HD audio NearLink; USB 3.1 Gen1 Type-C

Huawei Mate 70 (stylized as HUAWEI Mate70) is a series of high-end smartphones manufactured by Huawei and released on the market in China in November 2024. The base model has a titanium casing. It features a 5,300 mAh battery, a 50 MP camera, up to 1 TB storage, 12 GB RAM and Beidou satellite connectivity. It runs the newly-launched operating system HarmonyOS 5 that is no longer based on Android.

The Mate 70 series comprises four models: Mate 70, Mate 70 Pro, Mate 70 Pro+, and Mate 70 RS.

== Design ==
The Mate 70 and Mate 70 Pro have an aluminium casing. Mate 70 PRO+ has a titanium casing. The Mate 70 Pro+ has a rear panel that is a mix of gold threads and brocade fiber; it is made of nylon material.

== Specifications ==
=== Hardware ===
==== Chipset ====
The Mate 70 series (except the Mate 70 Standard version) all uses the HiSilicon Kirin 9020 as SOC .

Another tech blogger has claimed that the Kirin 9020 is a 12-core processor with two 2.5 GHz high-performance cores, six 2.15 GHz mid-performance cores, and four 1.6 GHz efficiency cores. According to the blogger, the Kirin 9020 might have a greater performance than the Qualcomm Snapdragon 8+ Gen 1, which was manufactured with TSMC’s 4 nm process and was released in 2022.

==== Display ====
The smartphone has a 6.7-inch LTPO OLED display with a 120 Hz refresh rate and second generation Kunlun glass. The screen incorporates a 3D face recogmition sensor, while the fingerprint scanner is placed on the side of the phone.

==== Battery ====
The base model Mate 70 has a 5,300 mAh battery, while the Pro has a 5,500 mAh battery, and the Pro+ and RS models feature a 5,700 mAh battery.

==== Storage ====
The base Mate 70 and the Pro models have 256 GB, 512 GB and 1 TB models, all featuring 12 GB RAM. Both the Pro+ and RS models have a 512 GB and 1 TB model, both featuring 16 GB memory.

==== Camera ====
There are three cameras on the back of the Mate 70 Pro+: a main 50 MP RYYB sensor with a 24 mm variable f/1.4-f/4.0 aperture lens. Next to it is a 13 mm f/2.2 ultrawide with a 40 MP RYYB sensor, a 4x 92.5 mm f/2.1 telephoto with close-focusing abilities, and a 48MP RYYB sensor. All cameras have autofocusing. There is a 13 MP f/2.4 selfie camera on the front.

=== Software ===
==== Operating system ====
The Mate 70 was released with Huawei's HarmonyOS NEXT (or HarmonyOS 5) operating system, which dropped support for Android apps. However, users were still able to install the Android-based HarmonyOS 4.3 for app compatibility. American news network CNBC commented in November 2024: "For now, Huawei’s latest phones [the Mate 70 series] alongside HarmonyOS 5.0 are very much focused on the Chinese market, as the company still faces mounting challenges abroad."

==== Software ecosystem ====
According to Huawei, more than 15,000 native HarmonyOS NEXT applications and services were available in November 2024.

==== Artificial intelligence features ====
With regard to the camera, AI movement trajectory and the AI heroic moment ensure that the subject remains in focus irrespective of its surroundings or speed. Other features include AI summaries that summarize an entire article in notable points with just one click. AI noise reduction telephone calls ensure that the caller can remain in contact regardless of the environment.

== Benchmarking ==
AnTuTu scores for the Kirin 9020 chip used in the Mate 70 Pro+ revealed roughly 1.3 million points. That was nowhere near the score the flagship chips from Qualcomm and MediaTek achieved at the time (e.g. at most roughly 2 to 2.1 million points for the 2024 Qualcomm Snapdragon 8 Gen 3; roughly 1.9 million points for the successful OnePlus 12 smartphone using that chip), but this score constituted a nearly 30% improvement over the Kirin 9010 chip found in the Pura 70 series, which scored nearly 1 million points on AnTuTu.

== See also ==
- Huawei Mate 50
- Huawei Mate 60
- List of Huawei phones
