= Huawei Mate S =

Android smartphone developed by Huawei

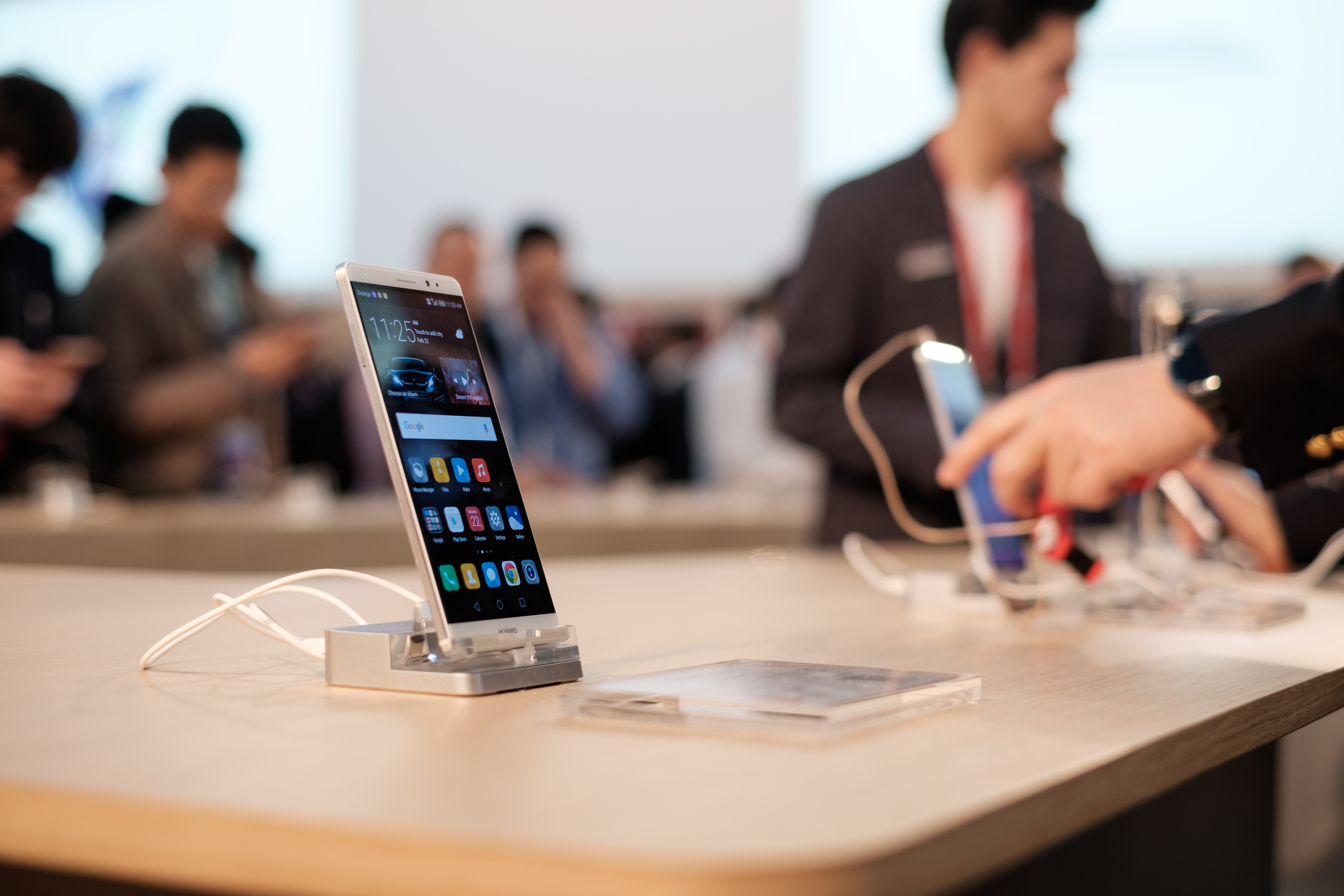
- Huawei Mate S on MWC 2016
- Manufacturer: Huawei
- Series: Huawei Mate
- First released: 2015; 11 years ago
- Related: Huawei Mate 8
- Operating system: Original: Android 5 1.1 "Lollipop"; Current: Android 6.0.1 "Marshmallow"
- Memory: 3 GB RAM
- Storage: 32/64/128 GB
- Removable storage: microSD up to 256 GB
- Website: Official website

Huawei Mate S is an Android smartphone developed by Huawei as part of the Huawei Mate series.

== Specifications ==
The phone has 3 GB RAM, it has 32 GB, 64 GB and 128 GB of internal storage and is connectable using Bluetooth and Wi-Fi. It does have GPS.

== Functions ==
Shortcut to functions can be triggered by "Knuckle" on the screen - such as "Knuckle S" for long screen capture, "Knuckle C" for camera etc.
