= Huawei Mate 60 =

Smartphone

Huawei Mate 60 Huawei Mate 60 Pro Huawei Mate 60 Pro+ Huawei Mate 60 RS
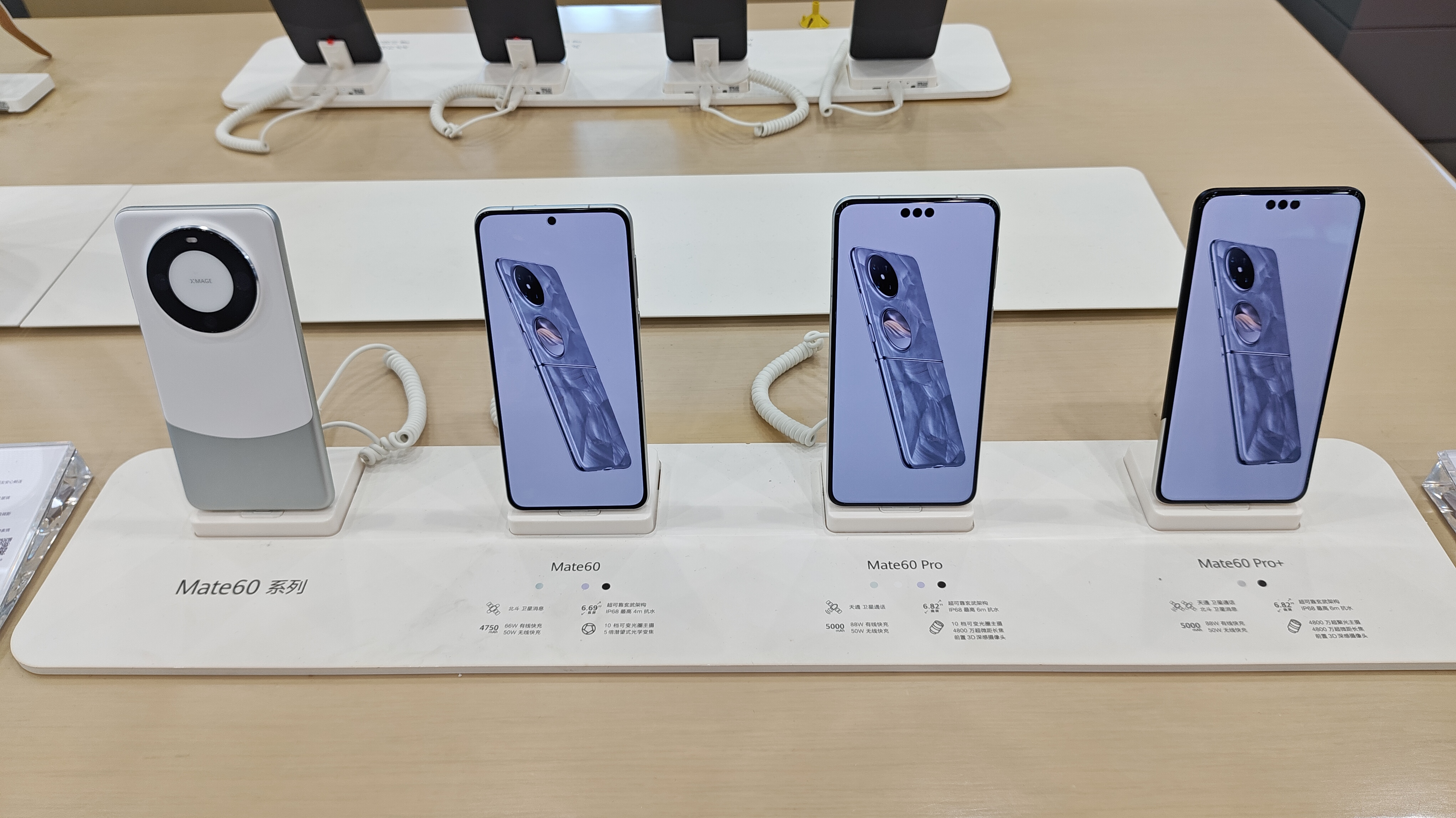
- From left to right: the back of the Mate 60 Pro, the front of the Mate 60, Mate 60 Pro and Mate 60 Pro+
- Manufacturer: Huawei
- Type: Phablet, satellite phone
- Series: Huawei Mate
- First released: Unreleased direct listing
- Availability by region: Mate 60 Pro: August 29, 2023; 2 years ago Mate 60: August 30, 2023; 2 years ago Mate 60 Pro+: September 8, 2023; 2 years ago Mate 60 RS: September 25, 2023; 2 years ago
- Predecessor: Huawei Mate 50
- Successor: Huawei Mate 70
- Related: Huawei P60
- Compatible networks: GSM/ CDMA/ HSPA / CDMA2000/ LTE
- Form factor: Slate
- Dimensions: Mate 60: 161.4 mm (6.35 in) height 76 mm (3.0 in) Width; 7.95 mm (0.313 in) Thickness; Mate 60 Pro: 163 mm (6.4 in) Height; 79 mm (3.1 in) Width; 8.1 mm (0.32 in) Thickness
- Weight: Mate 60: 209 g (7.4 oz); Mate 60 Pro/60 Pro+: 225 g (7.9 oz)
- Operating system: HarmonyOS 4 Current: HarmonyOS 6
- System-on-chip: HiSilicon Kirin 9000S (7nm)
- CPU: HiSilicon Kirin 9000S
- GPU: Maleoon 910 MP4, up to 2.056 TFLOPS (FP32) clocked at 750MHz
- Modem: 5G
- Memory: Mate 60/Pro: 12GB RAM; Mate 60 Pro+: 16GB RAM (LPDDR5 specification)
- Storage: 256GB (Pro+ and RS do not have this specification)/512GB/1TB ROM (UFS 3.1 specification)
- Removable storage: NM card up to 256GB
- SIM: Card slot 1: Nano-SIM; Card slot 2: Choose one of the two Nano-SIM or NM memory card
- Battery: Mate 60: Li-Po 4750mAh (typical), 4750mAh (rated), not removable or replaceable Mate 60 Pro: Li-Po 5000mAh (typ), 4900mAh (rated), not removable or replaceable
- Charging: Mate 60: Wired fast charging: 66W; Wireless fast charging: 50W; Reverse wireless charging: 7.5W; Mate 60 Pro: Wired fast charging: 88W; Wireless fast charging: 50W; Reverse wireless charging: 20W
- Rear camera: Mate 60: Main lens: 50 million pixels (F1.4-F4.0 aperture, OIS optical image stabilization) supports super optical zoom Ultra wide angle: 12 million pixels (F2.2 aperture); Telephoto: 12 million pixel periscope (F3.4 aperture, OIS optical image stabilization); Mate 60 Pro: Main lens: 50 million pixels (F1.4-F4.0 aperture, OIS optical image stabilization) supports super optical zoom Ultra wide angle: 12 million pixels (F2. 2 aperture); Telephoto: 48 million pixels (F3.0 aperture, OIS optical image stabilization)
- Front camera: 13 million pixel ultra-wide angle (F2.4 aperture), ToF camera
- Display: Mate 60: 6.69 in (170 mm); 2688 x 1216 px resolution Mate 60 Pro: 6.82 in (173 mm); 2720 x 1260 px resolution, 19.5:9 ratio (~428 ppi density); All: OLED, 1-120Hz LTPO adaptive refresh rate, 300Hz touch sampling rate
- Sound: stereo
- Connectivity: Wi-Fi 802.11 a/b/g/n/ac/ax, 2 × 2 MIMO, HE160, 1024 QAM, 8 Spatial-stream Sounding MU-MIMO; Bluetooth 5.2, NearLink1.0 (Star Flash), supports SBC, AAC, supports LDAC and L2HC high-definition audio USB 3.1 Gen 1 Type-C
- Model: Mate 60: BRA-AL00; Mate 60 Pro: ALN-AL00/ALN-AL80; Mate 60 Pro+ : ALN-AL10
- Other: IP68 dustproof and waterproof, second generation Kunlun glass

The Huawei Mate 60 (stylized as HUAWEI Mate60) is a 2023 series of high-end smartphones by the Chinese Huawei corporation from its Huawei Mate series. It has a Kirin 9000s SoC chipset designed by HiSilicon and produced by the SMIC foundry. The Mate 60 supports satellite communications and 5G.

== Technology ==
=== Hardware ===
==== Processors ====
The Mate 60 is the first Huawei smartphone to feature a 7 nm SoC designed and manufactured in mainland China, despite the imposition of US sanctions on the company.

The HiSilicon Kirin 9000S CPU is a SoC supposed to consist of four high-performance cores (one at up to 2.62 GHz and three at up to 2,150 MHz) that is based on HiSilicon's custom TaiShan microarchitecture and four energy-efficient cores (up to 1,530 MHz) based on ARM's Cortex 510. The Mate 60 also uses the Maleoon 910 graphics processing unit operating at up to 750 MHz.

==== Network communications ====
According to third-party testing, after inserting the SIM card, the Mate 60 does not show a 5G connection and Huawei does not mention supporting 5G in the parameter details; the actual network speed test shows that its performance is 5G. Reports also believe that it has the ability to support 5G.

Huawei focuses more on promoting its satellite capabilities. The Mate 60 supports satellite call functions through the Tiantong system and short message sending and receiving functions through the Beidou system.

The Mate 60 also supports NearLink, a short-range wireless communication technology that combines the features of Bluetooth and Wi-Fi with enhanced prerequisites and can be used in the future with Internet of Things and Internet of Vehicles.

==== Camera ====
At the end of 2023, the Mate 60 Pro+ had the best smartphone camera in the world, according to DxOMark.Mate 60 camera supports maximum of 60 frames per second video recording at 4k.

=== Software ===
==== Operating system ====
The Mate 60 was launched with the operating system HarmonyOS 4. In the second quarter of 2025, an update from HarmonyOS 4 to the operating system HarmonyOS NEXT 5.0.1, which does not support Android apps, was to become available.

== Reception ==
The launch of the Mate 60 garnered significant attention and was widely touted as a victory against US government sanctions intended to stop Chinese companies from producing or obtaining advanced chips. The Mate 60 became a major market success, with a consumer buying spree and discourse celebrating the phone's release as a victory in the United States' trade war against China.

Originally set to be released on 12 September 2023, the launch date was moved earlier to 29 August 2023, coinciding the visit of United States Commerce Secretary Gina Raimondo to China. The change in timing was widely interpreted by the Chinese public to be "slapping the U.S. in the face" and memes proliferated on the internet mocking Raimondo by depicting her as a Huawei brand ambassador or depicting her holding a Mate 60 Pro.

Huawei's breakthrough raised concerns within the US government that technological restrictions alone were unable to prevent Huawei from obtaining advanced chips: the U.S. Department of Commerce launched an investigation into the situation at the end of 2023.

On March 5, 2024, a report by Counterpoint Research claimed that although overall Chinese smartphone sales were 7% lower in the first six weeks of 2024, compared with the same period in 2023, Apple’s recently launched flagship iPhone 15 was selling exceptionally badly, with Apple’s overall smartphone unit sales falling 24% in the relevant period, because buyers were turning towards devices made by Huawei. According to Counterpoint Research, Huawei saw unit sales rise by 64% in the period.

== Impact in China ==
Huawei had told their customers that stores in Shenzhen would only have a certain amount of phones to sell, which resulted in long lines outside every store. On August 30, 2023, Huawei Mall launched the Mate 60 pre-order page. On September 3 of that same year, the Mate 60 Pro was fully on-sale. At 18:08, online platforms such as Huawei Mall, Taobao, Tmall, and JD.com sold out all available colors in just one minute after opening sales to the public. There were also lines of people waiting to buy at Huawei stores across China. On September 8, Huawei Mall launched the Mate 60 Pro+ pre-order page.
