= Huawei Mate 30 =

High-end smartphone line by Huawei

Huawei Mate 30/5G Huawei Mate 30 Pro/5G Huawei Mate 30 RS Porsche Design
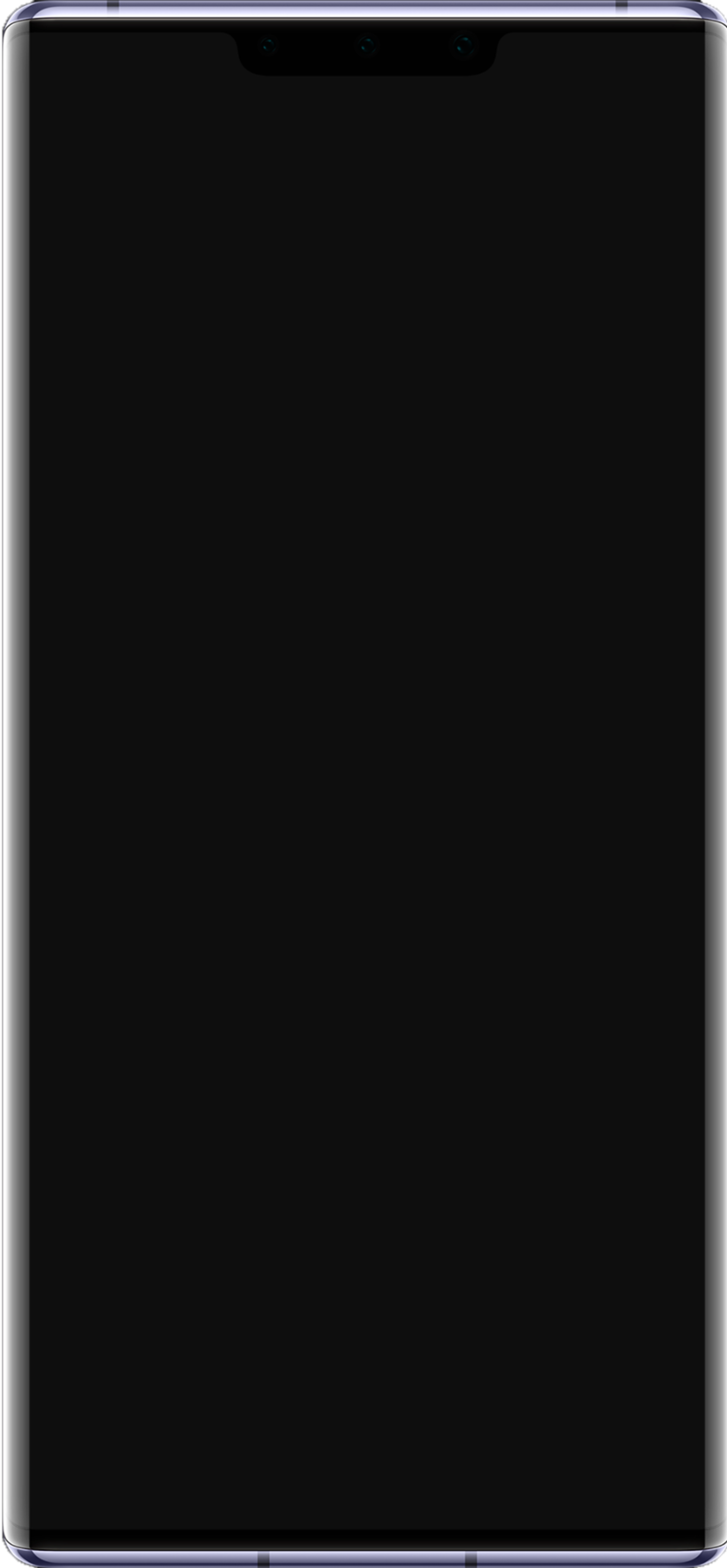
- Huawei Mate 30 Pro
- Developer: Huawei
- Type: Phablet
- Series: Huawei Mate
- First released: 19 September 2019; 6 years ago (Munich, Germany)
- Availability by region: 26 September 2019; 6 years ago (China); RS Porsche Design: November 10, 2019; 6 years ago (China)
- Predecessor: Huawei Mate 20
- Successor: Huawei Mate 40
- Related: Huawei P30, Huawei Mate X
- Form factor: Slate
- Dimensions: Huawei Mate 30 160.8 x 76.1 x 8.4 mm (6.33 x 3.00 x 0.33 in) Huawei Mate 30 Pro 158.1 x 73.1 x 8.8 mm (6.22 x 2.88 x 0.35 in)
- Weight: Huawei Mate 30 196 g (6.91 oz) Huawei Mate 30 Pro 198 g (6.98 oz)
- Operating system: EMUI 10.1 based on Android 10 (SDK Rom); Current: China: HarmonyOS 4.2
- System-on-chip: HiSilicon Kirin 990
- CPU: Huawei Mate 30/Pro Octa-core (2x2.86 GHz Cortex-A76 & 2x2.09 GHz Cortex-A76 & 4x1.86 GHz Cortex-A55) Huawei Mate 30 5G/Pro 5G Octa-core (2x2.86 GHz Cortex-A76 & 2x2.36 GHz Cortex-A76 & 4x1.95 GHz Cortex-A55)
- GPU: Mali-G76 MP16
- Memory: 6GB or 8GB RAM; 12GB RAM (RS Porsche Design)
- Storage: 128GB or 256GB (expandable via the Huawei Nano Memory Card); 512GB (RS Porsche Design)
- Removable storage: Huawei Nano Memory Card 256GB
- SIM: nanoSIM
- Battery: Huawei Mate 30 Non-removable Li-Po 4200 mAh battery Huawei Mate 30 Pro Non-removable Li-Po 4500 mAh battery
- Charging: Supercharge
- Rear camera: Huawei Mate 30; Triple; 40 MP, f/1.8, 27mm (wide), 1/1.7", PDAF, Laser AF; 8 MP, f/2.4, 80mm (telephoto), 1/4", PDAF, Laser AF, OIS, 3x optical zoom, 16 MP, f/2.2, 17mm (ultrawide) Leica optics, dual-LED dual-tone flash, panorama, HDR; 2160p@30/60fps, 1080p@30/60/120fps, 720p@960fps, gyro-EIS Huawei Mate 30 Pro Quad 40 MP, f/1.6, 27mm (wide), 1/1.7", PDAF, OIS 8 MP, f/2.4, 80mm (telephoto), 1/4", PDAF, OIS, 3x optical zoom 40 MP, f/1.8, 18mm (ultrawide), 1/1.54", PDAF 3D ToF camera Leica optics, dual-LED dual-tone flash, panorama, HDR 2160p@30/60fps, 1080p@30/60/120fps, 1080p@960fps, 720p@7680fps, gyro-EIS
- Front camera: Huawei Mate 30; 24 MP, f/2.0 3D ToF cam HDR; 1080p@30fps Huawei Mate 30 Pro; 32 MP, f/2.0, (wide); 2.4 MP, (motion gesture camera); 3D ToF camera HDR, panorama 1080p@30fps
- Display: Huawei Mate 30 OLED capacitive touchscreen, 16M colors 6.62 inches, 107.6 cm2 (~87.9% screen-to-body ratio) 1080 x 2340 pixels, 19.5:9 ratio (~389 ppi density) DCI-P3, HDR10 Huawei Mate 30 Pro OLED capacitive touchscreen, 16M colors 6.53 inches, 108.7 cm2 (~94.1% screen-to-body ratio) 1176 x 2400 pixels, 18.5:9 ratio (~409 ppi density) Corning Gorilla Glass 6 DCI-P3, HDR10
- Sound: Loudspeaker with stereo speakers (Mate 30) or acoustic speaker (Mate 30 Pro); 3.5mm jack (Mate 30); 32-bit/384kHz audio Active noise cancellation with dedicated microphone
- Water resistance: Mate 30: IP53; Mate 30 Pro: IP68, up to 1.5 m (4.9 ft) for 30 minutes
- Website: Mate 30; Mate 30 5G; Mate 30 Pro; Mate 30 Pro 5G

Huawei Mate 30 is a line of Android-based phablets manufactured by Huawei as part of its Huawei Mate series, and the successor to the Mate 20. The Mate 30 comprises the Mate 30/5G, Mate 30 Pro/5G, and Mate 30 RS Porsche Design, which were unveiled on 19 September 2019 in Munich, Germany.

Due to ongoing U.S. sanctions against Huawei that prevented it from licensing the Google-certified Android with Google Mobile Services for new devices, international models of the Mate 30 run an Android 10-derived operating system utilizing a Huawei-provided software stack and application store (similarly to other Chinese smartphones sold domestically, as Google does not do business in mainland China).

== Specifications ==
=== Design ===
The Mate 30 and Mate 30 Pro have a similar design, with an aluminum frame and glass backing, and are available in Black, Space Silver, Cosmic Purple and Emerald Green colours, with artificial leather options also available. Both displays contain notches, with the Mate 30 Pro using a larger tab concealing additional infrared sensors used for a facial recognition system. The Mate 30's cutout for the front camera resembles the P20 and P20 Pro, and is larger than the Mate 20's, in order to accommodate a time-of-flight sensor. The camera arrays on the Mate 30 and the Mate 30 Pro are circular, as opposed to the squarish design of the Mate 20 and Mate 20 Pro, and the flash is now offset to the left, separate from the camera housing. The Mate 30 Pro's display has curved edges at 88-degrees with no physical volume buttons; virtual controls are used instead. Edge detection and palm rejection are implemented to prevent accidental touches. The Mate 30 Pro also lacks an earpiece, opting to use the same "electromagnetic levitation" speaker as on the P30 Pro.

=== Hardware ===
Both models utilize the Kirin 990 system-on-chip, an octa-core SoC featuring Cortex-A76 and Cortex-A55 CPU cores, Mali-G76 MP16 GPU, and a pair of AI accelerators. Six of the Kirin 990's cores are overclocked on the 5G and Porsche Design models. The Mate 30 is available with 128 GB of storage and 6 or 8 GB of RAM, while the Mate 30 Pro is available with 128 or 256 GB of storage and 8 GB of RAM. Both have up to 256 GB of expandable storage via Huawei's proprietary Nano Memory format, which also serves as a hybrid SIM tray. The Mate 30 Pro is rated IP68 for dust and water resistance (up to 2m for 30 mins) while the Mate 30 has IP53 for dust and splash protection. An OLED panel is used for both displays. The Mate 30 uses a 6.62 in (168 mm) 19.5:9 1080p display, while the Mate 30 Pro has a 6.53 in (166 mm) 18.5:9 1080p+ display with curved edges. The Mate 30 Pro's display also supports hovering gestures and Huawei's M-Pen. The Mate 30 is powered by a 4200 mAh battery while the Mate 30 Pro has a 4500 mAh battery, and both are capable of fast charging at 40 W wired and 27 W wireless. Both models support Qi inductive charging and can charge other Qi-compatible devices from its own battery power. USB-C connectors are present on both, but only the Mate 30 includes a headphone jack. Both have an optical in-screen fingerprint reader as well.

==== Camera ====
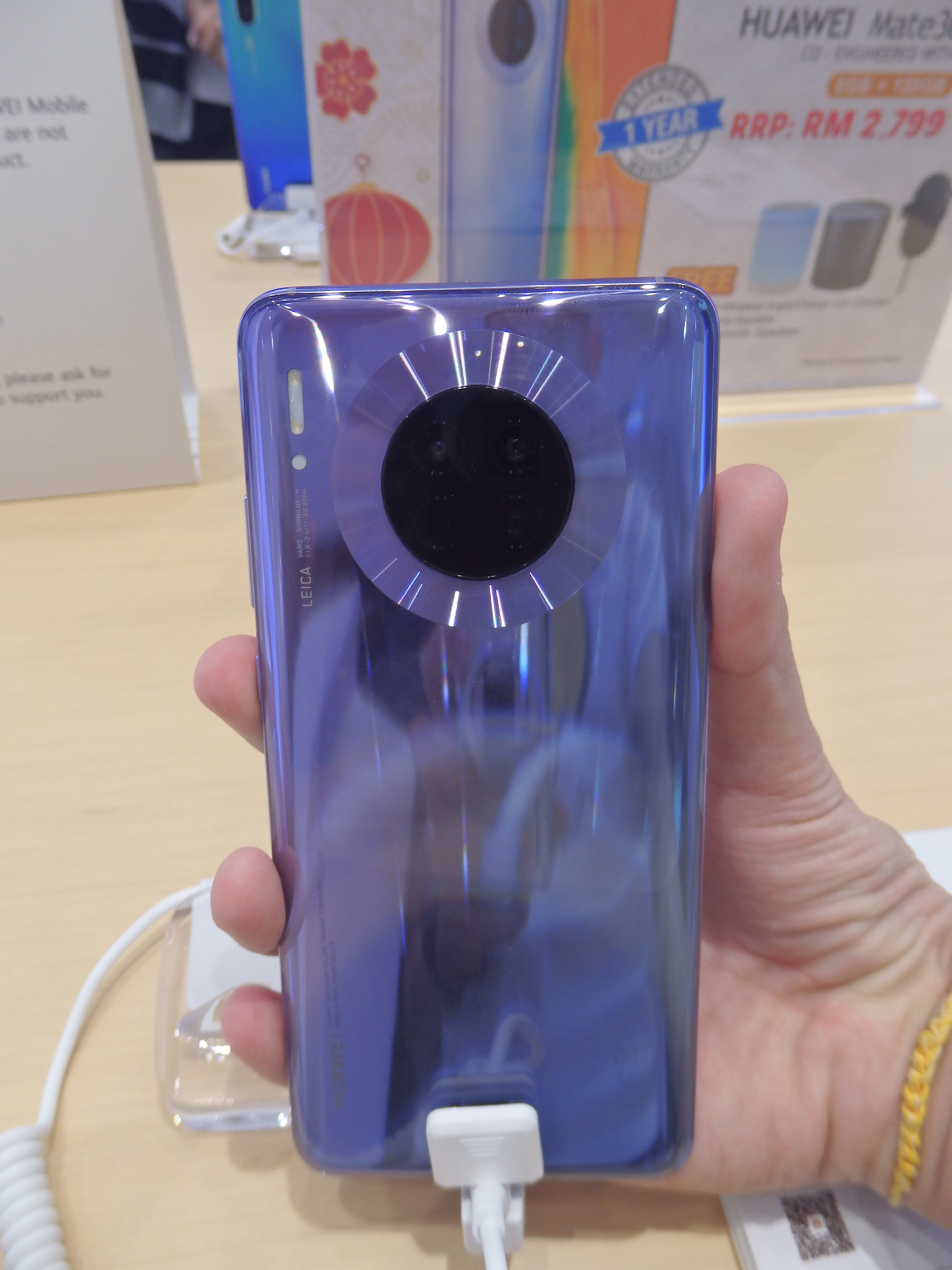
Rear of a Huawei Mate 30 showing its centralised circular quad camera set-up

The Mate 30 has three rear cameras: a 40 MP main camera, an 8 MP telephoto lens with 3x optical zoom and a 16 MP ultrawide lens, along with a 24 MP front camera; the Mate 30 Pro has four rear cameras: a 40 MP main camera, an 8 MP telephoto lens, a 40 MP ultrawide lens and a 3D ToF camera. The Mate 30's camera design is the same as the Mate 30's, and has the laser-autofocus in place of the time-of-flight sensor. The front cameras on both are assisted by a 3D ToF camera, but the Mate 30 Pro has a higher resolution 32 MP sensor compared to the Mate 30's 24 MP sensor. OIS is present on the telephoto lens for both, but the Mate 30 Pro also has OIS on its main lens unlike the Mate 30. While the resolution of the ultrawide-angle lens has been increased, the Mate 30 Pro has a regular telephoto camera and can only achieve 3x optical zoom, 5x hybrid and 30x digital zoom, compared to the P30 Pro's 5x optical, 10x hybrid and 50x digital zoom. The P30 Pro's camera modes have been carried over to the Mate 30 Pro. Night Mode has been improved, and the Mate 30 Pro can take 4K HDR Plus time-lapse and ultraslow-motion video, shooting 720p at 7680 frames per second. Like its predecessor, the Mate 30 series uses Leica optics.

=== Software ===
The Mate 30 and Mate 30 Pro runs operating system software branded as EMUI 10, which is based on Android Open Source Project (AOSP) source code. Due to ongoing United States sanctions against Huawei, international models of the Mate 30 do not ship with or support Google Mobile Services — the proprietary software suite (including Google Play-branded software) shipped on certified Android devices, and Huawei is not allowed to market the device using the Android trademark.

Huawei is promoting the use of its own in-house platforms as a substitute, including the Huawei AppGallery store (which is already used on Chinese models of Huawei's devices due to Google not doing business there). Huawei stated that it would make a US$1 billion investment in promoting software development and growth of AppGallery. As with other Android devices, third-party apps can still be sideloaded via APK files, though full compatibility is not guaranteed if the app depends on Google services.

A Huawei executive stated that the company had planned to allow bootloader unlocks for the Mate 30, which could have promoted the development of custom operating system ROMs that do support Google's apps. However, the company later stated that it had "no plans" to do so.

In late-September 2019, a tool named "LZPlay" surfaced, which allowed the Google Mobile Services apps to be installed on the Mate 30. The app was found to use undocumented permissions within Huawei's mobile device management APIs. On October 1, 2019, after the publication of an article that revealed these mechanics, the app's website abruptly went offline, and devices that had used LZPlay began to fail Google's SafetyNet verification checks.

In June 2020, Huawei announced the EMUI 10.1 update (originating from the P40), which includes new first-party apps such as virtual assistant Celia and the video calling service MeeTime, multi-window mode, and various user interface tweaks.

== Model variations ==
=== Mate 30 RS Porsche Design ===
The Huawei Mate 30 RS Porsche Design is a special edition of the Mate 30 Pro; its rear cover has a black or two-tone black and red racing stripe inspired glass/leather design, while it features 512 GB of storage and 12 GB of RAM.

=== Mate 30E Pro ===
The Huawei Mate 30E Pro is a version of the Mate 30 Pro exclusive to China. The device runs on EMUI 11, is powered by the Kirin 990E 5G which has less GPU cores compared to the Kirin 990 5G, and has no 512 GB model.

== Reception ==
Engadget called the Mate 30 Pro "a device with staggering imaging and video capabilities that is hamstrung by its poor, or nonexistent, app selection", while Digital Trends concluded that the Mate 30 Pro is "the best smartphone you can't buy". Andrew Williams of Wired UK was more critical of the device, giving it a 5/10. He praised the cameras, battery life, design and hardware, while panning the lack of Google apps, the gesture volume control and screen vignetting.

Huawei Mate 30 Pro received an overall score of 121 from DXOMARK, overtaking the Samsung Galaxy Note 10+ 5G. The device had a photo score of 131, a video score of 100, and a selfie score of 93.

== See also ==
- List of Huawei phones
