= Huawei Mate =

High-end HarmonyOS phablet smartphone line by Huawei

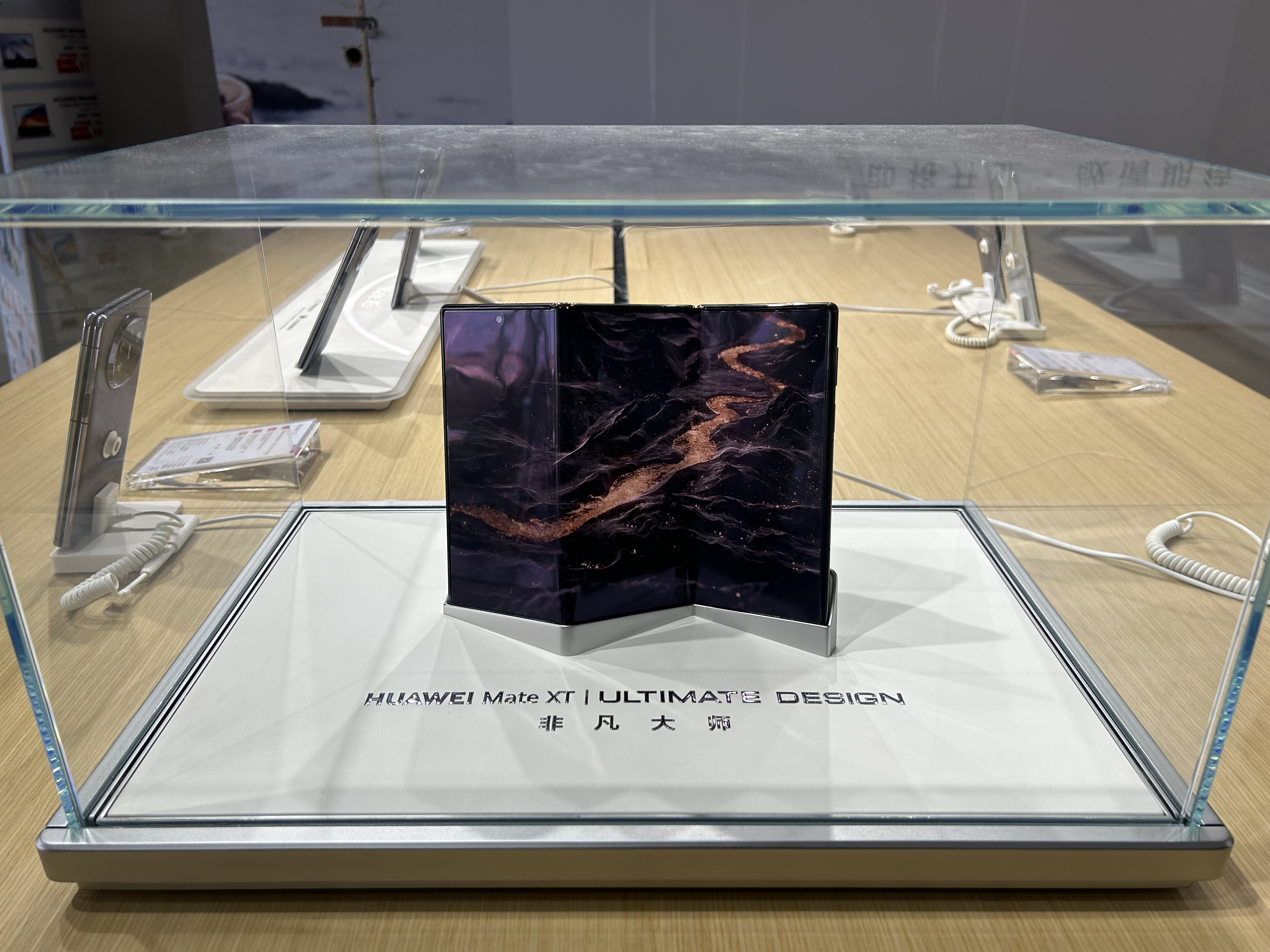
- Front face of the latest flagship model, Huawei Mate XT Ultimate Design
- Developer: Huawei
- Type: Smartphone, foldable smartphone, tablet
- Released: 2013; 13 years ago
- Operating system: HarmonyOS 2021; 5 years ago Android (2013-2021)

Huawei Mate, formally Huawei Ascend Mate, is a series of high-end smartphones and tablet computers produced by Huawei, based on their proprietary HarmonyOS mobile operating system (previously based on Android prior to technology sanctions of the China-United States trade war). It is one of Huawei's two flagship product lines for mobile devices, along with the phone-only Pura series.

Under the company's current hardware release cadence, the Pura series phones are typically directed towards mainstream camera phone enthusiasts, while the Mate series focus on refining and expanding more radically innovative technologies that lean towards early adopters. From 2016 until 2021, Huawei was in a co-engineering partnership with the German optics manufacturer Leica, whose camera lenses were used on the Mate series cameras but have since been replaced by Huawei's in-house XMAGE (Chinese: 睿影; pinyin: ruì ying; lit. 'wise image') imaging brand.

On 26 November 2024, Huawei unveiled the Mate 70 series, comprising Mate 70, Mate 70 Pro, Mate 70 Pro+, and Mate 70 RS Ultimate Design, all running HarmonyOS NEXT (5.0) built entirely in-house and no longer compatible with Android apps. The Mate 70 Pro and higher models are powered by the Kirin 9020 chip developed by Huawei's subsidiary HiSilicon, while the base model Mate 70 uses the Kirin 9010. These models feature advanced camera hardware, robust build quality (e.g. Kunlun Glass, IP69), and high‑capacity batteries with fast USB-C and wireless charging.

In early 2025, Huawei launched the Pura 80 series, integrating upgraded imaging sensors (including a 1‑inch main sensor on the Ultra model), improved periscope zoom, and HDR technology, further refining design and camera innovations initially introduced by the Mate series. The Huawei Mate 80 series with Mate 80, Pro, Pro Max and RS Ultimate Design, alongside Mate X7 foldable phone was later announced on November 25, 2025, and went on sale November 28, 2025 in China officially with post-Android HarmonyOS 6 software preinstalled with latest rumoured 5 nm Kirin 9030 and Kirin 9030 Pro chips with NearLink E2.0 on board with new infinity design on Mate 80 series except RS Ultimate Design and Mate X7 features new foldable Xuanwu Architecture. The Mate 80 series features the world's brightest display with 8,000 nits peak brightness.

== Phones ==
Huawei Mate
2013	Huawei Ascend Mate
2014	Huawei Ascend Mate 2
2014	Huawei Ascend Mate 7
2015	Huawei Ascend Mate 7 Monarch
2015	Huawei Mate S
2015	Huawei Mate 8
2016	Huawei Mate 9
2017	Huawei Mate 9 Porsche Design
2017	Huawei Mate 9 Pro
2017	Huawei Mate 10
2017	Huawei Mate 10 Lite
2017	Huawei Mate 10 Pro
2017	Huawei Mate 10 Porsche Design
2018	Huawei Mate SE
2018	Huawei Mate RS Porsche Design
2018	Huawei Mate 20 Lite
2018	Huawei Mate 20
2018	Huawei Mate 20 Pro
2018	Huawei Mate 20 X
2018	Huawei Mate 20 RS Porsche Design
2019	Huawei Mate 20 X 5G
2019	Huawei Mate 30
2019	Huawei Mate 30 5G
2019	Huawei Mate 30 Pro
2019	Huawei Mate 30 Pro 5G
2019	Huawei Mate 30 RS Porsche Design
2019	Huawei Mate X
2020	Huawei Mate Xs
2020	Huawei Mate 30E Pro 5G
2020	Huawei Mate 40
2020	Huawei Mate 40 Pro
2020	Huawei Mate 40 Pro+
2020	Huawei Mate 40 RS Porsche Design
2021	Huawei Mate X2
2021	Huawei Mate 40E
2021	Huawei Mate 40E 4G
2021	Huawei Mate X2 4G
2022	Huawei Mate Xs 2
2022	Huawei Mate 50
2022	Huawei Mate 50E
2022	Huawei Mate 50 Pro
2022	Huawei Mate 50 RS Porsche Design
2023	Huawei Mate X3
2023	Huawei Mate X5
2023	Huawei Mate 60
2023	Huawei Mate 60 Pro
2023	Huawei Mate 60 Pro+
2023	Huawei Mate 60 RS Ultimate Design
2024	Huawei Mate XT Ultimate Design
2024	Huawei Mate 70
2024	Huawei Mate 70 Pro
2024	Huawei Mate 70 Pro+
2024	Huawei Mate 70 RS Ultimate Design
2024	Huawei Mate X6
2025	Huawei Mate XTs
2025	Huawei Mate 70 Air
2025	Huawei Mate 80
2025	Huawei Mate 80 Pro
2025	Huawei Mate 80 Pro Max
2025	Huawei Mate 80 RS Ultimate Design
2025	Huawei Mate X7
2026	Huawei Mate XT 2 Ultimate Design
2026	Huawei Mate 90
2026	Huawei Mate 90 Pro
2026	Huawei Mate 90 RS Ultimate Design
2026	Huawei Mate 90 Pro Max

=== Huawei Ascend Mate ===
The Huawei Ascend Mate smartphone was announced in 2013 at CES. It was released in China in February 2013; its international release was in March 2013.

- Display: 6.1-inch IPS display with 720×1280 pixel resolution
- RAM: 1 or 2 GB
- Battery: 4050 mAh

=== Huawei Ascend Mate 2 4G ===
Huawei announced the Huawei Ascend Mate 2 4G smartphone at CES in 2014.

- Display: 6.1-inch display with 720×1280 pixel resolution
- Processor: Qualcomm Snapdragon 400

=== Huawei Ascend Mate 7 ===
Released September 2014

- Display: 6.0 inches, 1080 × 1920 pixels
- Processor: HiSilicon Kirin 925

=== Huawei Mate S ===
Huawei announced the Huawei Mate S smartphone on September 2, 2015, at IFA in Berlin.

- Display: 5.5-inch display with 1080×1920 pixel resolution
- Processor: HiSilicon Kirin 935
- RAM: 3 GB
- Battery: 2700 mAh

=== Huawei Mate 8 ===
Released on 26 November 2015 in China and globally Q1 2016.

- Display: 6.0-inch display with 1080×1920 pixel resolution
- Processor: HiSilicon Kirin 950
- Ram: 4 GB

=== Huawei Mate 9 ===
Released December 2016

- Display: 5.9-inch display IPS LCD capacitive touchscreen
- Processor: HiSilicon Kirin 960
- Ram: 4 GB

=== Huawei Mate 10 ===
Released October 2017

- Display: 5.9-inch display with 1440 × 2560 pixels
- Processor: HiSilicon Kirin 970
- Ram: 6 GB

=== Huawei Mate SE ===
Huawei launched the Huawei Mate SE in the United States on March 6, 2018. It is an essentially a rebranded version of the international Honor 7X, as the Honor 7X smartphone that had previously been released in the United States was different from the international version.

- Display: 5.93-inch display with 1080×2160 pixel resolution
- Processor: HiSilicon Kirin 659
- Storage: 64 GB (expandable)
- RAM: 4 GB
- Battery: 3340 mAh
- Colors: Gray or Gold

=== Huawei Mate 20 ===
Huawei announced three phones in the Huawei Mate 20 series, the Huawei Mate 20, Huawei Mate 20 Pro, and Huawei Mate 20 X at an event in London, England on October 16, 2018, after announcing the cheaper Huawei Mate 20 lite in Berlin, Germany on August 31, 2018.

=== Huawei Mate X ===
The Mate X is Huawei's first foldable device. The phone offers an 8-inch OLED display that folds outwards, with a wraparound design. While folded, there is a 6.6-inch screen on the front and a 6.38-inch screen on the back.

=== Huawei Mate 30 ===
The Huawei Mate 30 and Pro versions were unveiled on September 19, 2019 in Munich, Germany and released on September 26, 2019 in China. They are the first models that could be released without pre-installed Google apps because of US sanctions.

=== Huawei Mate 40 ===
The Huawei Mate 40 and Pro versions were unveiled on October 22, 2020, and do not feature Google services. The Chinese variant featured the operating system HarmonyOS 2.0, marking the start of HarmonyOS as an operating system in the Mate series.

=== Huawei Mate X2 ===
The Huawei Mate X2 successor was unveiled on February 22, 2021, and do not feature Google services.

=== Huawei Mate Xs 2 ===
The Huawei Mate Xs 2 foldable smartphone was unveiled on April 22, 2022 which features the new HarmonyOS 2.0 operating system.

=== Huawei Mate 50 ===
The Huawei Mate 50, 50E and 50 Pro and 50 RS, the first phones in Mate Series with Huawei's in-house XMAGE imaging were unveiled on September 6, 2022 which features the new HarmonyOS 3.0 operating system.

=== Huawei Mate X3 ===
Huawei Mate X3 foldable was announced on March 23, 2023, and released April 8, 2023 with HarmonyOS 3.1 and EMUI 13.1 globally with Snapdragon 8+ Gen 1 4G chip.

=== Huawei Mate 60 ===
The Huawei Mate 60 series was officially launched on August 29, 2023, equipped with the HarmonyOS 4.0 operating system. The promotion emphasizes its ability to carry out satellite telephony through the Tiantong system, and the ability to send and receive short messages through the Beidou system.

According to third-party technical dismantling and analysis, this model is equipped with the Kirin 9000S SoC chipset developed by HiSilicon, which is a 7nm process chip. According to analysis this chip may have been produced by SMIC. The launch of the phone garnered significant attention, and was widely touted as a victory against US government sanctions intended to stop Chinese companies from producing or obtaining advanced chips. Huawei's breakthrough raised concerns within the US government that technological restrictions alone were unable to prevent Huawei from obtaining advanced chips: the U.S. Department of Commerce launched an investigation into the situation at the end of 2023.

=== Huawei Mate X5 ===
Huawei Mate X5 foldable was announced on September 8, 2023, and released September 16, 2023 with HarmonyOS 4 and included the new Kirin 9000s chip like Mate 60 series counterpart.

=== Huawei Mate XT ===
The Huawei Mate XT, also known as Huawei Mate XT Ultimate Design, is the world's first double-folding, or tri-fold, foldable smartphone. It was announced on September 10, 2024, and made available for pre-order in China the same day. It released in China on September 20, 2024, released in Q1 2025 in global markets with EMUI 14.2, global variant of HarmonyOS 4.2 and 4G.

=== Huawei Mate 70 ===
The Huawei Mate 70 series was released on November 26, 2024 with latest enhanced 7 nm Kirin 9020 chip that features complete self developed CPU cores for the first time and preinstalled with HarmonyOS 4.3. The SKU included the Pioneer Edition that bundled HarmonyOS NEXT/5.0 for early adopters in China.

=== Huawei Mate X6 ===
Huawei Mate X6 foldable released November 26, 2024 with HarmonyOS 4.3 standard SKUs. The SKU included the Pioneer Edition that bundled HarmonyOS NEXT/5.0 for early adopters in China with Kirin 9020 series chip. The device expanded in global markets with December 12 official announcement in Dubai and went on sale globally on January 6, 2025, with 4G, EMUI 15, HarmonyOS 4.3 global variant software on board.

=== Huawei Mate XTs ===
Mate XTs Ultimate Design, a sequel to Mate XT Ultimate Design has been released on September 4, 2025, running HarmonyOS 5.1 with improved Kirin 9020 chip debuted in Mate 70 series.

=== Huawei Mate 70 Air ===
Mate 70 Air, an Air variant of Mate 70 series has been released on November 6, 2025, running HarmonyOS 5.1 with 7 nm Kirin 9020 chip and has outsold Apple iPhone Air in the Chinese market of 120,000 units of the 47th week challenging struggling competitors in the Android market.

=== Huawei Mate 80 ===
Huawei Mate 80 series with Mate 80, Pro, Pro Max and RS Ultimate Design was announced on November 25, 2025, and went on sale November 28, 2025 officially with HarmonyOS 6 preinstalled with latest 5 nm Kirin 9030 and Kirin 9030 Pro chips with NearLink E2.0 on board that features the highest bright display of any smartphone in the market of 8,000 nits and featured 5G and 5GA as Huawei's 5A network enhance feature on status bar for the first time since Huawei Mate 40 series with 5G status bar.

=== Huawei Mate X7 ===
Huawei Mate X7 foldable was announced on November 25, 2025, and went officially on sale on November 28, 2025, with HarmonyOS 6 preinstalled with latest 5 nm Kirin 9030 Pro chipset with NearLink E2.0 on board. Huawei officially announced on November 27, 2025, 48 hours after press release conference, that Mate X7 will hit global markets with a December 11, 2025 press conference event in Dubai.

== Tablets ==
MatePad
2019	Huawei MatePad Pro
2020	Huawei MatePad
2021	Huawei MatePad 11
2021	Huawei MatePad Pro
2022	Huawei MatePad SE
2022	Huawei MatePad
2022	Huawei MatePad Pro 11
2022	Huawei MatePad C5e
2023	Huawei MatePad 11 (2023)
2023	MatePad Air
2023	Huawei MatePad 11.5
2023	Huawei MatePad Pro 13.2
2024	Huawei MatePad 11.5 S
2024	Huawei MatePad SE 11
2024	Huawei MatePad Pro 12.2 (2024)
2024	Huawei MatePad Pro 12.2(2024)
2024	Huawei MatePad SE 11
2024	Huawei MatePad Pro 12.2 (2024)
2024	Huawei MatePad Air (2024)
2024	Huawei MatePad 12X
2024	Huawei MatePad 11.5 (2024)
2024	Huawei MatePad Pro 13.2 (2025)
2025	Huawei MatePad 11.5 S(2025)
2025	Huawei MatePad Air (2025)
2025	Huawei MatePad Mini
2025	Huawei MatePad 12X (2025)
2025	Huawei MatePad Edge
2026	MatePad Pro Max

=== Huawei MatePad Pro ===
The Huawei MatePad Pro was announced on 25 November 2019 and was officially released on 12 December 2019. It is one of Huawei's devices to feature no Google services just like many of the company's other recently released devices but still retains Android 10 as the source code for EMUI 10.1. The tablet received mainly positive reviews from critics but was criticised for its camera and lack of a wide variety of apps.

=== Huawei MatePad ===
The Huawei MatePad was announced on 23 April 2020 and was officially released on 28 April 2020. It is one of Huawei's devices to feature no Google services just like many of the company's other recently released devices but still retains Android 10 as the source code for EMUI 10.1.

=== Huawei MatePad 11 ===
The Huawei MatePad 11 was announced June 2, 2021 during Huawei's HarmonyOS 2 launch and it was officially released on July 13, 2021. It is one of Huawei's first tablet devices to have HarmonyOS 2 pre-installed globally.

=== Huawei MatePad Pro ===
The Huawei MatePad Pro 2021 line of 10.8 and 12.6-inch tablets was announced on June 2, 2021, during Huawei's HarmonyOS 2 launch and it was officially released on June 25, 2021, globally which marks the world's first tablets to have HarmonyOS pre-installed.

=== Huawei MatePad SE ===
The Huawei MatePad SE was announced on April 28, 2022, and was officially released May 10, 2022 globally with HarmonyOS 2 pre-installed.

=== Huawei MatePad ===
The Huawei MatePad 10.4 2022 model was announced on May 13, 2022, which was released on the same day globally with Android 10 as the source code for EMUI 10.1 pre-installed.

=== Huawei MatePad Pro 11 ===
The Huawei MatePad Pro 11 was announced on July 27, 2022, during Huawei's HarmonyOS 3 launch and was released August 10, 2022 globally with HarmonyOS 3 pre-installed.

=== Huawei MatePad C5e ===
The Huawei MatePad C5e was announced on October 19, 2022, with Android 10 based EMUI and was released November 2022 with Android 10 pre-installed.

=== Huawei MatePad 11 (2023) ===
Huawei MatePad 11 (2023) model came with HarmonyOS 3.1 on March 31, 2023, and PaperMatte Edition in November 2023.

=== Huawei MatePad Air ===
Huawei MatePad Air model announced May 18, 2023 and released July 22, 2023, preinstalled with HarmonyOS 3.1. Alongside PaperMatte Edition on December 13, 2023, in European markets.

=== Huawei MatePad 11.5 ===
Huawei MatePad 11.5 model announced May 18, 2023 and released July 22, 2023 preinstalled with HarmonyOS 3.1.

=== Huawei MatePad Pro 13.2 ===
The Huawei MatePad Pro 13.2 was announced and released on September 25, 2023, during Huawei's Autumn New Product Launch Conference with HarmonyOS 4 pre-installed with Kirin 9000 W Wi-Fi only variant of Kirin 9000s.

On April 8, 2024, Huawei expanded the MatePad Pro 13.2-inch tablet line with a SIM card version on a SKU model called Collector's Edition with Kirin 9000s in black colour via Huawei VMALL in China.

On May 8, 2024, the company revealed poster for new colour variant expansion in China with MatePad Pro 13.2 tablet line that comes with GoPaint application pre-installed ahead of event on May 15, 2024.

=== Huawei MatePad 11.5 S ===
The Huawei MatePad 11.5 S was announced on May 7, 2024, for later release in the same month during Huawei's Innovative Product Launch in Dubai that comes with GoPaint pre-installed with HarmonyOS 4.2 software, Papermatte Edition in global markets.

=== Huawei MatePad SE 11 ===
Huawei MatePad SE 11 budget tablet went global via Huawei online store on June 9, 2024, with HarmonyOS 2.0 preinstalled.

=== Huawei MatePad Pro 12.2 (2024) ===
Huawei MatePad Pro 12.2 (2024) was launched on August 6, 2024, with Kirin T91 chip variant of Kirin 9000s and HarmonyOS 4.2 out of the box.

=== Huawei MatePad Air (2024) ===
Huawei MatePad Air (2024) Chinese variant of MatePad 12X was launched on August 6, 2024, with Kirin T90A chip and HarmonyOS 4.2 out of the box in China.

=== Huawei MatePad 12 X ===
Huawei launched global variant of MatePad Air dubbed as MatePad 12X with HarmonyOS 4.2 out of the box that included PaperMatte Display on September 19, 2024, and went on sale on October 22, 2024.

=== Huawei MatePad 11.5 (2024) ===
On October 30, 2024, Huawei launched the mid range MatePad 11.5 tablet with Kirin 8000 chipset and HarmonyOS 4.2 preinstalled.

=== Huawei MatePad Pro 13.2 (2025) ===
Huawei MatePad Pro 13.2 (2025) model was launched on November 26, 2024, standard version with Kirin T92 Octo-core SoC chip and HarmonyOS 4.3 out of the box while Pioneer SKU in China bundled HarmonyOS NEXT/5.0 out of the box for early adopters. The tablet went on sale on December 12, 2024. The global version was announced on February 18, 2025, with HarmonyOS 4.3 out of the box which went officially on sale on February 28, 2025, that included EU and UK markets.

=== Huawei MatePad Pro 12.2 (2025) ===
Huawei announced and released mid-range MatePad Pro 12.2 (2025) on May 15, 2025, with 7 nm Kirin T92A variant of Kirin T92 SoC chip with HarmonyOS 4.3 out of the box in China and globally that includes EU and UK markets.

=== Huawei MatePad 11.5 (2025) ===
Huawei announced mid range budget MatePad 11.5 on July 10, 2025, with a mid range budget Kirin T82B variant chip of Kirin 8 series with HarmonyOS 4.3 factory software out of the box.

=== Huawei MatePad 11.5 S (2025) ===
Huawei announced lower end mid range budget variant MatePad 11.5S on August 15, 2025, with HarmonyOS 5.0.1 (NEXT) out of the box in China with Octo-core Kirin chip which went on sale on August 21, 2025.

=== Huawei MatePad Air (2025) ===
Huawei announced MatePad Air 2025 mid range, Chinese variant of MatePad 12X 2025 that bundled with HarmonyOS 5.0.1 (NEXT) out of the box in China with Kirin 9000W.

=== Huawei MatePad Mini ===
Huawei announced the smaller compact affordable MatePad Mini 8.8' inch tablet on September 4, 2025, with HarmonyOS 5.1 with Kirin 9010 5G chip variant of Pura 70 series chip out of the box and went officially on sale in China on September 13, 2025. It has been the first mini tablet from Huawei since Huawei MatePad T8 in May 2020.

Huawei launched a Reading Edition SKU on December 1, 2024, with a price cut in China that include the same configurations as the standard SKU.

=== Huawei MatePad 12 X (2025) ===
Huawei announced and launched global variant of MatePad Air on September 19, 2025, a mid range tablet that features HarmonyOS 4.3 out of the box with Kirin T92B variant chip.

=== Huawei MatePad Edge ===
Huawei MatePad Edge 2-in-1 tablet PC officially announced on November 25, 2025, replacing MateBook E series that had Intel and Windows 11 Home edition. The MatePad Edge features HarmonyOS 5.1 that includes both tablet mode and PC mode with a 7 nm Kirin X90 PC series chip configuration out of the box with Kirin X90 powerful SKU features liquid cooling while lower end Kirin 90A SKU feature a soft screen like PaperMatte MatePad tablets with both SKUs featuring owl-like fans setup. It supports NearLink M-Pen for drawing. The software on MatePad Edge enables flexibility for users that enables native mobile, tablet and PC apps setup alongside compatibility utility of Android containers like EasyAbroad and DroiTong on tablet mode, alongside PC mode side with Oseasy and Kaimaster Armor Master for Windows 11 ARM-based virtual machine environments with a four swipe of the trackpad.

=== Huawei MatePad Pro Max ===
In 2026, Huawei launched the MatePad Pro Max, its thinnest and lightest high-end tablet to date, weighing about 509 grams in its PaperMatte version and measuring just 4.7 mm thick, featuring the classic 13.2“ screen size, it replaced the 12.2” MatePad Pro from 2025 and boasts a flexible OLED PaperMatte Display that delivers a massive 94% screen-to-body ratio with an ultra-thin 3.55 mm bezel. On the software side, the PaperMatte version features the Kirin T93 Pro, a 9-core processor.

The main purpose of this tablet is to be as useful as a PC, including apps like GoPaint and Huawei Notes, as well as incorporating the desktop version of WPS Office, which for the first time integrates AI tools, allowing to create documents, spreadsheets, and slide presentations with the help of artificial intelligence.

=== Huawei MatePad Air ===
On August 2026, Huawei presented the MatePad Air. An ultra-slim, productivity-focused 12-inch tablet featuring an OLED PaperMatte display and Kirin hardware. This tablet features a lighter version of the original MatePad with specs that keep it as one of the top tablets on the market. Its made for productivity, studying and creative work, helped by its light design and his practicity. It features an attachable keyboard that makes easier the work in this device.

== Accessories ==
=== Huawei M-Pen ===
Huawei M-Pen 3

The M-Pen or later the M-Pencil are a series of active pen developed for selected Mate smartphones, MatePad tablets and MateBook laptop computers, first released alongside the Mate 20 X in November 2018. The latest model, the M-Pencil Pro, was released in August 2025 and supports tactile feedback and NearLink tracking.

=== Huawei Wireless Mouse ===
The Huawei Wireless Mouse is a series of AI-powered, ergonomic wireless mouse designed for various Huawei PCs, laptops and tablets. It supports dual-mode data communication, with NearLink for ultra-low latency and strong anti-interference, and Bluetooth 5.4 for broad compatibility.

=== Huawei XMAGE Z10 ===
Huawei XMAGE Z10

The XMAGE Z10 is a detachable 1-10× power zooming modular camera launched in October 2026 for the flagship Mate 90 Pro Max and Mate 90 RS Ultimate Design, onto which the XMAGE Z10 fastens over the round camera module on the phone's back panel via a lens mount-like bayonet connector. The camera module draws power from the phone via a 3-pin springed connector, and imaging data from the Z10's internal 50 MP 1-inch RYYB image sensor is wirelessly synchronized to the phone via NearLink. There is a manual zoom adjustment ring that allows the user to operate the module like a conventional zoom lens, although the actual zooming is done via servomotors within the module.

== See also ==
- Huawei Pura series
- Huawei MateBook
- Huawei MateStation
- List of Huawei products
