= Huawei Mate X6 =

High-end foldable Huawei smartphone

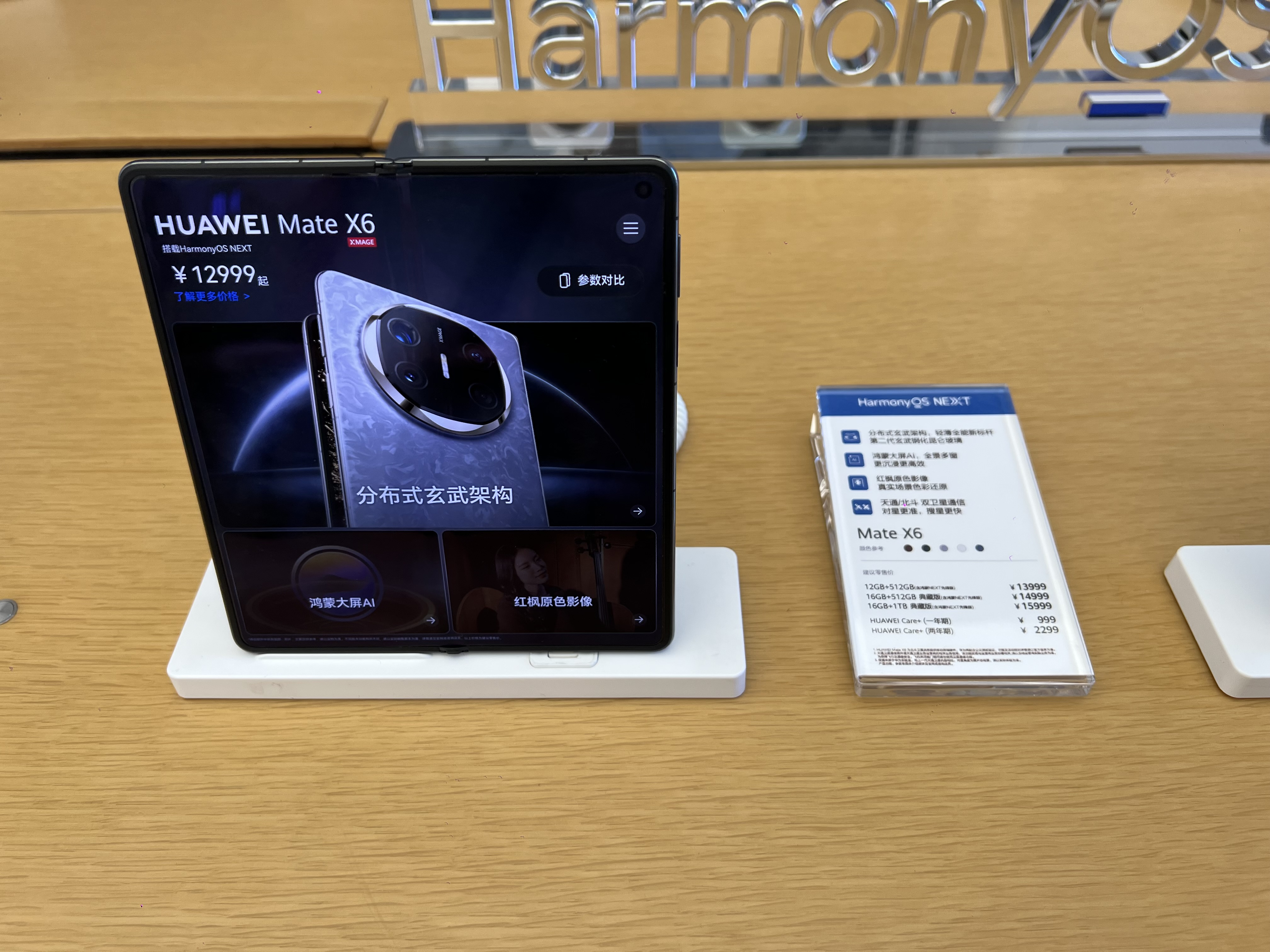
- Front panel of the Huawei Mate X6 (unfolded)
- Brand: Huawei
- Manufacturer: Huawei
- Series: Huawei Mate
- First released: November 26, 2024; 19 months ago
- Compatible networks: GSM, CDMA, HSPA, EVDO, LTE, 5G
- Colors: Black, White, Gray, Blue, Red
- Dimensions: Unfolded: 156.6 mm × 144.1 mm × 4.6 mm Folded: 156.6 mm × 73.8 mm × 9.9 mm
- Weight: 239 g (8.43 oz)
- Operating system: EMUI 15 (International); HarmonyOS 4.3 (China)
- System-on-chip: Kirin 9020 (7 nm)
- CPU: Octa-core (1x 2.5 GHz & 3x 2.15 GHz & 4x 1.53 GHz)
- GPU: Maleoon 920
- Memory: 12 GB or 16 GB LPDDR5X RAM
- Storage: 256 GB, 512 GB, or 1 TB UFS 4.x
- Removable storage: No
- Battery: 5110 or 5200 mAh Si/C Li-Ion; 66W wired charging 50W wireless charging
- Rear camera: Triple camera setup: • 50 MP, f/1.4-f/4.0, 24mm (wide), PDAF, OIS • 48 MP, f/3.0, 90mm (periscope telephoto), PDAF, OIS, 4x optical zoom • 40 MP, f/2.2, 13mm, 120˚ (ultrawide), PDAF; Features: Laser AF, color spectrum sensor, LED flash Video: 1080p / 4K
- Front camera: Inner camera: 8 MP, f/2.2 (wide); Cover camera: 8 MP, f/2.4 (wide); Video: 1080p / 4K
- Display: Main screen: 7.93 in (202.1 cm²), Foldable LTPO OLED, 120Hz, 2240 x 2440 pixels (~418 ppi density); Cover screen: 6.45 in, LTPO OLED, 120Hz, 1080 x 2440 pixels, Kunlun Glass 2
- Sound: Stereo speakers, no 3.5mm jack
- Connectivity: Wi-Fi 6 (802.11 a/b/g/n/ac/6), dual-band, Wi-Fi Direct; Bluetooth 5.2, A2DP, LE, L2HC; GPS (L1+L5), GLONASS (L1), BDS (B1I+B1c+B2a+B2b), GALILEO (E1+E5a+E5b), QZSS (L1+L5), NavIC; NFC, Infrared port, USB-C 3.1 (OTG, DisplayPort 1.2)
- Model: ICL-AL10, ICL-LX9
- Website: https://consumer.huawei.com/en/phones/mate-x6/

The Huawei Mate X6 is a high-end, foldable Android smartphone manufactured, designed, and marketed by Huawei. It was announced and released on November 26, 2024 in China, followed by a global release on December 12 in that year, holding at the launch event at Atlantis The Royal in Dubai.

== Release ==
Pre-orders for the Huawei Mate X6 opened just after noon on November 21, 2024, securing 600,000 non-deposit reservations on the Huawei Mall platform within the first five hours. The foldable smartphone was scheduled for an official launch alongside the Huawei Mate 70 series on November 26, 2024.

== Trade restrictions ==
The phone will not be available in the United States. Immediately after the launch, Joe Biden, 46th president of the United States, declared a trade restriction of the Mate X6, limiting processor exportation to 140 Chinese firms manufactured from Huawei.

== Specifications ==
=== Hardware ===
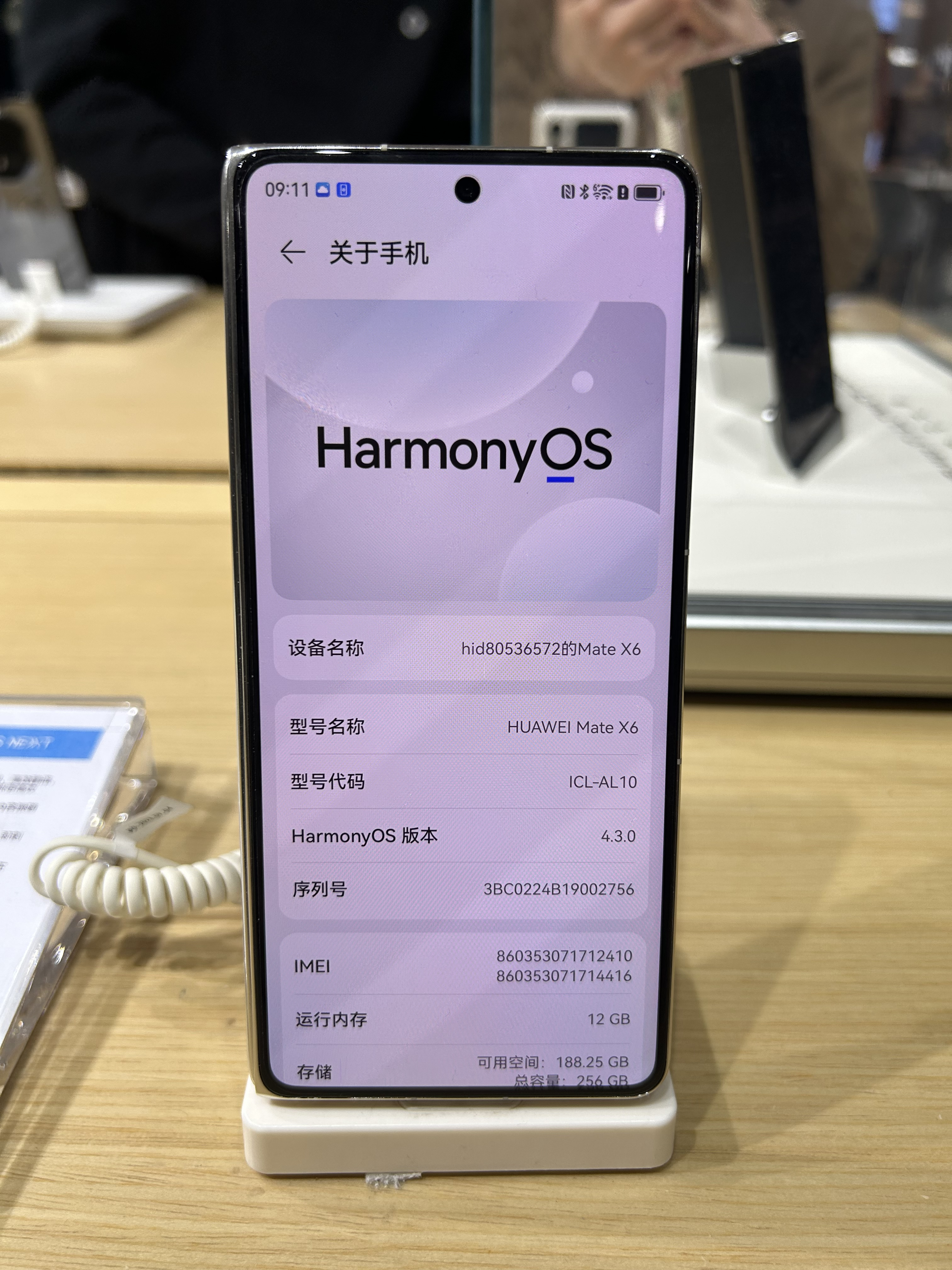
Mate X6, folded

==== Design and body ====
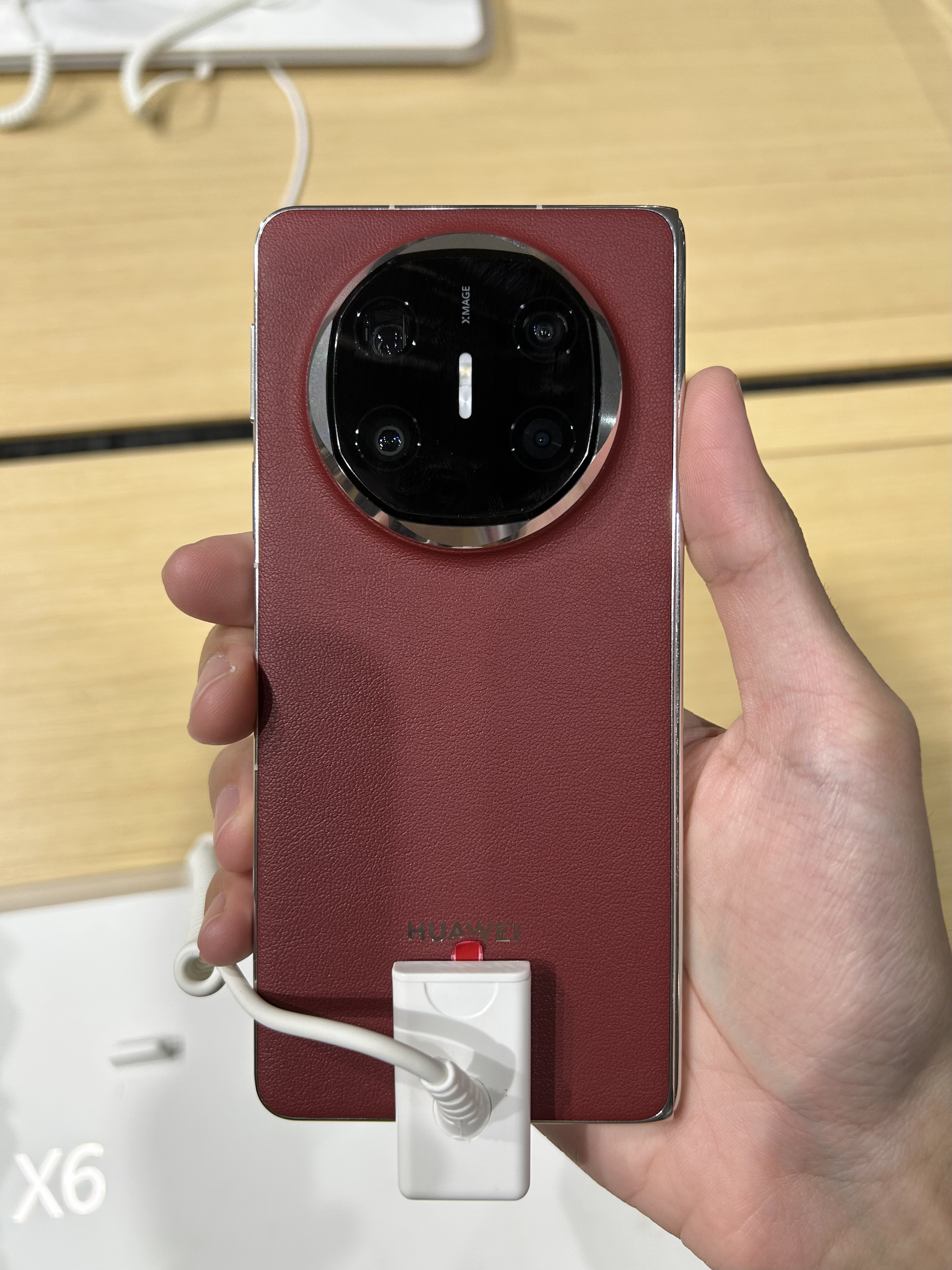
Rear panel of the Huawei Mate X6

The Huawei Mate X6 features a "book-style" folding design and similar to the Honor Magic V3. When unfolded mode, the device measures 156.6 mm × 144.1 mm × 4.6 mm, while folding the device reduces its footprint to 156.6 mm × 73.8 mm × 9.9 mm. It weighs approximately 239 grams.

The structural frame is constructed from aerospace-grade aluminum. Depending on the color variant, the rear panel is composed of either nylon fiber or a silicone polymer designed to mimic eco-leather. The smartphone features an IPX8 rating for water resistance, allowing immersion in up to 2 meters of fresh water for up to 30 minutes.

The device is available in multiple color options, including Nebula Red, Black, and a Nebula Gray edition. The Nebula Gray variant features a textured finish produced using an innovative material called "Vegan Fiber" via Micro-Nano 3D Topography.

==== Chipset and Memory ====
The Mate X6 is powered by an in-house octa-core HiSilicon Kirin 9020 system-on-chip (SoC) built on a 7 nm process. The CPU configuration comprises one high-performance Taishan Big core clocked at 2.5 GHz, three mid-performance Taishan Mid cores at 2.15 GHz, and four power-efficient Cortex-A510 cores clocked at 1.53 GHz. Graphics processing is handled by an integrated Maleoon 920 GPU.

The device does not feature expandable storage. It is available in multiple internal memory configurations pairing UFS 4.0 storage with LPDDR4X RAM:

- 256 GB storage with 12 GB RAM
- 512 GB storage with 12 GB RAM
- 512 GB storage with 16 GB RAM
- 1 TB storage with 16 GB RAM

=== Displays ===
The device utilizes a 7.93-inch foldable LTPO OLED panel with a resolution of 2240 × 2440 pixels (~418 ppi density). It supports 1 billion colors, a 120 Hz adaptive refresh rate, HDR Vivid, and has a peak brightness of 1,800 nits. In the cover, it features a 6.45-inch LTPO OLED panel with a resolution of 1080 × 2440 pixels (~413 ppi density). It features a 120 Hz refresh rate, a peak brightness of 2,500 nits, and is protected by second-generation Kunlun Glass.

=== Battery and charging ===
The device is powered by a non-removable silicon-carbon (Si/C) battery with a capacity of either 5,110 mAh or 5,200 mAh (depending on the region or hardware version). It supports 66W wired fast charging, 50W wireless fast charging, 7.5W reverse wireless charging, and 5W reverse wired charging via USB OTG.

=== Cameras ===
==== Rear camera ====
Similar to the camera design of the Honor’s Magic V3, the Mate X6 features a Leica-branded triple-camera array equipped with a color spectrum sensor and laser autofocus:

Huawei Mate X6 Camera Array
Specification	Resolution	Features
Main (Wide angle)	50MP, f/1.4 to f/4.0	24mm focal length, PDAF and OIS
Periscope / Telephoto	48MP, f/3.0	90mm focal length, PDAF, and 4x optical zoom (+100x digital zoom)
Ultrawide	40MP, f/2.2	13mm focal length, PDAF, and 120-degree POV

The rear camera video capture maxes out at 4K and 1080p resolutions, utilizing gyro-electronic image stabilization (gyro-EIS), OIS, and HDR Vivid format.

==== Front camera ====
The smartphone utilizes two 8 MP with f/2.2 aperture for the folded and unfolded conditions. Both front cameras support HDR, panorama tracking, and up to 4K video recording.

=== Software ===
The phone operates on two separate software builds depending on market distribution. In mainland China, it ships with HarmonyOS 4.3, whereas international markets receive the device running EMUI 15, both layered over an open-source Android foundation without pre-installed Google Mobile Services.
