= Huawei Mate 40 =

High-end Android phablet series by Huawei

Huawei Mate 40 Huawei Mate 40 Pro Huawei Mate 40 Pro+ Huawei Mate 40 RS Porsche Design
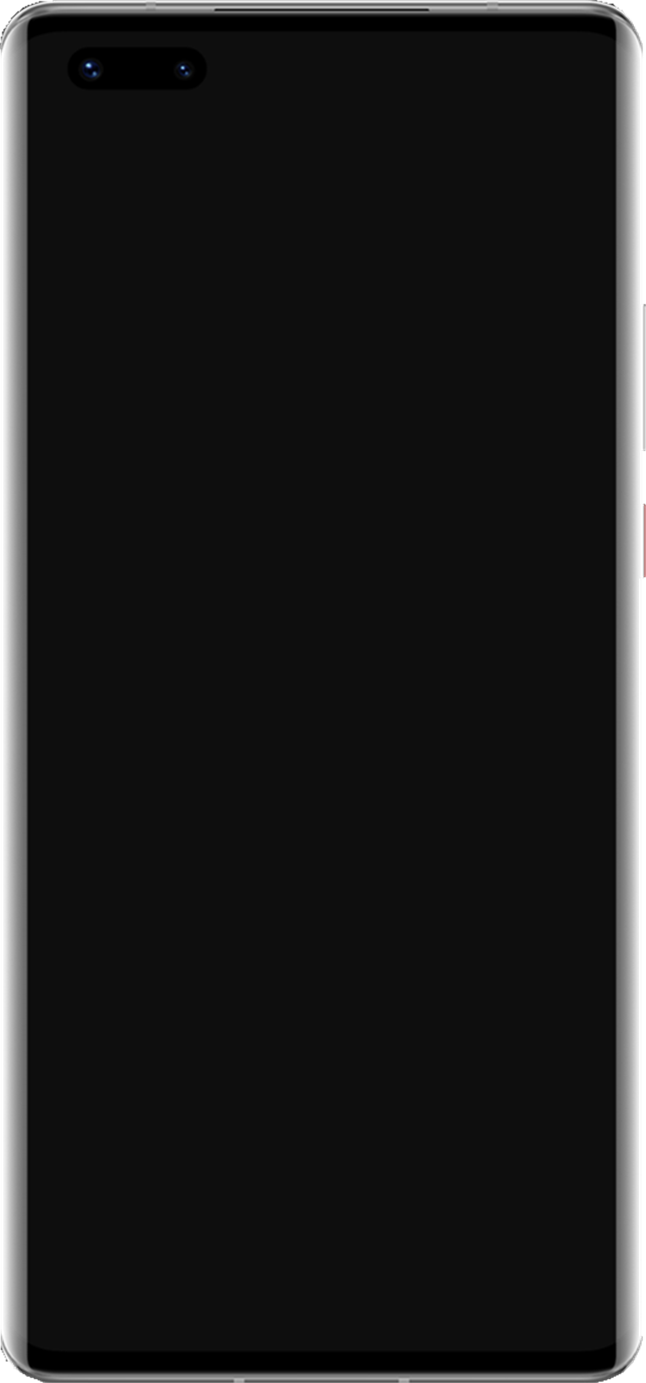
- Huawei Mate 40 Pro
- Brand: Huawei
- Manufacturer: Huawei
- Type: Phablet
- Series: Huawei Mate series
- First released: October 22, 2020; 5 years ago and June 18, 2021; 5 years ago (HarmonyOS China variant)
- Predecessor: Huawei Mate 30
- Successor: Huawei Mate 50
- Related: Huawei P40
- Compatible networks: 2G, 3G, 4G, 4G LTE, 5G
- Form factor: Slate
- Dimensions: Mate 40 158.6 mm (6.24 in) H 72.5 mm (2.85 in) W 8.8 mm (0.35 in); Mate 40 Pro/Pro+ 162.9 mm (6.41 in) H 75.5 mm (2.97 in) W 8.8–9.1 mm (0.35–0.36 in)
- Weight: Mate 40: 188 g (6.6 oz); Mate 40 Pro: 212 g (7.5 oz); Mate 40 Pro+: 230 g (8.1 oz)
- Operating system: EMUI 13, based on Android 12 (SDK ROM); HarmonyOS 2.0 (China 2021 variant); Current: China: HarmonyOS 4.2
- System-on-chip: HiSilicon Kirin 9000/9000E
- CPU: Octa-core (1x3.13 GHz Cortex-A77 & 3x2.54 GHz Cortex-A77 & 4x2.05 GHz Cortex-A55)
- GPU: Mali-G78 MP22/MP24
- Memory: Mate 40/Pro: 8 GB RAM; Mate 40 Pro+: 12 GB RAM
- Storage: Mate 40: 128 or 256 GB UFS 3.1; Mate 40 Pro/Pro+: 256 GB UFS 3.1; Mate 40 RS Porsche Design: 512 GB UFS 3.1
- Removable storage: Nano Memory, expandable up to 256 GB
- SIM: nanoSIM
- Battery: Mate 40: 4200 mAh; Mate 40 Pro/Pro+: 4400 mAh
- Charging: Mate 40: 40 W wired + 40W wireless + reverse wireless charging; Mate 40 Pro/Pro+ 66 W, 50 W wireless, reverse wireless charging
- Rear camera: All: 50 MP Wide (f/1.9, 23mm, 1/1.28", 2.44µm, PDAF, Laser AF), Dual Pixel PDAF, Leica optics, gyro-EIS, HDR, LED flash, 4K@30/60fps, 1080p@30/60/120/240/480fps; Mate 40 Pro: In addition to above: + 20 MP Ultrawide (f/1.8, 18mm, PDAF) + 12 MP Telephoto (f/3.4, 125mm, PDAF, OIS), 720p@960/3840fps; Mate 40 Pro+: In addition to Mate 40: OIS, + 20 MP Ultrawide (f/2.4, 14mm, PDAF), + 8 MP Telephoto (f/4.4, 240mm, PDAF, OIS) + 12 MP Telephoto (f/2.4, 80mm, PDAF, OIS) + time-of-flight sensor
- Front camera: 13 MP, f/2.4, 18mm
- Display: Mate 40: 6.5 in (170 mm) 1080 × 2376 OLED, (402 ppi), 19.8:9 aspect ratio, 90 Hz refresh rate; Mate 40 Pro/Pro+: 6.76 in (172 mm) 1344 × 2772 OLED, (456 ppi), 18.5:9 aspect ratio, 90 Hz refresh rate
- Sound: Stereo speakers
- Connectivity: Wi-Fi, 802.11a/b/g/n/ac/6 with Wi-Fi Direct support, BT5.2, BLE, USB Type C 3.1
- Data inputs: GPS/Glonass/BDS/Galileo/QZSS, accelerometer, gyroscope, compass, proximity sensor
- Water resistance: Mate 40: IP53; Mate 40 Pro & Pro+: IP68, up to 1.5 m (4.9 ft) for 30 minutes
- Codename: Ark/Ocean (Mate 40); Noah (Mate 40 Pro/Pro+)
- Website: Mate 40; Mate 40 Pro; Mate 40 Pro+; Mate 40 Porsche Design

Huawei Mate 40, Huawei Mate 40 Pro, Huawei Mate 40 Pro Plus and Huawei Mate 40 RS Porsche Design is a high-end Android and HarmonyOS based phablets developed by Huawei for its Mate series, succeeding the Huawei Mate 30 range. They were released on October 22, 2020, at Huawei's Online Global Launch Event.

== Design ==
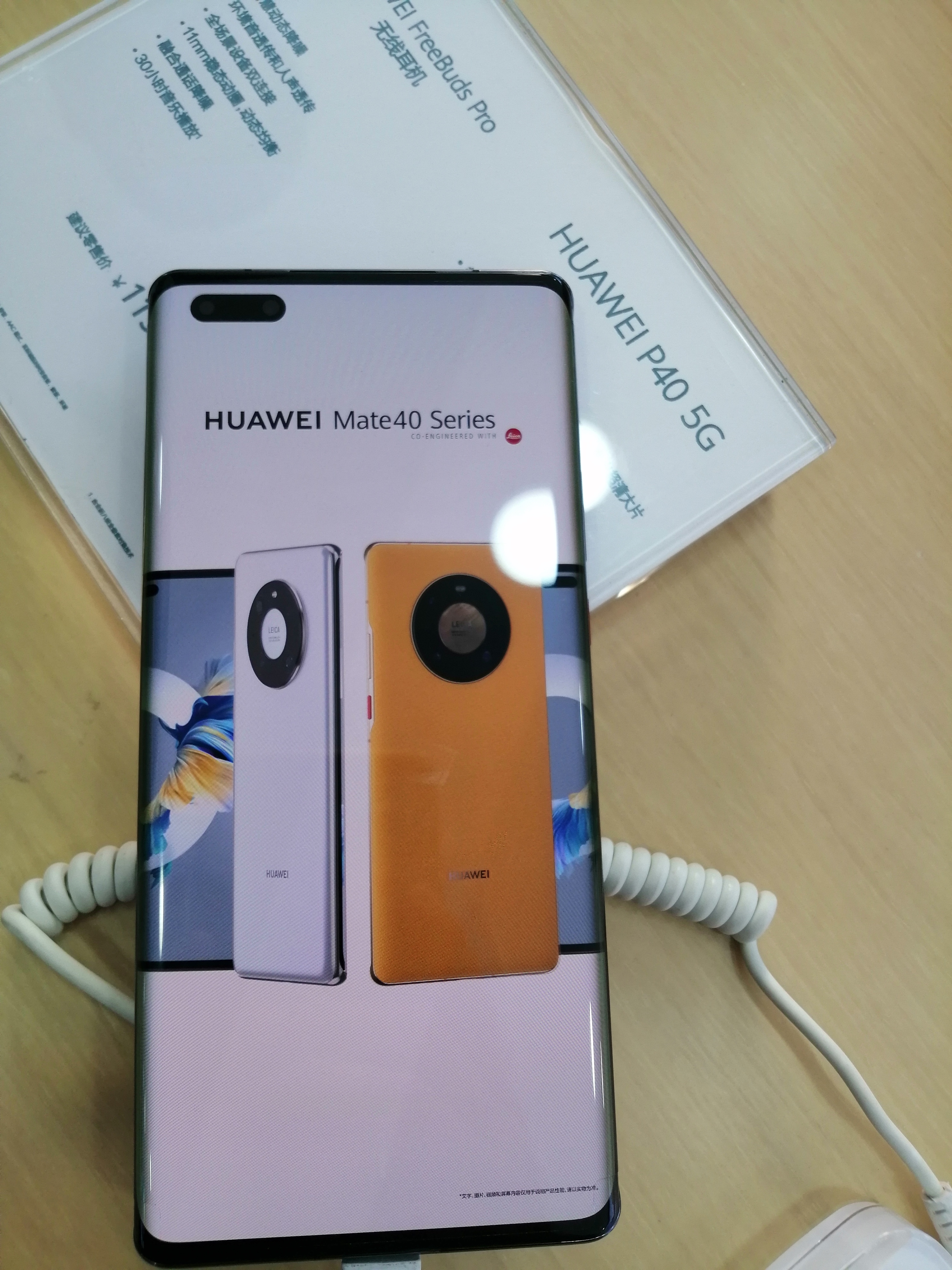
The front side of Huawei Mate 40 Pro

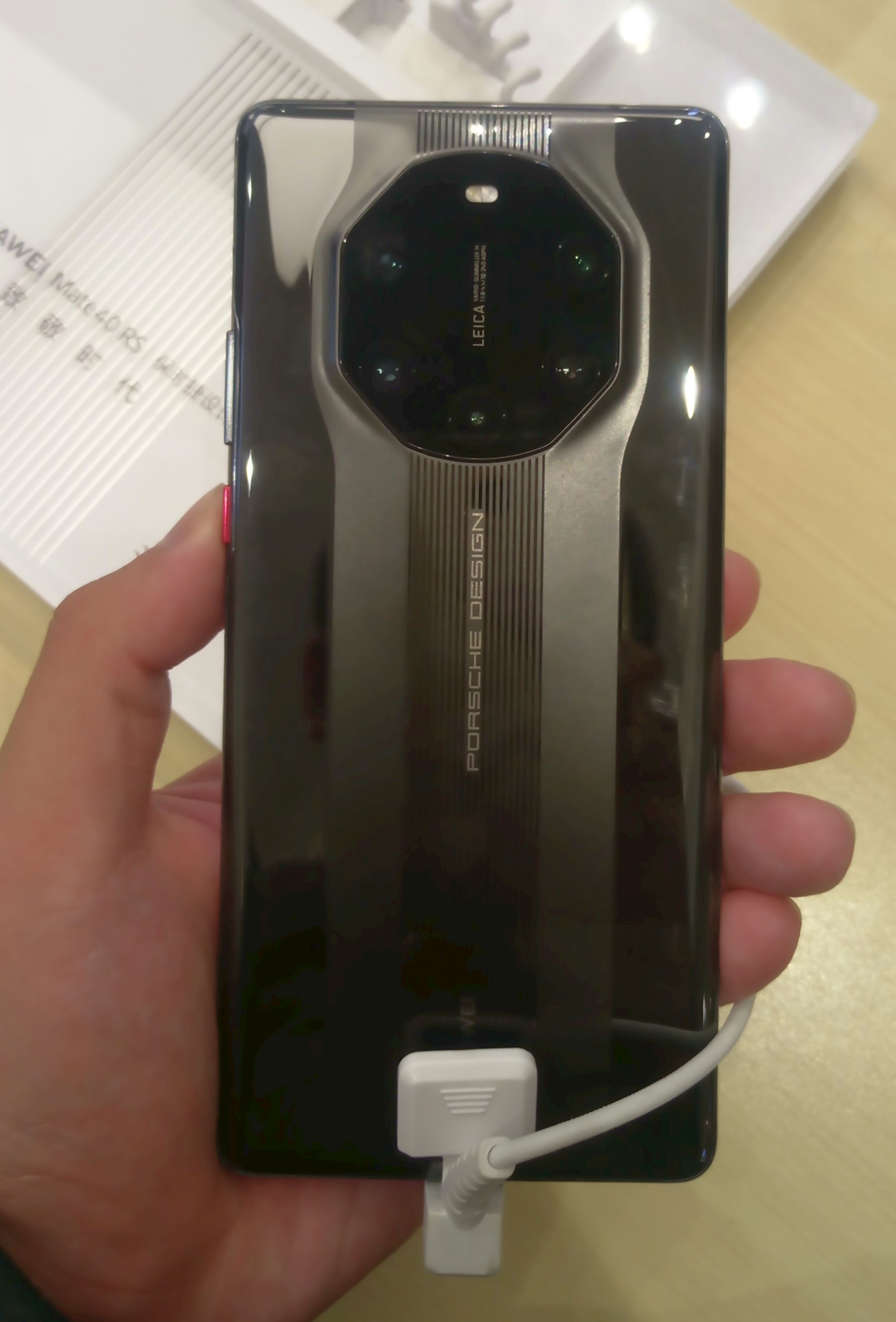
Mate 40 RS Porsche Design

The Mate 40 and Mate 40 Pro are constructed with an anodized aluminum frame and Gorilla Glass or artificial leather backing. The Mate 40 Pro+ uses ceramic for both the frame and the back. The notch on the Mate 30 series has been replaced by a cutout in the upper left-hand corner. The Mate 40 has a circular cutout for the front-facing camera; the Mate 40 Pro and Mate 40 Pro+ have a larger pill-shaped cutout also accommodating the infrared facial recognition system. On the Mate 40 Pro and Mate 40 Pro+, the screen is dramatically curved like the Mate 30 Pro, but has physical volume buttons. Unlike the P40 series, the Mate 40 series uses a traditional earpiece speaker instead of an “electromagnetic levitation” speaker that vibrates the top of the phone's screen; the top edge has an IR blaster. The rear camera setup of the three main phones is housed in a distinct ring shape, called the Space Ring camera system, which Huawei says represents "a window to explore the world." The Space Ring camera system is similar to their predecessor, the Mate 30. The center of the ring is the same glass and color as the rest of the back, and the cameras and dual flash are arranged within the ring, with the flash being on top on all the models. The Mate 40 and Mate 40 Pro are available in Mystic Silver, White and Black (glass), and Green and Yellow (artificial leather). The Mate 40 Pro+ is available in Ceramic White or Ceramic Black. Additionally, all Mate 40 models have an IP68 rating, apart from Mate 40 which has an IP53 rating.

== Specifications ==
=== Hardware ===
==== Chipset ====
The Mate 40 series is powered by the Kirin 9000 and Kirin 9000E, which are HiSilicon's first 5 nm system on chips based on TSMCˋs 5 nm FinFET (EUV) technology. The Mate 40 uses the Kirin 9000E, which has less GPU and NPU cores. Both system-on-chips allow for standard 5G connectivity, however only "sub-6" is available, meaning the Mate 40 series is not compatible with ultra-fast millimeter wave (mmWave) networks.

==== Display ====
All the Mate 40 models have an OLED Horizon Display, with curved glass on either side of the display that wraps 68° around the edge on the Mate 40 and 88° around the edge on the others. Collectively, the phones have a 90 Hz display with a 240 Hz touch sampling rate. The Mate 40 has a 6.5 in (170 mm) display with a 1080 × 2376 resolution, ~402 PPI density, and a ~89.3% screen-to-body ratio. Both the Mate 40 Pro and Mate 40 Pro+ have a 6.76 in (172 mm) with a 1344 × 2772 resolution, ~456 PPI, with 18.5:9 aspect ratio and ~94.1% screen-to-body ratio.

==== Battery ====
The Mate 40 has a 4,200 mAh lithium polymer battery, while all the other models had a 4,400 mAh battery. The Mate 40 supports 40 W fast charging, while the others support 66 W fast charging. The others also support 50 W wireless charging and 5 W reverse wireless charging.

==== Storage ====
All three phone models have UFS 3.1 storage in varying amounts. The Mate 40 has 2 storage configurations, 128 or 256 GB, with 8 GB RAM in both. The Mate 40 Pro has 256 GB of storage and 8 GB of RAM, while the Mate 40 Pro+ has 256 as well but 12 GB of RAM. The Mate 40 RS Porsche Design has the most storage and RAM with 512 GB and 12 GB, respectively. All the model's storage can be expanded via Huawei's proprietary Nano Memory, up to 256 GB in addition to the internal storage.

==== Camera ====
The Huawei Mate 40 series features Leica optics with similar cameras to the P40. The Mate 40 has a total of 3 cameras: a 50 MP f/1.9 RYYB wide main camera, an 8 MP f/2.4 3X telephoto camera, a 16 MP f/2.2 ultrawide camera. The Mate 40 Pro has a similar triple-camera setup, with arranged in identical manner. The setup consists of a 50 MP f/1.9 wide main camera, same as the Mate 40, a higher resolution 12 MP f/3.4 periscope telephoto and a higher resolution 20 MP ultrawide camera. The Mate 40 Pro+ has a Penta-camera setup, meaning it has 5 separate rear cameras. It has a 50 MP f/1.9 wide, just like the two lower-end models but with OIS, a 12 MP f/2.4 telephoto lens, an 8 MP f/4.4 periscope telephoto lens, capable of up to 10x optical zoom, an industry-first free-form lens 20 MP f/2.4 ultrawide for less distortion, and ToF depth sensor. The luxury model, the Mate 40 RS Porsche Design, carries the same penta-camera setup as the Mate 40 Pro+ just without free-form ultrawide. But, design-wise, lacks the Space Ring, instead opting for a large, octagonal protrusion without an opening in the center.

All the phones' main cameras are capable of video up to 4K resolution at up to 60 frames per second (fps). The main sensors are also equipped with laser autofocus. The Mate 40 Pro and Pro+ can shoot slow motion at up to 3840 fps while the Mate 40 only goes up to 960 fps.

=== Software ===
The Mate 40 series come with Android 10 and Huawei's software overlay, EMUI 11. Due to US restrictions, no Google apps, including the Google Play Store, are preloaded or downloadable on any of the Mate 40 phones. The Mate 40 series support Huawei Mobile Services uses Huawei AppGallery as its main app store.

== See also ==
- Huawei Mate 30
- Huawei Mate 50
- List of Huawei phones
