= Huawei MateStation =

Line of all-in-one and thin client desktop computers line by Huawei

Huawei MateStation series
- Developer: Huawei
- Product family: Huawei MateStation
- Type: Personal computers, Thin client PCs, All-in-one computers
- Released: AMD-based; September 13, 2021; 5 years ago (MateStation S); September 23, 2021; 5 years ago (MateStation X); November 2, 2022; 3 years ago (MateStation X 2022); Intel-based; April 28, 2022; 4 years ago (Huawei MateStation S 2022); November 2, 2023; 2 years ago (MateStation X 2023)
- Operating system: Microsoft Windows; HarmonyOS
- Website: Huawei – MateStation

Huawei MateStation is a family of flagship small form factor (SFF) personal computers designed primarily for thin client and all-in-one desktop computers. The MateStation line is part of Huawei's consumer and enterprise desktop offerings since its debut in China and the global market since September 2021. It is an extension of the MateBook series line of laptop computers, which is namesaked from the high-end Mate series line of mobile device. Like its other "Mate" sisters, the MateStation is associated with HarmonyOS, Huawei's "1+8+N" ecosystem integrated with Huawei PC Manager and Huawei Share connectivity.

== Products ==
Name	Release date	Processor	RAM	Storage	Screen size	Colours
MateStation X 2023	November 2, 2023	Intel Core i9-12900H Processor	16GB	512GB	28.2 inch/614.16 mm	Space Gray
MateStation X 2022	November 2, 2022	AMD Ryzen 7 5800H Processor	16GB	512GB	28.2 inch/614.16 mm	Space Gray
MateStation S	April 2022	Intel 10th Gen i5 processor/ i7	8GB/16GB	1TB/256GB	-	Space Gray
MateStation X	September 23, 2021	AMD Ryzen 5 5600H Processor	16GB	512GB	28.2 inch/614.16 mm	Space Gray
MateStation S	September 13, 2021	AMD Ryzen 5 4600G processor	8GB	256GB	-	Space Gray

== See also ==
- Huawei MateBook series
- Huawei Mate series
- Huawei P series
