= Huawei Mate 50 =

Series of high-end EMUI and Harmony OS-based smartphones developed by Huawei

Huawei Mate 50 Huawei Mate 50 Pro Huawei Mate 50 RS Porsche Design
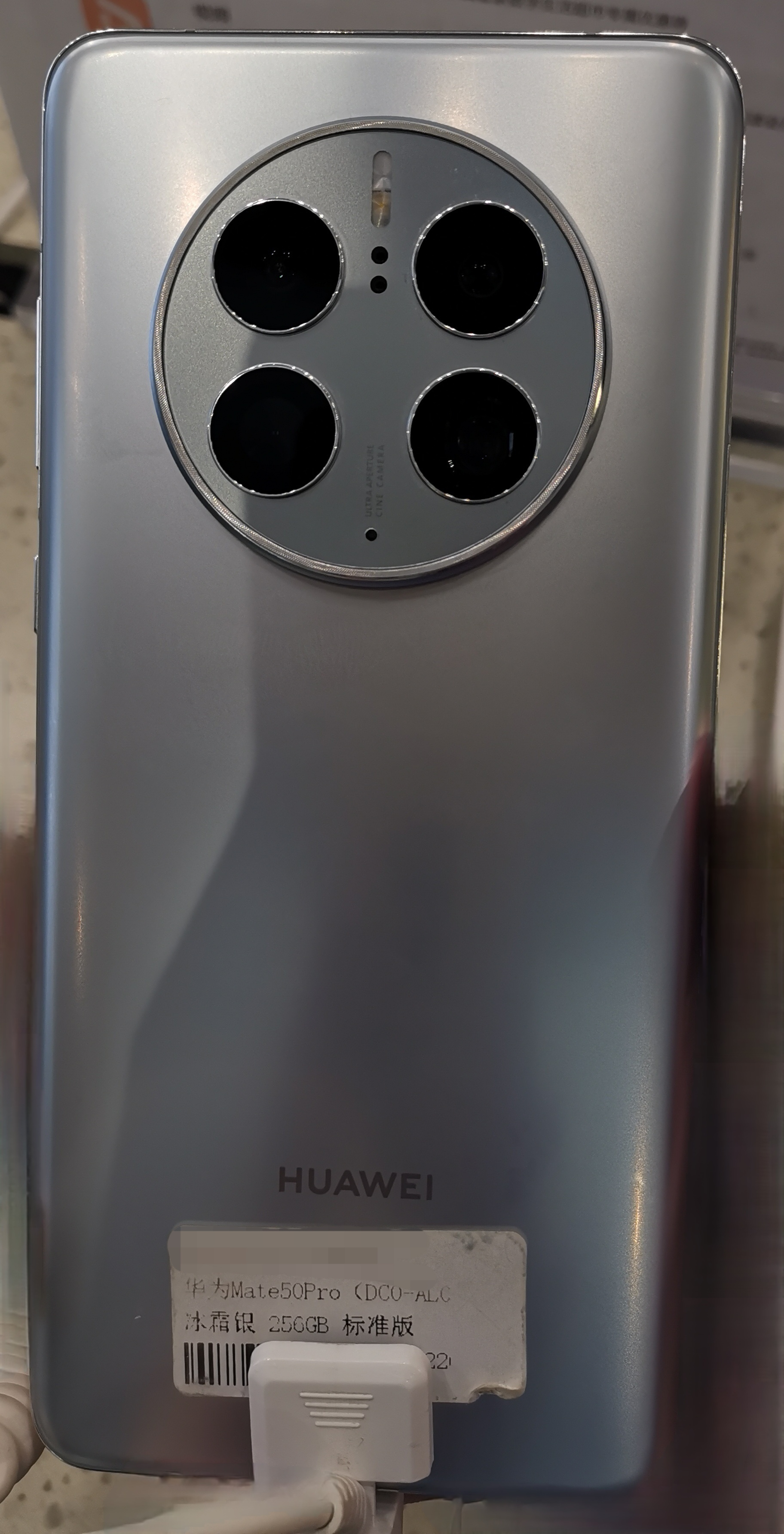
- Brand: Huawei
- Manufacturer: Huawei
- Type: Smartphone
- Series: Huawei Mate series
- First released: September 28, 2022; 3 years ago
- Predecessor: Huawei Mate 40
- Successor: Huawei Mate 60
- Compatible networks: GSM / CDMA / HSPA / CDMA2000 / LTE
- Form factor: Slate
- Dimensions: 50: 161.5 mm (6.36 in) H 76.1 mm (3.00 in) W 8 mm (0.31 in) D; 50 Pro: 162.1 mm (6.38 in) H 75.5 mm (2.97 in) W 8.5 mm (0.33 in) D; 50 RS Porsche Design: 162.1 mm (6.38 in) H 75.5 mm (2.97 in) W 9.92 mm (0.391 in) D
- Weight: 50: 206 g (7.3 oz); 50 Pro: 209 g (7.4 oz); 50 RS Porsche Design: 232 g (8.2 oz)
- Operating system: International: EMUI 13; China: HarmonyOS 3 Current: China: HarmonyOS 4.2 International: EMUI 14.2
- System-on-chip: Qualcomm SM8425 Snapdragon 8+ Gen 1 4G (4 nm)
- CPU: Octa-core (1x3.19 GHz Cortex-X2 & 3x2.75 GHz Cortex-A710 & 4x2.0 GHz Cortex-A510)
- GPU: Adreno 730
- Memory: 8/12 GB RAM
- Storage: 128, 256, 512 GB
- SIM: Single SIM (Nano-SIM) or Hybrid Dual SIM (Nano-SIM, dual stand-by)
- Battery: 50: Li-Po 4460 mAh; 50 Pro/50 RS Porsche Design: Li-Po 4700 mAh
- Charging: Fast charging 66W; Wireless charging 50W; Reverse wireless charging 5W
- Rear camera: 50: 50 MP, RYYB, f/1.4-f/4.0, 24mm (wide), omnidirectional PDAF, Laser AF; 12 MP, RYYB, f/3.4, 125mm (periscope telephoto), PDAF, OIS, 5x optical zoom; 13 MP, f/2.2, 13mm, 120˚ (ultrawide), PDAF; 50 Pro: 50 MP, RYYB, f/1.4-f/4.0, 24mm (wide), omnidirectional PDAF, Laser AF, OIS; 64 MP, RYYB, f/3.5, 90mm (periscope telephoto), PDAF, OIS, 3.5x optical zoom; 13 MP, f/2.2, 13mm, 120˚ (ultrawide), PDAF; 50 RS Porsche Design: 50 MP, RYYB, f/1.4-f/4.0, 24mm (wide), omnidirectional PDAF, Laser AF, OIS; 48 MP, f/3.0, 90mm (periscope telephoto macro), PDAF, OIS, 3.5x optical zoom; 13 MP, f/2.2, 13mm, 120˚ (ultrawide), PDAF; All: LED flash, panorama, HDR; 4K@30/60fps, 1080p@30/60/120/240fps, 1080p@960fps, gyro-EIS
- Front camera: 13 MP, f/2.4, 18mm (ultrawide); 50 Pro and 50 RS Porsche Design: TOF 3D, (depth/biometrics sensor); HDR, panorama; 4K@30/60fps, 1080p@30/60/240fps
- Display: 50: 6.7 in (170 mm) 1224 x 2700 px resolution (~442 ppi density); 50 Pro/RS Porsche Design: 6.74 in (171 mm) 1212 x 2616 px resolution, 19.5:9 ratio (~428 ppi density); 50: OLED, 1B colors, 90Hz refresh rate; 50 Pro/50 RS Porsche Design: OLED, 1B colors, 120Hz refresh rate
- Sound: Stereo speakers
- Connectivity: Wi-Fi 802.11 a/b/g/n/ac/ax(6), dual-band, Wi-Fi Direct, hotspot Bluetooth 5.2, A2DP, LE; DisplayPort 1.2
- Data inputs: Multi-touch screen; USB Type-C 3.1; Fingerprint scanner (under display, optical); Accelerometer; Gyroscope; Proximity sensor; Barometer; Compass; Color spectrum
- Website: consumer.huawei.com/en/phones/mate50/; consumer.huawei.com/en/phones/mate50-pro/; consumer.huawei.com/en/phones/porsche-design-mate50-rs/

The Huawei Mate 50 is a series of EMUI-based smartphone manufactured by Huawei. They were announced on September 6, 2022 and released on September 28, 2022.
