= Huawei Mate 20 =

Android-based smartphone line by Huawei

Huawei Mate 20 / Mate 20 Pro / Mate 20 X
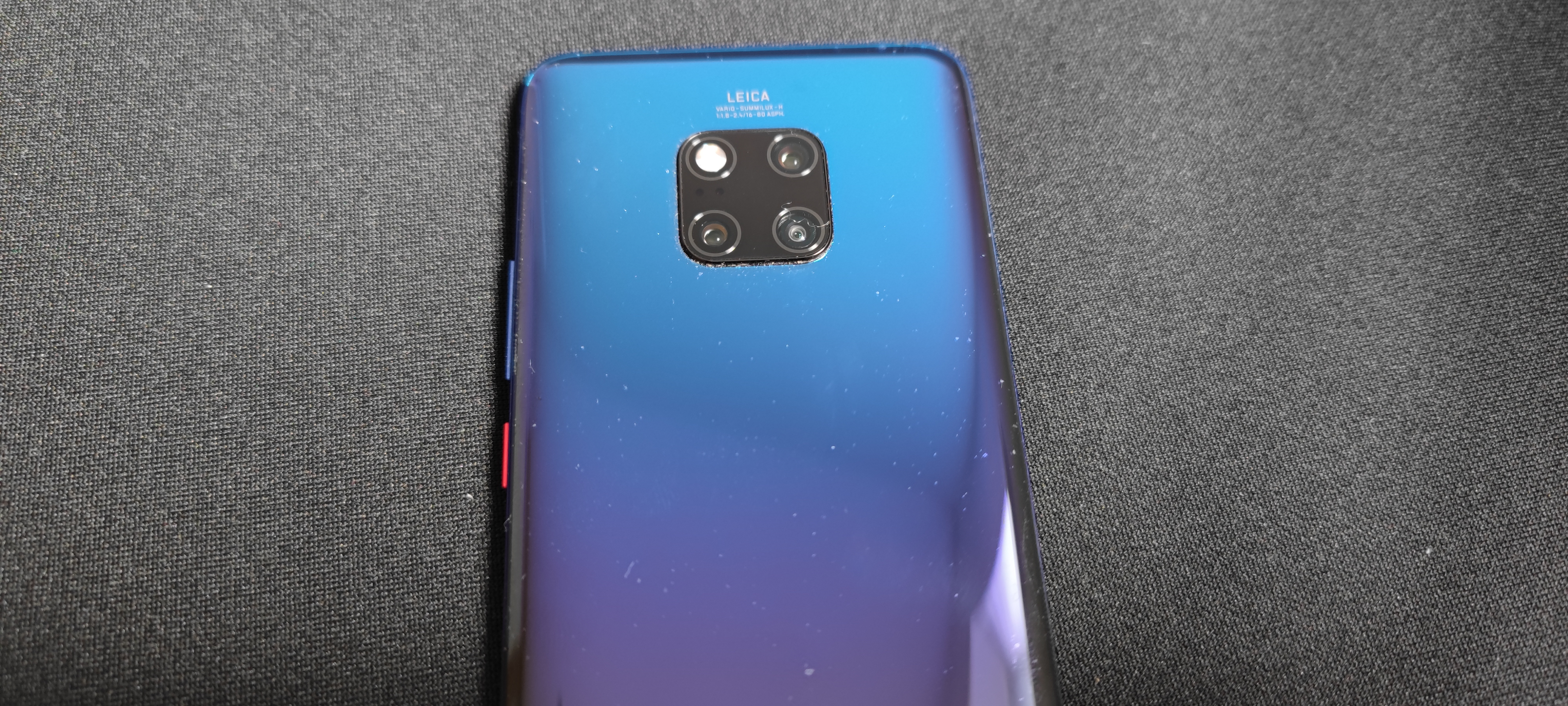
- Manufacturer: Huawei
- Type: Smartphone
- Series: Huawei Mate
- First released: 16 October 2018; 7 years ago
- Discontinued: October 17, 2019; 6 years ago
- Predecessor: Huawei Mate 10
- Successor: Huawei Mate 30
- Related: Huawei P20 Pro
- Form factor: Phablet
- Dimensions: Mate 20: 158.2 mm (6.23 in) H; 77.2 mm (3.04 in) W; 8.3 mm (0.33 in) D; Mate 20 Pro: 157.8 mm (6.21 in) H; 72.3 mm (2.85 in) W; 8.6 mm (0.34 in) D; Mate 20 X: 174.6 mm (6.87 in) H; 85.4 mm (3.36 in) W; 8.2 mm (0.32 in) D
- Weight: Mate 20: 188 g (6.6 oz); Mate 20 Pro: 189 g (6.7 oz); Mate 20 X: 232 g (8.2 oz)
- Operating system: Android 10 with EMUI 10.1; Current: China: HarmonyOS 4
- System-on-chip: Kirin 980
- CPU: Octa-core (2x 2.6 GHz Cortex A76, 2x 1.92 GHz Cortex A76, 4x 1.8 GHz Cortex A55)
- GPU: Mali-G76 MP10
- Memory: Mate 20: 4 or 6 GB; Mate 20 Pro: 6 or 8 GB; Mate 20 X: 6 GB
- Storage: 128 or 256 GB UFS 2.1
- Removable storage: Huawei Nano Memory up to 256 GB
- SIM: nanoSIM
- Battery: Mate 20: 4000 mAh Li-Po; Mate 20 Pro: 4200 mAh Li-Po; Mate 20 X: 5000 mAh Li-Po
- Charging: Fast battery charging: 18/22.5/40W Supercharge; Wireless: 15W; Backwards Charging
- Rear camera: Mate 20: Triple: 12 MP Wide (f/1.8, 27mm, 1/2.3") + 16 MP Ultrawide (f/2.2, 17mm) + 8 MP Telephoto (f/2.4, 52mm), Leica optics, optical zoom, phase detection and laser AF, dual-LED dual-tone flash Other models: Triple: 40 MP IMX600 Wide (f/1.8, 1/1.7", 27mm) + 20 MP Ultrawide (f/2.2, 1/2.7", 16mm) + 8 MP Telephoto (f/2.4, 1/4", 80mm), Leica optics, 5x optical zoom, phase detection and laser AF, dual-LED dual-tone flash
- Front camera: 24 MP (f/2.0, 26mm)
- Display: Mate 20: 6.53 in (166 mm) 2244x1080, IPS LCD, 381 ppi; Mate 20 Pro; 6.39 in (162 mm) 3120x1440, AMOLED, 538 ppi; Mate 20 X; 7.2 in (180 mm) 2244x1080, AMOLED, 346 ppi
- Connectivity: Wi-Fi, 802.11a/b/g/n/ac with Wi-Fi Direct support, BT5.0, BLE, aptX/aptX HD, USB Type C 3.1
- Data inputs: GPS/Glonass/BDS/Galileo/QZSS, accelerometer, gyroscope, compass, proximity sensor, barometer
- Water resistance: Mate 20 & Mate 20 X: IP53; Mate 20 Pro: IP68, up to 1.5 m (4.9 ft) for 30 minutes
- Codename: Hima (Mate 20); Laya (Mate 20 Pro); Everest (Mate 20 X)
- Website: mate 20 mate 20 pro

The Huawei Mate 20 is a line of Android phablets produced by Huawei, which collectively succeed the Mate 10 as part of the Huawei Mate series. The flagship models, the Mate 20 and Mate 20 Pro, were unveiled on 20 July 2018 at a press conference in London.

== Specifications ==
=== Hardware ===
The Mate 20 and Mate 20 Pro share a similar design, with a metal frame and glass back, and a patterned “Hyper Optical” finish in various colors, designed to improve grip and reduce fingerprint smudging. The Mate 20 Pro has IP68 certification. Both models utilise the Kirin 980 system-on-chip, an octa-core SoC featuring Cortex-A76 and Cortex-A55 CPU cores, Mali-G76 MP10 GPU, and a pair of AI accelerators. It was promoted as being the first commercially produced SoC utilizing a 7 nm production process. Both models feature USB-C connectors, while the Mate 20 Pro does not include a headphone jack. The device features front stereo speakers with Dolby Atmos support.

The Nano Memory compared with a Nano SIM card

The Mate 20 uses a 6.53 in (166 mm) 18.7:9 1080p LCD, while the Mate 20 Pro uses a 6.39 in (162 mm) 19.5:9 1440p display with curved edges. Both displays contain notches, with the Mate 20 featuring a “teardrop” shape, and the Mate 20 Pro containing a larger tab concealing additional infrared sensors used for a face recognition system. The Mate 20 Pro includes an optical in-screen fingerprint reader. The Mate 20 uses a physical fingerprint sensor on the rear below the cameras instead. Mate 20 Pro supports Qi inductive charging, including “reverse” charging of other Qi-compatible devices from its own battery. For storage expansion, the Mate 20 utilises a new, proprietary memory card format known as Nano Memory rather than MicroSD, which exactly matches the dimensions of a Nano-SIM card. As such, the devices utilize a hybrid SIM tray, where the second slot can be used for either expanded storage or a second SIM card.

The Mate 20 features three rear-facing cameras with Leica optics in a square-shaped array, with the Mate 20 Pro using 40-megapixel wide-angle IMX600, 20 MP ultra-wide angle, and 8-megapixel telephoto sensors, and the Mate 20 using 12 MP, 16 MP ultra-wide angle, and 8-megapixel telephoto sensors. Unlike previous Huawei phones, it does not include a monochrome lens for contrast adjustment and greyscale images, with the company citing improvements to the color sensors as making it redundant. This is accompanied by improvements to Huawei's artificial intelligence object recognition system, which can now distinguish between multiple types of subjects in a scene to selectively apply enhancements (rather than only applying one to the entire photo) and can recognize 1,500 possible scenarios (a three-fold increase over the P20's similar system). The camera software also features new “AI Cinema” effects modes. Both devices feature 24-megapixel front-facing cameras.

=== Software ===
The Mate 20 ships with Android 9.0 “Pie”. It introduces Huawei's EMUI 9 software suite, which is designed to be more streamlined than previous iterations. It includes new features such as screen gesture-based navigation, Digital Balance (a dashboard for tracking and limiting device usage), HiVision (an augmented reality object recognition experience for the camera), and Password Vault among other features.

The Mate 20 was upgraded to Android 10 featuring EMUI 10.

== Model variations ==
=== Porsche Design ===
The Porsche Design Huawei Mate 20 RS is a special edition of the Mate 20 Pro; its rear cover has a racing stripe motif with two stripes of leather, while it features 256 or 512 GB of storage, and 8 GB of RAM.

=== Mate 20 X and Mate 20 X 5G ===
The Mate 20 X is a larger variant of the Mate 20, featuring a 7.2-inch display, a headphone jack, a 5,000 mAh battery, vapour chamber cooling and support for an optional stylus. It features the same camera setup as the Mate 20 Pro, but lacks wireless charging. Unlike the Mate 20 Pro, its display is flat, and it uses a rear-mounted fingerprint reader. The phone is using graphene film cooling technology for thermal management, and is one of the first commercial products to utilise graphene for such purposes. A 5G variant was announced on May 17, 2019. It is nearly identical to the original Mate 20 X, but has a smaller 4,200 mAh battery and support for 40W fast charging. It lacks a headphone jack and a second stereo speaker.

=== Mate 20 Lite ===
The Mate 20 Lite was unveiled in August 2018, prior to the announcement of the flagship Mate 20 models. It is a mid-range phablet with a Kirin 710 system-on-chip with 4 GB of RAM, a 6.3-inch 1080p display, 3750 mAh battery, and 64 GB of storage expandable via MicroSD. It includes a 20-megapixel rear-facing camera and 24-megapixel front-facing camera, both accompanied by a secondary sensor for depth sensing. Furthermore, it shipped with Android 8.1 “Oreo” and EMUI 8.2.

== Reception ==
Vlad Savov of The Verge felt that the Mate 20 Pro “[wasn't] the best overall Android smartphone”, but argued that its specifications “[checked] off every wishlist item you can think of”, and cited standout features such as its extensive battery life, and “iPhone-like” responsiveness (whilst also noting Huawei's frequent use of user interface elements strongly influenced by iOS). Its display was considered comparable to Samsung's Galaxy Note 9, but felt that the symmetry of its front and rear curves affected ergonomics. The cameras were noted as having similar quality to the P20 Pro and a macro mode, but the removal of the monochrome sensor was lamented, and the cameras were panned for overly aggressive AI enhancements and a sometimes “crunchy” appearance due to excessive sharpness. The 3D face unlock was praised for its speed, contrasting the in-screen fingerprint reader (which did not have the same performance as the capacitive sensor on the P20), while the pre-release EMUI 9 software on the review device was noted to be buggy (but that its gesture implementation made more sense than the similar one implemented on Android 9 itself). In conclusion, Savov considered the Mate 20 Pro to be “a hugely indulgent purchase for those who are (a) outside the US, and (b) absolutely convinced they need its extensive list of good features and desirable specs.”

CNET was similarly positive, noting that the Mate 20 Pro “not only has a spec list that's the equal of any flagship phone out there, but it comes with enough new features to make it a truly exciting phone”, and was less aggressive in its use of color saturation on photos than the P20 Pro, but panned Huawei's switch to a proprietary memory card format due to pricing and availability not having yet been announced.

Some users noted that Mate 20 Pro devices with LG-manufactured displays had light bleed issues, with green tints appearing around the edges of the screen that were noticeable when displaying dark-coloured screens.

== See also ==
- List of Huawei phones
