= NearLink =

Wireless communications protocol

- NearLink logo
- Developed by: NearLink Alliance
- Introduced: 4 November 2022; 3 years ago
- Industry: Personal area networks
- Compatible hardware: Smartphones; Personal computers Audio devices Embedded devices Internet of things Internet of vehicles
- Website: http://www.sparklink.org.cn/

NearLink (Chinese: 星闪; also known as SparkLink and formerly Greentooth) is a short-range Wireless technology protocol, which was developed by the NearLink Alliance, led by Huawei to set up on September 22, 2020. As of September 2023, the Alliance has more than 300 enterprises and institutions on board, which include automotive manufacturers, chip and module manufacturers, application developers, ICT companies, and research institutions.

On November 4, 2022, the Alliance released the SparkLink Short-range Wireless Communications Standard 1.0, which incorporates two modes of access, namely, SparkLink Low Energy (SLE) and SparkLink Basic (SLB), to integrate the features of traditional wireless technologies, such as Bluetooth and Wi-Fi, with enhanced prerequisites for latency, power consumption, coverage, and security.

The Alliance unveiled the Standard 2.0 on March 30, 2024, which enhances end-to-end protocol system and extends application standards, supporting native audio and video capabilities, human-computer interaction, and positioning applications.

NearLink employs the Cyclic Prefix-Orthogonal Frequency Division Multiplexing (Cyclic Prefix-OFDM) waveform to address latency issues in various applications. The waveform features an ultra-short frame structure and a flexible scheduling scheme of time-domain resources, reducing transmission latency to approximately 20 microseconds. In addition, NearLink applies polar codes and adopts Hybrid Automatic Repeat-reQuest (HARQ) schemes to support applications with high reliability requirements, such as industrial closed-loop control applications for automated assembly lines, where reliability requirements are at least 99.999%.

The first product to feature NearLink technology was the Huawei Mate 60 series smartphone introduced by Huawei on August 29, 2023, followed by FreeBuds Pro 3 on November 25, 2023, M-Pencil 3rd gen with the MatePad 13.2 tablet on 14 December 2023, and the Pura 70 series on April 18, 2024. As of April 2026, over 100 million NearLink integrated circuit chips have been shipped.

== History ==
On September 22, 2020, the SparkLight Alliance was established to formulate the NearLink short-range wireless technology standard.

By the end of 2021, the NearLink 1.0 standards were finalized, establishing a core end-to-end architecture that includes the NearLink access layer, basic service layer, and basic application layer.

On November 4, 2022, the SparkLink Alliance officially released the SparkLink Short-range Wireless Communications Standard 1.0, which covers two modes of access: SLB (SparkLink Basic) and SLE (SparkLink Low Energy). They also unveiled "The White Paper for Promotion of SparkLink Short-Range Wireless Communication (SparkLink 1.0) for Industrial Use."

On August 4, 2023, Huawei officially unveiled the NearLink short-range wireless communication technology at the Developer Conference, providing a new wireless communication method for HarmonyOS.

On August 29, 2023, Huawei released the Huawei Mate 60 series smartphones, which are equipped with NearLink technology.

On September 25, 2023, at Huawei's Autumn Full-Scenario New Products Launch event, a new range of products supporting NearLink technology were unveiled. These products include the Huawei MatePad Pro 13.2-inch tablet, the third-generation M-Pencil stylus, and the FreeBuds Pro 3 earbuds.

On March 30, 2024, the Intelligent Car Connectivity Industry Ecosystem Alliance ("ICCE Alliance") and the NearLink Alliance jointly released the ICCE Alliance Digital Key System Part 6: NearLink System Requirements during the 2024 International NearLink Alliance Industry Summit". The Requirements were formulated by various parties including Huawei, BYD, Changan, GAC, FAW, etc.

On November 12, 2024, Huawei released a beta version of HarmonyOS 5.0.1(13) of HarmonyOS 5 targeted for developers that has full support of native NearLink Kit API integration of the operating system for third party applications support.

== System structure ==
The system structure of NearLink technology mainly consists of three layers: the physical layer, the data link layer, and the network layer.

1. Physical Layer: the core layer of NearLink technology, primarily responsible for the transmission and reception of high-frequency signals. The physical layer uses GFSK modulation and PSK modulation of different orders. In addition the physical layer has forward error correction (FEC) based on Polar codes.
2. Data Link Layer: primarily responsible for packaging and unpacking data, as well as data validation and error correction.
3. Network Layer: mainly responsible for data routing and forwarding, ensuring that data is correctly transmitted to its intended destination.

== Access modes ==
NearLink incorporates two access modes, namely SparkLink Low Energy ("SLE") (Note: "SparkLink Low Energy" also referred to as "Smart Link Enhanced" (SLE).) and SparkLink Basic ("SLB"). (Note: "SparkLink Basic" also referred to as "Multi Link Enhanced" (MLE).)

- The SLE mode is mainly aimed at low-power, low-latency, and high-reliability application scenarios, such as wireless headsets, mice, car keys, etc. It reportedly offers a data transmission rate of up to 12 Mbit/s, or six times that of Bluetooth, and supports bidirectional latency of 250 microseconds, simultaneous access by 256 users, and a power consumption of less than 2mA.
- The SLB mode focuses on high-speed, high-capacity, and high-precision application scenarios, such as video transmission, large file sharing, and precise positioning. It reportedly provides a data transmission rate of up to 1.2 Gbit/s, or twice that of Wi-Fi, and supports latency of 20 microseconds and simultaneous access by 4096 users.

== Modules ==
NearLink Module H383U	NearLink Module H383S
Dimensions
12.00mm X 12.00mm X 2.2mm	12.20mm X 13.00mm X 1.8mm
Protocols
Supports 802.11b/g/n/ax, Bluetooth Low Energy (BLE), NearLink, USB communication interface, coexistence of WiFi and BLE, as well as coexistence of WiFi and NearLink.	Supports 802.11b/g/n/ax, Bluetooth Low Energy (BLE), NearLink, SDIO communication interface, coexistence of WiFi and BLE, as well as coexistence of WiFi and NearLink.

== See also ==
- Bluetooth
- Wi-Fi
- Ultra-wideband
- LoRa
- NB-IoT
- ZigBee
- HarmonyOS
- Huawei Mate 60 Series
