= MindSpore =

Machine learning software library

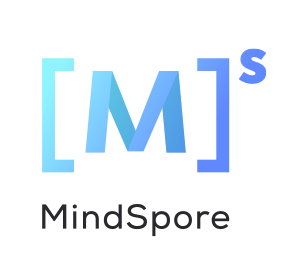
- Developer: Huawei
- Release: March 31, 2020; 6 years ago
- Stable release: 2.3.RC1 April 24, 2024; 2 years ago
- Written in: C++, Rust, Julia, Python, ArkTS, Cangjie, Java (Lite)
- Platform: Linux, Microsoft Windows, macOS, EulerOS, openEuler, OpenHarmony, Oniro OS, HarmonyOS, Android
- Type: Machine learning library
- License: Apache License 2.0
- Website: www.mindspore.cn/en
- Repository: gitee.com/mindspore/mindspore

MindSpore is an open-source software framework for deep learning, machine learning and artificial intelligence developed by Huawei.

== Overview ==
MindSpore provides support for Python by allowing users to define models, control flow, and custom operators using native Python syntax. Unlike graph-based frameworks that require users to learn DSL or complex APIs, MindSpore adopts a source-to-source (S2S) automatic differentiation approach, allowing Python code to be automatically transformed into optimized computational graphs.

It has support for custom OpenHarmony-based HarmonyOS NEXT single core framework system built for HarmonyOS, includes an AI system stack that comes with Huawei's built LLM model called PanGu-Σ with full MindSpore framework support. Alongside, OpenHarmony Native device-side AI support for training interface and ArkTS programming interface for its NNRt (Neural Network Runtime) backend configurations via MindSpore Lite AI framework codebase introduced in API 11 Beta 1 of OpenHarmony 4.1. MindSpore platform runs on Ascend AI chips and Kirin alongside other HiSilicon NPU chips.

CANN (Compute Architecture of Neural Networks), heterogeneous computing architecture for AI developed by Huawei. With CANN backend in OpenCV DNN, giving developers ability to run created AI models on the Ascend, Kirin and other HiSilicon NPU enabled chips.

It supports cross platform development such as Android, iOS, Windows, global OpenHarmony-based distro, Eclipse Oniro, Linux-based EulerOS alongside OpenEuler Huawei's server OS platforms, macOS and Linux.

== History ==
On April 24, 2024, Huawei's MindSpore 2.3.RC1 was released to open source community with Foundation Model Training, Full-Stack Upgrade of Foundation Model Inference, Static Graph Optimization, IT Features and new MindSpore Elec MT (MindSpore-powered magnetotelluric) Intelligent Inversion Model.

== See also ==
- Comparison of deep learning software
- Comparison of machine learning software
- Differentiable programming
- TensorFlow
- Keras
- CUDA

== Bibliography ==
- Huawei MindSpore AI Development Framework (1st (Online) ed.). Springer, Singapore. October 22, 2022. pp. 137–162. ISBN 978-981-19-2879-6.
- Deep Learning and Mindspore Practice (Huawei Intelligent Computing Technology Series)(Chinese Edition) (1st ed.). Tsinghua University Press. March 1, 2020. p. 355. ISBN 978-7302546610.
