= HarmonyOS 5 =

Distributed operating system

- Developer: Huawei
- Written in: C, C++, JavaScript, ArkTS, Cangjie, Rust, Assembly language and others
- OS family: OpenHarmony-based
- Working state: Current
- Source model: Closed, with open source components
- Initial release: 4 August 2023; 3 years ago
- Latest release: 6.1.0.135 / 20 July 2026; 43 days ago
- Update method: Over-the-air
- Package manager: .app
- Supported platforms: ARM64
- Kernel type: Microkernel (HongMeng Kernel)
- Userland: System Service Layer (OpenHarmony-based HarmonyOS system
- Default user interface: Harmony Design (Design System) (multi-touch, GUI)
- License: Commercial software, Proprietary software except for open-source components
- Preceded by: HarmonyOS 4.2 mobile/4.5 (TV) AOSP & Linux
- Succeeded by: HarmonyOS 6
- Official website: consumer.huawei.com/cn/harmonyos-next

Support status
- Supported

Articles in the series

HarmonyOS 5 (also known as HarmonyOS NEXT) is a proprietary distributed operating system developed by Huawei that succeeded the similarly named HarmonyOS, with the main difference being that the "NEXT" operating system supports only HarmonyOS native apps. Unlike Android-based HarmonyOS versions 1 to 4 (2019–2024) and the global EMUI operating system, the Next version (first launched on the Pura X) does not include the Android AOSP core and is incompatible with Android applications.

HarmonyOS NEXT both discards the common Unix-like Linux kernel and replaces the previous multiple-kernels system with its own bespoke HarmonyOS microkernel. The rich execution environment (REE) version of the HongMeng Kernel is placed at its core. The OpenHarmony-based operating system shares lineage with the lightweight LiteOS real-time operating system for resource-constrained devices like smart wearables and IoT products.

== History ==
On August 4, 2023, at Huawei Developers Conference 2023 (HDC), Huawei officially announced HarmonyOS NEXT, the next version of HarmonyOS, which supports only native APP apps via Ark Compiler and native APIs in the HarmonyOS SDK. The kernel of HarmonyOS NEXT no longer includes the compatibility layer of AOSP framework with Android libraries from EMUI in the user space and cannot run Android apk apps natively, as was the case with the initial dual-framework HarmonyOS.

The first internal preview version of the system was revealed on August 4, 2023, and the first preview version was released to registered public developers on January 18, 2024. The first devices tested with the developer preview version were the Mate 60, Mate 60 Pro and Mate X5 phones.

On 22 October 2024, HarmonyOS 5 was officially launched as the "HarmonyOS NEXT 5" brand, after the public beta was released on 8 October 2024. The first device to feature HarmonyOS NEXT at sale was the Huawei Mate 70, which went on sale in China in November 2024. By installing the all-new operating system on a newly launched device, Huawei created a new competitor to Android and iOS. Future Huawei devices are to be sold mainly with HarmonyOS NEXT, creating a third player in the market for smartphone operating systems worldwide. On May 8, 2025, a HarmonyOS computer running the HarmonyOS 5 operating system made its debut in Shenzhen, following the expiration of Huawei's Microsoft Windows licence in March.

== Features ==
=== Interface ===
HarmonyOS NEXT uses a direct manipulation interface. The main interface is the multi-touch touchscreen. , external peripherals such as mice, microphones, headphones, and keyboards can be connected via bluetooth or the USB-C charging port.

=== Applications ===
HarmonyOS NEXT devices come with preinstalled applications. Apps can also be downloaded through the Huawei App Gallery. As of September 2024, there were more than 10,000 native apps. This number increased to more than 20,000 on the app store as of January 2025. As of November 2025, the number of HarmonyOS Next apps and meta services reached over 300,000. Unlike previous versions of HarmonyOS, Android applications are no longer compatible and cannot be downloaded from the store. Large numbers of western apps are therefore not available natively. Yet, applications such as Easy Abroad and DroiTong do allow Android apps to run in emulation inside a separate container. Apps downloaded via DroiTong are automatically placed into a dedicated folder on the home screen. This includes leading apps such as Amazon, ChatGPT, Facebook, Netflix, YouTube. While these apps work, there are issues present with missed notifications, lower resolution, and file transfers in and out of the container. Apps not present include major banking apps, most streaming services, alternative mapping solutions such as Waze as well as some Google services such as Google Assistant and Gemini. Most major Chinese apps are also available, but most Chinese games are still missing.

Status of major Android apps in HarmonyOS Next
Available natively	Available in container	Not available	Sources
Alipay; AutoNavi (Gaode Map); Celia; DingTalk; Ele.me; Genshin Impact; iQIYI; JD.com; Lark; Meituan; Microsoft SwiftKey; NBA; QQ Music; QQ Reading; TikTok (Douyin); RedNote (Xiaohongshu); Taobao; WeChat (Weixin); Weibo; WPS Office	Airbnb; Amazon; ChatGPT; Deliveroo; Discord; Disney+; Doordash; Dropbox; Facebook; Gmail; Google Chrome; Google Docs; Google Drive; Google Maps; Google Search; Google Sheets; Instagram; Just Eat; Messenger; Netflix; Reddit; Signal; Spotify; Starbucks; Steam; Telegram; Uber; Uber Eats; WhatsApp; WhatsApp Business; X (Twitter); YouTube	Amazon Prime Video; Apple TV+; Bank of America; BankID; BNP Paribas; Chase; Citi; Crédit Agricole; Discovery+; ESPN+; Gemini; Google Assistant; HBO Max; HSBC; Hulu; MGM+; JioHotstar; Mitsubishi UFJ; Paramount+; Peacock; SMBC; Waze	

=== Storage ===
Devices running HarmonyOS Next have storage ranging from 128GB and 1TB. The storage can be expanded in some devices using Huawei's proprietary Nano Memory.

== Devices ==
HarmonyOS NEXT is found almost exclusively on Huawei devices. The first phones with the OS preinstalled were the Mate 70 series and Mate X6. The latest phones to release with HarmonyOS NEXT were the Pura 80 series.

== Technology ==
=== HongMeng kernel ===
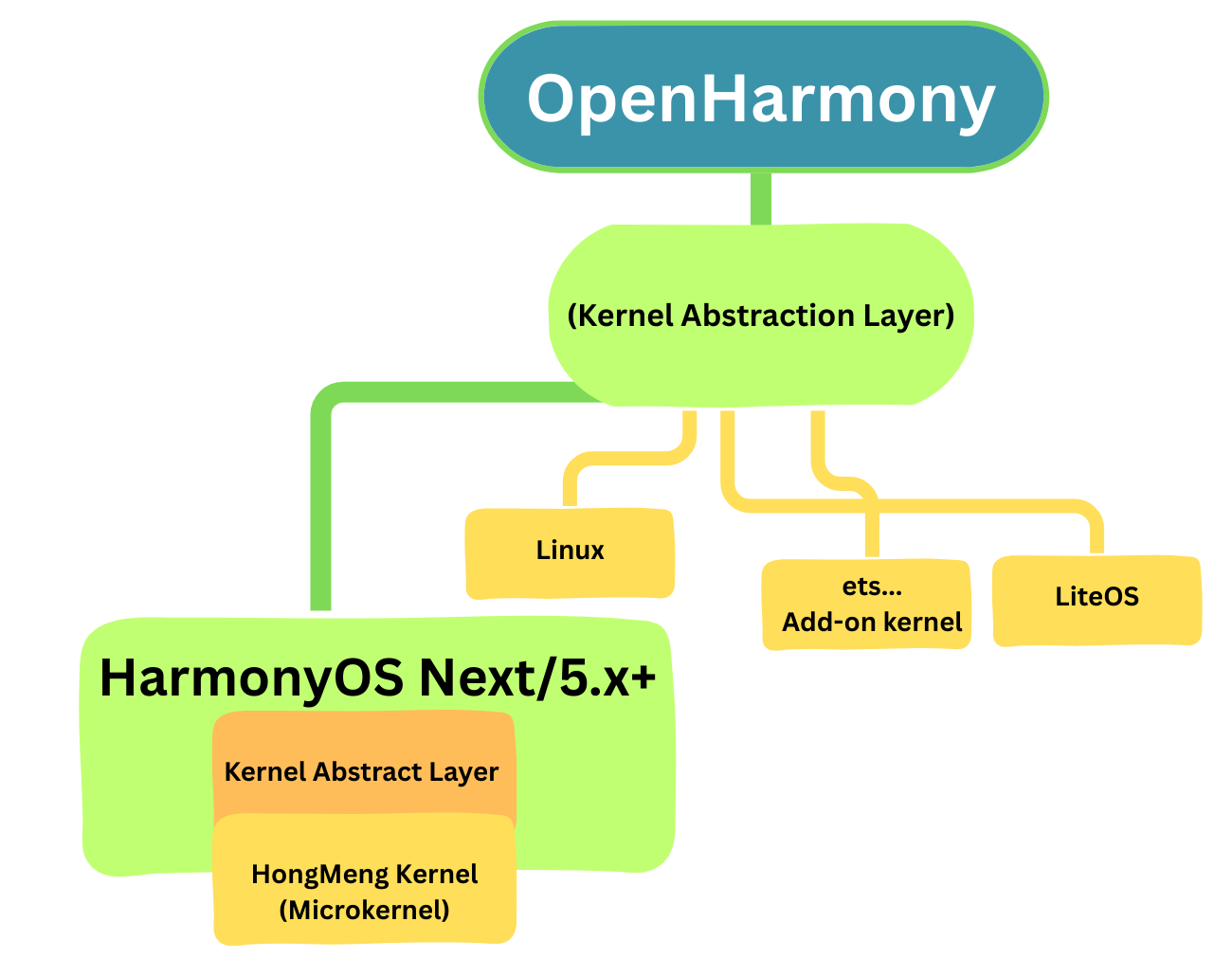
OpenHarmony-based HarmonyOS NEXT/5.x+ Architecture

The HongMeng Kernel, sometimes referred to as the Harmony kernel, is a computer operating system (OS) kernel developed by Huawei since August 2023. It is used in the HarmonyOS 5 version of the proprietary HarmonyOS distributed operating system, replacing previous versions that utilized the AOSP compatibility layer, the Linux kernel, and the LiteOS kernel.

The HongMeng Kernel utilizes a microkernel architecture, which aims to improve security and performance by isolating critical components of the system.

==== Kernel design ====
The HongMeng Kernel is a microkernel at rich executed environment level for software outside hardware-based HarmonyOS TEE kernel, called tee_OS, enabling greater modularity and larger portions of the OS to benefit from memory protection at kernel mode. HarmonyOS NEXT maintains the speed of a monolithic Linux kernel while incorporating a modular OpenHarmony system. It achieves compatibility through an abstraction layer that supports POSIX APIs and integrates musl-libc for advanced devices. This design allows HarmonyOS NEXT to efficiently handle critical tasks in user mode within its commercial distribution. The kernel has Linux ABI compatibility by placing an ABI-compatible shim in IC0 (kernel space) with support for OpenHarmony and AOSP complex framework hardware migration deployments, which redirects Linux system calls to IPC and serves as a central repository for global state. The kernel also reuses Linux drivers through driver containers, which balances between compatibility and critical path performance, while having control plane and data plane separation to improve performance. HongMeng kernel capabilities in context switching, network, application startup time, load, frame loss, interrupt latency, etc., and also performance optimised in smart routers and smart vehicles with real time capabilities functions.

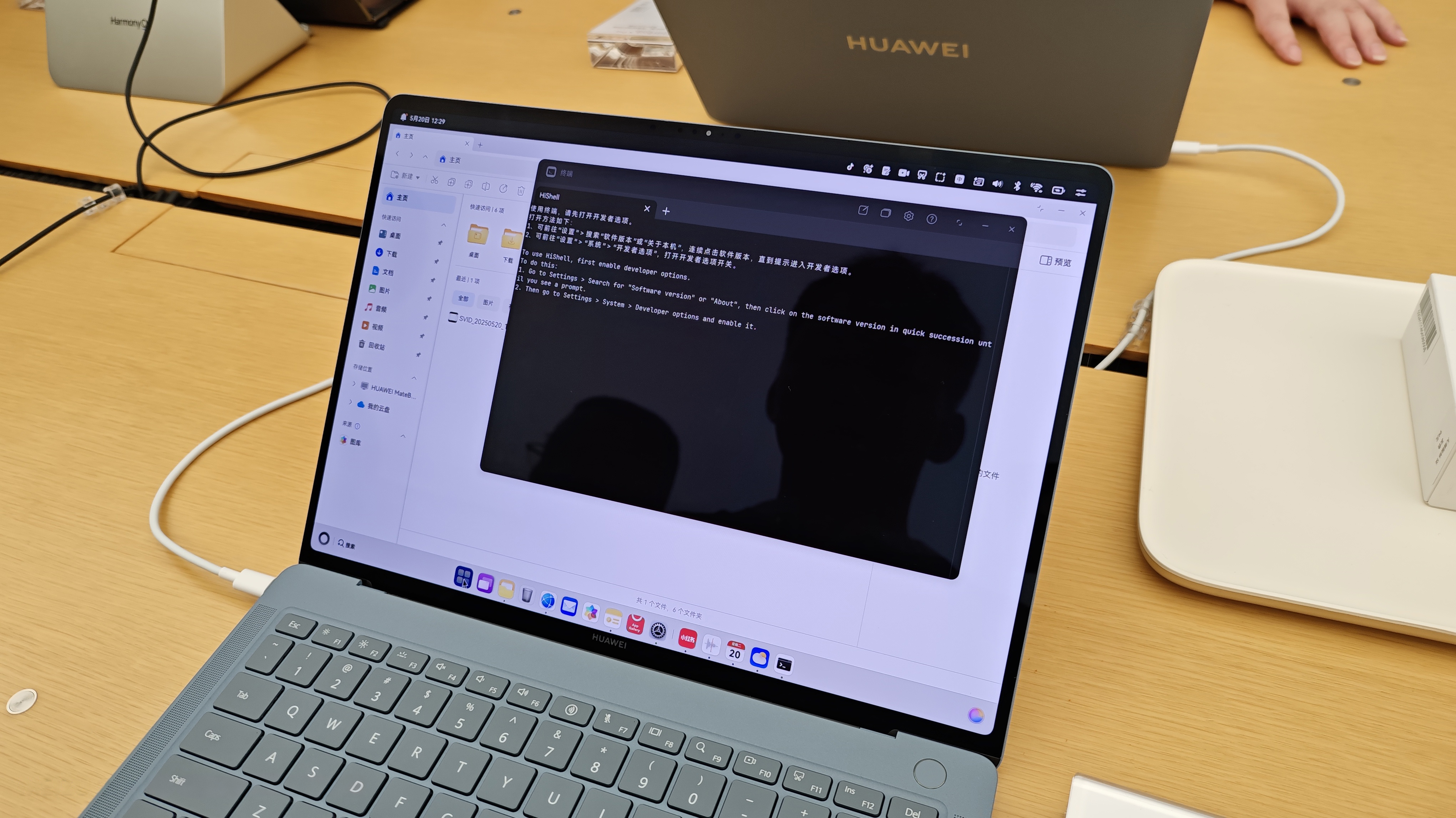
Terminal on HarmonyOS PC

As of November 25, 2025, HarmonyOS kernel runs on ARM64 devices on HarmonyOS 6.0.0.115 version with current version 1.11.10.

===== Kernel architecture =====
HarmonyOS NEXT is designed with a hybrid approach, combining the efficiency of a monolithic Linux kernel with modular elements from OpenHarmony. By utilizing a kernel abstraction layer, it ensures compatibility while maintaining performance optimization.

===== Compatibility Layer and libraries =====
The system integrates a POSIX-compliant compatibility layer, enabling smoother interoperability with third-party applications. Furthermore, musl-libc is incorporated to support more advanced devices, facilitating optimized performance for critical user-mode tasks.

===== Performance and use cases =====
This kernel design allows HarmonyOS NEXT to handle complex computational tasks effectively while remaining lightweight for various device categories. Its balance between modularity and speed ensures stable operations in both consumer electronics and industrial applications.

The kernel features Address tokens that connects the Access token manager that is an essential component in OpenHarmony-based distributed operating systems, responsible for unified app permission management based on access tokens. Access tokens serve as identifiers for apps, containing information such as app ID, user ID, app privilege level (APL), and app permissions. By default, apps can access limited system resources. ATM ensures controlled access to sensitive functionalities which combines both RBAC and CBAC models as a hybrid ACL model.

=== Software architecture and framework features ===
- Full-stack, self-developed HarmonyOS NEXT core operating system natively integrates the following components:
  - ArkUI / ArkUI-X: Native programming framework, including cross-platform support.
  - Ark Compiler, BiSheng Compiler and Ark Runtime: Built-in compilers and runtime environment
  - EROFS/HMDFS: Native distributed file system for storage and access.
- Native in-house Cangjie programming language alongside ArkTS as primary programming languages support for native HarmonyOS system and kernel
- Primary HarmonyOS native app file package, APP for HarmonyOS apps only
- Native Package management subsystem
- Refined and primary native in-house Ark Engine multimedia API graphics stack system that comes with ArkGraphics 2D and ArkGraphics 3D with Cangjie support across all devices with developer access
- Linux and LiteOS RTOS base on wearables, phones, tablets on System Service Layer replaced with self-developed Rich Execution Environment version of HarmonyOS kernel, Microkernel architecture.
- HarmonyOS NEXT SDK with previous classic HarmonyOS SDK API levels, alongside full standard OpenHarmony SDK development kit access support conglomerated in a complete and comprehensive in-house HarmonyOS SDK API 12, in a form of full development kit.
- Native Generative AI and Multimodal learning LLM Voice Assistant Celia/XiaoYi [China & Global] – Powered by Huawei Pangu AI model, supports Chinese and English with Celia Proactive Suggestions and Developers can add Celia Voice services to their atomic services improvements and applications.
- OpenHarmony versioning core baseline of HarmonyOS NEXT system versioning underlining the HarmonyOS operating system baseline versioning
- OpenHarmony user mode contains the kernel abstract layer that wraps the Linux syscall compatible layer via POSIX compatible, third-party musl from LiteOS lineage for HarmonyOS NEXT system kernel, in-house Microkernel.
- OpenHarmony Device Connector (HDC) native support, a command line tool for connecting and debugging HarmonyOS devices as well as OpenHarmony devices in interoperability, including self debugging on PC-side with native toolchain system. Replaces Android Debug Bridge on classic dual-framework OpenHarmony L3-L5 based EMUI and HarmonyOS AOSP userland base.
- Exclusive to in-house Kirin and HiSilicon chips optimisation and adaptation alongside selected Snapdragon legacy chips
- New visual graphical interfaces based on Neumorphism and Glassmorphism design language trend, visual elements on HarmonyOS Design language system for Spatial computing
- WebView component based on the ArkWeb software engine.
- Native HMS Core integration & push API
- New Permission application system with Capability-based security-like Rich Execution Environment kernel features, alongside native OpenHarmony-based Access token manager implements unified app permission management on Core File Kit, departure from previous versions of HarmonyOS with AOSP framework
- Advanced native multitasking and Task switching system
- Continuity of applications between devices via native Distributed Package Management Service (DBMS) from Distribution Service Kit API.
- Spatial computing support
- Native Spatial Audio support in Audio Kit API
- Harmony Intelligence backend stack embedded across the OS, with PanGu 5.0 LLM with Embedded variant, MindSpore AI framework with Neural Network Runtime API kit with smarter Celia virtual assistant.
- Collaboration between apps with the New distributed soft bus, App hop, Cross devices gallery
- Upgraded Desktop Mode for MatePad tablets and new Desktop PC systems for Matebook and MateStation PCs
- 30% performance boosts, 10.7% native custom HarmonyOS kernel performance boost compared former Linux kernel
- 5.5G connectivity support with existing 5G, 4G in native telephony stack of OpenHarmony-based HarmonyOS NEXT
- Bluetooth BLE 6.0 & NearLink 2.0 support

== Version history ==
HarmonyOS 5 releases
System version	OS version	Information	Release date
HarmonyOS NEXT (3.1) Developer Preview 1 [Internal Beta]	OpenHarmony 3.2	HarmonyOS NEXT Developer Preview version equipped with latest base technology, open capabilities, and development kits. The new version comes with HarmonyOS kernel (Microkernel). Huawei Ark graphics engine added. Phones and tablets are tested. Native HMS Core built inside. Internally released developer only software on OpenHarmony base development stack with API 9.	August 4, 2023
HarmonyOS NEXT (4.0) Developer Preview 1 [Internal Beta]	OpenHarmony 4.0	New graphical shells, including PC and tablet PC mode support with API 10.	October 26, 2023
HarmonyOS NEXT (4.1/4.1.1 – Canary Build) Developer Preview 1 [External Beta]	OpenHarmony 4.1	A large number of ArkTS APIs have been added, and the scope of distributed hardware support has been expanded. Improved new graphical shells. PC APIs added. HarmonyOS Kernel (Microkernel) retrofitted on Canary1 builds with API 11.	January 18, 2024
2.0.0.59 (SP3DEVCC00E59R4P1log – Canary Build 2)	OpenHarmony 4.1 beta 1	HarmonyOS NEXT Developer Preview 1 Beta rolled out on registered developers' handsets, Huawei Mate 60 Pro and other devices.	February 29, 2024
2.0.0.66 (SP3DEVCC00E59R4P1log – Canary Build 2)	OpenHarmony 4.1	External preview beta expansion of Developer Preview 2 rolled out on more registered developers' handsets with latest pre-release canary build.	April 2, 2024
3.0.0.22(Canary3)	OpenHarmony 5.0 beta 1	External beta expansion of Developer Beta 1 rolled out on more registered developers' handsets with latest pre-release developer Beta build with API 12.	May 25, 2024
NEXT.0.026(SP6DEVC00E29R4P6log) Developer Beta 1	5.0.0.25(Beta1)	HarmonyOS NEXT Developer Beta 1 with API 12, "Full scenario" intelligence OS with Harmony Intelligence rolled out publicly to all registered developers June 21, 2024 at HDC 2024 annual event in China.	June 21, 2024
NEXT.0.0.31 (SPXXXXXXXX) Developer Beta 2	5.0.0.33(Beta2)	HarmonyOS NEXT Developer Beta 2, expansion.	July 19, 2024
NEXT.0.0.35(SPXXXXXXXX) Developer Beta 3	OpenHarmony 5.0 beta 3	HarmonyOS NEXT Developer Beta 3 expansion.	August 2, 2024
NEXT.0.0.60(SP12DEVC00E6QR4P9) – Developer Beta 5	OpenHarmony 5.0 beta 5	HarmonyOS NEXT Developer Beta 5 bug fixes and the final fourth developer beta recruitment extended.	August 21, 2024
NEXT.0.0.65(SP3C00E65R1P6) – Beta 1 (Developer Beta 6)	5.0.0.60(Beta7 API 12 release)	HarmonyOS NEXT beta recruitment for developers and early adopters expanded to more devices. First rolled out on three main devices for developer testing with API 12 transitioning with Developer Beta 6.	August 30, 2024
NEXT.0.0.70	5.0.0.70 (API 12 Release)	On September 27, 2024, Huawei rolled out the last internal beta version patch NEXT.0.0.70 with EROFS support. On October 7, 2024, latest beta version patch NEXT.0.0.71 released alongside public beta launch on October 8 with 5.0.0 release beta soft launch by October 22, 2024.	September 27, 2024
NEXT.0.0.71(SP6C00E71R1P13) – Beta 1/Release	5.0.0.70 (API 12 Release)	HarmonyOS NEXT official consumer beta release for expanded models for single frame HarmonyOS 5.0 version with API 12. Starting with existing registered internal beta users of three models, Mate 60, Mate X5 and MatePad Pro 13.2 users.	October 8, 2024
NEXT.0.0.71(SP10C00E71R4P17) – Beta 2/Release	5.0.0.71 (API 12 Release)	HarmonyOS Next update with exFAT support and charging improvements, alongside other fixes.	October 13, 2024
NEXT.0.0.72 – Release	5.0.0.71 (API 12 Release)	Patch of changes introduced in the system ROM version updated on October 18 such as security control offset property setting and Media Library Kit improvements.	October 18, 2024
5.0.0.102(SP3C00E73R4P17)	5.0.0.102 (API 12 Release)	HarmonyOS NEXT 5 public beta rollouts commences.	October 22, 2024
5.0.0.102(SP3C00E73R4P17) – Release	5.0.0.102 (API 12 Release)	Release build launch	October 23, 2024
5.0.0.103 – Release (Beta)	5.0.0.103 (API 12 Release)	HarmonyOS NEXT 5 branded "public beta" release as HarmonyOS 5.0.0. Move to commercialisation for single-frame builds. Updated developer tools and documentations.	October 23, 2024
5.0.0.107 SP8	5.0 (API 12 Release)	Commercialisation of "HarmonyOS NEXT"; retrofitting on to the Galaxy Edition of the "HarmonyOS 5" name; HarmonyOS 5.0.1 installed on supported Huawei consumer flagship-devices on 26 November 2024; end of beta stage and move to "stable" for Chinese developers with API 12.	November 19, 2024
5.0.1.105 (SP11C00E105)	5.0.1 (API 12 Release)	5.0.1. update for Pura X foldable	March 30, 2025
5.1.0.110	5.1.0 (API 19)	New version for Huawei Pura 80 devices	June 11, 2025

== Reception ==
=== Market share ===
HarmonyOS NEXT is the third most popular mobile OS in the world at 5% market share as of quarter 1 of 2025.

=== Political significance ===
Pan Jiaofeng, president of the Institute of Science and Technology Strategy of the Chinese Academy of Sciences, stated in October 2024 that HarmonyOS NEXT had "achieved complete independent research and development across the entire chain and process, from the kernel to the database, programming language, and development environment." He highlighted the significant role of the operating system in the development of China's digital economy and digital transformation.

The Hong-Kong-based newspaper Ta Kung Pao commented in October 2024 that HarmonyOS NEXT had "essentially broken the United States' decades-long technological monopoly and demonstrated to the world China's unwavering commitment to the path of independent innovation."

=== Application ecosystem ===
HarmonyOS NEXT was opened for public testing in October 2024. While some applications exhibited smoother performance compared to previous versions, others experienced issues such as lag or crashes. Some application vendors advised users to exercise caution when upgrading.

Shanghai-based semiconductor analyst Li Tongyu noted at the launch that, although Huawei had secured adaptations from many developers, "most of these applications are demo versions with only basic core functionalities."

Zhu Yuezhong, an assistant professor at Southern Taiwan University of Science and Technology and an observer of Taiwan's semiconductor industry, remarked that, despite HarmonyOS moving away from Android's source code, at launch in October 2024 "the number of corresponding applications remains a concern."

The 21st Century Business Herald remarked in October 2024 that many niche or "long-tail" applications had yet to be migrated or adapted to the new system.

In August 2025, according to IT Times, HarmonyOS 5.1.0 version still has a gap in its app experience compared to Android and iOS. The HarmonyOS version of WeChat is missing nearly 30 features, such as the ability to share real-time location and recognize text in images. In addition, popular apps like Meituan and Bilibili also lack some functions, while some less common or enterprise-developed apps have issues with crashing and freezing. Furthermore, migrating from the Android version to the HarmonyOS version requires re-downloading the app and may result in incomplete data synchronization.

In October 2025, Sina's BUG column reports that social media users described experiencing "disastrous" issues following an upgrade, including disorganized icons, non-functional features in popular applications, and difficulties downgrading the system that resulted in data loss. Furthermore, they indicated that Huawei had not sufficiently informed users that the upgrade was an incompatible system replacement instead of a standard update. The column was advised by a Huawei consumer hotline engineer that certain groups, like video creators, "are temporarily not recommended to upgrade to HarmonyOS 5.1." The report also quoted a prior admission by Richard Yu that "user tolerance is a major issue."

=== Global expansion ===
In October 2024, analyst Zhuo Weian commented that, although Apple Inc. had set a precedent with its closed ecosystem, "HarmonyOS's similar model presents significant challenges for developers accustomed to the open Android ecosystem." He also noted that expanding HarmonyOS to the global market was considered difficult.

In contrast, the newspaper Ta Kung Pao opined in October 2024 that Huawei was "actively collaborating with global developers and partners, laying the groundwork for HarmonyOS's global expansion."

== See also ==
- EulerOS
- DevEco Studio
