= Huawei Mobile Services =

Proprietary software service

- HMS Core icon
- Creator: Huawei
- Website: Official website
- Launched: December 24, 2019; 6 years ago

Huawei Mobile Services (HMS) is a collection of proprietary services and high level application programming interfaces (APIs) developed by Huawei Technologies Co., Ltd. Its hub known as HMS Core serves as a toolkit for app development on Huawei devices. HMS is typically installed on Huawei devices on top of running HarmonyOS 4.x and earlier operating system on its earlier devices running the Android operating system with EMUI including devices already distributed with Google Mobile Services. Alongside, HMS Core Wear Engine for Android phones with lightweight based LiteOS wearable middleware app framework integration connectivity like notifications, status etc.

HMS consists of seven key services and the HMS Core. The key services are Huawei ID, Huawei Cloud, AppGallery, Themes, Huawei Video, Browser, and Assistant. The web browser is based on Chromium. Huawei Quick Apps is the alternative to Google Instant Apps.

By January 2020, over 50,000 apps had been integrated with HMS Core. Its rival, Google Mobile Services has 3 million apps on Google's Play Store. The AppGallery claimed 180 billion downloads in 2019.

In March 2020, HMS was used by 650 million monthly active users across 170 countries.

A Chinese phone manufacturer, LeTV, hosted a smartphone business communication meeting in Beijing on September 27, 2021, to demonstrate its phone, the LeTV S1. This was the first smartphone from a third-party manufacturer to include Huawei Mobile Services (HMS).

== HMS on Android and HarmonyOS ==
Huawei Mobile Services on Android goes all the way back to August 2016 as Huawei ID services for phones, basic functionalities for Huawei P9 series.

However, in May 2019 proved to be a significant change to HMS when Google was prohibited from working with Huawei on any new devices extending ecosystem for AppGallery store front launched in April 2018, year prior. This also included bundling Google's Apps, including Gmail, Maps and YouTube.

Any new Huawei devices launched after 16 May 2019 were unable to receive updates from Google services and would be considered 'uncertified' meaning Huawei's only solution at the time was to turn HMS into a genuine competitor to Google and incentivize app developers to utilize the platform.

Huawei officially launched Huawei Mobile Services in China on December 24, 2019, as a beta. Huawei expanded Huawei Mobile Services in Europe in February 2020 and other markets in Asia, Latin America, Middle East & Africa, Canada, Mexico followed outside banned US market.

HMS is available on the Honor 9X Pro, View 30 Pro, Huawei Mate XS. HMS is also available, alongside GMS, on many other Huawei models launched before the ban.

Huawei promised developers it would take, “less than 10 minutes", to port their app over to HMS - to illustrate the ease of portability between Google's Play Store and the HMS AppGallery.

On January 15, 2020, HMS Core 4.0 (Huawei Mobile Services Core 4.0) was officially launched. Huawei announced that at this time, there were already 1.3 million developers and 55,000 applications on board. The next day, Huawei held a developer day event in London and invested £20 million to encourage developers in the United Kingdom and Ireland to use HMS.

On July 15, 2021, Huawei expanded HMS with classic HarmonyOS dual-framework that provided Java support and eventually with JavaScript and ArkTS (eTS) language support with HMS Core 6.0 for app development with primarily Android apps, alongside limited HAP imperative developed based apps that shares AOSP file system libraries in all types of devices from smartphones, tablets, smart screens, smartwatches, and car machines. Including various third-party development frameworks, such as React Native, Cordova, etc.

At HDC 2023, Huawei unveiled HarmonyOS 5, marking a total break from the hybrid Android derived platform. This shift replaced the legacy Android and classic HarmonyOS-based HMS SDK with a full native API developer kit SDK built solely on OpenHarmony. The architecture moved from middleware services to vertical integration path. In this new model, HMS Core libraries are no longer external add-ons but are bundled directly into the system and DevEco Studio as native HarmonyOS Kits.

== HMS Core ==
HMS Core is a hub for Huawei Mobile Services and serves as a toolkit for app development on Huawei devices. The core comprises Development, Growth and Monetizing and was created as a replacement for Google Mobile Services (GMS) Core. HMS core services were available in more than 55,000 apps in June 2020; HMS Core 5.0 debuted in September 2020.

HMS Core 6.0 was launched in June 2021 with extended support for Huawei Cloud services. In June 2021, the number of registered developers within the HMS ecosystem was 4 million, and the number of apps integrated with the HMS Core had reached 134,000.

As of July 2022, registered developers within HMS ecosystem had grown to 5 million, and the number of apps integrated with the HMS Core reached 203,000. The number of apps had grown to 220,000 by 30 September 2022.

== AppGallery ==
The AppGallery has a key rival, Google's Play Store on Android. The AppGallery is available in 170 countries, across 78 languages.

== Reception ==
The reception of HMS is mixed, with the majority of discussion based around the key Google/Android apps which are not yet present on the AppGallery and whether or not this presents a significant problem to users. The open development of HMS Core has been regarded by some as benefiting the Android project as a whole, "If Huawei continues to invest in a holistically open approach ... the result could be that we could all end up a bit less beholden to Google".
