= Huawei ICT Competition =

International academic competition

The Huawei ICT Competition is an international academic competition and industry-university-research cooperation platform initiated by Huawei, aiming to cultivate global talents and promote innovative development. As of 2024, the project has cooperated with more than 500 international universities and benefited students from 140 countries and regions.

== Competition mechanics ==
The competition has a three-level competition mechanism consisting of regional qualifiers, national finals and global finals, involving technologies such as artificial intelligence, cloud computing, big data, data communications, the Internet of Things, Ascend, Kunpeng, Hongmeng, and OpenHarmony.
