= Huawei Member Center =

Chinese benefits app

Huawei Member Center is a benefits app which runs using Huawei Mobile Services. Originally launched in China, Huawei Member Center is now being developed primarily around devices such as P40 Pro and the Nova 7.

== Membership Levels ==
The Huawei Member Center provides rewards in two primary ways, 1) device-specific & promotions and 2) via frequent use of Huawei products and apps, using points to redeem additional benefits.

In China, Huawei members are already classified into three levels, the highest being “elite”. Membership level determines the level of perks received, from priority access to the service hotline, new device events & proprietary early-access opportunities.

Huawei ran a number of member events in 2019 called "Huawei Member Day" to promote the Member Center including providing tips for the Mate 30 Pro and offering a 50Gb cloud storage upgrade to users.

== HMC in China ==
Huawei Member Center Has seen significant adoption in China and the east, the rewards for use on the app have ranged from free book coupons, discounted travel and exclusive gifts of new devices, such as the Huawei Enjoy Z.
