= EulerOS =

Commercial Linux distribution

- Developer: Huawei Technologies, OpenAtom Foundation (openEuler)
- OS family: Linux (Unix-like), Unix (Compliant), HarmonyOS, OpenHarmony (openEuler Embedded (multi-kernel))
- Working state: Active
- Source model: Open-source
- Initial release: December 31, 2019; 6 years ago (EulerOS)
- Latest release: 25.09 / September 2025; 1 year ago
- Repository: atomgit.com/openeuler
- Marketing target: Servers, Cloud computing, Personal computers, Embedded devices, Edge computing, Industrial
- Supported platforms: AArch64 (TaiShan), LinxiISA (LinxCore) (Kunpeng), x86-64, 32-bit ARM, IA-32, RISC-V, and LoongArch
- Kernel type: Monolithic (Linux), multi-kernel (openEuler) with UniProton Microkernel RTOS
- Userland: GNU with UKUI, GNOME, Deepin, Kiran-desktop, and Xfce, POSIX, OpenHarmony, HarmonyOS (shared apps & FDE/CDE HiShell CLI)
- Influenced by: CentOS, HarmonyOS, OpenHarmony, LiteOS
- License: Apache License
- Official website: developer.huaweicloud.com/ict/en/site-euleros/euleros

EulerOS is a commercial Linux distribution developed by Huawei based on Red Hat Enterprise Linux to provide an operating system for server and cloud environments under Huawei Cloud B2B provider ecosystem. Its open-source community version is known as openEuler. The source code of openEuler was released by Huawei at Gitee in January 2020. openEuler became an open-source project operated by OpenAtom Foundation after Huawei donated the source code of openEuler to the foundation on 9 November 2021.

A new programming language, Cangjie, for EulerOS and HarmonyOS was announced in September 2021.

On March 27, 2020, openEuler 20.03 LTS version was released in the open source repo as the first Long Term Support (LTS) edition.

openEuler 21.09 version launched with a new file system called EulerFS, also a kernel upgrade that is organized similar to classic HarmonyOS and OpenHarmony multi-kernel architecture that carries both RTOS kernel and Linux kernel on October 1, 2021. Also, the operating system supports, UniProton RTOS kernel and kubeOS containerised OS.

EulerOS includes Apache HTTP Server which is known as Apache, as part of its supported tools on the platform.

Huawei announced at Operating System Conference & openEuler Summit 2025 on November 14, 2025, a major milestone for openEuler open source operating system, aimed to exceed 16 million installations by the end of 2025.

== KunLun Mission Critical Server ==
EulerOS 2.0, running on the Huawei KunLun Mission Critical Server, was certified in 2019 as conforming to the Single UNIX Specification (UNIX 03); however. the certification expired in September 2022.

EulerOS/KunLun allows replacing central processing unit board modules and memory modules without stopping the OS. Hot swapping of CPU and memory is provided by EulerOS.

== Code shared with HarmonyOS and OpenHarmony ==
EulerOS with openEuler shares technology with Huawei's mobile operating system, HarmonyOS including BiSheng Compiler, distributed DSoftBus technology, OpenHarmony distributed file system (HMDFS), EROFS read-only file system and native HAP file format. Huawei plans to unify additional components between both OSes.

== NestOS ==
In November 2021, NestOS, an operating system based on open source EulerOS was launched. It incorporates the features of EulerOS, enhancing its capabilities in the cloud to cater to specific needs. NestOS, while maintaining the EulerOS ecology, brings its own features for various applications.

In October 2022, the openEuler community updated the NestOS operating system to the new version based on the openEuler 22.09 version that includes enhanced features to the system with nestos-assembler container image, optimized Kubernetes, and improvements to its OpenStack system.

== openEuler Embedded ==
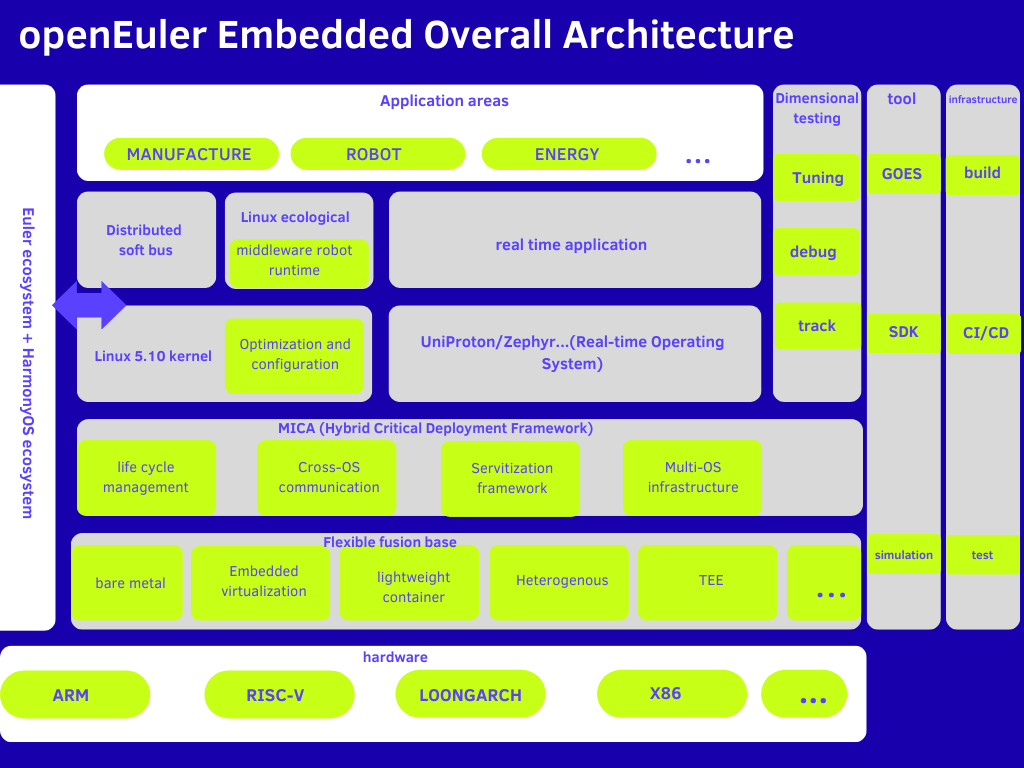
OpenEuler Embedded OS architecture

openEuler Embedded version was released in March 2022, an open source embedded OS variant of openEuler desktop server oriented operating system by OpenAtom Foundation which was introduced on version openEuler 22.03 LTS (Long Term Support) for embedded devices used in industrial scenarios for enterprise markets. The supported instruction sets and chips as of 2024, it supports X86, ARM, SW64, RISC-V, and LoongArch multiprocessor architectures, and PowerPC. It supports chips such as HiSilicon Industrial Chip Hi3093, Rockchip RK3568, SemiDrive D9 series, Raspberry Pi, x86, STM32F407ZGT6 with development boards from Horizon, Chinese Academy of Sciences RISC-V, Rockchip RK3588, Feiteng E2000.
