= OpenAtom Foundation =

Open-source software foundation

- Foundation logo
- Formation: June 15, 2020; 6 years ago
- Founders: Alibaba, Baidu, Huawei, Inspur, Qihoo 360, Tencent, China Merchants Bank, etc.
- Founded at: Beijing, China
- Type: Nonprofit
- Website: www.openatom.org

OpenAtom Foundation (Chinese: 开放原子开源基金会), is the first foundation for open-source software in China. It was established in June 2020 with the support of the Ministry of Industry and Information Technology and initiated jointly by Alibaba, Baidu, Huawei, Inspur, Qihoo 360, Tencent, China Merchants Bank and other companies for operation and marketing services of open source projects.

== Projects ==
As of December 2022, the foundation hosts open source projects including XuperCore (kernel of XuperChain blockchain architecture), OpenHarmony, openEuler, TencentOS Tiny, AliOS Things, OpenBlock, PIKA and hapjs.

== Collaboration ==
On September 28, 2021, the OpenAtom Foundation and the Eclipse Foundation announced their intention to form a partnership to collaborate on OpenHarmony.

On October 26 in the same year, both partners launched the Oniro operating system, a compatible implementation of OpenHarmony based on open source and aimed to be transparent, vendor-neutral, and independent system for the global market with the founding members including Huawei, Linaro and Seco, an Italian IoT device manufacturer.

On November 23, 2023, nearly two years after the launch of the Oniro operating system, OpenAtom and Eclipse Foundation signed a cooperation agreement for the development of the pan-European OpenHarmony-based distro project.

== Xiaoyuanxing ==
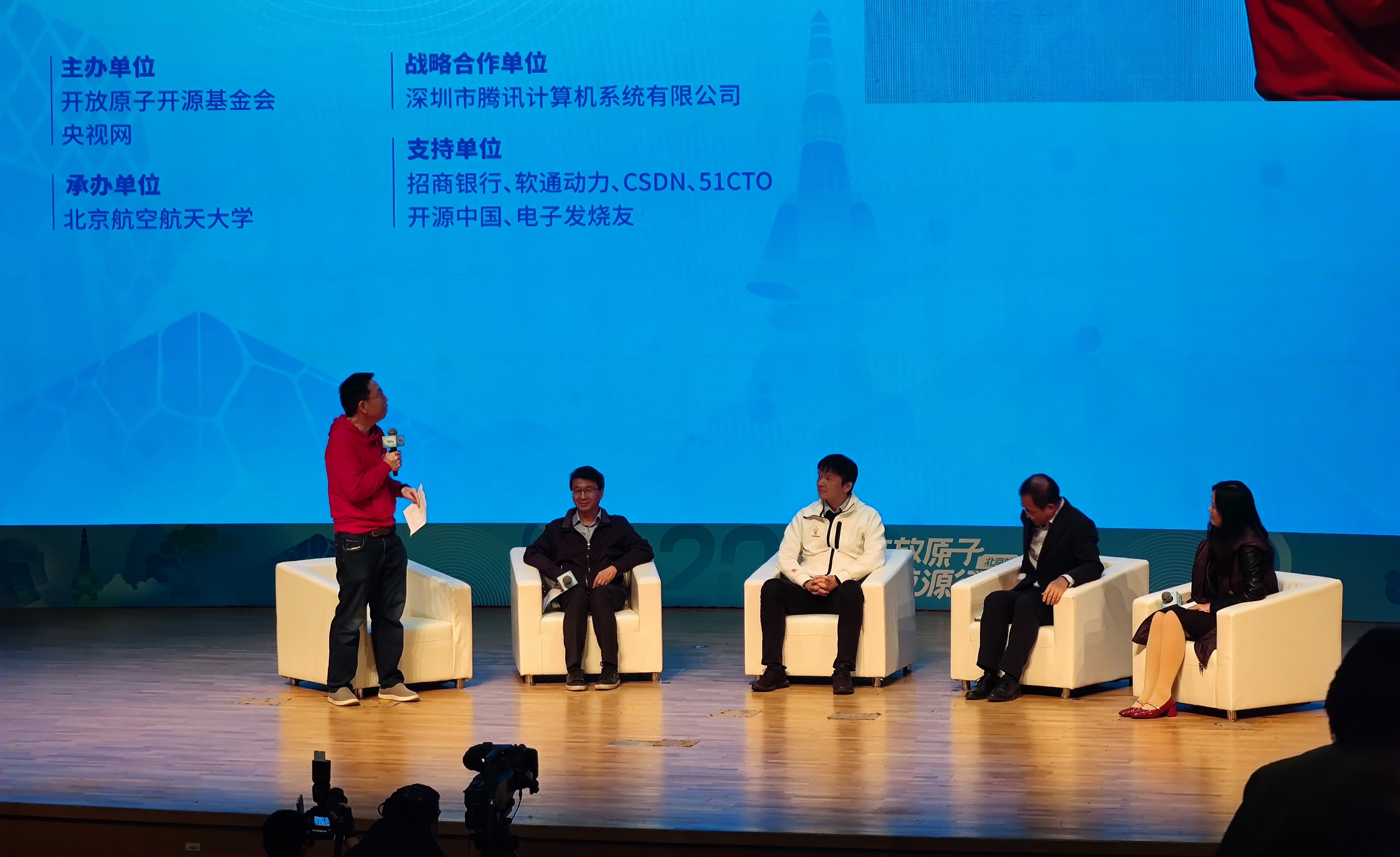
The first event of Xiaoyuanxing, Beihang University in April 2023

OpenAtom Xiaoyuanxing (Chinese: 开放原子校源行) is an initiative hosted by the OpenAtom Foundation to promote open-source culture within universities. Universities like the Beijing Institute of Technology have shown strong support for this initiative by establishing programs like the OpenHarmony Talent Class, and others setting up student societies like the OpenAtom Open Source Society and the OpenHarmony Technology Club.

== See also ==
- OpenHarmony
