= Huawei AppGallery =

Mobile app distribution platform

- Developer: Huawei Technologies Co., Ltd.
- Release: 2011; 15 years ago, in China; 2018; 8 years ago worldwide
- Platform: HarmonyOS, Android (open-source)
- Included with: Huawei and Honor devices
- Available in: Available in 80 languages
- Type: App store, Digital distribution, Mobile game store
- Website: appgallery.huawei.com

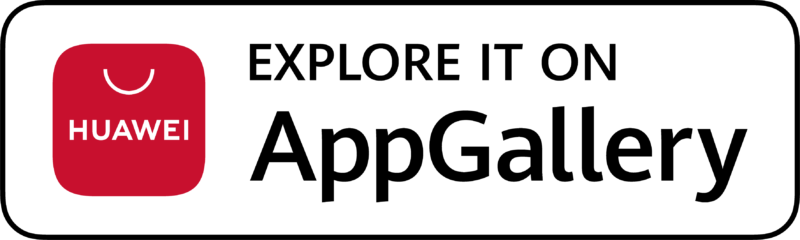
AppGallery badge with 'Explore it on AppGallery' text

Huawei AppGallery is a package manager and application distribution platform, or marketplace app store, developed by Huawei Technologies Co., Ltd. It serves as the official app store for the devices running on Huawei HarmonyOS, and is also available for Huawei EMUI and Microsoft Windows via the Mobile Engine emulator.

As of 2022, AppGallery had 580 million monthly active users.

== History ==
Huawei AppGallery was launched in 2011 in China and in 2018 internationally.

In May 2019, Huawei was added to the Entity List by the US Department of Commerce, effectively banning the company's software products from gaining access to Google Mobile Services (GMS), Google Play Store and other such applications. As a result, Huawei began releasing its new devices with its own AppGallery, in which the apps were programmed with its own proprietary Huawei Mobile Services (HMS).

On 9 August 2019, soon after the US ban, Huawei launched HarmonyOS, first on smart TVs for Honor Vision and Vision S. In 2019 there were 45,000 Android apps using HMS on AppGallery.

During the third quarter of 2020, AppGallery had reached 350 billion app downloads. In 2020, AppGallery had 490 million users in over 170 countries and regions, On 1 March 2021, AppGallery had over 530 million active users.

Then, on 2 June 2021, Huawei launched HarmonyOS 2.0 with AppGallery pre-installed on its own smartphones and tablets. About a week later, Huawei launched a separate HarmonyOS section on its AppGallery to recommend HarmonyOS apps and compatible Android apps. Apps specifically made for HarmonyOS carried a small "HMOS" badge in the right hand corner of the app icon.

On 27 July 2022, during the HarmonyOS 3 event, Huawei revealed that the HMS ecosystem had 5.4 million global developers, up from roughly 1.6 million developers in 2020. In October 2022, AppGallery had 580 million monthly active users.

On 18 January 2024, during HarmonyOS Ecosystem development event, Huawei's President of Device Cloud announced that the HarmonyOS NEXT software system marks the second stage of development for HarmonyOS. By the end of 2024, the company expects an additional 5,000 native apps to hit on HarmonyOS AppGallery and hopes to exceed 500,000 native apps for HarmonyOS in the near future.

On 7 March 2024, it was reported that more than 4,000 apps have joined the HarmonyOS ecosystem on native .APP format apps for pre-released HarmonyOS NEXT Galaxy Edition version system on the incoming HarmonyOS 5 version, since the end of the first quarter of 2024.

On 17 April 2024, it was reported more than 5,000 native HarmonyOS apps have been built for HarmonyOS NEXT at Huawei Analyst Summit 2024 after rotating chairman confirms HarmonyOS NEXT stable version release later in the year.

On 22 April 2024, it was reported that Huawei has 1,000 apps in negotiations, alongside its 5,000 apps in total that are scheduled to be updated by planned September launch announced at HarmonyOS Developer Day HDD 2024 on 17 May 2024.

On 21 June 2024, at HDC 2024 over 1,500 native apps have already completed the HarmonyOS NEXT-based version and are available on the AppGallery for China's initial market for developer beta testers and the native app development mark reached 5000 apps for the HarmonyOS platform.

On 19 September 2024, it has been reported by Huawei that more than 10,000 apps and meta-services launched on HarmonyOS Next before commercial release in Q4.

On 16 October 2024, it has been reported by Huawei that more than 13,000 apps and meta-services launched on HarmonyOS Next before commercial release on October 22nd 2024.

On 22 October 2024, it has been reported by Huawei at its official HarmonyOS NEXT 5 launch event that more than 15,000 apps launched on HarmonyOS platform.

On 13 January 2025, HarmonyOS Next applications reached 20,000 native apps and meta-services of mini apps on AppGallery in China region.

HarmonyOS Computer system debuted on 10 May 2025 with 150 PC native apps and 2000+ ecosystem universal compatible native apps with Huawei PC devices ecosystem. By September 2025, AppGallery grew to 8,000+ HarmonyOS PC apps. It has been revealed that 80% of the 1000 apps on the HarmonyOS platform have completed landscape screen transition.

On 20 June 2025 at HDC 2025 with HarmonyOS 6 Developer Beta debut, Huawei's consumer business group's chief operating officer Richard Yu announced that the HarmonyOS ecosystem, has over 30,000 native apps and meta-services.

On 19 November 2025, HarmonyOS computers app ecosystem has 10,000+ desktop PC available apps on AppGallery.

On 25 November 2025 Mate 80 series and Mate X7 event, it has been announced by Huawei that there are 300,000 HarmonyOS applications and Atomic-services (also-known as meta-services).

== Number of apps ==
In 2020, AppGallery had more than 96,000 apps and over 50,000 HMS-enabled apps. During Huawei's "Apps Up" event in 2021 the company announced that 134,000 apps were building on the Harmony platform (using Huawei Mobile Services). By October 2022, AppGallery had established itself as one of the world’s top app markets, with over 220,000 HMS-based Android apps.

As of 22 December 2025, it has been reported by Huawei that there are over 350,000 HarmonyOS applications and Atomic-services (also-known as meta-services) on AppGallery.

== See also ==
- App Store (Apple)
- List of Android app stores
- List of free and open-source software packages
- List of mobile app distribution platforms
