= LiteOS =

Real-time operating system from Huawei

- Developer: Huawei Technologies Co., Ltd.
- Written in: C, assembly language, Shell
- OS family: POSIX
- Working state: Discontinued
- Source model: Open source
- Initial release: 20 May 2015; 11 years ago
- Final release: V5.0 / December 2020; 5 years ago
- Repository: https://gitee.com/LiteOS
- Marketing target: Internet of things, smartwatches
- Available in: Chinese, English
- Kernel type: Real-time Microkernel
- License: BSD 3-clause
- Succeeded by: OpenHarmony
- Official website: "LiteOS: Huawei LiteOS". Gitee.com.

Huawei LiteOS is a discontinued lightweight real-time operating system (RTOS) developed by Huawei. It is a POSIX compliant operating system for Internet of things (IoT) devices, and free and open-source software, released under a BSD 3-clause license. Microcontrollers of different architectures such as ARM (M0/3/4/7, A7/17/53, ARM9/11), x86, and RISC-V are supported by the project. Huawei's LiteOS is part of their '1+8+N' Internet of things system, and has been featured in several open source software development kits and industry offerings.

Smartwatches by Huawei and its former Honor brand run LiteOS. LiteOS variants of kernels has since been incorporated currently into the IoT-oriented open source OpenHarmony kernel agnostic platform and classic HarmonyOS 4.x and earlier versions.

== History ==
On 20 May 2015, at the Huawei Network Conference, Huawei proposed the '1+2+1' Internet of Things solution and released the IoT operating system named Huawei LiteOS. It has been reported development of the real-time operating system goes back as far as 2012.

== Key features ==
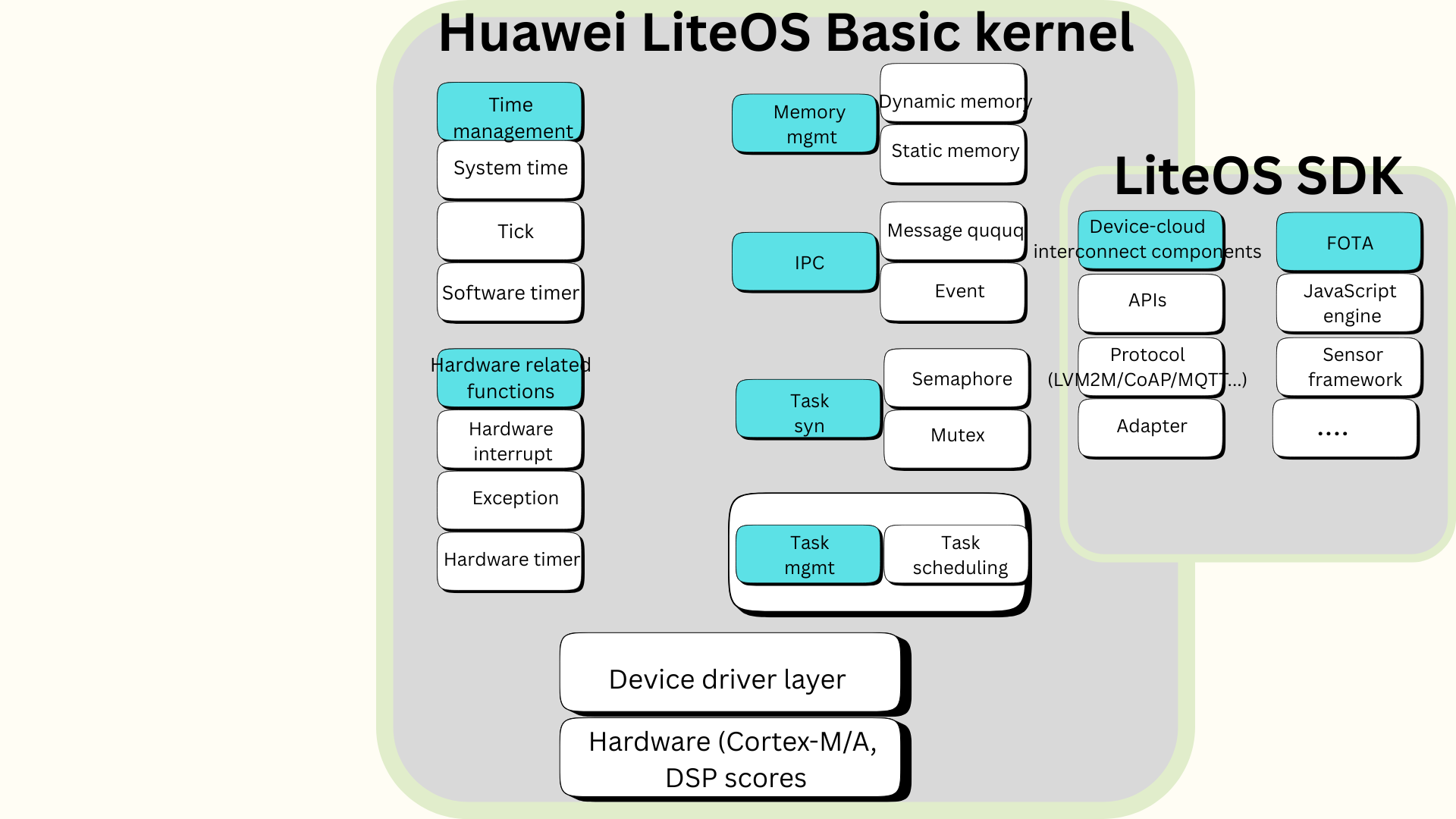
Huawei LiteOS architecture

- Lightweight, small kernel; <10 kilobytes (kB)
- Energy efficient
- Fast startup within milliseconds
- Support NB-IoT, Wi-Fi, Ethernet, BLE, Zigbee, and other different IoT protocols
- Support access to different cloud platforms

== Supported architectures ==
- ADI
  - ADuCM4050
- Atmel
  - Atmel SAM D21 Xplained Pro
  - ATSAM4S-XPRO
  - ARDUINO ZERO PRO
- GigaDevice
  - GD32F450I-EVAL
  - GD32F190R-EVAL
  - GD32F103C-EVAL
  - GD32F150R-EVAL
  - GD32F207C-EVAL
  - GD32VF103
- Huawei
  - Hi3518
  - Kirin A1
- MediaTek
  - LINKIT7687HDK
- Microchip
  - ATSAME70Q21
- MindMotion
  - MM32F103_MINI
  - MM32L373
  - MM32L073PF
- Nuvoton
- Nordic Semi
  - NRF52840-PDK
  - NRF52-DK
- NXP
  - LPC824_LITE
  - LPC54110_BOARD
  - FRDM-KW41Z
  - FRDM-KL25Z
- Silicon Labs
  - EFM32 Giant Gecko Starter Kit EFM32GG-STK3700
  - EFM32 Pearl Gecko Starter Kit SLSTK3401A
  - EFM32 Happy Gecko Starter Kit SLSTK3400A
- STMicroelectronics
  - STM32F411RE-NUCLEO
  - STM32F412ZG-NUCLEO
  - STM32F429I_DISCO
  - STM32L476RG_NUCLEO
  - STM32F746ZG_NUCLEO
  - STM32F103RB-NUCLEO
- TI
  - LAUNCHXL-CC3220SF

== See also ==
- Embedded operating system
- HarmonyOS
- OpenHarmony
- HarmonyOS NEXT
- WearOS
