= Heeks =

Heeks is a surname. Notable people with the surname include:

- Richard Heeks, British academic
- Willi Heeks (1922–1996), German racing driver

== See also ==
- Meeks
