= Huawei FreeBuds =

Wireless earbuds by Huawei

Huawei-FreeBuds
- Developer: Huawei
- Manufacturer: Luxshare
- Product family: Huawei FreeBuds
- Type: Wireless earbuds
- Released: 1st generation: March 27, 2018; 8 years ago; 2nd generation: March 20, 2019; 7 years ago; 3rd generation: June 6, 2021; 5 years ago; 4th generation: April 17, 2023; 3 years ago
- Discontinued: 1st generation: 2019
- System on a chip: 1st generation: Custom HiSilicon chip; 2nd and 3rd generation: Kirin A1; 4th generation: BES2700 chipset; Pro 3rd generation: Kirin A2
- Input: FreeBuds (each); Dual beam-forming microphones, dual optical sensors
- Connectivity: FreeBuds (each); Bluetooth, NearLink; Charging case USB-C port
- Current firmware: 1st gen: FreeBuds Firmware xxx (2019) 2nd gen: V1.9.0.612 (May 14, 2021); 3rd gen: 1.9.0.200 (July 13, 2021) 4th gen: HarmonyOS 4.0.0.178
- Dimensions: FreeBuds (each); 1.63 x 0.66 x 0.73 in (41.4 x 16.8 x 18.5 mm); Charging case 1.85 x 2.59 x 0.96 in (46.9 x 65.9 x 24.5 mm)
- Weight: FreeBuds (each); 0.14 ounces (4.0 g); Charging case 1.34 ounces (38 g)

Huawei FreeBuds are wireless Bluetooth and NearLink earbuds. They were first announced and released on March 27, 2018, alongside the Huawei P20 series. In addition to playing audio, the Huawei FreeBuds contain built-in microphones for noise cancellation, accelerometers, and optical sensors to detect wear status and gestures (e.g., double-tap to pause audio).

== History ==
=== Huawei FreeBuds 3 & 3i ===
In March 2019, Huawei released the second-generation FreeBuds, the FreeBuds 3, followed by the FreeBuds 3i in May 2020. These models feature the Kirin A1 chip, extended talk time, and noise-cancellation capabilities. Additionally, an optional wireless charging case, available at an extra cost, was introduced.

=== Huawei FreeBuds 4i & 4 ===
Huawei launched the third-generation FreeBuds 4i on June 6, 2021, followed by the mainline FreeBuds 4 in May 2021. These earbuds underwent an external redesign, featuring shorter stems akin to the FreeBuds Pro, spatial audio, IPX4 water resistance, and improved battery life.

=== Huawei FreeBuds 4E ===
Introduced in March 2022, the FreeBuds 4E joined the FreeBuds lineup, powered by HarmonyOS. They featured a new audio universal card exclusive to HarmonyOS smartphones, system notifications, a personalized pop-up menu, and the capability to list and detect songs in real-time. The FreeBuds 4E offer a 22-hour battery life without noise cancellation and 14 hours with noise cancellation enabled.

=== Huawei FreeBuds Lipstick ===
The special edition FreeBuds Lipstick, released on November 10, 2021, features a unique lipstick-shaped case. These earbuds include High-Resolution Sound, Air-Like Comfort, and Open-Fit Active Noise Cancellation 2.0. They also offer Intelligent Audio Connection, which enables the transfer of video from a phone to Huawei Vision and audio to the FreeBuds Lipstick with a simple tap. The earbuds support Smart Collaboration with Device+ on EMUI 12 for seamless device switching, gesture controls for music playback and calls, and up to 22 hours of music playback battery life with ANC off (14 hours with ANC on). The Huawei AI Life App allows users to manage noise cancellation and audio modes for the FreeBuds series.

=== Huawei FreeBuds 5 ===
The fourth-generation FreeBuds 5 series was available for pre-order in China in June 2022. The FreeBuds 5i were released in January 2023, followed by the global release of the FreeBuds 5 in April 2023. The FreeBuds 5 feature an open-fit design for enhanced comfort and noise cancellation, along with True Wireless Stereo (TWS). They are equipped with an ultra-magnetic dynamic driver to boost bass and support dual HD codecs with real-time audio enhancements across a broad frequency range. The earbuds offer 30 hours of battery life, Celia AI call noise cancellation for clearer voice communication, IP54 dust- and splash-resistance, and fast charging capabilities, all powered by HarmonyOS.

== FreeBuds Pro ==
=== Huawei FreeBuds Pro ===
The HUAWEI FreeBuds Pro line is a series of high-end true wireless earbuds. Improved sound quality, active noise cancellation, and long battery life. The FreeBuds Pro supports the L2HC 2.04 and LDAC codecs. The FreeBuds Pro line was first launched in September 2020. They were available around Europe starting from October 2020. This line of earbuds has been growing rapidly, with the FreeBuds Pro being the third pair of true wireless earbuds Huawei launched in the year prior to their release.

=== Huawei FreeBuds Pro 2 ===
The second-generation Pro line of FreeBuds, FreeBuds Pro 2 was released June 23, 2022. They are designed in collaboration with Devialet. One of the standout features is the Intelligent Active Noise Cancellation technology. This feature adapts to the environment, helping to block out unwanted noise during calls and listening to audio. The earbuds also boast an Ultra-Hearing Dual-Speaker system for clear sounds. This, combined with the Triple Adaptive EQ included for balance. In addition, the FreeBuds Pro 2 are certified by HWA and Hi-Res Audio Wireless. The limited battery life with Active Noise Cancellation turned on gives users 4 hours of listening time. The charging case provides an additional 18 hours of battery life.

=== Huawei FreeBuds Pro 2+ ===
The second-generation Huawei FreeBuds Pro 2+ with TWS like FreeBuds 5 is an interative version of the FreeBuds Pro 2. It support LDAC™ high-resolution codec, and are certified both by HWA and Hi-Res Audio Wireless, with a transmission of up to 990 kbit/s. They employ a bone conduction microphone and three additional microphones that all use Huawei's-exclusive deep neural network (DNN) noise cancellation algorithm. The intelligent dynamic ANC 2.0 will switch the earbuds to optimal noise cancellation mode in real time thanks to its ability to detect the ear canal structure, wearing status, and environmental noise. FreeBuds Pro 2+ were released on April 9, 2023. Global availability was also announced on the same day.

=== Huawei FreeBuds Pro 3 ===
FreeBuds Pro 3, the third-generation of the Pro line was released on November 25, 2023, that features new Kirin A2 chipset and NearLink technology which achieves 1.5 Mbit/s lossless audio transmission and ultra CD-level lossless sound quality. Compared with traditional Bluetooth headsets, NearLink not only supports faster connection but also leads to better stability with stronger anti-interference. The earbuds are equipped with a Hi-Res Dual Driver Sound System that can deliver a frequency response range from 14 Hz to 48 kHz. This, along with the Triple Adaptive EQ algorithm. It also feature an Intelligent ANC 3.0 technology that works with a tri-mic hybrid noise cancellation system, identifying and calculating noises inside and outside the ear in real time, tailoring the noise cancellation effects to real-time conditions. For calls, the FreeBuds Pro 3 have a Pure Voice 2.0 technology that improves voice pickup during voice and video calls. This technology also helps reducing background and wind noise, ensuring clear calls even in noisy environments. The FreeBuds Pro 3 support Bluetooth 5.2 and various audio codecs including AAC, L2HC 3.0, and LDAC3. They also have an expanded audio-sharing function and an offline search feature. In terms of battery life, the earbuds offer 4.5 hours of music playback with noise cancellation enabled, and up to 22 hours when used with the charging case. The earbuds come with a new XS ear tip size, making them suitable for more users. A more secure fit allows for better ANC performance. They are also rated IP54 for dust and water resistance.

== FreeBuds Studio ==
=== Huawei FreeBuds Studio ===
The Huawei FreeBuds Studio over-ear headphones released November 3, 2020, that comes with Kirin A1 chipset and sensors built-in. It has a noise cancelling system with active noise cancellation (ANC), hear-through and call noise cancellation. The smart multi-scene perception system which consists of IMU1 sensor and microphones system, completes 100 times scene detection per second. Thus, automatically adjusting the cancellation mode in different environments for a more suitable and comfortable active noise cancellation effect. The headphones offer an ultra-wide frequency response range from 4 Hz to 48 kHz. The battery has 24 hours of playback on a single charge with ANC switched off, and probably 15 hours of playback with ANC on.

== FreeBuds SE ==
=== Huawei FreeBuds SE ===
The lowest end of the FreeBuds line is the Huawei FreeBuds SE which are a pair of wireless earbuds with various features. Weighing just 4.7 grams each. They offer up to 24 hours of music playback with charging case, and can provide up to 6 hours of listening after a full charge.

The FreeBuds SE are equipped with Bluetooth 5.2 for robust connections. They support SBC and AAC audio formats. The earbuds also have an IPX4 rating, making them dust- and splash-resistant.

In terms of audio technology, they feature a 10 mm dynamic driver and ultra-sensitive composite diaphragm. They also have dual-mic Call Noise Cancellation and ultra-stable connections. The FreeBuds SE lower budget earbuds was first released on June 1, 2022, in global markets.

=== Huawei FreeBuds SE 2 ===
The second-generation of the low budget Huawei FreeBuds SE 2, weighing just 3.8 grams each. They offer up to 40 hours of music playback with the charging case, and can provide up to 3 hours of listening after just a 10-minute charge.

FreeBuds SE 2 are equipped with Bluetooth 5.3 for robust connections. They support SBC and AAC audio formats. The earbuds also have an IP54 rating, making them dust- and splash-resistant.

In terms of audio technology, they feature a 10.0 mm dynamic driver unit for high-quality sound. They also have call noise cancellation and Multi-EQ for enhanced call quality and balanced audio. FreeBuds SE 2 were released on July 10, 2023, globally.

== FreeLace ==
=== Huawei FreeLace ===
Huawei FreeLace is a lower budget line of semi-wireless earphones. The FreeLace band is made of ‘Memory Metal’, a mix of titanium and nickel, which settles to the shape of the neck. It includes a battery pack to the left and volume and control panel to the right.

The standard FreeLace earphones includes IPX5 sweat resistant. The control panel has a function button, for skipping tracks, play or pause music, as well as volume up and down buttons.

The Huawei FreeLace was released on April 11, 2019, marking the first sub line outside FreeBuds line introduced in March 2018.

=== Huawei FreeLace Pro ===
The higher end, Huawei FreeLace Pro was followed that included an improved audio experience, along with active noise cancellation. Like the first FreeLace design, it featured a nickel-titanium alloy “memory metal” neckband, which comprises an inline remote design. It detaches in the middle to reveal a Type-C USB port without a separate charge cable; easily recharge the earphones via the phone or laptop.

The FreeLace Pro boasts a 14mm dynamic driver unit and 40 dB noise cancellation. It includes audio playback, accompanied by active noise cancellation (ANC) technology. The earbuds last for 21 hours playback.

=== Huawei FreeLace Pro 2 ===
The higher end, Huawei FreeLace Pro 2 was announced by Huawei on March 27, 2024 which was released on April 4, 2024 in Chinese market. It features 25 hours of playback and supports fast charging through USB-C, providing 5 hours of listening time with 5 minute charge. The earbuds feature in-built USB-C connector to plug into Huawei smartphones for Bluetooth pairing via Huawei HiPair. Additionally, it can also be used to charge the earbuds through a smartphone, if smartphone is compatible with OTG feature. Easy control with button clicks for managing playback and calls.

== FreeClip ==
=== Huawei FreeClip ===
The Huawei FreeClip was officially released in the UK and European markets at the end of December 2023. It was launched in China on December 26, 2023, and went on pre-order in Europe on January 8, 2024, with a launch date of January 22, 2024. Huawei FreeClip features a C-bridge design that ensures a secure and comfortable fit. This design is based on data from over 10,000 human ears, ensuring a fit that feels tailored to your ears. Each earbud weighs 5.6 grams. The FreeClip has open-ear listening technology. The earbuds are interchangeable, with self-adaptive left-right audio channels, meaning you can wear either earbud on either ear.

The FreeClip is equipped with a 10.8 mm dual-magnet high-sensitivity driver unit. This, along with a reverse sound waves system built inside the acoustic ball, reducing sound leakage and sounds that are transmitted precisely into the ear canal for quality sound and calls.

For calls, the FreeClip uses a delicate microphone system that works in tandem with a multi-channel deep neural network (DNN) algorithm. This effectively picks out voices from ambient noises for clearer calls. The FreeClip comes with 8 hours of battery life when using the earbuds alone on a single charge, or up to 36 hours with a fully charged charging case. A quick 10-minute charge can provide up to 3 hours of listening.

The FreeClip can connect to two devices at once, such as phones, tablets, PCs, or watches, and seamlessly switch audio between them.

=== Huawei FreeClip 2 ===
The Huawei FreeClip 2 are open-ear wireless earbuds developed by Huawei and introduced as the successor to the original Huawei FreeClip. The earbuds were announced in December 2025 and became available in selected markets in January 2026. Like the first-generation model, the FreeClip 2 use a clip-on open-ear design, allowing user to listed to audio without blocking the ear canal

The FreeClip 2 feature aun updated C-bridge design, which connects the acoustic unit and the comfort bean around the outer ear. Each earbud weighs approximately 5.1 grams, making them lighter than the original FreeClip. The earbuds are designed for all-day comfort and environmental awareness, with an IP57 rating for water resistance. They also support self-adaptive left-right audio channels, allowing either earbud to be worn on either ear.

For audio playback, the FreeClip 2 are equipped with a 10.8 mm dual-diaphragm driver. Huawei states that the earbuds use adaptive open-ear listening technology, which adjusts volume depending on the surrounding environment. Due to their open-ear structure, the earbuds do not provide the same level of sound isolation as traditional in-aer earphones, but they are intended to balance audio playback with awareness of nearby sounds.

For calls, they use a microphone system supported by AI-based noise reduction. Huawei also includes an NPU AI processor designed to improve voice pickup and call clarity in noisy environments. These features are intended to separate the user's voice from background noise during phone calls and online meetings.

The FreeClip 2 offer up to 9 hours of music playback on a single charge, or up to 38 hours when used with the charging case, and a 10-minute quick charge can provide up to 3 hours of listening time. The charging case supports both USB-C wired charging and wireless charging, and they also support Bluetooth 6.0 and, as the original FreeClip, can be connected to two devices at the same time, such as smartphones, tablets, computers or smartwatches. They also include touch controls, swipe gestures for volume adjustment, and head motion controls for selected actions, like receive or reject calls.

== FreeBuds Neo ==
=== FreeBuds Neo ===
The HUAWEI FreeBuds Neo are wireless earbuds developed by the Chinese technology company Huawei, introduced in September 2026 as part of its FreeBuds lineup. The earbuds feature an in-ear design, with each earbud weighing approximately 4.8 grams, and are equipped with 11 mm dynamic drivers. They incorporate adaptive active noise cancellation (ANC), spatial audio capabilities, and touch controls for managing music playback, calls, and volume.

The HUAWEI FreeBuds Neo support Bluetooth 6.0 connectivity and simultaneous connection to two devices. They also feature an IP55 rating for dust and water resistance, which applies only to the earbuds. According to Huawei, battery life reaches up to 10 hours of music playback on a single charge with noise cancellation disabled, extending to 40 hours when used with the charging case. However, independent reviews have noted limitations related to software accessibility and the performance of active noise cancellation compared with competing wireless earbuds.
