= GaussDB =

Relational database software by Huawei

- Developer(s): Huawei
- Initial release: May 15, 2019; 5 years ago
- Stable release: June 7, 2023; 23 months ago
- Written in: C, Java
- Type: Relational database management system
- License: Proprietary
- Website: www.huaweicloud.com/intl/en-us/product/gaussdb.html

GaussDB is a proprietary enterprise-grade distributed AI-native relational database management system developed by Huawei which launched on May 15, 2019. It's designed for high performance and scalability, making it suitable for handling large data across servers.

GaussDB is reportedly extensively used within China's financial industry. Notably, it supports the businesses of state-owned banks including the Industrial and Commercial Bank of China, Postal Savings Bank of China, China Construction Bank, and Agricultural Bank of China.

== Overview ==
GaussDB supports application development in languages such as C and Java, and provides interfaces for JDBC and ODBC. An advanced generation of GaussDB was launched in June 2023. It also has an MySQL-compatible version and a NoSQL version.

GaussDB provides an array of capabilities for database management. These include adherence to ACID (Atomicity, Consistency, Isolation, Durability) principles, transaction handling, compatibility with diverse data types, indexing, query optimization, and security features.

== OpenGauss ==
OpenGauss
- Developer(s): Various (OpenAtom Foundation, Huawei and others)
- Initial release: July 1, 2020; 4 years ago
- Repository: gitee.com/opengauss
- Written in: C, Java
- Type: Relational database management system
- License: Apache license
- Website: www.huawei.com/en/open-source/

On July 1, 2020, Huawei released OpenGauss open source version of the relational database management system to the community under OpenAtom Foundation consortium in China and global markets. The platform supports DB instances of types, classes and backups with regions and projects using OpenStack resources with teams in departments.

== History ==
According to reports, Huawei began to develop its own in-memory database as far back as in 2001. In 2011, Huawei named the service, GaussDB. In 2016, it started as a mixture of multiple database systems for industries. By 2018, it was officially announced by the company. On May 15, 2019, GaussDB was officially launched in Beijing, China at Huawei's Developer Cloud event as an AI-native database. GaussDB is a standalone software package that can be used alongside Huawei's Fusion storage and also managed service from Huawei Cloud individually exclusively, outside third-party cloud providers support.

By June 7, 2023, GaussDB has evolved into a full-process software and hardware collaboration of chips, servers, storage, networks, operating systems, databases, and autonomy as an advanced stack.
