= Richard Heeks =

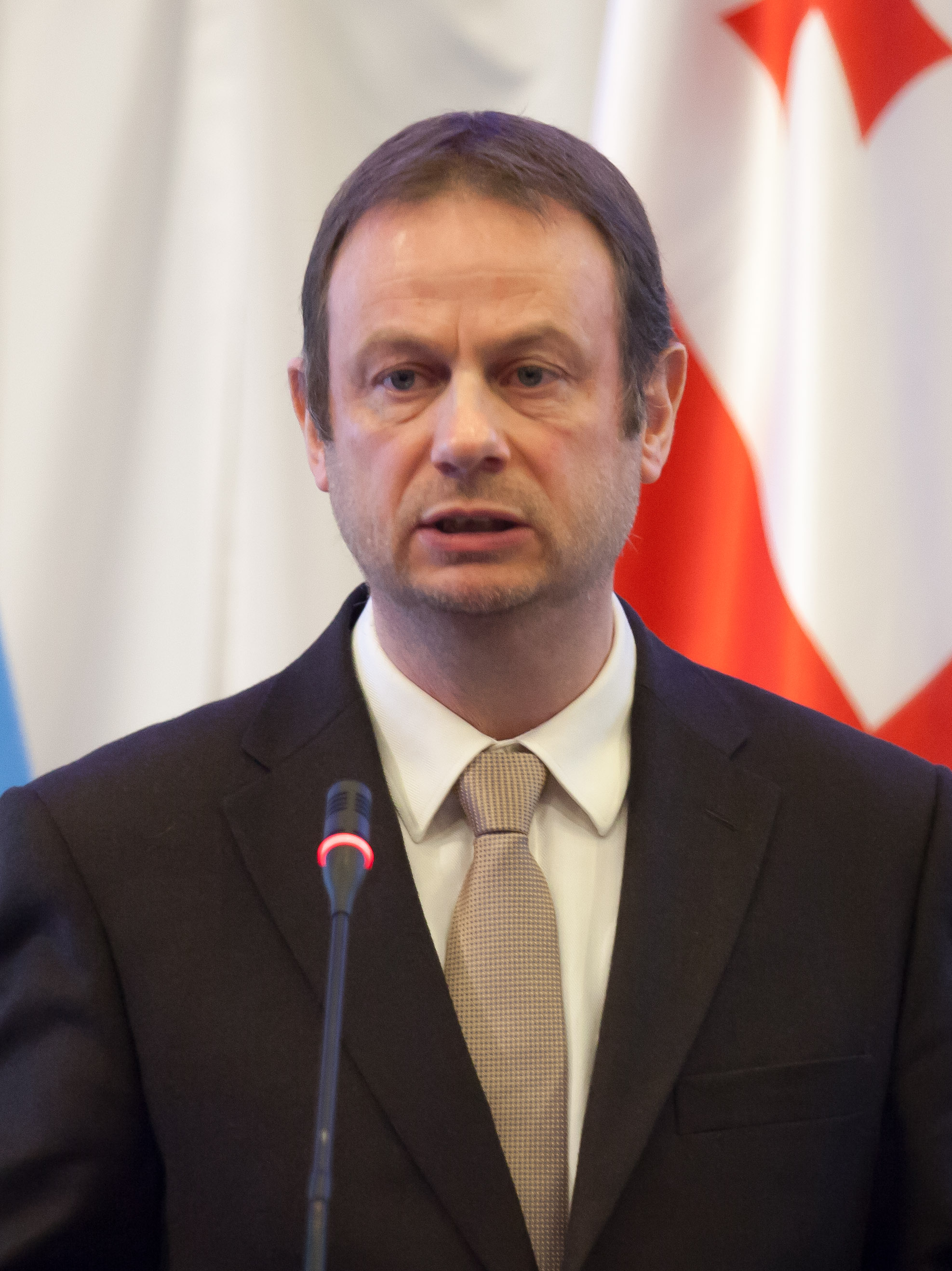
Richard Heeks

Richard Heeks is Professor of Digital Development in the Global Development Institute, University of Manchester, UK. He is Director of the University's Centre for Digital Development.

== Background ==
Richard Heeks was born in Reading, England; studied natural sciences at the University of Cambridge, and completed an MPhil at the University of Leicester and a PhD at the Open University, UK.

He worked as a software developer for ICL and a volunteer science teacher in Iluke-Bunu (1982-1984) Kabba/Bunu LGA Northental Nigeria before taking research positions with the University of Leicester and then University of Loughborough. In 1991, he joined the Institute for Development Policy and Management at the University of Manchester.

== Contributions ==
Heeks was one of the founding academics developing the field of "ICT4D": information and communication technologies for development. His early work included analytical study of the Indian software industry, which led to formation of the Software Export Success Model, used to analyse strengths and weaknesses of the software sector in developing countries.

Heeks worked during the late 1990s and early 2000s to develop the Design—Reality Gap model, which has been used to analyse the success and failure of ICT4D projects; particularly e-government projects. He also developed lesser-used models for analysis of information systems in international development: the "Information Chain" and the "Onion-Ring Model".

== Publications ==
Books

- Information and Communication Technologies for Development, Routledge, London, 2018
- Implementing and Managing eGovernment: An International Text, Sage Publications, London, 2008
- Reinventing Government in the Information Age, Routledge, London, 1999
- Technology and Developing Countries, Frank Cass, London, 1995
- India's Software Industry, Sage Publications, New Delhi, 1996
- Computerisation in Academic Departments, Taylor Graham, London, 1987
- Personal Bibliographic Indexes and Their Computerisation, Taylor Graham, London, 1986
