= HarmonyOS version history =

The version history of the HarmonyOS distributed operating system began with the public release of the HarmonyOS 1.0 for Honor Vision smart TVs on August 9, 2019. The first expanded commercial version of the Embedded, IoT AI, Edge computing based operating system, HarmonyOS 2.0, was released on June 2, 2021, for phones, tablets, smartwatches, smart speakers, routers, and internet of things. Beforehand, DevEco Studio, the HarmonyOS app development IDE, was released in September 2020 together with the HarmonyOS 2.0 Beta. HarmonyOS is developed by Huawei. New major releases are announced at the Huawei Developers Conference (HDC) in the every end of second quarter of each year together with the first public beta version of the operating system's next major version. The next major stable version is then released every fourth quarter of the following year since HarmonyOS 5. The current third generation HarmonyOS versions evolve from unified OpenHarmony-based HarmonyOS NEXT iterations since HarmonyOS 5 version. The current major version being HarmonyOS 7 which was released on September 7, 2026.

== Overview ==
The early mixed framework, pre-OpenHarmony, was the first public release of HarmonyOS 1.0 with LiteOS and Linux kernel space with AOSP compatibility layer occurred with the release of Huawei's former brand Honor Vision smart TVs on August 15, 2019, after it was announced on August 10, 2019, as the first HarmonyOS powered commercial product in Huawei's domestic market, China alongside smart IoT devices on LiteOS kernel.

The second generation evolved HarmonyOS into a fragmented mixed and multi-framework with HarmonyOS 2.0 with Linux kernel that carried AOSP dual-framework base mobile telephony with watered down OpenHarmony L3-L5 source code branch on top of EMUI fork was released on June 2, 2021 that began on December 16, 2020 that introduced early native mixed-HAP file format coexisting with APK with limited API functionalities on wearables, mobile and TVs, smart IoT screens, two months after OpenHarmony source code officially released on September 10, 2020, commercially in Huawei's domestic Chinese market, as de facto Beta testers for Chinese users, and was quickly adopted by 10 million users within a week. It was gradually rolled out globally to tablets, smartwatches and bands in Huawei's product lines between the second half of 2021 and the first half of 2022. Followed by HarmonyOS 3.0 API 8 iteration with the introduction of declarative programming and stronger Super Device connectivity with terminal devices in July 2022.

HarmonyOS 3.1 with API 9 and an enhanced feature built for Qualcomm Snapdragon chipsets set was released March 30, 2023 that was first preinstalled on the latest Huawei flagship smartphones Huawei P60 series.

The last major dual-framework release HarmonyOS 4.0 was released on August 4, 2023, followed by HarmonyOS 4.2 update and 4.3 factory maintenance iterations in April and November 2024 respectively, with OpenHarmony 3.2 API 9 that saw reduction of AOSP codebase on some started and small Linux kernel mode devices in transition with OpenHarmony L3-L5 codebase expansion on wearables as well as system hardening on Linux kernel level on mobile devices similar to custom AOSP-based GrapheneOS. At the same time, HarmonyOS NEXT was announced and launched internally for developers at HDC 2023 with demos. Followed by OpenHarmony 4.0 API 10 October 26, 2023 where both versions are in line with earlier HarmonyOS NEXT builds that is the unified modular OS software stack, closed distro branch from OpenHarmony L0-L2 pure codebase with the new microkernel-based HongMeng Kernel transitioning from Linux kernel on early internal builds demoed and transitioning completely from former HarmonyOS 4.x AOSP mobile and LiteOS kernel smart devices legacy versions.

On 18 January 2024, Huawei released its third generation iterative version of the operating system, a custom OpenHarmony-based HarmonyOS NEXT version, starting with Developer Preview 1 for all registered public developers in China that was integrated into the next HarmonyOS Galaxy Edition (Star River) version of HarmonyOS NEXT, folded into consumer HarmonyOS 5 version, the successor of current HarmonyOS which was announced at HarmonyOS Developers event held in China that is due for commercial release on November 26, 2024 that aims to replace the current dual-framework closed L3-L5 OpenHarmony source code version of classic HarmonyOS versions that contains Linux, AOSP and LiteOS compatibilities next to native HarmonyOS APIs which versioning are now streamlined with OpenHarmony L0-L2 branch open source code as single framework. The evolved HarmonyOS platform has vertical integration of Huawei's in-house HiSilicon Kirin chips and Ascend AI accelerator chips for private cloud AI processing on the platform. Major OpenHarmony OS core and common platform API upgrades are up streamed by OpenAtom Foundation. Minor custom in-house API upgrades by Huawei are downstreamed.

On June 20, 2025, Huawei dropped the 'NEXT' suffix going forward for HarmonyOS 6 version, second version of HarmonyOS NEXT iterative version as part of unification of the operating system into one single universal framework for all device types.

=== First Generation ===
Name	OS version	API version	Initial stable release date	Latest security patch version (release date)	AOSP version
HarmonyOS 1.0	1.0.0	5	August 9, 2019	1.0.1.66 SP3 (October 20, 2020)	Android 9 "Pie" (TV)
Legend: Unsupported Supported Latest version Preview version

=== Second Generation ===
Name	OS version	API version	Initial stable release date	Latest security patch version (release date)	OpenHarmony (OHOS) L3-L5 version	Latest Huawei Mobile Services version (release date)	AOSP/EMUI version
HarmonyOS 2	2.0.0	6	August 5, 2021	2.0.0.262 (May 2, 2023)	2.2 (L3-L5)	[HMS Core 6 AOSP] 6.10.4.302 (April 28, 2023)	Android 10-11/EMUI 12 (Mobile)
HarmonyOS 3	3.0.0	8	October 26, 2022	3.0.0.300 (July 12, 2023)	3.1 (L3-L5)	[HMS Core 6 AOSP] 6.11.0.331 (July 8, 2023)	Android 12/EMUI 13 (Mobile)
HarmonyOS 3.1	3.1.0	9	May 16, 2023	3.1.1.154 (February 5, 2024)	3.2 (L3-L5)	[HMS Core 6 AOSP] 6.13.0.302 (January 10, 2024)	Android 12/EMUI 13.1 (Mobile)
HarmonyOS 4	4.0.0	9	August 18, 2023	4.0.0.126 (January 19, 2024)	3.2 (L3-L5)	[HMS Core 6 AOSP] 6.13.0.302 (January 10, 2024)	Android 12/EMUI 14 (Mobile)
HarmonyOS 4.2	4.2.0	9	April 26, 2024	4.2.0.220 (November 27, 2025)	3.2 (L3-L5)	[HMS Core 6 AOSP] 6.15.0.332 (August 17, 2025)	Android 12/EMUI 14.2 (Mobile)
HarmonyOS 4.3	4.3.0	8	November 26, 2024	4.3.0.187 (October 22, 2025)	3.2 (L3-L5)	[HMS Core 6 AOSP] 6.15.0.332 (August 17, 2025)	Android 12/EMUI 15 (Mobile)
HarmonyOS 4.5 (TV)	4.5.0	9	September 24, 2024	4.5.0 (September 24, 2024)	3.2 (L3-L5)	[HMS Core 6 AOSP] 6.16.2.300.202403059755 (July 29, 2024)	Android 12 (TV)
HarmonyOS 5/NEXT Lite Wearable (OpenHarmony Lite/LiteOS kernel)	5.0.0	12	September 19, 2024	5.0.0.159 (February 14, 2025)	3.2 (L3-L5)	—N/a	—N/a
Legend: Unsupported Supported Latest version Preview version

=== Third Generation ===
Name	Codename API version	Initial stable release date	Latest security patch version (release date)	HarmonyOS system version	OpenHarmony (OHOS) L0-L2 downstream version
HarmonyOS 5	5.0.4(16)	November 26, 2024	5.0.0.155 (April 19, 2025)	5.0.0	OpenHarmony 5.0.0
HarmonyOS 5.0.1	5.0.5(17)	March 30, 2025	5.0.1.130 (June 21, 2025)	5.0.1	OpenHarmony 5.0.1
HarmonyOS 5.1	5.1.1(19)	June 11, 2025	5.1.0.265 (November 15, 2025)	5.1.0	OpenHarmony 5.1.0
HarmonyOS 6	6.0.1(21)	November 25, 2025	6.0.0.115 (November 25, 2025)	6.0.0	OpenHarmony 6.0.0
HarmonyOS 7	?	September 9, 2026			
Legend: Unsupported Supported Latest version Preview version

== Version history ==
The following tables above show the release dates and key features of all HarmonyOS operating system updates to date, listed chronologically by their official application programming interface (API) versions as listed below in detail:

== HarmonyOS 1 ==
HarmonyOS 1.0 [1.0.0 - OpenHarmony 1.0.0] (API version 5)

The first release of HarmonyOS was on August 9, 2019, for the Honor-branded smart TV series, followed by Huawei Vision S-branded smart TV series during (HDC) Huawei Developer Conference of 2019 alongside Wireless Wi-Fi routers and IoT systems in 2020. The system incorporated the HarmonyOS microkernel for Trusted execution environment with hardware and user authentication for security, alongside system for Linux kernel and LiteOS kernel space. Introduced with in-house development using Ark Compiler with LiteOS Studio IDE for third-party apps in LiteOS kernel and Linux kernel environment with Ark Compiler Android apps support on AOSP libraries with comprehensive programming languages support as well as Huawei Quick App IDE for Quick Apps for Vision TVs on screen and screenless devices, this version incorporates the key modules based on the open-source framework with the following features:

=== HarmonyOS 1.0.1 ===
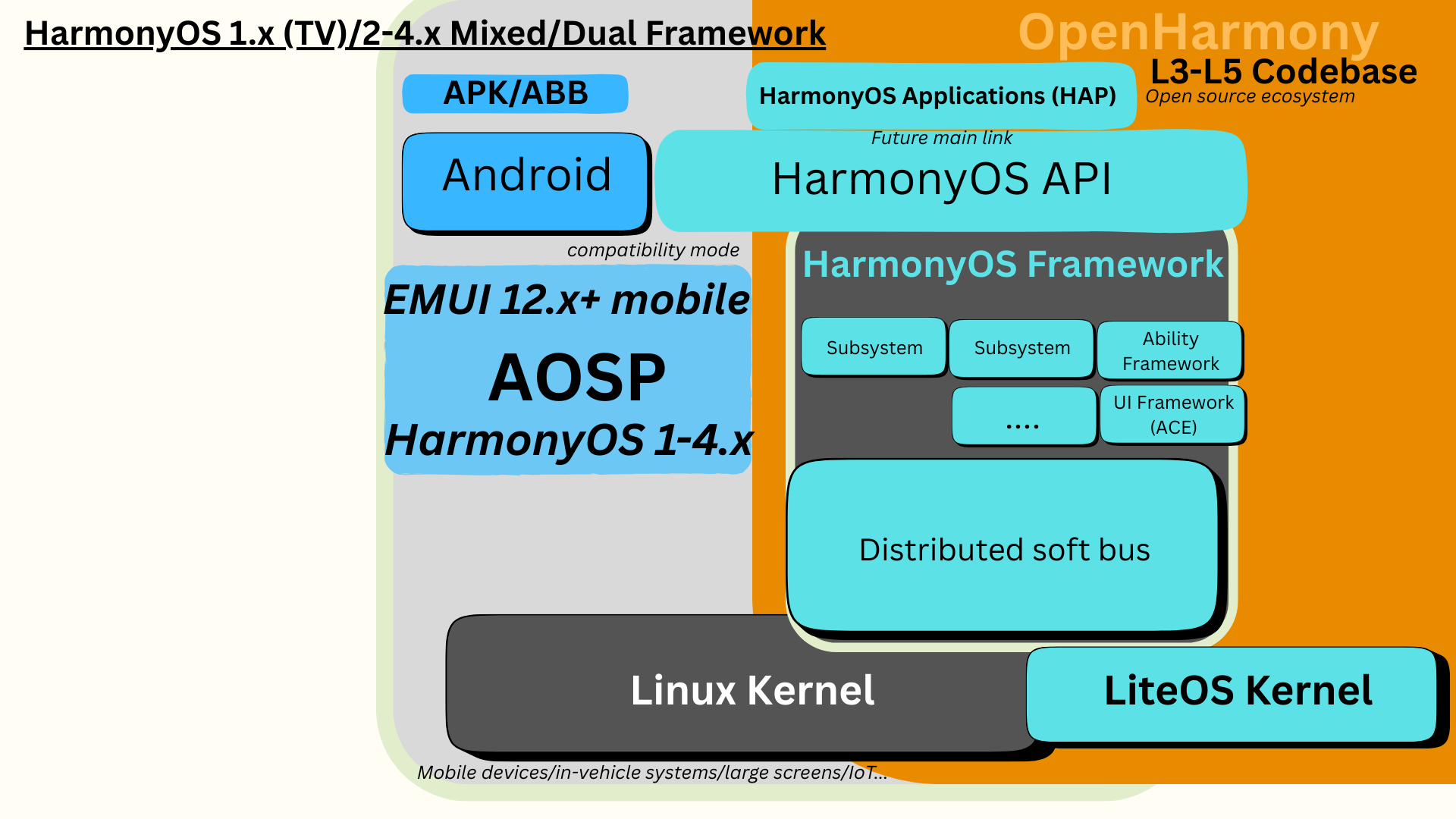
HarmonyOS Dual/Mixed Framework Diagram

On September 9, 2020, Huawei opened up HAP app development for HarmonyOS 1.0.1 Vision TV with the new DevEco Studio IDE alongside HarmonyOS 2 Beta with the newer HarmonyOS SDK that introduced the new HarmonyOS API framework with HAP file format for universal app development between IoT and TV systems which began dual/mixed framework of HarmonyOS TV systems and eventually HarmonyOS 2 across mobile and car systems. Huawei donated HarmonyOS 1.0 L0-L2 branch source code to the OpenAtom Foundation, and launched the first version of the open source variant operating system called OpenHarmony 1.0 on September 10, 2020. The final minor update for Honor and Huawei Vision TVs, HarmonyOS 1.0.1.66 SP3 was released October 20, 2020.

== HarmonyOS 2 ==
HarmonyOS 2 was launched at the Huawei Developer Conference on 10 September 2020 as a public beta for smart home applications, smartwatches, and head-on-displays and Vision TVs only. Huawei announced it intended to ship the operating system on its smartphones in 2021. The first developer beta of HarmonyOS 2.0 was released on December 16, 2020, for the Chinese domestic market on older Huawei smartphone models which include developer features to build HAP apps and SDK tools for developers. Huawei also released the DevEco Studio 1.0 IDE, which is based on IntelliJ IDEA, and a cloud emulator for developers in early access on September 9, 2020. An updated DevEco Studio 2.0 IDE Developer Beta version for HarmonyOS app development with HarmonyOS 2.0 beta on smartphones on December 16, 2020 with subsequent beta releases of 2.1 beta releases in the early first half of 2021. The system was able to run native HarmonyOS apps built on HarmonyOS Ability Package (HAP) with a new app package .app across the whole ecosystem of devices.

Released as public beta on June 2, 2021, HarmonyOS 2 includes in-house development for the teeOS kernel and app framework for the general public in the Chinese domestic market of smartphones, tablets, HiCar systems, wearables, IoT systems and Vision TVs with an updated DevEco Studio 2.1 IDE alongside subsequent DevEco Studio 2.2 beta releases afterwards.

On August 5, 2021, stable official release of HarmonyOS 2 was launched on 65 Huawei devices in China.

This version includes a new Harmony OS 2.0 home screen based on EMUI design, new control panel design layout with Super Device, Service Center, Service Cards, and App Snippets for the atomic services platform exclusive to native HarmonyOS apps. It has shared multitasking known as Task Center for Huawei devices between phone and tablets as well as running more than one app on tablet and phone screens. The new OS is also optimized for Huawei Super Device, connecting Huawei computers, tablets and smartphones with on-screen gestures and multi-screen collaboration.

=== HarmonyOS 2.0.1 ===
On October 15, 2021 Nova 9 series received an incremental update of HarmonyOS 2 that adds short video creation with Camera and other optimizations refining the system.

=== HarmonyOS 2.1 ===
MatePad Paper factory in March 16, 2022 and subsequent updates alongside Huawei Watches such as Watch GT3, Watch 3 and Watch D received HarmonyOS 2.1 updates in October 25, 2021.

== HarmonyOS 3 ==
HarmonyOS 3.0 [3.0.0 - OpenHarmony 3.1] (API version 8), HarmonyOS 3 was announced on Huawei Developers Conference 2021 on October 22, 2021. and launched on July 27, 2022 as beta with stable release on October 26, 2022 in China.

The Harmony OS 3 version was reported to bring more stability and increased performance of the system's kernel for better user experience and low power consumption. The new release also aims to bring more power to the Super Device feature, which allows connectivity between smart devices with a single super device such as a smartphone. It includes Huawei services such as Huawei Mobile Services (HMS) for Harmony Ability Packages (HAP) native HarmonyOS apps, Celia Assistant and Service Center in global markets.

Java language support dropped on HMOS 3.0 for main full support of eTS, JS programming languages in the new version of the operating system with an updated DevEco Studio 3.0 IDE released afterwards on September 17, 2022. Since API Level 8, .hap apps can run on both HarmonyOS and OpenHarmony simultaneously in one unified development environment as one project.

Huawei aims to release the new version of the operating system globally to older models gradually and release new smartphone and tablet models in two months after the release.

=== HarmonyOS 3.1 ===
HarmonyOS 3.1 [3.1.0 - OpenHarmony 3.2] (API version 9) was announced on Huawei Developers Conference 2022 on November 4, 2022 as closed beta and launched on March 30, 2023, as public beta with stable release on May 16, 2023 in Chinese domestic market.

The Harmony OS 3.1 version was reported being a more evolution of version 3.0, that brings more stability at API level and increased system animation fluidness improvements as well as visually refined on the user interface side for better user experiences and also API improvements for app developers with a following release of an updated DevEco Studio 3.1 IDE on April 8, 2023.

== HarmonyOS 4 ==
HarmonyOS 4.0 [4.0.0 - OpenHarmony 3.2] (API version 9), HarmonyOS 4 was announced and launched at Huawei Developers Conference 2023 on August 4, 2023, as public beta. HarmonyOS 4.0 stable version rolled out to various 34 smartphone and tablet model devices between August 18 and August 29, 2023, on .111, .112 and .113 stable builds in China.

The Harmony OS 4.0 version brings more advanced features set at API level and increased system animation fluidness improvements as well as visually refined on the user interface side for better user experiences and also API improvements for app developers.

=== HarmonyOS 4.2 ===
By 2024, HarmonyOS 4 went through subsequent upgrades on Huawei devices starting with HarmonyOS 4.2. On April 18, 2024, Huawei Pura 70 flagship series lineup shipped with HarmonyOS 4.2 incremental upgrade out of the box with subsequent incremental updates post-launch.

=== HarmonyOS 4.3 ===
Mate 70 series, Mate X6 non-Pioneer SKUs in China launched with HarmonyOS 4.3 factory software incremental upgrade on November 26, 2024 and global version of MatePad Pro 13.2 came with HarmonyOS 4.3 on 18, February 2025 out of the box.

=== HarmonyOS 4.5 ===
Huawei only Vision TV series, V5 Max 110 inch smart TV shipped with HarmonyOS 4.5 version on September 24, 2024.

== HarmonyOS 5 ==
=== HarmonyOS NEXT ===
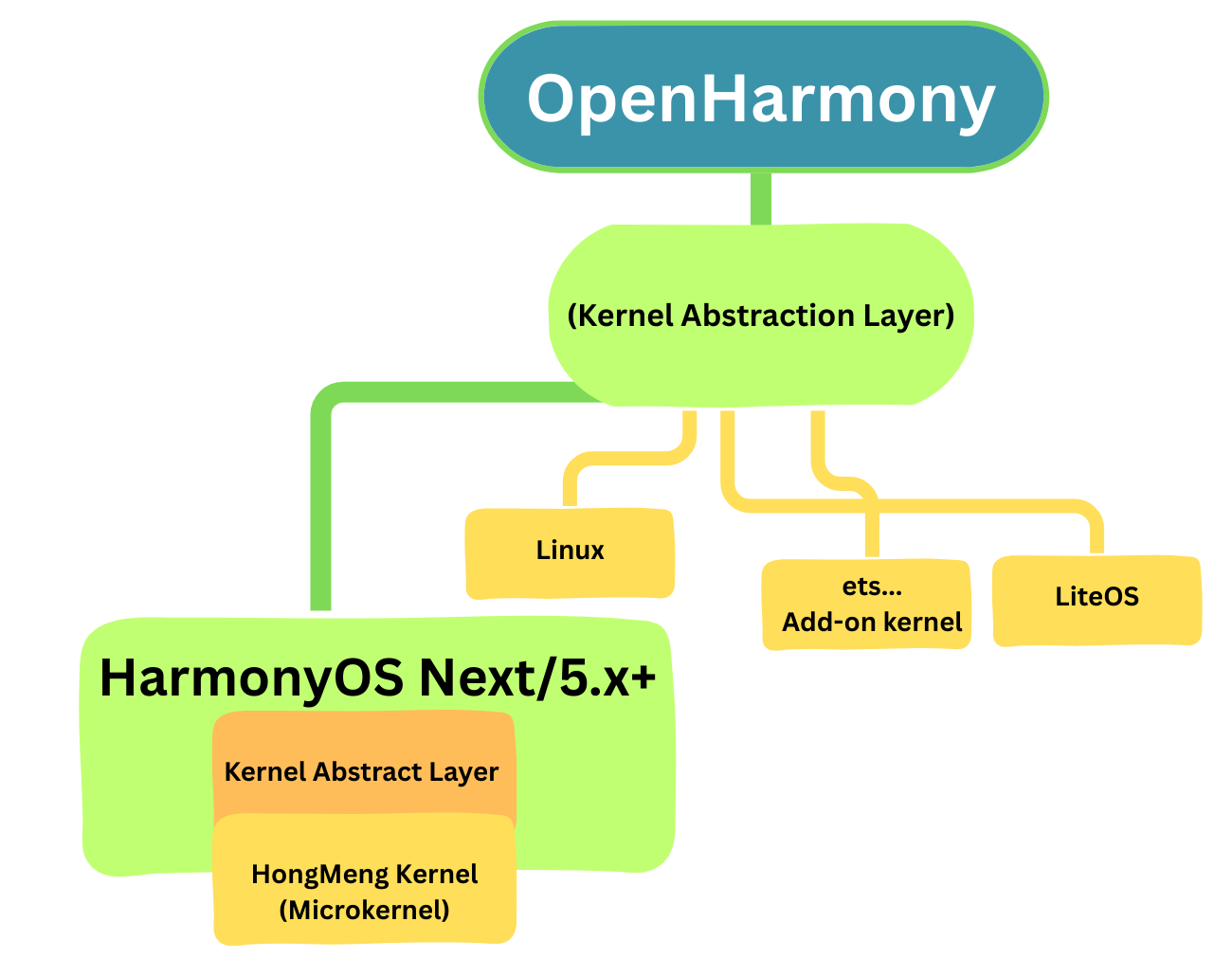
HarmonyOS NEXT/5.x+ Architecture

HarmonyOS 5 [5.0.0 - OpenHarmony 5.0.0] (API version 12) August 4, 2023 (API 9) Developer Preview 1 for HarmonyOS NEXT internal cooperative developers, for native software development switched from L3-L5 dual framework to pure unified, single L0-L2 source code branch codebase of full fledged OpenHarmony base. January 2024 Developer Preview 1 Beta for public registered developers (API 10), Q2 Developer Preview 2 (API 11–12), Public Beta (API 12) builds and Commercial (API 12) stable builds:

On January 18, 2024, at the HarmonyOS Developer event in China, Huawei announced that the third generation HarmonyOS operating system with an internal version called HarmonyOS Galaxy Edition on HarmonyOS NEXT system. The developer preview version is open for application development, alongside the release of Beta version for enterprise developers ahead of HarmonyOS 5. The HarmonyOS NEXT version of HarmonyOS Galaxy Edition developer beta version of the program is due for Q2 launch for all unregistered public developers as HarmonyOS NEXT system is integrated into the operating system of HarmonyOS 5 general release version as planned.

A commercial system version for all users is to be released in Q4 on the commercial HarmonyOS 5.0.0 baseline preview version, from the previous HarmonyOS 4.0 versioning requirement baseline OTA rollout on specific devices, alongside new factory devices shipped with the new OS.

The first batch of devices tested on HarmonyOS NEXT Developer Preview 1 are the Mate 60, Mate 60 Pro, and Mate X5 phones.

On April 2, 2024, External beta expansion of Developer Preview 2 rolled out on more registered developers' handsets with latest pre-release canary build.

On April 11, 2024, the company announced its incoming HarmonyOS 5.0.0 operating system version of Galaxy Edition version under HarmonyOS NEXT system that will first be released as open beta program for developers and users at its annual Huawei Developer Conference in June 2024 before Q4 commercial consumer release with upcoming Mate 70 flagship, among other ecosystem devices.

On June 21, 2024, at the Huawei Developer Conference of 2024, the company announced its Developer Beta 1 program for registered developers introducing Developer wide program in China outside Huawei partners oriented Developer Preview builds. It included key features such as Harmony Intelligence embedded in the OS AI system stack of PanGu 5.0 upgraded LLM with Embedded variant, MindSpore with Neural Network Runtime API kit that includes the new smarter Celia (Xiaoyi) AI body Feed with further finalised UI overhaul enhancements across the system.

On September 27, 2024, Huawei rolled out the last internal beta version patch NEXT.0.0.70 with EROFS support. On October 7, 2024, latest beta version patch NEXT.0.0.71 released alongside public beta launch on October 8 with 5.0.0 release beta soft launch by October 22, 2024.

On October 22, 2024, HarmonyOS 5.0 was officially launched as the "HarmonyOS NEXT 5" brand, after the public beta was released on October 8, 2024.

On November 3, 2024, HarmonyOS NEXT beta version 5.0.0.102 update was released added "Touch to share" and "Multiple group" functions for sharing capabilities with device interactions.

On November 8, 2024, HarmonyOS NEXT beta version 5.0.0.102 SP8 update came with screen reading functionality.

On November 18, 2024 HarmonyOS NEXT beta version 5.0.0.107 came with improved camera functionalities and optimisations. On November 19, 2024 tablet HarmonyOS NEXT beta version 5.0.0.107 SP8 update improved file and other system functionalities of utilities.

On November 26, 2024, general release of HarmonyOS 5 for Mate 70 series and Mate X6, MatePad Pro 13.2 2025 (2024) Pioneer Edition factory SKUs on stable factory version of 5.0.0.111 with subsequent beta and stable updates after from API 5.0.0 12 with 5.0.0.102 beta on October 22, 2024, 5.0.1 13 with 5.0.0.123 on January 8, 2025, 5.0.2 API 14 with 5.0.0.126(SP8) on February 17 2025, 5.0.3 API 15 on March 15, 2025, API 5.0.4 16 on March 29, 2025 as HarmonyOS NEXT iterations ecosystem matured. HarmonyOS 5.0.0.110 SP6 public beta also released.

On April 17, 2025, final update, HarmonyOS NEXT 5.0.0.155 SP6 public beta rolled out starting from MatePad tablets and Pura 70 and Mate 60 series models and eventually became stable by end of April to early May 2025 to all supported models.

=== HarmonyOS 5 NEXT Lite Wear ===
On September 19, 2024, at Huawei consumer event in Barcelona, the company announced Huawei Watch GT 5 series line that ships with transitional early builds of HarmonyOS 5 NEXT Lite Wearable system software, marking it the first devices out of the box.

On September 24, 2024, Huawei Watch GT 5 HarmonyOS 5.0.0.97 first update rolled out. On September 30, 2024, Huawei released another following 5.0.0.100 update for Watch GT 6 series.

On January 13, 2025, HarmonyOS 5.0.0.36 update expanded to older supported Huawei Watch GT 4 with new features and optimizations on par with newer Huawei Watch GT 5 series.

On February 14, 2025, HarmonyOS 5.0.0.159 update rolled out to Huawei Watch GT 5 series with upgraded health and payment capabilities.

On February 14, 2025, HarmonyOS 5.0.0.159 final patch update of HarmonyOS 5.0 NEXT Lite Wearable system rolled out to global users on Huawei Watch GT 5 series.

=== HarmonyOS 5.0.1 ===
Huawei Pura X 16:10 wide foldable phone announced and launched on March 20th and went on sale on March 30, 2025 as the first device to run HarmonyOS 5.0.1 out of the box with 5.0.5 (17) API. On May 19, 2025, HarmonyOS 5.0.1 stable with 5.0.1.120 SP3 with older 5.0.4 (16) API had been rolled out to eligible devices.

=== HarmonyOS 5.1 ===
On June 11, 2025, Huawei launched HarmonyOS 5.1 with 5.1.0 (18) API version included in Pura 80 series lineup that came with new functionalities, with beta releases and then stable update became available for other devices by July 31, 2025 on older API build 16 from previous HarmonyOS 5.0.1 version, lasting weeks into early August 2025 complete rollout.

== HarmonyOS 6 ==
On June 20, 2025 Huawei formerly announced HarmonyOS 6 Developer Beta with 6.0.0 API version 20 at HDC 2025, with rollouts and expansions of the developer beta program went throughout July and August up till September. On the latest HarmonyOS 6 platform, older supported devices unified in down streamed native HarmonyOS API versions as latest Huawei device launches on HarmonyOS 6 unlike HarmonyOS 5 versions, eliminating API fragmentation for developers. A consumer beta was officially announced and released to supported eligible models on October 22, 2025 marking the commercialisation of the version with 6.0.1 API 21 beta. On November 25, 2025, Huawei officially launched and released Mate 80 series with an official stable general release of HarmonyOS 6.0.0.115 stable build of 6.0.1 API 21 with supported models such as Mate 70. Subsequent rollouts on eligible devices followed late November to early December wave in mainland China market.

Features and changes:

- New "Tap to connect" feature.
- Add new Enterprise Space Kit API for enterprise consumers.
- Add new Screen Time Guard Kit and Data Augmentation Kit API.
- Update ArkWeb to Chromium 132 LTS
- Add new Float Ball feature, allows the application to present key information in a small window mode. After switching to the small window mode, users can perform other interface operations.
- Merge the NearLink and Bluetooth entries in the System Settings.
- StratoVirt virtualization framework included in HarmonyOS PC has added support for DirectX 11 and DirectX 12 vGPU and emulated battery devices.
- Globalisation of system languages and regions supported.

== HarmonyOS 7 ==
On 7 September 2026, Huawei launched HarmonyOS 7 together with the new Mate XT 2 smartphone. The seventh major release of HarmonyOS was reportedly focused on stronger security and a significant further development in the field of artificial intelligence.

== See also ==
- iOS version history
- Android version history
- Windows 10 version history
- LiteOS
- EulerOS
