= HarmonyOS =

Distributed operating system by Huawei

Harmony OS
- Developer: Huawei
- Written in: C, C++, JavaScript (Lite), ArkTS, Cangjie, Rust and others
- OS family: OpenHarmony
- Working state: Current
- Source model: Closed, with open source components
- Initial release: August 9, 2019; 7 years ago
- Latest release: 7.0.0 / September 7, 2026; 2 months ago
- Marketing target: Embedded systems, smartphones, tablet computers, Laptops, wearable devices, Personal computers, Cars, Audio equipments, smart TVs
- Available in: 14 languages
- Update method: Over-the-air
- Package manager: .app
- Supported platforms: 64-bit ARM
- Kernel type: Microkernel (HongMeng Kernel)
- Userland: System Service Layer (OSKA custom DHardwareUI)
- Default user interface: Harmony Design (Design System) (multi-touch, GUI)
- License: Commercial software, Proprietary software except for open-source components
- Preceded by: LiteOS, EMUI, Android and Microsoft Windows
- Official website: developer.huawei.com/consumer/en/harmonyos/develop/

Support status
- Supported

Articles in the series

HarmonyOS
- Simplified Chinese: 鸿蒙操作系统
- Traditional Chinese: 鴻蒙操作系統
Transcriptions
Standard Mandarin
- Hanyu Pinyin: Hóngméng Cāozuò Xìtǒng
- Bopomofo: ㄏㄨㄥˊ ㄇㄥ
- Tongyong Pinyin: Hóng Méng Cāo Zuò Xì Tǒng
Yue: Cantonese
- Yale Romanization: Hùhng Mùhng
- Jyutping: Hung4 Mung4 Cou1 Zok3 Hai6 Tung2

HarmonyOS (HMOS) (Chinese: 鸿蒙操作系统; pinyin: Hóngméng Cāozuò Xìtǒng; trans. "Vast Mist") is a distributed operating system developed by Huawei for smartphones, tablets, smart TVs, smart watches, personal computers and other smart devices. It has a microkernel design with a single framework: the operating system selects suitable kernels from the abstraction layer in the case of devices that use diverse resources. The latest stable version, HarmonyOS 7, released in September 2026.

From 2019 to 2024, versions 1 to 4.3 (4.5 TV) of the operating system were built by integrating the Android Open Source Project (AOSP) with OpenHarmony, allowing it to support both HarmonyOS and Android apps. The current iteration of HarmonyOS became known as HarmonyOS NEXT (later it was renamed HarmonyOS 5 in launched of Pura X). HarmonyOS NEXT was announced on August 4, 2023, and officially launched on October 22, 2024. It also replaced the OpenHarmony multi-kernel system with its own HongMeng Kernel at its core and removed all Android code. Since version 5, HarmonyOS only supports apps in its native "App" format.

HarmonyOS was officially launched by Huawei, and first used in Honor smart TVs, in August 2019. It was later used in Huawei wireless routers, IoT in 2020, followed by smartphones, tablets and smartwatches from June 2021.

== Name ==
In 2015, Huawei launched a research and development strategy for self-developed core technologies including operating systems and databases. At that time, its own operating system did not have a name, and there was only a group of engineers designing the architecture, writing code, and designing core technologies.

In 2019, Huawei applied for a trademark called "Huawei Hongmeng" (华为鸿蒙) for the kernel of its own operating system. At that time, when the company was still struggling with what to name its operating system, the public mistakenly thought the trademark of the system kernel was the name of an operating system. Finally, the official named the operating system "Hongmeng" (Chinese: 鸿蒙; lit. 'Vast Mist'). The name "Hongmeng" represents "the vitality of all things at the beginning of their creation". The English name chosen was "HarmonyOS", symbolizing "the interconnection of all things and harmonious coexistence."

== History ==
=== Early development ===
Reports surrounding an in-house operating system being developed by Huawei date back as far as 2012 in R&D stages with HarmonyOS system stack going back as early as 2015. These reports intensified during the Sino-American trade war, after the United States Department of Commerce added Huawei to its Entity List in May 2019 under an indictment that it knowingly exported goods, technology and services of U.S. origin to Iran in violation of sanctions. This prohibited U.S.-based companies from doing business with Huawei without first obtaining a license from the government. Huawei executive Yu Chengdong described an in-house platform as a "plan B" in case it is prevented from using Android on future smartphone products due to the sanctions.

Prior to its unveiling, it was originally speculated to be a mobile operating system that could replace Android on future Huawei devices. In June 2019, an Huawei executive told Reuters that the OS was under testing in China, and could be ready "in months." But by July 2019, some Huawei executives described the OS as being an embedded operating system designed for IoT hardware, discarding the previous statements for it to be a mobile operating system.

Some media outlets reported that this OS, referred to as "Hongmeng", could be released in China in either August or September 2019, with a worldwide release in the second quarter of 2020. On 24 May 2019, Huawei registered "Hongmeng" as a trademark in China. The name "Hongmeng" came from Chinese mythology that symbolizes primordial chaos or the world before creation. The same day, Huawei registered trademarks surrounding "Ark OS" and variants with the European Union Intellectual Property Office. In July 2019, it was reported that Huawei had also registered trademarks surrounding the word "Harmony" for desktop and mobile operating system software, indicating either a different name or a component of the OS.

HarmonyOS 5 official development began in July 2021 under an internal codename "543-2" as part of entire OpenHarmony codebase Project 543 within Huawei internally since 2015 before being open sourced in September 2020 alongside the HongMeng Kernel project which officially began internally in 2016. It was first unveiled at HDC 2023, branded as HarmonyOS NEXT Developer Preview on August 4, 2023. Technical demos were on the Mate 40 Pro and MatePad Pro 12.6, which were both powered by the Kirin 9000 chip. Following the August 29, 2023 announcement of the Mate 60 Pro, featuring the Kirin 9000S, Huawei shifted development focus to the new in-house Kirin 9000S custom chip platform. At Huawei's autumn full-scenario launch event on September 25, 2023, Huawei officially launched the "HarmonyOS NEXT Program." The final known build supporting the original Kirin 9000 was HarmonyOS build 4.1.0.73, based on OpenHarmony 4.1, up-streamed with API 11. The semi-finished software Developer Preview officially released to developers on January 18, 2024, which was internally referenced to as "HarmonyOS OH1.0". It originally had selected the old standard Linux kernel of kernel-agnostic KAL system by default for OpenHarmony standard system for mobile and computing type devices in partner internal developer builds externally before retrofitting the new in-house microkernel, HongMeng Kernel, which was in production on Canary builds of HarmonyOS NEXT Developer Preview on January 18, 2024. It replaced Linux kernel on physical hardware, leaving the old Linux kernel for x86 app development emulators on Windows and macOS versions of legacy JetBrains-based DevEco Studio IDE. This build featured distinct icons and a control center design differing from the RTM version, with placeholder wallpapers. A public preview program followed on June 21, 2024, after Developer Preview 2 in April 2024. Build 5.0.0.102 became the first to identify itself as HarmonyOS 5 after replacing the 'NEXT' suffix on the build numbers throughout pre-consumer public beta builds. The PC version was showcased at the HarmonyOS Computer Technology and Ecosystem Communication Conference using MateBook Pro prototypes on May 8, 2025, as first look.

=== Framework transitions ===
Early versions of classic HarmonyOS, starting from version 1.0, employed a "kernel abstraction layer" (KAL) subsystem to support a multi-kernel architecture. This allowed developers to choose different operating system kernels based on the resources available on each device. For low-powered devices such as wearables and Huawei's GT smartwatches, HarmonyOS utilized the LiteOS kernel instead of Linux. It also integrated the LiteOS SDK for TV applications and ensured compatibility with Android apps through the Ark Compiler and a dual-framework approach. HarmonyOS 1.0's original L0-L2 source code branch was contributed to the OpenAtom Foundation to accelerate system development.

HarmonyOS 2.0 introduced a modified version of OpenHarmony's L3-L5 source code, expanding its compatibility across smartphones and tablets. Underneath the kernel abstraction layer (KAL) subsystem, HarmonyOS used the Linux kernel and the AOSP codebase. This setup enabled Android APK files and App Bundles (AAB) to run natively, similar to older Huawei EMUI-based devices, without needing root access.

Additionally, HarmonyOS supported native apps packaged for Huawei Mobile Services through the Ark Compiler, leveraging the OpenHarmony framework within its dual-framework structure at the System Service Layer. This configuration allowed the operating system to run apps developed with restricted HarmonyOS APIs.

Until the release of HarmonyOS 5, also known as HarmonyOS NEXT, using its microkernel within a single framework, replacing the operating system dual-framework approach for Huawei's HarmonyOS devices with the AOSP codebase.

=== Release ===
On 9 August 2019, three months after the Entity List ban, Huawei publicly unveiled HarmonyOS, which Huawei said it had been working on since 2012, at its inaugural developers' conference in Dongguan. Huawei described HarmonyOS as a free, microkernel-based distributed operating system for various types of hardware. The company focused primarily on IoT devices, including smart TVs, wearable devices, and in-car entertainment systems, and did not explicitly position HarmonyOS as a mobile OS.

HarmonyOS 2.0 launched at the Huawei Developer Conference on 10 September 2020. Huawei announced it intended to ship the operating system on its smartphones in 2021. The first developer beta of HarmonyOS 2.0 was launched on 16 December 2020. Huawei also released the DevEco Studio IDE, which is based on IntelliJ IDEA, and a cloud emulator for developers in early access.

Huawei officially released HarmonyOS 2.0 and launched new devices shipping with the OS in June 2021, and started rolling out system upgrades to Huawei's older phones for users gradually.

On July 27, 2022, Huawei launched HarmonyOS 3, providing an improved experience across multiple devices such as smartphones, tablets, printers, cars and TVs. It also launched Petal Chuxing, a ride-hailing app running on the new version of the operating system.

On 29 June 2023, Huawei launched the first developer beta of HarmonyOS 4. On 4 August 2023, Huawei officially announced and released HarmonyOS 4 as a public beta. On 9 August, it rolled the operating system out on 34 different existing Huawei smartphone and tablet devices—albeit as a public beta build. Alongside HarmonyOS 4, Huawei also announced the launch of HarmonyOS NEXT, which is a "pure" HarmonyOS version, without Android libraries and therefore incompatible with Android apps post-software convergence.

On 18 January 2024, Huawei announced commercialisation of HarmonyOS NEXT with a Galaxy stable version rollout beginning in Q4 2024 based on OpenHarmony 5.0 (API 12) version after OpenHarmony 4.1 (API 11) based Q2 Developer Beta after release of public developer access of HarmonyOS NEXT Developer Preview 1 that has been in the hands of closed cooperative developers partners since August 2023 debut. The new system of upcoming HarmonyOS 5 version that replaced HarmonyOS multi-kernel dual-frame system convergence for unified system stack of the unified app ecosystem for commercial Huawei consumer devices.

On March 11, 2024, Huawei announced the early recruitment for the new test experience version of Huawei HarmonyOS 4 firmware update, which included improvements to performance and user experiences. HarmonyOS version 4.0.0.200 (C00E200R2P7) of the firmware was gradually rolled out on March 12, 2024.

On April 11, 2024, it was reported that Huawei opened the registration and rolled out the public beta of HarmonyOS 4.2 for 24 devices. On the same day, the company announced its incoming HarmonyOS 5.0 operating system version of Galaxy Edition version under the HarmonyOS NEXT system, which would first be released as an open beta program for developers and users at its annual Huawei Developer Conference in June 2024. The commercial consumer release with upcoming other devices, like the Mate 70 flagship, would follow in Q4.

On April 18, 2024, Huawei Pura 70 flagship series lineup received the HarmonyOS 4.2.0.137 update, after release.

On April 17, 2024, Huawei's chairman Eric Xu revealed plans to push the native HarmonyOS NEXT system for next gen HarmonyOS in global markets as the company's focus at Huawei's Analyst Summit 2024 (HAS 2024) to the Chinese and international press.

On May 17, 2024, during the HarmonyOS Developer Day (HDD) event, Huawei announced a HarmonyOS upgrade with the new HarmonyOS NEXT base beginning commercial use by September with over 800 million devices and 4,000 apps in use. A total of 5,000 apps was targeted for launch.

On June 21, 2024, during the Huawei Developer Conference (HDC) keynote, Huawei announced HarmonyOS NEXT Developer Beta for registered developers and 3,000 pioneer users on limited models such as the Huawei Mate 60 Series, Huawei Mate X5 Series and Huawei MatePad Pro 13.2 tablet. The consumer beta version was expected to be released in August 2024, while the stable build would be made available in Q4 2024. During the conference, Huawei formally announced the in-house Cangjie programming language for the new native system, alongside the release of the Developer Preview Beta recruitment program.

On October 22, 2024, at the Huawei HarmonyOS Next event, it was officially revealed as "Native" HarmonyOS NEXT brand transitioning to HarmonyOS 5, incorporated as HarmonyOS 5.0.0 version, for public beta with 2025 expansions. Ahead of flagship devices with stable builds factory on November 26, 2024.

Subsequent HarmonyOS NEXT releases of HarmonyOS 5 iterations, starting with version 5.0.1, launched on May 19, 2025, with the MateBook Pro and Fold PCs launch after the Huawei Pura X, the first phone to launch with full pre-installation of HarmonyOS 5 on March 20, 2025. The beta program was also launched for 14 devices.

On July 23, 2025, Huawei launched HarmonyOS 5.1 for 30+ compatible devices after the launch of Huawei Watch 5 on May 16, 2025, and the Pura 80 series on June 11, 2025.

On October 22, 2025, Huawei announced HarmonyOS 6 with consumer beta launch after releasing Developer Beta builds since June 20, 2025 at HDC 2025. The Mate 80 series, alongside Mate X7 devices, became the first to launch with HarmonyOS 6 preinstalled on November 25, 2025, with official stable version rollout on eligible models such as the Mate 70 series on the same day in mainland China's markets.

On 7 September 2026, Huawei launched HarmonyOS 7 together with the new Mate XT 2 smartphone. The seventh major release of HarmonyOS was reportedly focused on stronger security and a significant further development in the field of artificial intelligence.

In May 2025, the first notebook with HarmonyOS was launched by Huawei, featuring "HarmonyOS PC", i.e. HarmonyOS 5 for the personal computer form factor.

On November 19, 2025, the first 2-in-1 with HarmonyOS 5.1 was launched by Huawei, with MatePad Edge supporting both tablet mode and full desktop counterpart in line with Huawei MateBook PC line.

On November 5, 2026, Huawei announced its first desktop PC to run HarmonyOS. It features a Kirin X90 CPU and other components made entirely in China.

== Features ==
=== User interface ===
The HarmonyOS interface is overhauled with native HarmonyOS Design system as "Harmonious aesthetics" philosophy by Yang Zhiyan, Chief UX Designer at Huawei Consumer BG or the native launcher system that has an emphasis on 'vivid' system colours and reflective 'spatial' visual of light, blur, glow with glassmorphism and neumorphism soft UI that is a medium between skeuomorphism and flat design. In addition to standard folders that require tapping on them to display their contents, folders can be enlarged to always show their contents without text labels directly on the home screen.

Apps can support "snippets", which expose a portion of the app's functionality (such as a media player's controls, or a weather forecast) via an iOS style pop-up window by swiping left after holding the app icon in context menu, and can be pinned to the home screen as a widget. Apps and services can provide cards; as of HarmonyOS 3.0, cards can also be displayed as widgets with different sizes and shapes to adapt to the home screen layout, and can also be stacked.

The user interface font of HarmonyOS on HarmonyOS Next base is HarmonyOS Sans. It is designed to be easy to read, unique, and universal. The system font was used throughout the operating system alongside previous Android-based EMUI 12 and up, including third-party HarmonyOS and former Android apps.

=== Applications ===
Devices come with applications preinstalled. Further apps can be downloaded from the Huawei App Gallery. From HarmonyOS 1 to 4, the OS was heavily based on Android. This allowed the vast majority of Android apps to be used. Since the introduction of HarmonyOS 5 and further versions such as HarmonyOS 6, only native apps are available. As of March 2026, there were over 350,000 apps available.

=== Software ===
==== Traditional apps ====
Unlike Atomic Services that are installation-free, traditional apps need installation. They are available to users through Huawei AppGallery, which serves as the application store for HarmonyOS with HarmonyOS-native apps. HarmonyOS-native apps have access to capabilities such as distributed communications and cards.

==== Atomic Services ====
Managed and distributed by Huawei Ability Gallery, Meta Services (also known as Atomic Services) replaces legacy HarmonyOS 4.x JS rpk file format Quick Apps are lightweight and consist of one or more HarmonyOS Ability Packages (HAPs) to implement specific convenient services, providing users with dynamic content and functionality. They are accessible via the Service Center from devices, and presented as cards that can be added to a favorite list or pinned to the home screen.

Atomic Services are installation-free since the accompanying code is downloaded in the background. They can also be synchronized across multiple devices, such as updating the driver's location on the watch in real time after the user hails a taxi on the mobile phone.

==== Service Collaboration Kit ====
The Service Collaboration Kit (SCK) provides users with cross-device interaction, allowing them to use the camera, scanning, and gallery functions of other devices. For example, tablets or 2-in-1 laptops can utilize these features from a connected smartphone. To utilize these features, both devices running HarmonyOS NEXT must be logged into the same Huawei account and have WLAN and Bluetooth enabled.

==== Harmony Intelligence ====
Harmony Intelligence allows users to deploy AI-based applications on HarmonyOS, using PanGu 5.0 LLM and its embedded variants, alongside new Celia capabilities, HiAI Foundation Kit, MindSpore Lite Kit, Neural Network Runtime Kit, and Computer Vision. These features improve performance, reduce power consumption, and enable efficient AI processing on devices with Kirin chips.

==== Compatibility layer utility apps ====
HarmonyOS 5 native utility compatibility applications supported and co-developed by Chinese software partners with Huawei controlled compatibility environment such as EasyAbroad for Chinese travellers abroad and DroiTong enable Android apps to run in emulation inside a separate container which is introduced since HarmonyOS NEXT/5.x+ versions no longer natively support Android framework with APKs built from LXC and Huawei's iSula/iSulad openEuler containerised technology engines respectively integrated with LXC ABI shim interacting with HongMeng Kernel's Linux ABI/API shim module as binary compatible. The compatibility utility apps includes cloud data syncing support that enables Android app migration into the Android container utility apps from heavily modified Android 12-13 HarmonyOS 4.x/EMUI system container image tied to Huawei account. Apps downloaded via DroiTong and EasyAbroad are automatically placed into a dedicated folder on the home screen. Since HarmonyOS 6.0.0.115 build, they both can now have applications outside of the folder coexisting with native applications on the home screen and on the application center which is the system's app launcher since HarmonyOS 6.0.0.112 semi-beta and stable build. The compatibility layer utility apps are listed on AppGallery and once they become officially native on the HarmonyOS Next iterations of the HarmonyOS 5.x+ platform, the APK is automatically removed.

Unlike previous versions of HarmonyOS, Android applications are no longer compatible and cannot be downloaded from the store. Large numbers of western apps are therefore not available natively. Yet, applications such as Easy Abroad and DroiTong do allow Android apps to run in emulation inside a separate container. Apps downloaded via DroiTong are automatically placed into a dedicated folder on the home screen. This includes leading apps such as Amazon, ChatGPT, Facebook, Netflix, YouTube. While these apps work, there are issues present with missed notifications, lower resolution, and file transfers in and out of the container. Apps not present include major banking apps, most streaming services, alternative mapping solutions such as Waze as well as some Google services such as Google Assistant and Gemini. Most major Chinese apps are also available, but most Chinese games are still missing.

Status of Major Android Apps in HarmonyOS Next
Available natively	Available in container	Not available	Sources
Alipay; AutoNavi (Gaode Map); Celia; DingTalk; Ele.me; Genshin Impact; iQIYI; JD.com; Lark; Meituan; Microsoft SwiftKey; NBA; QQ Music; QQ Reading; TikTok (Douyin); RedNote (Xiaohongshu); Taobao; WeChat (Weixin); Weibo; WPS Office	Airbnb; Amazon; ChatGPT; Deliveroo; Discord; Disney+; Doordash; Dropbox; Facebook; Gmail; Google Chrome; Google Docs; Google Drive; Google Maps; Google Search; Google Sheets; Instagram; Just Eat; Messenger; Netflix; Reddit; Signal; Spotify; Starbucks; Steam; Telegram; Uber; Uber Eats; WhatsApp; WhatsApp Business; X (Twitter); YouTube	Amazon Prime Video; Apple TV+; Bank of America; BankID; BNP Paribas; Chase; Citi; Crédit Agricole; Discovery+; ESPN+; Gemini; Google Assistant; HBO Max; HSBC; Hulu; MGM+; JioHotstar; Mitsubishi UFJ; Paramount+; Peacock; SMBC; Waze	

For HarmonyOS computer system side powered with Kirin X series silicon custom AArch64 PC chips, there is a virtual machine application on HarmonyOS called Oseasy and KaiMaster/Armor Master built on Huawei's openEuler virtualisation technology stack StratoVirt that enables users to run Windows 11 ARM in a virtual environment on Huawei MateBook PCs and MatePad Edge.

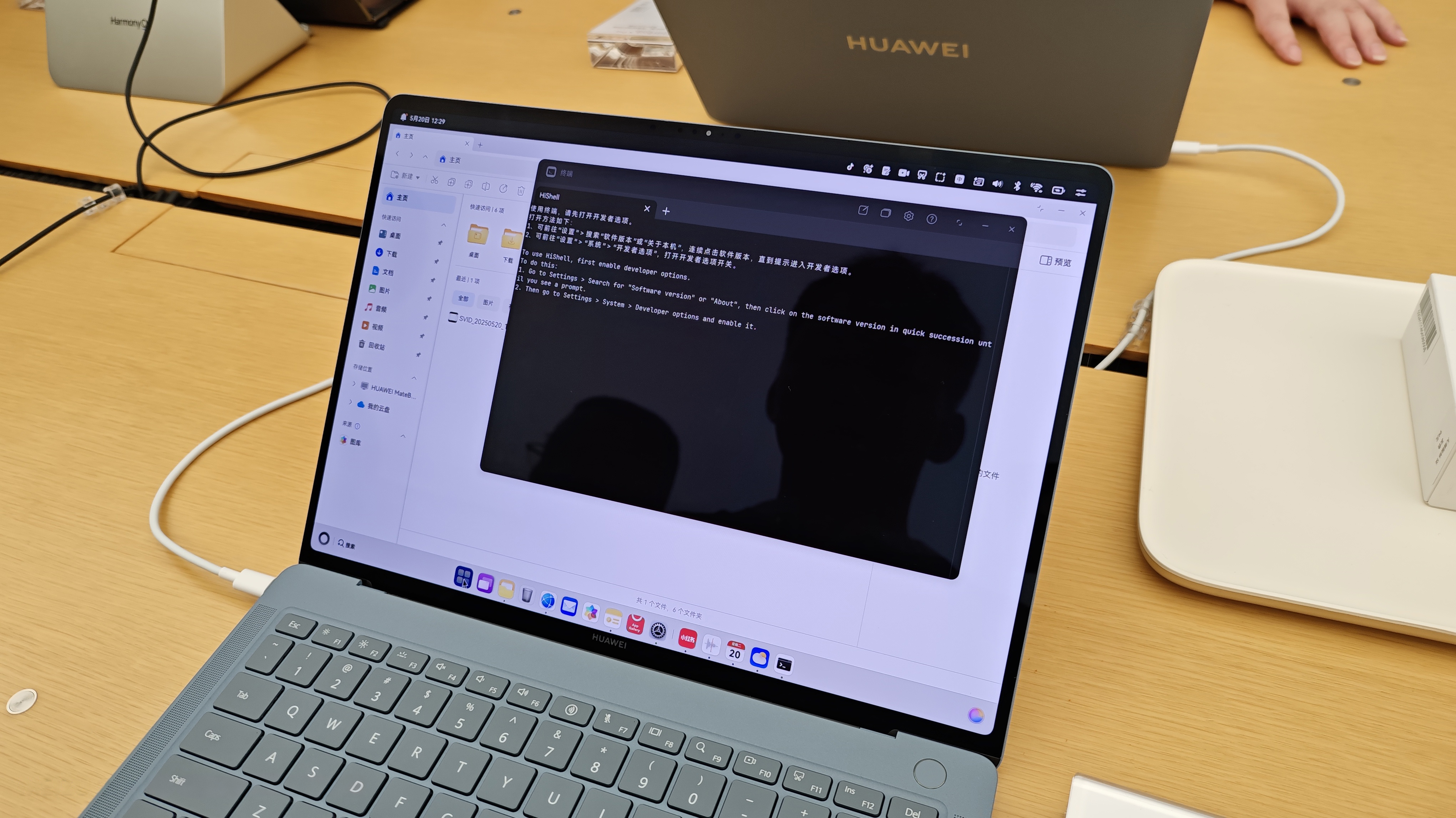
HiShell default terminal on HarmonyOS computer system

HiSH, Harmonix, Termony third-party console applications by open source HarmonyOS developer community based on harmony-qemu FOSS project built for pure single framework OpenHarmony-based HarmonyOS platform that supports QEMU virtualization adaptations natively that can enable users to run full Linux console applications and commands alongside the integration of HarmonyOS computer's default HiShell system terminal.

==== HarmonyOS computer system ====
===== HiShell system terminal =====
HiShell system terminal built on HarmonyOS PC system is based on the OpenHarmony kernel which supports commonly used debugging commands with platform native commands. Commands can be added and customized to the shell of the OpenHarmony kernel. A thin Linux-ish layer is also created for some replicated Linux-style commands out of the box from OpenHarmony's supported reimplementation of third-party Toybox command line and musl to provide POSIX like functionalities as a compatibility layer with HongMeng kernel Linux API/ABI module for developers. However, the shell functions does not comply with the POSIX compliance standards and are used only for debugging. Since HarmonyOS 6, HiShell can be used without Developer option system settings.

Huawei launched the Converged Development Engine, also known as Fusion Development Engine, a lightweight virtualization tool available on AppGallery for HarmonyOS 6.1 computers based on StratoVirt. It allows developers to run the Linux-based openEuler server operating system environment directly on HarmonyOS PCs with a one‑click startup, supporting most Linux-based command‑line tools, TUI applications, and services integrated with native HiShell openEuler CLI terminal feature that can be used alongside to run with native apps such as CodeArts IDE, RDP clients as host and browsers with noVNC web client or localhost as well as Android containerized environments with DroiTong and EasyAbroad utility apps. The engine includes a shared folder for data exchange, snapshot backup to prevent data loss, and disk expansion to avoid storage bottlenecks.

===== CodeArts =====
Huawei CodeArts IDE is a cloud computing–based lightweight web IDE that enables users to access the environment using a browser to complete coding, build and debugging functionality for Python and Java development as well as enterprise Android app development. The program can be downloaded from the AppGallery.

===== DevEco Studio =====
Huawei DevEco Studio is the official native integrated development environment to create native HarmonyOS universal HAP applications on PC system of HarmonyOS 6 accessed via AppGallery. Third-party native applications built on the official native IDE can be distributed via AppGallery app store with Huawei developer ID account. The IDE provides a suite of tools for HarmonyOS app development, including cross-platform ArkUI-X framework for Android, iOS and Web development, that includes real-time UI previews, ARM-based emulator, debugging, performance profiling, and flexible build options with ArkCompiler high level programming languages like ArkTS and Cangjie as well as BiSheng for native C/C++ codes on the native toolchain.

=== Super Device ===
HarmonyOS supports cross-platform interactions between supported devices via the "Super Device" interface; devices are paired via a "radar" screen by dragging icons to the centre of the screen. Examples of Super Device features include allowing users to play back media saved inside a smartphone through a paired PC, smart TV or speakers; share PC screen recordings back to a smartphone; run multiple phone apps in a PC window; share files between a paired smartphone and PC; share application states between the paired devices, etc.

=== NearLink ===
Incorporated into HarmonyOS 4, NearLink (previously known as SparkLink) is a set of standards that combine the strengths of traditional wireless technologies like Bluetooth and Wi-Fi, while emphasizing improved performance in areas like response time, energy efficiency, signal range, and security. It consists of two access modes: SparkLink Low Energy (SLE) and SparkLink Basic (SLB). SLE is designed for low-power consumption, low-latency, and high-reliability applications, with a data transmission rate reportedly up to 6 times that of Bluetooth; SLB is tailored for high-speed, high-capacity, and high-precision applications, with a data transmission rate reportedly around 2 times that of Wi-Fi.

=== File system ===
The file system reportedly employs a combining distributed file storage for the distributed file system called Harmony Distributed File System (HMDFS), local storage and integrated cloud storage services, presenting a single, streamlined space to the user. This design is intended to reduce complexity and improve ease of use. HarmonyOS PC system perform continuous, automated background optimization and clean-up of temporary or redundant files and faster boot times compared to the competition. Huawei has stated this integrated functionality aims to eliminate the user's need for third-party system optimization or disk acceleration tools without the need for defragmentation. Also, it has a built-in anti-virus scanner on Files application for PC system on HarmonyOS 6. The operating system utilize the EROFS (Enhanced Read-Only File System) for critical system partitions. It is claimed to have significant performance and efficiency gains over the Linux-standard EXT4 file system, including read performance, space saving of approximately 1.6GB on system files due to its high-performance compression. The file manager is designed with a simplified, card-based interface reminiscent of modern Windows 11, Android and classic HarmonyOS 4.x tablets on PC side alongside mobile side, prioritizing quick access and clear visual management of files for ease of use when operating.

It also features 'Network Neighbor' functionality, which supports access to shared files of other devices in the LAN network such as other computers and NAS storage devices etc. on HarmonyOS 5.0.1 PC system side post launch. The feature has been expanded to the tablet system side on HarmonyOS 6.

== Hardware ==
HarmonyOS platform was not designed for a single device at the beginning but developed as a distributed operating system for various devices with memory sizes ranging from 128KB to over 4GB. Hence, the hardware requirements are flexible for the operating system and it may only need 128KB of memory for a variety of smart terminal devices.

== Devices ==
Harmony OS largely powers Huawei devices. This includes current smartphones, tablets, laptops, and smartwatches.

The following current devices use Harmony OS with the HarmonyOS microkernel instead of the Linux kernel.

Smartphones	Release date
Huawei Mate 70 series Pioneer SKU	26 November 2024
Huawei Mate X6 Pioneer SKU	26 November 2024
Huawei Pura X	20 March 2025
Huawei nova 14 series	19 May 2025
Huawei Pura 80 series	11 June 2025
Huawei Mate XTs Ultimate	29 September 2025
Huawei nova Flip S	17 October 2025
Huawei nova 14 Lite/Vitality series (China SKU)	17 October 2025
Huawei Mate 70 Air	13 November 2025
Huawei Mate 80 series	25 November 2025
Huawei Mate X7	25 November 2025
Huawei Nova 15 series	22 December 2025
Huawei Mate 80 Pro Max Wind Edition (China SKU)	23 March 2026
Huawei Enjoy 90 series	23 March 2026

Other Devices	Release date
Huawei MatePad Pro 13.2 2025 (2024) Pioneer SKU	26 November 2024
Huawei Watch Fit 4 series	15 May 2025
Huawei Watch 5 series	15 May 2025
Huawei MateBook Pro 2025	19 May 2025
Huawei MateBook Fold	19 May 2025
Huawei HM940 (Qingyun Enterprise)	19 May 2025
Huawei MatePad Pro 12.2 (China SKU)	24 July 2025
Huawei MatePad 11.5 S (China SKU)	15 August 2025
Huawei Mate TV series	4 September 2025
Huawei MatePad Mini	4 September 2025
Huawei Watch GT 6 series	19 September 2025
Huawei Watch Ultimate 2	19 September 2025
Huawei MatePad Edge	25 November 2025
Huawei Watch Ultimate Design Purple Gold Edition	25 November 2025
Huawei FreeBuds Pro 5	25 November 2025
Huawei X3 Pro router series	25 November 2025
Huawei HM740 (Qingyun Enterprise)	11 December 2025

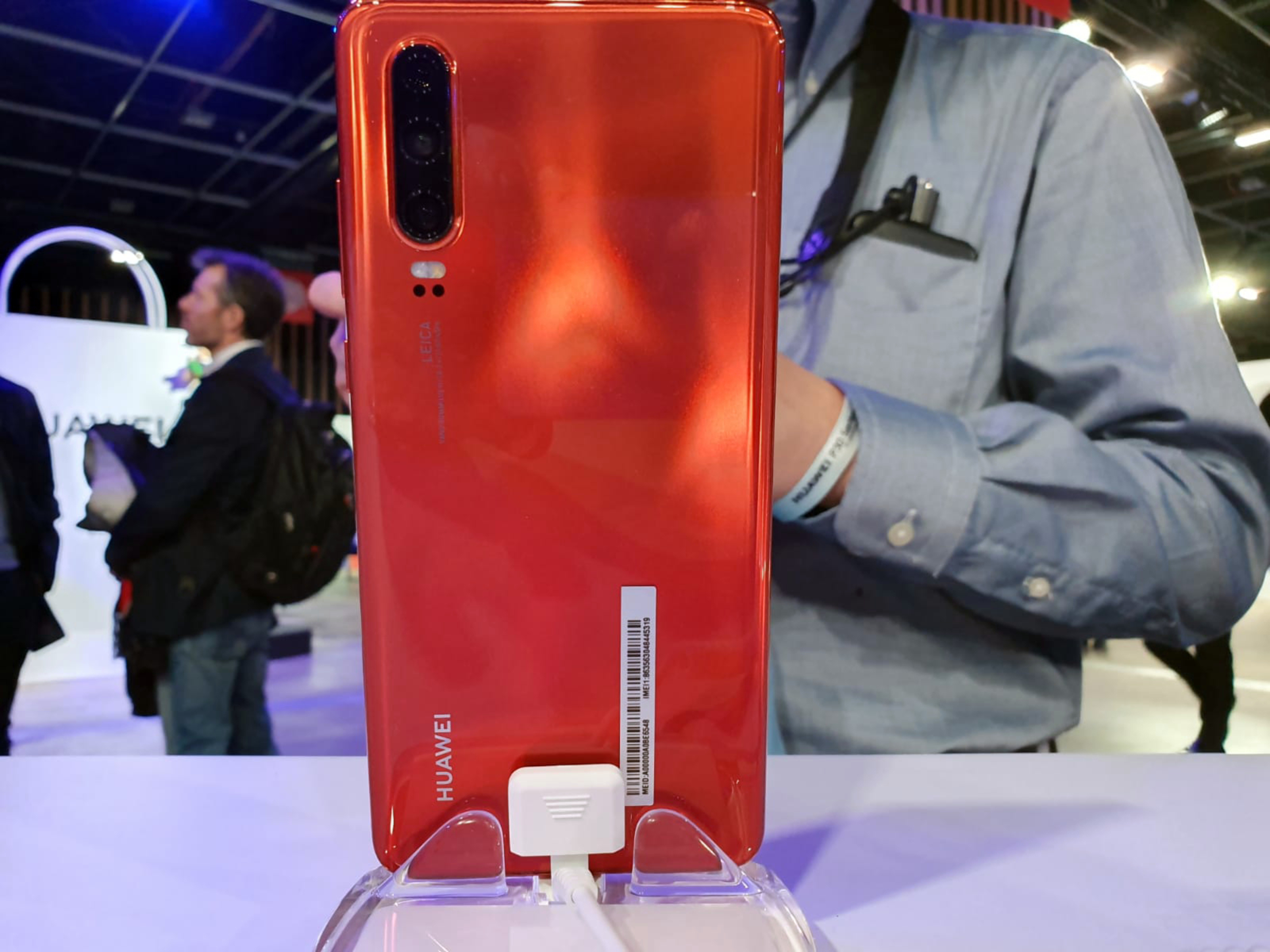
The Huawei P30 is one of several Huawei devices to run HarmonyOS.

Huawei stated that HarmonyOS would initially be used on devices targeting the Chinese market. The company's former subsidiary brand, Honor, unveiled the Honor Vision line of smart TVs as the first consumer electronics devices to run HarmonyOS in August 2019. The HarmonyOS 2.0 beta launched on 16 December 2020 and supported the P30 series, P40 series, Mate 30 series, Mate 40 series, P50 series, and the MatePad Pro.

Stable HarmonyOS 2.0 was released for smartphones and tablets as updates for the P40 and Mate X2 in June 2021. New Huawei Watch, MatePad Pro and PixLab X1 desktop printer models shipping with HarmonyOS were also unveiled at the time. In October 2021, HarmonyOS 2.0 had over 150 million users.

On November 25, 2025, at a Huawei press conference for the Mate 80 series and Mate X7 flagship products, it was announced that devices running HarmonyOS 5 and HarmonyOS 6 has passed 27 million in activations altogether with an install base growing at 100,000 per day.

== Development ==
=== Architecture ===
HarmonyOS is designed with a layered architecture, which consists of four layers; the kernel layer at the bottom provides the upper three layers, i.e., the system service layer, framework layer and application layer, with basic kernel capabilities, such as process and thread management, memory management, file system, network management, and peripheral management.

The kernel layer incorporates a subsystem that accommodates HongMeng Kernel based on microkernel as Rich Executed Environment (REE), catering to diverse smart devices. Depending on the device type, different kernels can be selected; for instance, like OpenHarmony base itself but with a single kernel, lightweight systems are chosen for low-power devices like watches and IoT devices to execute lightweight HarmonyOS apps, whereas large-memory devices like mobile phones, tablets, and PCs utilize standard system. The dual-app framework was replaced with a single-app framework in HarmonyOS Next, supporting only native HarmonyOS apps with APP format.

The system includes a communication base called DSoftBus for integrating physically separate devices into a virtual Super Device, allowing one device to control others and sharing data among devices with distributed communication capabilities. "To address security concerns" arising from varying devices, the system provides a hardware-based Trusted Execution Environment (TEE) microkernel to prevent leakage of sensitive personal data when they are stored or processed.

It supports several forms of apps, including native apps that can be installed from AppGallery, installation-free Quick apps and lightweight Meta Services accessible by users on various devices.

=== Android fork ===
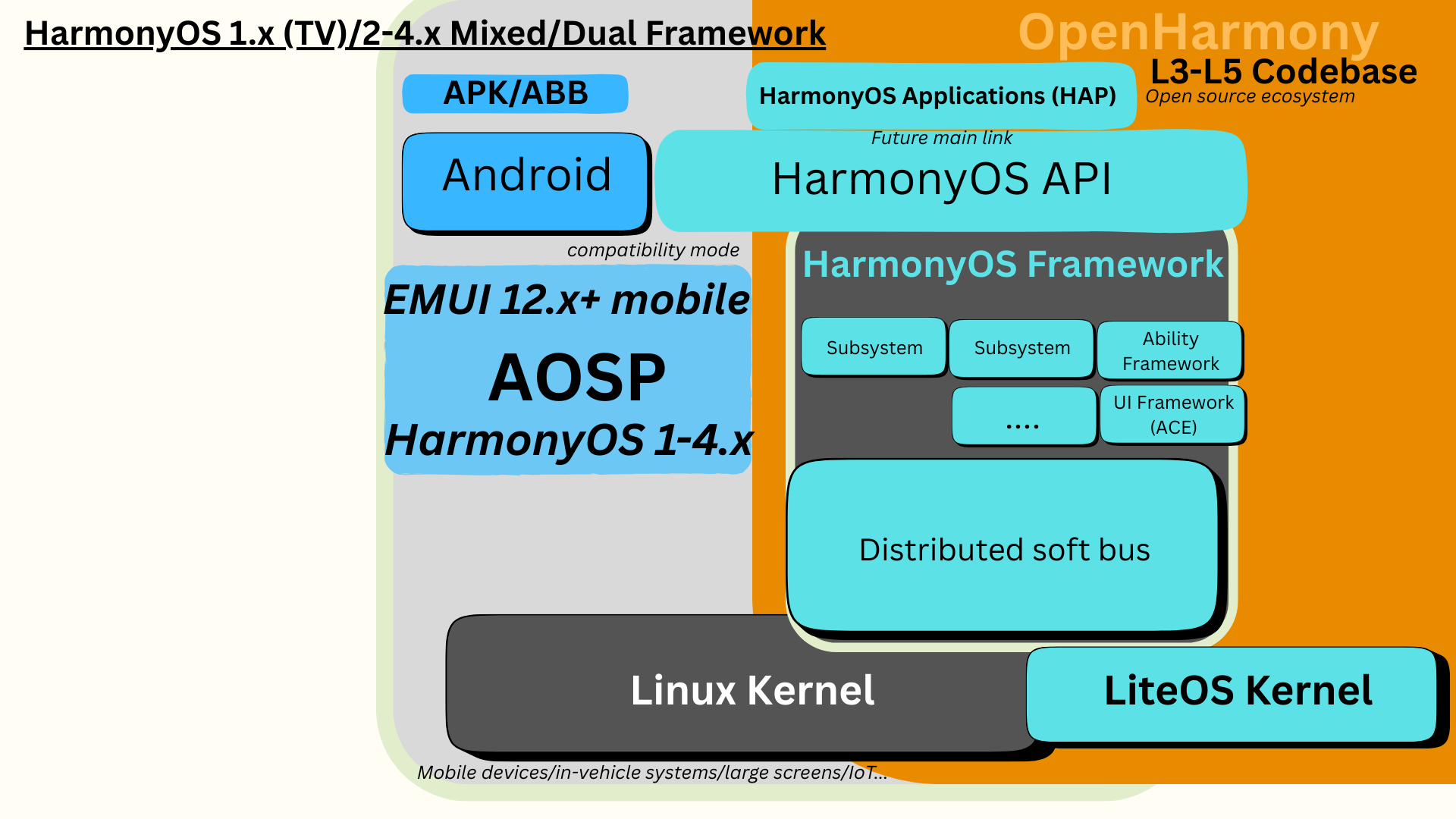
HarmonyOS Dual/Mixed Framework Diagram

When it launched the operating system, Huawei stated that HarmonyOS plans to become a microkernel-based, distributed OS that was completely different from Android and iOS in terms of target market towards Internet of things. A Huawei spokesperson subsequently stated that HarmonyOS supported multiple kernels and used a Linux kernel if a device had a large amount of RAM, and that the company had taken advantage of a large number of third-party open-source resources, including Linux kernel with POSIX-like APIs on OpenHarmony base, as a foundation to accelerate the development of its unified system stack as a future-proof, microkernel-based, and distributed OS running on multiple devices.

At its launch as an operating system for smartphones in 2021, HarmonyOS was, however, rumored by Ars Technica to be a "rebranded version of Android and EMUI" with nearly "identical code bases". Following the release of the HarmonyOS 2.0 beta, Ars Technica and XDA Developers suggested that "the smartphone version of the OS had been forked from Android 10". Ars Technica alleged that it resembled the existing EMUI software used on Huawei devices, but with all references to "Android" replaced by "HarmonyOS". It was also noted that the DevEco Studio software based on JetBrains open source IntelliJ IDEA IDE "shared components and tool chains" with Android Studio.

When testing the new MatePad Pro in June 2021, Android Authority and The Verge similarly observed similarities in "behavior", including that it was possible to install apps from Android APK files on the HarmonyOS-based tablet, and to run the Android 10 easter egg apk app, reaffirming earlier rumor mills.

In December 2022, some Chinese users discovered that, after switching the language to English in HarmonyOS 3.0, the "System" app would display as "Android System," which once again sparked controversy. Huawei subsequently released an urgent patch to remove the reference to Android.

=== Relationship with OpenEuler ===
In terms of architecture, HarmonyOS has close relationship with OpenEuler, which is a community edition of EulerOS, as they have implemented the sharing of kernel technology as revealed by Deng Taihua, President of Huawei's Computing Product Line. The sharing is reportedly to be strengthened in the future in the areas of the distributed software bus, system security, app framework, device driver framework and new programming language.

=== Relationship with OpenHarmony ===
OpenHarmony is an open-source version of HarmonyOS donated by Huawei to the OpenAtom Foundation, built around its unique multiple-kernel architecture of the distributed operating system, sharing some principles from Huawei LiteOS lineage. It supports devices running a mini system such as printers, speakers, smartwatches and any other smart device with memory as small as 128 KB, or running a standard system with memory greater than 128 MB. The open-source operating system contains the basic capabilities of HarmonyOS and does not depend on the Android Open Source Project (AOSP) code.

=== HarmonyOS NEXT ===
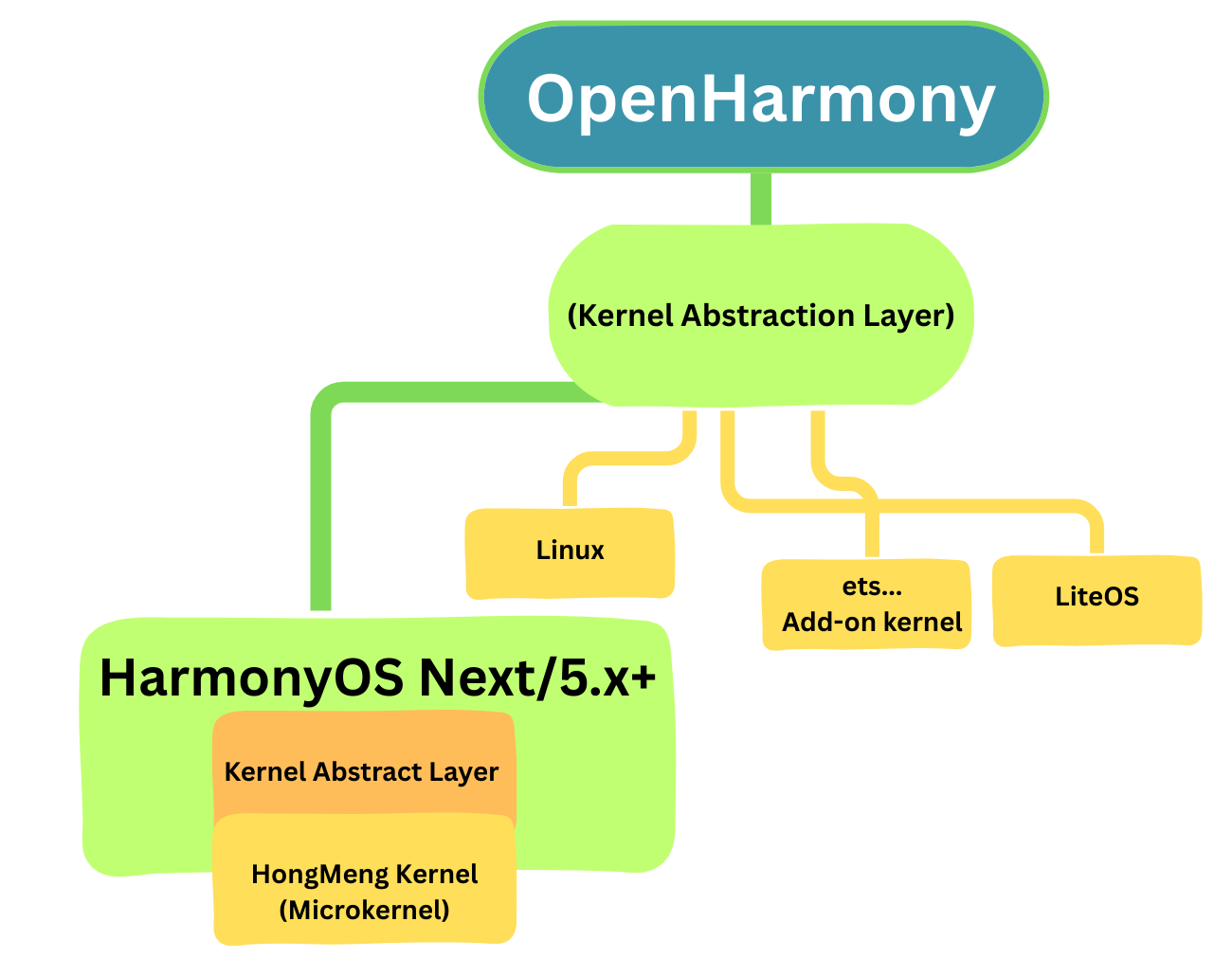
HarmonyOS NEXT/5.x+ architecture

On August 4, 2023, at Huawei Developers Conference 2023 (HDC), Huawei officially announced HarmonyOS NEXT (HarmonyOS 5), the next iteration system version of HarmonyOS, supporting only native APP apps via Ark Compiler, and ending the support for Android apk apps.

Built on a custom version of OpenHarmony, HarmonyOS NEXT proprietary system has the HarmonyOS microkernel at its core with a single framework currently since HarmonyOS 5 version and up, departing from the common Linux kernel and replaced multi-kernel HarmonyOS.

Among the first batch of over 200 developers, McDonald's and KFC in China became two of the first multinational food companies to adopt HarmonyOS Next.

== App development ==
The primary IDE known as DevEco Studio for developing HarmonyOS apps was released by Huawei on September 9, 2020, based on IntelliJ IDEA and Huawei's SmartAssist. The IDE includes DevEco Device Tool, an integrated development tool for customizing HarmonyOS components, coding, compiling and visual debugging, similar to other third party IDEs such as Visual Studio Code for Windows, Linux and macOS.

HarmonyOS uses App Pack files suffixed with .app, also known as APP files, for distribution of software via AppGallery. Each App Pack has one or more HarmonyOS Ability Packages (HAP) containing code for their abilities, resources, libraries, and a JSON file with configuration information.

HarmonyOS as a universal single IoT platform allows developers to write apps once and run everywhere across devices such as phones, tablets, personal computers, TVs, cars, smartwatches, single board computers under OpenHarmony, and screen-less IoT devices such as smart speakers.

As of December 2025, there were reportedly over 10 million registered developers participated in developing HarmonyOS apps.

=== ArkUI ===
ArkUI
- Developer: Huawei
- Release: October 22, 2021
- Operating system: HarmonyOS, OpenHarmony, Oniro
- Type: Software framework
- License: open source, Apache License
- Website: https://developer.harmonyos.com/en/develop/arkUI

Applications for HarmonyOS are mostly built using components of ArkUI, a Declarative User Interface framework. ArkUI is a declarative based user interface framework for building user interfaces on native HarmonyOS, OpenHarmony alongside Oniro applications developed by Huawei for the ArkTS and Cangjie programming language, alongside C/C++ applications with ArkUI's XComponent.

ArkUI elements are adaptable to various devices and include new interface rules with automatic updates along with HarmonyOS updates.

ArkUI 3.0 is declarative in eTS (extended TypeScript) in HarmonyOS 3.0, followed by main ArkTS programming language in HarmonyOS 3.1, contrasting with the imperative syntax used in Java development in earlier versions of HarmonyOS in HarmonyOS 1.0 and 2.0. ArkUI allows for 2D drawing as well as 3D drawing, animations, event handling, Service Card widgets, and data binding. ArkUI automatically synchronizes between UI views and data.

ArkUI integrates with DevEco Studio IDE to provide for real-time previews during editing, alongside support for debugging and other development features.

ArkJS is designed for web development with a Vue 2-like syntax, providing a familiar environment for web developers using JS and CSS. ArkJS incorporates the HarmonyOS Markup Language (HML), which allows attributes prefixed with @ for MVVM architectural pattern.

==== History ====
During HDC 2021 on October 22, 2021, the HarmonyOS 3.0 developer preview introduced ArkUI 3.0 for eTS, JS programming languages with ArkCompiler. Compared to previous versions of ArkUI 1.0 and 2.0 under imperative development with Java in earlier versions of HarmonyOS.

During HDC 2022 HarmonyOS 3.1 in November 2022, Huawei ArkUI evolved into full declarative development featuring declarative UI capabilities, improved layout ability, component capability improvement and others. In April 2023, HarmonyOS 3.1 Beta 1 build included ArkUI declarative 2D and 3D drawing capabilities. The upgrade also improves layout, component, and app state management capabilities.

During HDC 2023, August 2023, Huawei announced HarmonyOS 4.0 improvements of ArkUI with ArkTS alongside native HarmonyOS NEXT software development using Ark Engine with ArkGraphics 2D and ArkGraphics 3D. Also, the company announced a cross platform extension of ArkUI called ArkUI-X which would allow developers to run applications across Android, iOS and HarmonyOS under one project using DevEco Studio IDE and Visual Studio Code plugins. On January 18, 2024, during HarmonyOS Ecology Conference, Huawei revealed the HarmonyOS NEXT software stack, that included ArkUI and cross-platform variant ArkUI-X UI framework with the core primary in-house Ark Compiler backend and Ark Runtime with primary ArkTS language while both LLVM-based backend derived compilers of in-house BiSheng Compiler for NDK (Native Development Kit) development of C/C++ NAPI applications alongside in-house Cangjie programming language with Cangjie compiler that includes Cangjie runtime. Cangjie programming language sits in the middle between C/C++ and ArkTS as a high level native language.

Maleoon API is an upcoming self-developed low-level graphics API for HarmonyOS 6.x versions announced at HDC 2025 that will coexist with cross-platform industry standards Khronos OpenGL and Vulkan graphic APIs, that aims to be a data-driven, structured API, improving rendering efficiency in a heterogenous hardware and AI software paradigm shift with GPU pooling of devices for end-to-end collaborative rendering, end-to-cloud where devices act as virtual graphic cards to boost rendering and fidelity that are solely optimized and programmable for in-house Maleoon GPUs of Kirin SoC in a vertically integrated ecosystem.

Huawei has formerly introduced WebGE, a next-generation graphics rendering technology for mini-games that implements the cross-platform WebGPU API standard within the mini-game ecosystem exclusive to mainland Chinese mobile games market. This advancement enhances graphical performance and efficiency for lightweight gaming experiences. In performance tests, the adventure mini native web game Dawn Returns achieved a 30% increase in frame rate during real-time 3D lighting and shadow rendering, along with smoother scene transitions. Similarly, the 3D bullet-shooting mini-game Thunder: Awakening sustained frame rates above 90 FPS with greater stability, while reducing power consumption by approximately 15%. The release of WebGE is designed to enable richer visual effects in mini-games and expand creative possibilities for developers in mini-game design for HarmonyOS 6 platform.

==== ArkUI-X ====
ArkUI-X
- Developer: Huawei
- Release: December 8, 2023
- Operating system: Android, iOS, OpenHarmony, Oniro, HarmonyOS, Web platform (ArkJS)
- Type: Application framework
- License: Apache License
- Website: developer.harmonyos.com/en/develop/arkUI

ArkUI-X is an open-source UI software development kit which is the extension of ArkUI created for building cross platform applications, including Android, iOS targets additionally. Web platform support with ArkJS was released on December 8, 2023. ArkUI-X consists of both a UI language and a rendering engine.

==== Features ====
The ArkUI architecture is divided into three layers: the top layer offers a declarative UI paradigm; the middle layer consists of the Ark Compiler and runtime, the UI backend engine, and the rendering engine; and the bottom layer serves as the platform adaptation and bridging layer.

System components are built-in components within the ArkUI framework, categorized into container components and basic components. For example, Row and Column are container components that can hold other components, while Text and Button are basic components.

==== Examples ====
The following is an example of a simple Hello World program. It is standard practice in ArkUI to separate the application struct and views into different structs, with the main view named Index.

import ArkTS
// Index.ets

import router from '@ohos.router';

@Entry
@Component
struct Index {
  @State message: string = 'Hello World'

  build() {
    Row() {
      Column() {
        Text(this.message)
          .fontSize(50)
          .fontWeight(FontWeight.Bold)
        // Add a button to respond to user clicks.
        Button() {
          Text('Next')
            .fontSize(30)
            .fontWeight(FontWeight.Bold)
        }
        .type(ButtonType.Capsule)
        .margin({
          top: 20
        })
        .backgroundColor('#0D9FFB')
        .width('40%')
        .height('5%')
        // Bind the onClick event to the Next button so that clicking the button redirects the user to the second page.
        .onClick(() => {
          router.pushUrl({ url: 'pages/Second' })
        })
      }
      .width('100%')
    }
    .height('100%')
  }
}

The @ohos.router routing library implements page transitions, which must be declared in the main_pages.json file before being invoked.

== Related products ==
=== HarmonyOS Connect ===
The HarmonyOS Connect brand is a licensing agreement where third party OEMs can produce, sell and operate products under the HarmonyOS brand, and allows software integration to the Huawei Smart Life app.

=== HarmonyOS Cockpit ===
Designed for use in automobiles, the HarmonyOS Cockpit is designed to allow OEMs to implement their own customized features.

=== MineHarmony OS ===
Launched in 2021, MineHarmony OS (Chinese: 矿鸿; pinyin: Kuànghóng) is a system designed for use in underground coal mining equipment. It provides a user interface for data transmission and analysis.

== Trademarks ==
In May 2019, Huawei applied for registration of the trademark "Hongmeng" through the Chinese Patent Office CNIPA, but the application was rejected in pursuance to Article 30 of the PRC Trade Mark Law, citing the trademark was similar to that of "CRM Hongmeng" in graphic design and "Hongmeng" in Chinese word.

In less than a week before launching HarmonyOS 2.0 and new devices by Huawei, the Beijing Intellectual Property Court announced the first-instance judgement in May 2021 to uphold the decision by CNIPA as the trademark was not sufficiently distinctive in terms of its designated services.

However, it was reported that the trademark had officially been transferred from Huizhou Qibei Technology to Huawei by end of May 2021.

On October 22, 2024, it has been reported that Huawei has applied for registration of more than 400 HarmonyOS related trademarks in China.

== Market share ==
=== Current data ===
Harmony OS had a 5% share of the global mobile operating-system market for the second quarter of 2026; this made HarmonyOS the third largest smartphone operating system worldwide after Android with 75% market share and iOS with 20% market share. In the mainland Chinese mobile market, HarmonyOS was the second largest mobile operating system in the second quarter of 2026 with roughly 24% market share, behind Android (58%) and ahead of iOS (18%).

According to data provider Counterpoint, Huawei recorded its highest quarterly share in the first quarter of 2026 since the fourth quarter of 2020, when the company held 20% of the market and still relied on the Android operating system (before the introduction of HarmonyOS devices in June 2021). In the second quarter of 2026, the HarmonyOS market share then further increased five percentage points to 24%.

For the whole of 2025, based on a yearly average, HarmonyOS was the second largest mobile operating system in the mainland Chinese mobile market with roughly 18% market share, behind Android (67%) and ahead of iOS (15%).

=== Historic data ===
On December 23, 2021, Yu Chengdong, CEO of Huawei Consumer Business Group, claimed that HarmonyOS had reached 300 million smartphones and other smart devices, including 200 million devices in the ecosystem and 100 million third-party consumer products from industry partners.

Market research conducted in China by Strategy Analytics showed that Harmony OS was the third largest smartphone platform after iOS and Android, reaching a record high of 4% market share in China during the first quarter of 2022, up from zero just a year earlier. This increase in market share took place after the operating system was also launched for smartphone devices in June 2021.

The research claimed that in the first quarter of 2022 the platform outgrew its rivals, such as Android and Apple iOS, from a low install base of about 150 million smart devices overall, particularly due to the good support in China and the HarmonyOS software upgrades that Huawei made available for its older handset models and its former sub-brands such as Honor.

On August 8, 2022, after the soft launch of HarmonyOS 3, Sina Finance, part of Sina Corporation, and Huawei Central reported that the number of Huawei HarmonyOS Connect devices had exceeded 470 million units. By summer 2022, 14 OpenHarmony distributions had been launched.

In the third quarter of 2023, HarmonyOS captured a 3% share of the global smartphone market and 13% within China, despite Huawei's limitation to LTE at the time. At the launch of HarmonyOS 4 in August 2023, it was noted that the operating system had been integrated into over 700 million devices. By January 18, 2024, during Huawei's HarmonyOS Ecology Conference in China, this number had risen to over 800 million devices, as reported by Huawei.

In the first quarter of 2024, HarmonyOS reached a 4% market share globally and captured 17% of the Chinese market, surpassing iOS to become the second largest mobile platform domestically, as reported by Counterpoint Research on May 25, 2024. During the HDC 2024 keynote conference, it was announced that HarmonyOS had reached 900 million active users on June 21, 2024.

On October 22, 2024, Huawei announced at its HarmonyOS NEXT 5 event that the HarmonyOS platform had 1 billion active users. In the first quarter of 2025, HarmonyOS increased its market share globally to 5%; it also held 19% of the Chinese market, an increase of 2 percentage points over the same quarter in 2024.

From the second quarter of 2025 to the first quarter of 2026, HarmonyOS maintained a stable global market share at 4% in line with the rest of 2024, as Huawei recovered in Q3 2025 from a short slump in the second quarter during the Pura 80 series era. For 2025, HarmonyOS attained a market share of 18% on average in the mainland Chinese mobile market (a slight increase on 2024), making it the second largest mobile operating system behind Android with, on average, 67% and ahead of iOS at, on average, 15% market share in China, according to Counterpoint.

== Reception ==
- Nanjing's Digital Economy Industry Department Director, Zheng Wei, announced that the city is committed to "fully supporting the HarmonyOS ecosystem and establishing a 'HarmonyOS City'."
- Taobao claims that the ArkUI version of its app achieves checkout page performance 1.5 times faster than the Android version.

== See also ==
- Comparison of mobile operating systems
- OpenHarmony
- HarmonyOS 5
- EulerOS
- Flutter
- LiteOS
- DevEco Studio
- Jetpack Compose
- .NET Multi-platform App UI
- Qt (software)
- React Native
- SwiftUI
- Xiaomi HyperOS
- BlueOS
- Android
- Microsoft Windows
