= Huawei Pura X =

2025 Huawei foldable smartphone

Huawei Pura X is a foldable smartphone launched by Huawei. The device was officially released on March 20, 2025, with pre-orders beginning the same day and official sales starting on March 30.

== Design ==
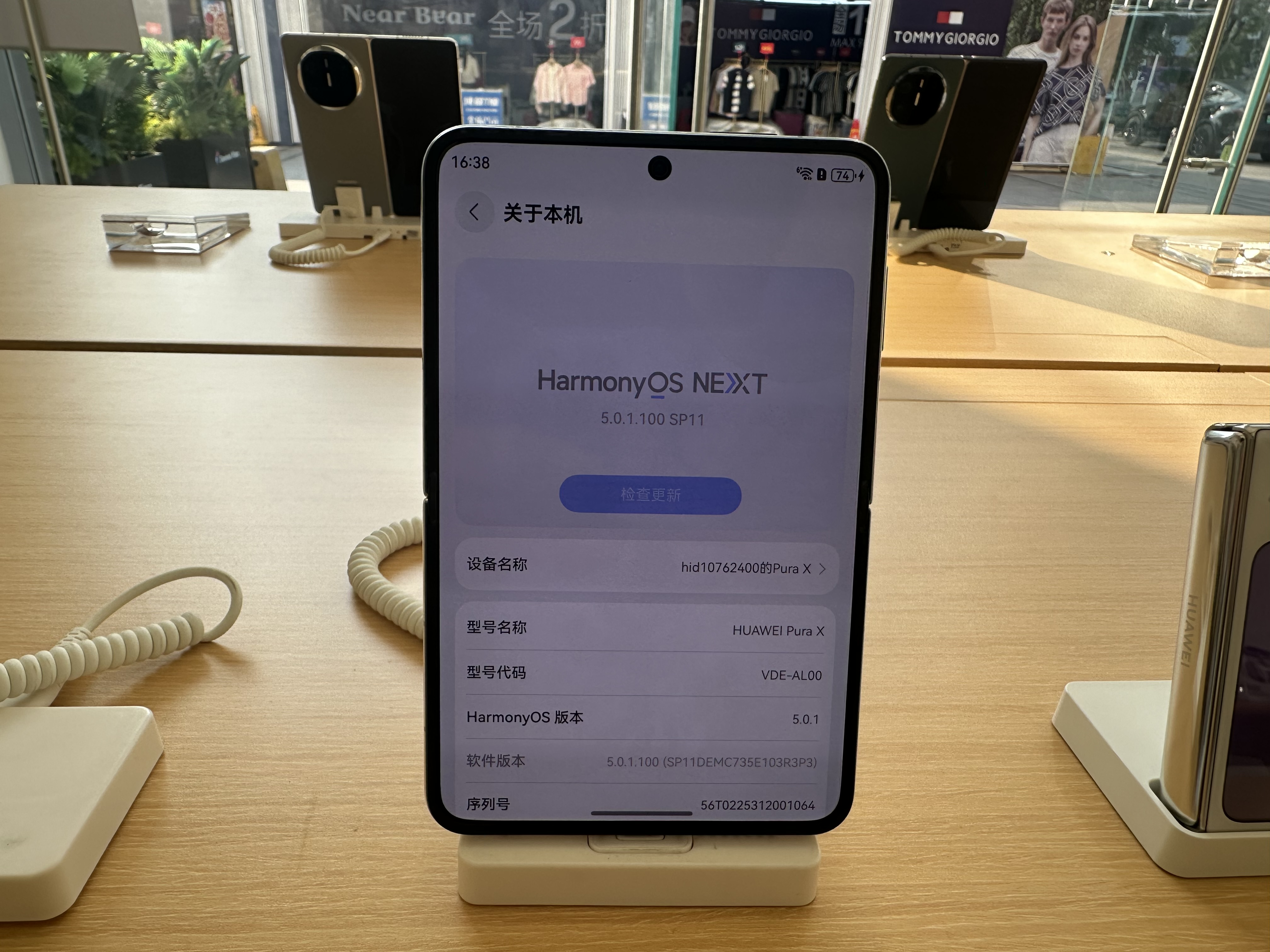
The About page of Pura X

=== Hardware ===
Huawei Pura X uses a vertical folding design, officially named “wide folding” (Chinese: 阔折叠). When unfolded, its inner screen is 6.3 in (160 mm) with a 16:10 aspect ratio and 2120×1320 resolution; when folded, the outer screen is 3.5 in (89 mm) with a 1:1 aspect ratio OLED display.

The phone features a Xuanwu water-drop hinge design, covered with UTG glass, with thickness reduced by 36% compared to previous generation foldable devices, and supports IPX8 water resistance. For battery life, it uses a 4720mAh high-silicon anode battery, supporting 66W wired fast charging, 40W wireless charging, and 5W reverse charging.

=== Software ===
Pura X is the first phone to launch pre-installed with HarmonyOS (Chinese: 鸿蒙), Huawei's new home-grown OS family, (not to be confused with the legacy EMUI versions of HarmonyOS which were Android-based).

While it does not run Android, it includes DroiTong (Chinese: 卓易通) and EasyAbroad (Chinese: 出境易), "containers" that can emulate Android apps, allowing them to be run alongside native HarmonyOS apps. (The former is for Chinese domestic apps, and the latter is for use outside of China, featuring several Google apps and others not available within China.)

Usability-wise, Pura X features AI eye-tracked page turning, automatically turning the page when the reader's eye lingers on the bottom edge of the display.

It also can run several apps (including the web browser) on the small external screen.

Within its Celia AI assistant app, it also supports both PanGu and DeepSeek.

== Controversy ==
In early 2025, Richard Yu, CEO of Huawei Consumer Business Group, revealed in a livestream that Huawei was about to release a product that “all Chinese people can afford and never expected”. On March 20, Huawei released Pura X with a starting price of 7,499 yuan, sparking widespread debate and criticism over its high price, unattractive design, and lack of innovation on Chinese social media. Yu responded in a livestream that the new product has high costs, admitting he “speaks imprecisely and has low emotional intelligence”, and that “everyone catches my small mistakes and flaws to criticize me harshly”. Regarding criticism of the product, he would “humbly accept everyone's opinions and improve promptly”.
