= Huawei MatePad T8 =

2020 Tablet

- Brand: Huawei
- Manufacturer: Huawei
- Type: Tablet computer
- Series: Huawei MatePad
- First released: May 2020; 5 years ago
- Compatible networks: GSM, HSDPA, LTE
- Dimensions: 121.1×199.7×8.55 mm (4.768×7.862×0.337 in)
- Weight: 310 g (11 oz)
- Operating system: Android 10 with EMUI 10
- CPU: MediaTek MT8768
- GPU: PowerVR GE8320
- Memory: 2 GB LPDDR4
- Storage: 16 GB / 32 GB
- Removable storage: microSD, up to 512 GB
- Battery: 5100 mAh
- Charging: 5-watt standard charging
- Rear camera: 5 MP, AF
- Front camera: 2 MP
- Display: 8.0 inches, 800 × 1280 pixels
- Connectivity: Wi-Fi 802.11 a/b/g/n/ac, dual-band, Wi-Fi Direct, hotspot Bluetooth 5.0, A2DP, LE
- Other: Accelerometer, GPS, A-GPS, GLONASS

The Huawei MatePad T8 is a tablet computer that is manufactured by Huawei.

The tablet was introduced in Europe on May 6, 2020, along with other company devices: the Huawei B535 Wi-Fi router and the Huawei MatePad Pro tablet.

== Specifications ==
=== Design & hardware ===
The tablet features a body made of metal. The back surface of the tablet has a matte finish.

The device has slim bezels (4.9 mm) around the screen, which occupies 76.7% of the front panel. Combined with its low cost, this made it one of the best budget tablets of 2021.

The Huawei MatePad T8 is powered by an octa-core MediaTek MT8768 processor, featuring four Cortex-A53 cores clocked at 2.0 GHz and four Cortex-A53 cores clocked at 1.5 GHz. The graphics processor is a PowerVR GE8320.

Internal storage is available in 16 GB or 32 GB options, with 2 GB of RAM. Storage can be expanded via a microSD card (up to 512 GB).

The Huawei MatePad T8 features a 5 MP main camera (f/2.2 aperture) with autofocus and 1920 × 1080 pixel video recording. The front-facing camera is 2 MP with a fixed focal length.

It includes a non-removable 5100 mAh Li-Po battery, which provides up to 588 hours of stand-by and 12 hours of screen usage. It also comes with a 5-watt standard charging.

=== Software & connectivity ===
The Huawei MatePad T8 runs on the Android 10 operating system with the EMUI 10 User Interface without support of Google Mobile Services.

The tablet supports the following network bands - 2G GSM, 3G WCDMA, and 4G LTE. Wireless interfaces include Wi-Fi 802.11 a/b/g/n/ac (dual-band), Wi-Fi Direct, hotspot, Bluetooth 5.0, A2DP, and LE.

It supports several navigation systems - GPS, A-GPS, and GLONASS. Charging and data transfer are handled via a microUSB 2.0 port with USB On-The-Go support. The tablet does not feature a built-in FM radio or NFC.
