= Huawei Mate X2 =

2021 high-end foldable smartphone from Huawei

- Manufacturer: Huawei
- Type: Foldable phablet
- Series: Mate X
- First released: 25 February 2021; 5 years ago
- Discontinued: July 16, 2022
- Predecessor: Huawei Mate X
- Successor: Huawei Mate Xs 2
- Related: Huawei Mate 40
- Dimensions: Unfolded: 161.8 mm (6.37 in) H 145.8 mm (5.74 in) W 8.2 mm (0.32 in) D Folded: 161.8 mm (6.37 in) H 74.6 mm (2.94 in) W 14.7 mm (0.58 in) D
- Weight: 295 g (10.4 oz)
- Operating system: Android 10, EMUI 11 HarmonyOS 2
- System-on-chip: Kirin 9000 5G (5 nm)
- CPU: Octa-core (1x3.13 GHz Cortex-A77 & 3x2.54 GHz Cortex-A77 & 4x2.05 GHz Cortex-A55)
- GPU: Mali-G78 MP24
- Memory: 8 GB RAM
- Storage: 256 or 512 GB UFS 3.1
- Removable storage: No
- Battery: 4500 mAh lithium polymer
- Charging: 55W Huawei SuperCharge
- Rear camera: 50 MP, f/1.9, 23 mm, (wide), 1/1.28", RYYB, 1.22 μm, omnidirectional PDAF, Laser AF, OIS; 12 MP, f/2.4, 70 mm (telephoto), RYYB, PDAF, OIS, 3× optical zoom; 8 MP, f/4.4, 240 mm (periscope telephoto), PDAF, OIS, 10× optical zoom; 16 MP, f/2.2, 17 mm, AF (Ultrawide)
- Front camera: 16 MP, f/2.2, (wide), 1080p/30 fps video
- Display: 8 in (200 mm) OLED, 2200 × 2480 (~413 ppi density), 90 Hz refresh rate
- External display: 6.45 in (164 mm) OLED, 1160 × 2700 (456 ppi), 90 Hz refresh rate
- Sound: Stereo loudspeakers
- Data inputs: USB-C, fingerprint scanner (side-mounted), accelerometer, gyro, proximity, compass, barometer, color spectrum
- Website: consumer.huawei.com/en/phones/mate-x2/

The Huawei Mate X2 is an Android-based high end foldable smartphone produced by Huawei. The phone, unveiled on 22 February 2021, serves as the successor to the Mate X and Mate Xs. The phone was vastly redesigned from the previous generation, adopting a dual-screen design very similar to the Samsung Galaxy Z Fold 2.

== Design ==
Unlike the Mate X and Mate Xs, the Mate X2 has dual displays: a foldable 8 inch display that is concealed when folded, and a smaller 6.45 inch display on the outside. The display format is very similar to the Samsung Galaxy Z Fold 2, which was released the previous year. The quad-camera array is situated on the back, opposite the second screen, and a selfie camera is present in a cutout in the upper left-hand corner of that smaller display. Unlike the Galaxy Z Fold 2, the Mate X2 lacks a camera on the side of the main screen. The device comes in four colors, Black, White, Light Blue, and Rose Gold.
