= Huawei MatePad Pro =

Android-based tablet developed by Huawei

Huawei MatePad Pro 5G
- Manufacturer: Huawei
- Type: Tablet computer
- Series: Huawei Mate series
- First released: December 12, 2019; 6 years ago
- Related: Huawei Mate 30, Huawei P40, Huawei Mate X
- Dimensions: 246 mm × 159 mm × 7.2 mm (9.69 in × 6.26 in × 0.28 in)
- Weight: 460 g (16 oz)
- Operating system: EMUI 10.1 based on Android 10 (SDK ROM)
- System-on-chip: HiSilicon Kirin 990 5G (7nm+)
- CPU: Octa-core (2×2.26 GHz Cortex-A76 & 2×2.09 GHz Cortex-A76 & 4×1.86 GHz Cortex-A55)
- GPU: Mali-G76 MP16
- Memory: 6 or 8 GB LPDDR4X RAM
- Storage: 128, 256 or 512GB
- Removable storage: Nano Memory, expandable up to 256 GB
- Battery: Non-removable 7,250mA·h Li-Polymer
- Charging: Supports: Fast Charging of up to 40W; Fast Wireless Charging of up to 27W; Reverse Wireless Charging of up to 7.5W
- Rear camera: 13 MP, f/1.8, PDAF, LED flash, HDR, Panorama, video recording of up to 4K@30 fps & 1080p@30fps
- Front camera: 8MP, f/2.0, HDR, video recording of only 1080p@30 fps
- Display: 10.8 in (270 mm), 338.2 cm2 (90% screen-to-body ratio), 2560×1600 capacitive LCD QHD display, 540 nits, 16 million colours, 16:10 aspect ratio, 60 Hz refresh rate
- Sound: 4 channel stereo speakers tuned by Harman Kardon, HiSten's 6.0 3D surround sound, no 3.5mm headphone jack
- Connectivity: GPS, Glonass, BDS, Galileo, QZSS (LTE model only), A-GPS, Wi-Fi 802.11a/b/g/n/ac dual-band with Wi-Fi Direct support, BT5.1, A2DP, LE connections and USB Type C 3.1, Type-C reversible connector, USB On-The-Go, GSM/HSPA/LTE, 2G/GSM 850/900/1800/1900, 3G/HSDPA 850/900/1900/2100, 4G/1/3/4/5/8/19/34/38/39/40/41, connection speed via HSPA, 42, 215 and 76 Mbit/s, LTE-A, as in the marketing name, supports 5G connections
- Data inputs: Multi-touch touchscreen, 5× 360° circumferential microphones, M-Pencil recognition, charging & gestures, accelerometer, gyroscope, compass, proximity sensor
- Model: MRX-ALO9, MRX-AL19, MRX-WO9, MRX-W19
- Website: Huawei MatePad Pro 5G

The Huawei MatePad Pro is an Android-based tablet designed and marketed by Huawei as part of their Huawei Mate series. It was announced on November 25, 2019 and was released on December 12, 2019.

== Specifications ==
=== Hardware ===
==== Chipsets ====
The Huawei MatePad Pro utilizes the Kirin 9000E octa-core processor as its main computational component, that is based on a 5G modem. Huawei has also touted the MatePad Pro as being the first tablet in the world to have 5G. The Kirin 990 CPU provides high performance, whilst conserving battery-life. Additionally, a 7nm+ processing node, based on EUV and FinFET technology, is integrated into the aforementioned CPU. For graphic rendering, the MatePad Pro exploits the Mali G76-MP16 GPU. Moreover, an NPU (Neural Processing Unit) found in the MatePad Pro acts as an artificially intelligent powered processor that further increases the tablet's performance, efficiency, and battery-life.

==== Display ====
According to Huawei, the MatePad Pro has a 10.8 in (270 mm) inch quad high-definition liquid crystal display. The display has the ability to increase its brightness up to 540 nits. Moreover, the display measures 2560×1600 and boasts 16 million colors on a 16:10 aspect ratio. Also, if measured accurately, the screen-to-body ratio measures approximately ~90%, per Huawei's lab tests. Unlike the Samsung Galaxy Note 20 series and Galaxy S21 series, the tablet does not support a 120 Hz refresh rate, rather it utilizes a standard 60 Hz refresh rate.

==== Storage ====
For ROM storage sizes, the MatePad Pro comes in a 128, 256 and 512 GB variant, with Huawei's Proprietary Nano Memory card acting as the second storage option, which can be expanded up to 256 GB. Either 6 or 8 GB of RAM (type LPDDRX4) is available for the MatePad Pro.

==== Batteries ====
All hardware components of the device are powered by a non-removable 7,250mA·h Li-Polymer battery, that can support wireless charging. Also, the tablet is capable of lasting up to 10.8 hours on a single charge.

==== Connectivity ====
Dual-band Wi-Fi with Wi-Fi direct is supported on the device, alongside the specifications for 802.11a/b/g/n/ac networks. In terms of charging, the MatePad Pro can support the following: fast wired charging of up to 40W; wireless charging of up to 27W; and reverse wireless charging of up to 7.5W. The tablet is able to transfer data via a USB-C 3.1 cable, which can be reversed. Along with the standard 2G, 3G and 4G LTE networks, the MatePad Pro can support sub-6 GHz 5G networks. In such networks, the theoretical peak download speed can reach 2.3 Gbit/s, and the theoretical upload speed can reach 1.25 Gbit/s. Additional connections include: GPS; GLONASS; and Bluetooth 5.1.

==== Sensors ====
A standard gyroscope, digital compass, proximity sensor, and an accelerometer are used to measure orientation and direction, navigation, detection of nearby objects, and the measurement of proper acceleration, respectively.

==== Sound ====
No 3.5mm headphone jack is available on the MatePad Pro. However, Huawei did install a four-channel speaker sound system, which is tuned by Harman Kardon and utilizes HiSten's 6.0 3D software. All speakers are stereo and offer surround sound quality. Five circumferential microphones enable a 360° noise cancellation, ensuring that vocal audio comes out crisper and louder.

==== Front camera ====
The 13 MP front camera is in the form of a punch-hole. It has an aperture of f/2.0 and is able to support HDR. It can record videos at 30 frames per second in Full HD (1080p) resolution.

=== Software ===
Due to the ripple effect that the China–United States trade war caused on Chinese companies, Huawei halted operations for the pre-installing of Google Services on their latest devices, and so, started promoting the use of their own software, namely, EMUI and Huawei Mobile Services (HMS). The MatePad Pro comes with EMUI 10.1 based on the source code of Android 10, and offers a new always-on display, a replacement assistant for the Google Assistant named Celia and a new video chat application called Huawei Meetime. The software also recognizes and supports air gestures that are made by the user with the re-designed M-Pencil (similar to that of Samsung's S-Pen). The tablet supports multitasking of up to two apps and is capable of downloading desktop applications like Firefox, which would not readily be supported nor available on a tablet or smartphone. Huawei has also started pre-installing, promoting and emphasizing use of their new app distribution platform called the 'Huawei AppGallery' on their products that lack Google Play.
