= Huawei Mate X =

High-end foldable smartphone from Huawei

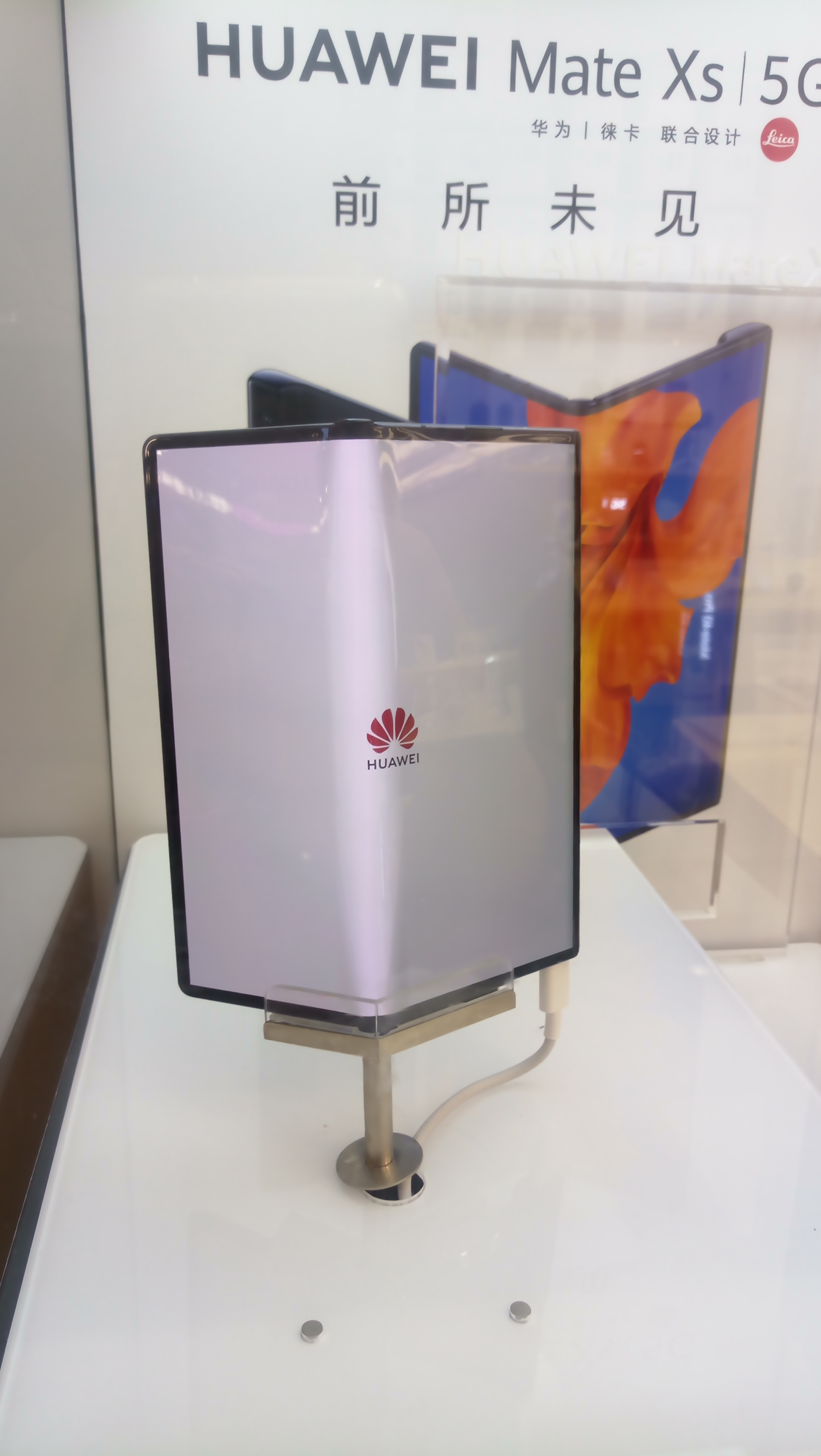
- Huawei Mate Xs
- Manufacturer: Huawei
- Type: Foldable smartphone
- Series: Huawei Mate
- First released: 15 November 2019; 7 years ago (China)
- Discontinued: NA
- Successor: Huawei Mate X2
- Related: Huawei Mate 30
- Compatible networks: All Models: 2G GSM/EDGE – 850/900/1800/1900MHz; 3G TD-SCDMA – 1880-1920/2010-2025 MHz; 3G UMTS(WCDMA)/HSPA+/DC-HSDPA – Band 1/2/4/5/6/8/19; 4G TD-LTE – Band 34/38/39/40/41; 4G FDD-LTE – Band 1/2/3/4/5/6/7/8/9/12/17/18/19/20/26/28/32; 5G NR TDD – N41/77/78/79; Single or Dual SIM (Dual 4G & Dual VoLTE)
- Form factor: Phablet
- Dimensions: Unfolded; 161.3 mm (6.35 in) H; 146.2 mm (5.76 in) W; 5.4 mm (0.21 in) D; Folded; 161.3 mm (6.35 in) H; 78.3 mm (3.08 in) W; 11 mm (0.43 in) D
- Weight: 295 g (10.4 oz)
- Operating system: Android 9.0 (SDK Rom)
- System-on-chip: HiSilicon Kirin 980
- CPU: Octa-core (2x 2.6 GHz ARM Cortex-A76, 2x 1.92 GHz ARM Cortex-A76, 4x 1.8 GHz ARM Cortex-A55)
- GPU: ARM Mali-G76 MP10, 720 MHz
- Memory: 8 GB
- Storage: 512 GB
- Removable storage: Huawei Nano Memory up to 256 GB
- SIM: nanoSIM
- Battery: 4500 mAh Li-Po
- Charging: Huawei Supercharge 55w
- Rear camera: Leica: 40 MP Wide (f/1.8, 27mm, 1/1.7", PDAF) + 16 MP Ultrawide (f/2.2, 17mm) + 8 MP Telephoto (f/2.4, 52mm) + ToF sensor
- Display: OLED, 414 ppi: Full; 8 in (200 mm) 2480x2200; Cover; 6.6 in (170 mm) 2480x1148
- Connectivity: Wi-Fi, 802.11a/b/g/n/ac with Wi-Fi Direct support, BT5.0, BLE, aptX/aptX HD, USB Type C 3.1
- Data inputs: GPS/Glonass/BDS/Galileo/QZSS, accelerometer, gyroscope, compass, proximity sensor, barometer
- Website: consumer.huawei.com/en/phones/mate-x/

The Huawei Mate X is an Android-based high end foldable smartphone produced by Huawei. It was unveiled at MWC 2019 on 25 February 2019 and was originally scheduled to launch in June 2019, but the launch was pushed back to allow for extensive testing in light of the failures reported by users of a similar product, the Galaxy Fold from Samsung. The Mate X launched in China only in November 2019. Huawei announced the Mate Xs on 24 February 2020 as a hardware revision of the original Mate X; it was released in "global markets" outside China in March 2020. The device features a more durable display, improved hinge function and a redesigned cooling system, as well as the newer Kirin 990 5G SoC and Android 10 with EMUI 10.

== Specifications ==
=== Hardware ===
The Mate X has an 8-inch OLED display that can fold outwards resulting in a 6.6-inch main display and a 6.38-inch rear display. The screen is covered by plastic and is secured by a push-button latch when closed. It uses the Kirin 980 and has 8 GB of RAM with 512 GB of UFS 2.1 storage. The latter is expandable up to 256 GB via Huawei's proprietary Nano Memory. The device contains two batteries split between the two halves, totaling a 4500 mAh capacity, and can quick charge at 55W. The Mate X has a bar situated on the right side of the device with four cameras and an LED flash on the back, the power button/fingerprint sensor on the left side and a USB-C port on the bottom. The cameras include a 40 MP main lens, a 16 MP wide-angle lens, an 8 MP telephoto lens and a time-of-flight sensor. The bar is roughly twice as thick as the rest of the device, giving the user a grip to hold it. Unlike the Galaxy Fold, it comes standard with 5G enabled by Huawei's own Balong 5000 modem.

=== Software ===
The Mate X runs on Android 9.0 "Pie" with Huawei's EMUI 9.1 skin.
