= EMUI =

Mobile UI developed by Huawei

Huawei EMUI
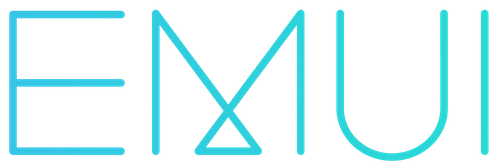

- Screenshot Screenshot of EMUI 8, running on a Huawei Y6 (2018 model)
- Developer: Huawei
- OS family: AOSP (Linux, Unix-like)
- Working state: Current
- Source model: Free software with proprietary components
- Initial release: 30 July 2012; 14 years ago
- Update method: Firmware over-the-air
- Package manager: Huawei AppGallery (2012–2026, both Global and China), APK files, .app (since HarmonyOS 2)
- Supported platforms: 32 and 64-bit ARM
- Kernel type: Multi-kernel, combination of Monolithic: modified Linux kernel; and HMOS TEE microkernel (since HarmonyOS 2.0)
- License: GPLv2 (kernel), Apache License 2.0, Proprietary
- Succeeded by: HarmonyOS (HarmonyOS NEXT)
- Official website: consumer.huawei.com/en/emui/

EMUI (formerly known as Emotion UI) is an interface based on Android developed by Chinese technology company Huawei, used on the company's smartphones primarily globally.

Since late 2019, beginning with the Mate 30, EMUI devices sold internationally have used Huawei Mobile Services, such as the Huawei AppGallery, instead of Google Mobile Services, following United States sanctions imposed during the trade war against China from May 2019.

== History ==
On 30 July 2012, Huawei introduced Emotion UI 1.0, based on Android 4.0. It features a voice assistant app (only in Chinese), customizable homescreens and theme-switching. The company rolled out installation files for the Ascend P1 through their website. The company claims that it is "probably the world's most emotional system".

On 4 September 2014, the company announced Emotion UI 3.0, along with Ascend Mate 7 in the pre-IFA event in Berlin. The user interface was ever since called "EMUI" instead of "Emotion UI".

EMUI 3.1 debuted on the Huawei P8, which was unveiled on 15 April 2015 at Old Billingsgate in London. Running on top of Android 5.0 "Lollipop", the release introduced camera-oriented features including Director Mode, which lets the phone wirelessly control up to three other Android handsets to film a scene from multiple angles simultaneously; Light Painting long-exposure modes; and an enhanced selfie mode. It also added "Knuckle Sense" gesture controls that capture a screenshot when the user double-taps the screen with a knuckle, and a voice function for locating a misplaced phone.

In late 2015, Huawei introduced EMUI 4.0, based on Android Marshmallow, on the Mate 8 in China; its international variant debuted at CES 2016 in Las Vegas. In 2016, EMUI 5.0 was introduced, based on Android Nougat, on the Mate 9 at a global launch in Munich. In 2017, Huawei introduced EMUI 8.0, based on Android Oreo; beginning with this release, the version number would now be aligned with that of the Android version from which it was derived.

In May 2018, Huawei announced that it would end its bootloader unlocking service for its smartphones. Devices launched after 24 May 2018 would no longer be eligible for bootloader unlock codes, while models released before that date could still request a code during a 60-day window following the announcement. Huawei said the change was intended to provide a better user experience and to avoid problems caused by ROM flashing. The move was criticised by the custom ROM development community, for whom Huawei had previously been regarded as one of the more accommodating Android manufacturers.

Huawei unveiled EMUI 9.0, based on Android Pie, at IFA in 2018. Huawei stated a goal for the release to make EMUI more "simple", "enjoyable", and consistent; it included various usability tweaks, reorganized settings menus, dark mode, gesture navigation, and GPU Turbo 2.0. Beginning with EMUI 9.0.1, new Huawei devices ship with the company's EROFS file system for its system partitions, which is designed for higher performance in read-only settings on devices with limited resources. In July 2019, Huawei released EMUI 9.1

EMUI 10, based on Android 10, was announced 9 August 2019 at the Huawei Developer Conference. At the same conference, Huawei also unveiled its own operating system, HarmonyOS, for the first time; the platform would go on to replace EMUI on Huawei devices in Mainland China from 2021. It features an updated interface with larger "magazine"-styled headings, new animations, colour accents inspired by painter Giorgio Morandi, and Android 10's system-wide dark mode support. Beginning 2020 due to United States sanctions against Huawei (which prohibit U.S.-based companies from doing business with the company), new EMUI smartphones sold internationally (beginning with the Mate 30) were no longer certified by Google, did not include support for Google Mobile Services (GMS) including Google Play, and were marketed as running EMUI with no reference to the Android trademark. These devices introduced the AppGallery and Huawei Mobile Services to international markets as an alternative to Google-provided software.

In 2020 alongside the P40, Huawei announced EMUI 10.1, which adds multi-window support, and the new first-party apps Celia and MeeTime. Huawei announced updates for some of its existing devices in June 2020. In September 2020, at the Huawei Developer Conference, Huawei announced HarmonyOS 2.0 alongside EMUI 11 as the company shifted towards HarmonyOS development. In December 2020, Huawei released a developer beta of HarmonyOS 2.0 for existing devices including the P40 and Mate 30 series, in a build that reviewers found to be based on a fork of Android 10.

In October 2021, Huawei announced EMUI 12, with a rollout to older Huawei smartphone models planned for the first half of 2022.

EMUI 12 (2022) was the first EMUI version to integrate features from HarmonyOS 2 on top of an AOSP base, and featured a Distributed File System that let users access files across HarmonyOS-powered devices such as smart TVs and speakers. EMUI 12 supported Large Folders that grouped similar apps in a large folder and named the folder for better organised management and discovery of apps.

The EMUI 12 update was for pervious Huawei smartphones.

On 20 October 2022, Huawei unveiled EMUI 13 on their official website. It inherited the main features unveiled with HarmonyOS 3, such as widgets that can be stacked on top of one another or folders that can be resized like Android widgets.

Independent Honor confirmed MagicOS 8, based on Android 14, on 21 July 2023, and launched it on 10 January 2024.

HarmonyOS 4.0 was released on 4 August 2023. EMUI 14 first appeared publicly on the Mate 60 RS Ultimate Design at MWC 2024 in Barcelona. On 5 March 2024, Huawei announced the EMUI 14 beta program for global users, bringing HarmonyOS 4 features. The rollout reportedly, is planned for summer, between 6 and 25 June 2024 release on nine models along with Nova 11i models on 3 July 2024, also newer Huawei Mate 60 flagships bundled with the new software.

On 25 April 2024, Huawei rolled out EMUI 14.2 with no major new features such as AI features on HarmonyOS 4.2 Chinese variant, features system stability in Russia with countries planned to follow suit shortly. It also provides MicroG and GBox, which allows using Google apps.

On 12 December 2024, Huawei launched Mate X6 foldable first device preinstalled with the global variant software of HarmonyOS 4.3/EMUI 15 in its Dubai launch event.

On 14 July 2026, Huawei unveiled EMUI 16 alongside the Pura 90s Pro and Pura 90s Pro Max at a global launch event in Kuala Lumpur, Malaysia. Based on Android 16, it launched in international markets without Google Mobile Services.

== Version history ==
Version	Android, HarmonyOS history	Launch device	Date and venue	Last stable release
Emotion UI 1.x	Android 4.0 – 4.3	Ascend Mate	30 July 2012 (China); 30 August 2012 (global); Global debut at IFA 2012, Berlin	1.6
Emotion UI 2.x	Android 4.2 – 4.4	Honor 3X	16 December 2013; Honor sub-brand launch, Beijing	2.3
Emotion UI 3.x / EMUI 3.x	Android 4.4 – 5.1	Ascend Mate7	4 September 2014; IFA 2014, Berlin; interface renamed "EMUI"	3.1
EMUI 4.x	Android Marshmallow (6.x)	Mate 8	26 November 2015 (China); 5 January 2016 (global); Shanghai launch; global debut at CES 2016, Las Vegas	4.1
EMUI 5.x	Android Nougat (7.x)	Mate 9	3 November 2016; Munich, "A Step Ahead" launch	5.1
EMUI 8.x	Android Oreo (8.0–8.1)	Mate 10 / Mate 10 Pro	16 October 2017; Munich launch event	8.2
EMUI 9.x Magic UI 2.x	Android Pie (9)	Mate 20 series	1 September 2018; Unveiled at IFA 2018, Berlin	9.1
EMUI 10.x Magic UI 3.x	Android 10	Mate 30 series	9 August 2019; HDC 2019 (Huawei Developer Conference)	10.1
EMUI 11.x Magic UI 4.0	Android 10	Mate 40 series	10 September 2020; HDC 2020 (Huawei Developer Conference)	11.0
EMUI 12.x Magic UI 5.2	Android 10 (legacy devices) or Android 11 (pre-installed) (AOSP); shares features with HarmonyOS 2	nova 9 (global)	27 August 2021; Online announcement (no launch event)	12.0
EMUI 13.x	Android 12 (AOSP); shares features with HarmonyOS 3	Mate 50 Pro (international)	20 October 2022; Online announcement	13.1
EMUI 14.x	Android 12 (AOSP); shares features with HarmonyOS 4	nova 12 series (global)	5 March 2024; Shown at MWC 2024; overseas beta program	14.2
EMUI 15	Android 12 (AOSP); shares features with HarmonyOS 4.3	Mate X6 (global)	12 December 2024; Dubai, "Unfold the Classic" launch	15.0
EMUI 16	Android 16 (AOSP)	Pura 90s series (global)	14 July 2026; Kuala Lumpur, "Now Is Your Moment" launch	16.0

== Reception ==
Earlier versions of EMUI have been criticized for placing all app icons on the home screen, with some reviewers saying that it tries to imitate Apple's iOS. The app drawer has been brought back as an option in EMUI 5.0. PC Magazine's Adam Smith criticized EMUI for being bloated with duplicate apps and the settings menus being difficult to navigate.
