= Huawei Y5c =

Smartphone model

Huawei Y5c (Honor Bee in India)
- Brand: Huawei, Honor
- Manufacturer: Huawei
- Type: Smartphone
- Series: Huawei Y/Honor Bee
- First released: Honor Bee: May 2015; 11 years ago Y5c: July 2015; 10 years ago
- Availability by region: Worldwide: Y5c; India: Honor Bee
- Successor: Honor Bee 2
- Related: Huawei Y3; Huawei Y5; Huawei Y6
- Compatible networks: GSM, 3G, 4G (LTE)
- Form factor: Monoblock
- Colors: Black, White
- Dimensions: 134,3 x 66,7 x 10 mm
- Weight: 170 g (6 oz)
- Operating system: Android 4.4.2 (KitKat), EMUI Lite 3
- System-on-chip: Spreadtrum SC7731
- CPU: 4×1,2 GHz Cortex-A7
- GPU: Mali-400MP2
- Memory: 1GB RAM; Memory card: microSDHC
- Storage: 8 GB eMMC 4.5
- SIM: Dual SIM (Micro-SIM)
- Battery: Li-Ion 1730 mAh, removable Stand-by: Up to 280 h (2G), Up to 220 h (3G); Talk time: Up to 6 h min (2G), Up to 7 h (3G)
- Rear camera: 8 MP, f/2.0, AF; Dual-LED flash, panorama Video: 1080p@30fps
- Front camera: 2 MP; Video: 480p@30fps
- Display: TFT LCD, 4.5", 854 × 480, 16:9, 218 ppi
- Connectivity: WLAN: Wi-Fi 802.11 b/g/n, Wi-Fi Direct, hotspot Bluetooth: 4.0, A2DP, LE

The Huawei Y5c is an Android smartphone manufactured and developed by the Chinese company Huawei from the Y series. It was introduced in July 2015. In India, the smartphone was sold under the name Honor Bee.

== Design ==
The screen is made of glass. The phone case is made of plastic.

There is a microphone located at the bottom. At the top, you will find a 3.5mm audio jack and a microUSB port. On the right side, there are volume control buttons and a power button to lock the smartphone. The speaker is located on the back panel, which can be removed. The slots for 2 SIM cards and a microSD memory card up to 32 GB are located under the case.

The Huawei Y5c and Honor Bee was sold in Black and White colors.

== Technical specifications ==
=== Processor ===
The smartphone is powered by a Spreadtrum SC7731 processor and features a Mali-400MP2 graphics card.

=== Battery ===
The smartphone has a 2000 mAh battery. The battery is also replaceable.

=== Camera ===
The smartphone has an 8MP main camera with f/2.0 aperture and autofocus, capable of recording video in 1080p resolution at 30 frames per second. The front camera has a 2MP resolution and can record video in 480p resolution at 30 frames per second.

=== Display ===
The display has a TFT LCD screen, 4.5 inches, 854 x 480 resolution with a 16:9 aspect ratio and a pixel density of 218 ppi.

=== Storage ===
Available in 1 & 8 GB configurations

=== Software ===
The smartphone runs on EMUI Lite 3.1 based on Android 4.4.2 KitKat.
