= Huawei Y6 Pro =

2016 Android smartphone

Huawei Y6 Pro (Huawei Enjoy 5 and Honor Play 5X in China; Honor Holly 2 Plus in India)
- Brand: Huawei, Honor
- Manufacturer: Huawei
- Type: Smartphone
- Series: Huawei Y/Enjoy; Honor Play/Holly
- First released: Honor Play 5X: October 10, 2015; 10 years ago Enjoy 5: October 12, 2015; 10 years ago Y6 Pro: February 10, 2016; 10 years ago Honor Holly 2 Plus: July 21, 2015; 10 years ago
- Predecessor: Honor Holly
- Successor: Huawei Y6 II Compact; Huawei Enjoy 6 Honor Holly 3
- Related: Huawei Y6; Huawei Enjoy 5S; Honor 5 Play
- Compatible networks: GSM, 3G, 4G (LTE)
- Form factor: Slate
- Colors: Gray, Gold, and White
- Dimensions: 143.1×71.8×9.7 mm (5.63×2.83×0.38 in)
- Weight: 160 g (6 oz)
- Operating system: Android 5.1 Lollipop + EMUI 3.1 Lite
- CPU: MediaTek MT6735P (28 nm), 4×1.3 GHz Cortex-A53
- GPU: Mali-T720MP2
- Memory: 2 GB, LPDDR3
- Storage: 16 GB, eMMC 5.0
- Removable storage: MicroSDXC up to 128 GB
- Battery: Non-removable, Li-Po 4000 mAh, reverse charging
- Charging: 10W wired (Reverse wired)
- Rear camera: 13 MP, f/2.0, 28 mm (wide-angle), AF; LED flash, HDR, panorama Video: 720p@30fps
- Front camera: 5 MP, f/2.2 Video: 720p@30fps
- Display: IPS LCD, 5.0", 1280 × 720 (HD), 16:9, 294 ppi
- Connectivity: MicroUSB 2.0, 3.5 mm Audio, Bluetooth 4.1 (A2DP, LE), FM radio, Wi-Fi 802.11 b/g/n (Wi-Fi Direct, hotspot), GPS, A-GPS, GLONASS
- Data inputs: Proximity sensor, Accelerometer

The Huawei Y6 Pro is a mid-range smartphone developed and manufactured by Huawei, which is an improvised version of the Huawei Y6. It was first released on February 10, 2016. In China, the smartphone was released under the name Huawei Enjoy 6 and Honor Play 5X, released in October 2015. In India, it was released under the name Honor Holly 2 Plus.

== Specifications ==
=== Design ===
The smartphone screen is made of glass. The back and frame is made of plastic. At the bottom, there is a microUSB connector, a speaker, and a microphone styled to look like a speaker. At the top, there is a 3.5 mm audio jack. On the right side, there are volume buttons and the smartphone's power button. A second microphone, the main camera, and the flash are located on the back panel. Slots for two SIM cards and a microSD memory card up to 128 GB are located under the removable back panel.

The Huawei Y6 Pro was sold in three colors: grey, white, and gold.

=== Hardware ===
The smartphone features a MediaTek MT6735P central processor and a Mali-T720MP2 GPU. The battery has a capacity of 4000 mAh and supports reverse wired charging.

The Y6 Pro features an IPS LCD display, sizing at about 5.0", and supports HD (1280 × 720) with a pixel density of 294 ppi and a 16:9 aspect ratio.

The smartphone was sold in a 2/16 GB configuration.

==== Cameras ====
The smartphone is equipped with a 13 MP main camera, f/2.0 (wide-angle) with autofocus and 720p@30fps video recording capability. The front camera has a 5 MP resolution, f/2.2 aperture, and 720p@30fps video recording capability.

=== Software ===
The smartphone runs on EMUI 3.1 Lite based on Android 5.1 Lollipop.

== See also ==
- Acer Liquid Z520
- Samsung Galaxy J1
- Sony Xperia Z5
