= Huawei Nova lite =

2017 smartphone model

Huawei Nova Lite 2017/Y6 Pro/P9 lite mini
- Brand: Huawei
- Manufacturers: Huawei
- Type: smartphone
- Series: Nova
- First released: August 2017
- Availability by region: September 2017
- Predecessor: Huawei Nova lite Huawei Y6 II Compact
- Successor: Huawei Nova lite 2 Huawei Y6 Prime 2018
- Related: Huawei Nova; Huawei Y6 2017; Huawei P9 lite
- Compatible networks: GSM; HSDPA
- Dimensions: 143.5×71×8.05 mm (5.650×2.795×0.317 in)
- Weight: 145 g (5 oz)
- Operating system: Android 7.0 (Nougat) + EMUI 5.1
- CPU: Qualcomm Snapdragon 425
- Memory: 2 GB
- Storage: 16 GB
- Removable storage: Micro SD
- Battery: 3020 mAh
- Rear camera: 13 MP main, 5 MP front Full HD video recording 1920x1080
- Display: 5", IPS-matrix, 1280x720, 294 ppi, 16:9
- Sound: MP3, eAAC+, WAV, Flac; MP4, H.264
- Other: Bluetooth, GPS, Wi-Fi 802.11 b/g/n Micro USB, 3.5 mm audio jack

The Huawei Nova lite (also known as Huawei Y6 Pro (2017) and P9 lite mini) is a budget smartphone from Huawei, which was released in August 2017.

== Design ==
The phone has an aluminum body with a thickness of 8.05 mm. A fingerprint sensor and a camera with an LED flash are located on the back side. The front features a 5-inch IPS-LCD display with a resolution of 1280x720 px and a pixel density of 294 ppi. The front panel is protected by 2.5D curved glass.

The smartphone does not have a "Home" button; the controls are on-screen. The device has a 3.5 mm audio jack (mini-jack) and is charged via Micro USB.

It comes three color options: Black, Gold, and Silver.

== Technical specifications ==
=== Hardware ===
The smartphone is built on the basis of Qualcomm MSM8917 Snapdragon 425. This is a processor with 4 Cortex-A53 cores clocked at 1.4 GHz. The graphics processor is Adreno 308.

The internal and RAM storage capacity is 16 GB and 2 GB, respectively. It is possible to install a Micro SD memory card with a capacity of up to 128 GB.

The smartphone received a 13 MP main camera with an aperture of f/2.0 and a 5 MP front camera with f/2.4.The battery is non-removable with a capacity of 3020 mAh.

=== Software ===
The Nova lite/Y6 Pro/P9 lite mini runs on Android 7.0 (Nougat) OS with the EMUI 5.1 graphical shell. It also supports communication standards: 2G, 3G, GSM 850/1900, GSM 900/1800, LTE is absent, WCDMA(UMTS) 900/2100.
