= Huawei P8 lite (2017) =

Smartphone model

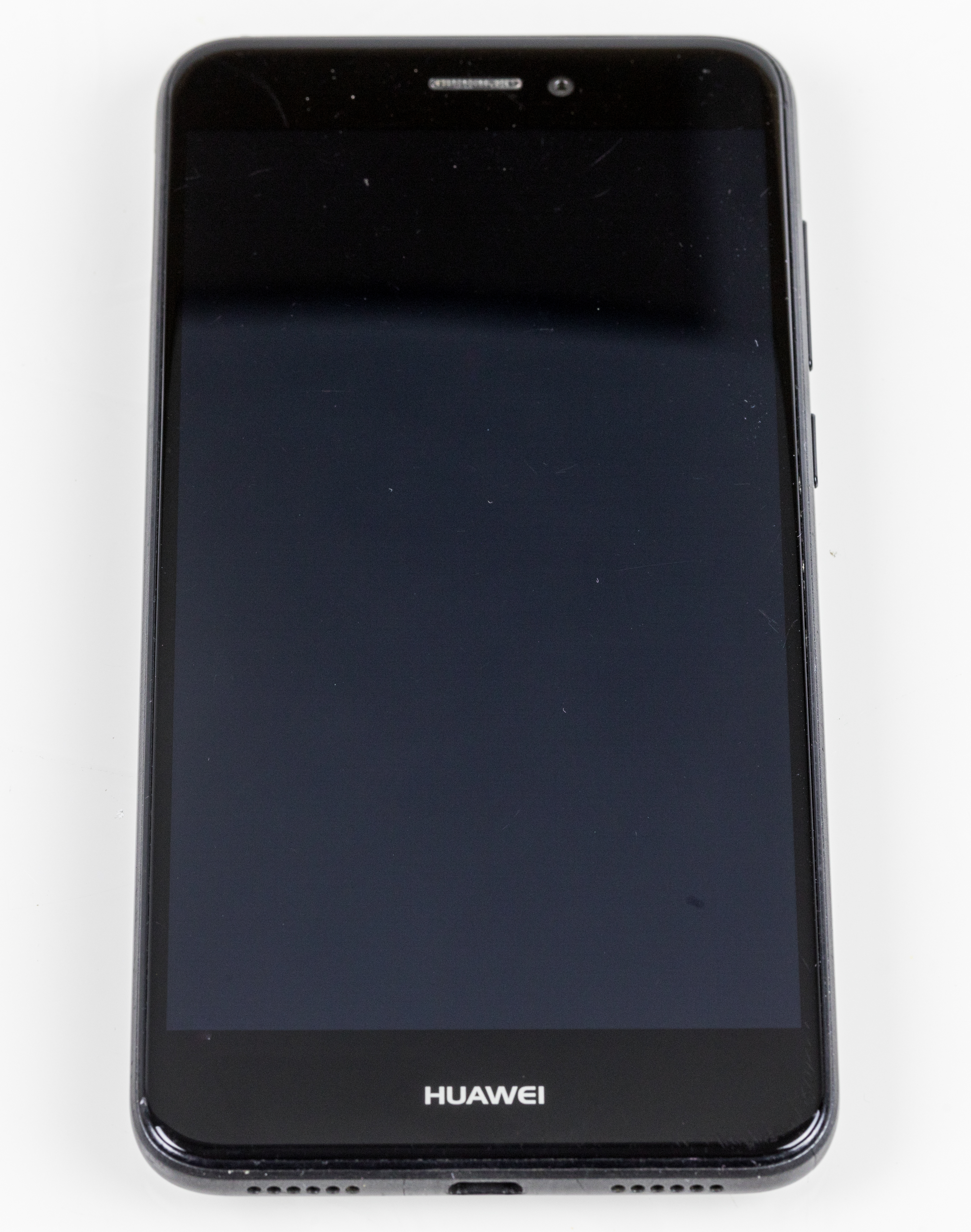
- Front view of the P8 lite 2017
- Brand: Huawei, Honor
- Manufacturer: Huawei
- Type: Smartphone
- Series: Huawei P/Nova/G; Honor Lite
- First released: January 2017
- Predecessor: Huawei P8 lite Huawei P9 lite Honor 7 Lite; Huawei GR3
- Successor: Honor 9 Lite; Huawei Nova lite 2017; Huawei Nova 2 lite
- Related: Honor 8 Huawei Nova lite+ Huawei GR5 2017
- Compatible networks: GSM / HSPA / LTE
- Form factor: Slate
- Dimensions: 147.2×73×7.6 mm (5.80×2.87×0.30 in)
- Weight: 147 g (5 oz)
- Operating system: Android 7.0; EMUI 5.0
- CPU: HiSilicon Kirin 655 (16 nm), Cortex-A53 (4 x 2.1 GHz + 4 x 1.7 GHz)
- GPU: Mali-T830 MP2 (implied by Kirin 655)
- Memory: 3 GB
- Storage: 16 GB
- Removable storage: microSD, up to 256 GB
- Battery: Non-removable, 3000 mAh
- Rear camera: 12 MP, AF; LED flash
- Front camera: 8 MP
- Display: 5.2" (IPS); Full HD 1920x1080
- Connectivity: Wi-Fi (802.11 b/g/n); Bluetooth 4.1; GPS
- Data inputs: Multi-touch, accelerometer, proximity, sensor, ambient light sensor, compass, fingerprint sensor

The Huawei P8 lite (2017) is an Android smartphone developed by Huawei, first released under the name P8 lite in 2015. In other countries, this model is also sold under the names Huawei P9 lite (2017), Honor 8 Lite, Huawei Nova lite, and Huawei GR3 (2017). Sales started in Ukraine in February 2017.

== Design & Appearance ==
The body is covered on both sides by protective 2.5D glass.

It has a fingerprint sensor on the back panel. It measures 73 mm wide, 147.2 mm high, 7.6 mm deep, and it weighs 147 grams.

It is available in 4 colors: Black, White, Blue and Gold. The back panel is made of glossy plastic, and the plastic frame on the white model is silver.

== Technical specifications ==
=== Hardware ===
The smartphone is built on the HiSilicon Kirin 655. This is an 8-core SoC: 4 Cortex-A53 cores at 2.1 GHz and 4 energy-efficient cores with a frequency of 1.7 GHz. The graphics accelerator is the Mali-T830MP2.

Its RAM capacity is 3 GB, and the internal storage is 16 GB. There is also a hybrid slot for a microSD card with a capacity of up to 256 GB. The screen is an IPS matrix with a 5.2-inch diagonal and a resolution of 1080x1920 pixels. The aspect ratio is 16:9.

Its non-revovable battery has a 3000 mAh. The main camera is 12 MP with autofocus. The front camera is 8 MP.

=== Software ===
The P8 lite (2017) runs on Android 7.0 (Nougat) operating system with the EMUI 5.0 graphic shell. It supports the following communication standards - GSM, HSPA, and LTE.
