= Huawei Y6 II =

2016 smartphone model

Huawei Y6 II (Honor Holly 3 in India, Honor 5A in Malaysia)
- Brand: Huawei, Honor
- Manufacturer: Huawei
- Type: Smartphone
- First released: Y6 II: August 2016; Honor Holly 3: October 12, 2016
- Predecessor: Huawei Y6; Honor Holly 2 Plus
- Successor: Huawei Y6 (2017); Honor Holly 4
- Related: Huawei Y6 II Compact; Huawei Y3 II; Huawei Y5 II
- Compatible networks: GSM, 3G, 4G (LTE); WLAN: Wi-Fi 802.11 b/g/n, Wi-Fi Direct, hotspot
- Form factor: Monoblock
- Colors: Black, White, Gold
- Dimensions: 154.3×77.1×8.5 mm (6.07×3.04×0.33 in)
- Weight: 168 g (6 oz)
- Operating system: Android 6.0 Marshmallow + EMUI 4.1
- System-on-chip: Kirin 620 (28 nm)
- CPU: HiSilicon Kirin 620 (28 nm), 8×1.2 GHz Cortex-A53
- GPU: Mali-450MP4
- Memory: Y6 II & Honor 5A: 2GB; Honor Holly 3: 2/3GB LPDDR3; Memory card: MicroSDXC up to 128 GB
- Storage: Y6 II & Honor 5A: 16 GB; Honor Holly 3: 16/32 GB eMMC 5.0
- Battery: Non-removable, Li-Po 3100 mAh
- Rear camera: 13 Мп, f/2.0, 28 mm (wide), AF; LED flash, HDR, panorama Video: 1080p@30fps
- Front camera: 8 MP, f/2.0, 24mm (wide), 1/4", 1.12 μm Video: 720p@30fps
- Display: IPS LCD, 5.5", 1280 × 720 (HD), 16:9, 267 ppi

Huawei Y6 II is a smartphone developed by Huawei. In India, the smartphone was introduced as Honor Holly 3, while in Malaysia, it was known as Honor 5A (not to be confused with the global Honor 5A)."

In Ukraine, the Huawei Y6 II went on sale on August 10, 2016.

== Design ==
The smartphone screen is made of glass. The phone case is made of plastic.

At the bottom is a microUSB port, a speaker, and a microphone styled to look like a speaker. At the top, there is a 3.5mm audio jack. On the right side, there are volume control buttons and the power button. A second microphone is located on the back panel. Slots for 2 SIM cards and a microSD memory card up to 128GB are located under the removable back panel.

The Huawei Y6 II was available in 3 colors: Black, White, and Gold. In Ukraine, the smartphone was available in black and gold colors.

== Specifications ==
=== Processor and GPU ===
The smartphone is powered by a Kirin 620 processor and features a Mali-450MP4 GPU.

=== Battery ===
The phone's battery capacity is 3100 mAh.

=== Camera ===
The smartphone features a 13MP main camera with f/2.0 aperture and autofocus, capable of recording video in 1080p resolution at 30 frames per second. The front-facing camera has an 8MP resolution, f/2.0 aperture, and can record video in 720p resolution at 30 frames per second.

=== Display ===
The device features a 5.5-inch HD IPS LCD display with a resolution of 1280 x 720 pixels and a 16:9 aspect ratio.

=== Phone storage ===
The Huawei Y6 II and the Malaysian Honor 5A were sold in a configuration with a 2GB of RAM and a 16GB of storage.

The Honor Holly 3 was sold in 2/16 GB and 3/32 GB configurations.

=== Software ===
The smartphone runs on EMUI 4.1, based on Android 6.0 Marshmallow.
