= Huawei Nova Plus =

Huawei Nova Plus (Huawei G9 Plus and Huawei Maimang 5 in China)
- Brand: Huawei
- Manufacturer: Huawei
- Type: Smartphone
- Series: Huawei Nova/G/Maimang
- First released: Maimang 5: July 14, 2016; 9 years ago G9 Plus: August 19, 2016; 9 years ago Nova Plus: September 1, 2016; 9 years ago
- Predecessor: Huawei G8
- Successor: Huawei Nova 2 Plus; Huawei Maimang 6
- Related: Huawei Nova; Huawei Nova lite Huawei Nova Smart; Huawei G9 lite
- Compatible networks: GSM, 3G, 4G (LTE)
- Form factor: Slate
- Colors: Prestige Gold, Mystic Silver, Titanium Grey
- Dimensions: 151.8×75.7×7.3 mm (5.98×2.98×0.29 in)
- Weight: 160 g (6 oz)
- Operating system: Original: Android 6.0.1 Marshmallow + EMUI 4.1; Current: Android 7.0 Nougat + EMUI 5
- CPU: Qualcomm MSM8953 Snapdragon 625 (14 nm), 8x2.0 GHz Cortex-A53
- GPU: Adreno 506
- Memory: Nova Plus: 3 GB; G9 Plus & Maimang 5: 3/4 GB
- Storage: Nova Plus: 32 GB; G9 Plus & Maimang 5: 32/64 GB eMMC 5.1
- Removable storage: MicroSDXC up to 256 GB
- Battery: Non-removable, Li-Po 3340 mAh
- Rear camera: 16 MP, f/2.0, 1/2.8", 1.12μm, PDAF, OIS; 2-LED dual-tone flash, HDR, panorama Video: 4K@30fps, 1080p@30fps
- Front camera: 8 MP, f/2.0, 22 mm (wide-angle); Video: 1080p@30fps
- Display: IPS LCD, 5.5", 1920 x 1080 (FullHD), 16:9, 401 ppi
- Connectivity: USB-C 2.0, 3.5 mm Audio, Bluetooth 4.1 (A2DP, LE), NFC (Nova Plus), FM radio, Wi-Fi 802.11 b/g/n (Wi-Fi Direct, hotspot), GPS, A-GPS, GLONASS, BDS (G9 Plus)
- Other: Fingerprint scanner (rear-mounted), proximity sensor, accelerometer, compass

The Huawei Nova Plus (stylized as HUAWEI nova Plus) is a mid-range smartphone developed by Huawei. It was announced on September 1, 2016, along with the Huawei Nova smartphone and the Huawei MediaPad M3 tablet. In China, the smartphone was sold under the names Huawei G9 Plus and Huawei Maimang 5.

== Design ==
The smartphone screen is made of glass. The body is made of aviation aluminum with plastic inserts at the top and bottom.

The USB-C port, speaker, and a microphone stylized to look like a speaker are located at the bottom. The second microphone and 3.5 mm audio jack are located at the top. On the left side, depending on the version, there is a slot for 1 SIM card and a microSD memory card up to 256 GB, or a hybrid slot for 2 SIM cards or 1 SIM card and a microSD memory card up to 256 GB. The volume control buttons and the smartphone lock button are located on the right side. The fingerprint scanner is located on the back panel.

The color options differ depending on th model:

- The Huawei Nova Plus was sold in 3 colors: Titanium Grey (grey), Mystic Silver (silver), and Prestige Gold (gold).
- The Huawei G9 Plus was sold in 3 colors: Grey, Silver, and Gold.
- The Huawei Maimang 5 was sold in 3 colors: Silver, Gold, and Pink.

== Technical specifications ==
=== Hardware ===
The smartphone features a Qualcomm Snapdragon 625 processor and an Adreno 506 GPU. The nova plus has a 3340 mAh capacity. The smartphone features a 16 MP main camera, f/2.0 with phase autofocus, optical stabilization, and 4K@30fps video recording capability. The front camera has an 8 MP resolution, f/2.4 aperture (wide-angle), and 1080p@30fps video recording capability.

The display is an IPS LCD, 5.5", FullHD (1920 x 1080) with a pixel density of 401 ppi and a 16:9 aspect ratio.

The memory and storange configurations differ from the following models:

- The Nova Plus was sold in a 3/32 GB configuration.
- The G9 Plus was sold in 3/32, 3/64, and 4/64 GB configurations.
- The Maimang 5 was sold in 3/32 and 4/64 GB configurations.

=== Software ===
The smartphone was released with EMUI 4.1 based on Android 6.0.1 Marshmallow. It was updated to EMUI 5 based on Android 7.0 Nougat.
