= Huawei Y6 (2017) =

Smartphone model

Huawei Y6 (2017) (Honor 6 Play in China) Huawei Nova Young
- Brand: Huawei, Honor
- Manufacturer: Huawei
- Type: Smartphone
- Series: Huawei Y Series; Honor Play
- First released: Y6 (2017): July 2017; Honor 6 Play: September 2017
- Predecessor: Huawei Y6 II; Honor Holly 3 / Honor 5A
- Successor: Huawei Y6 (2018)
- Related: Huawei Y3 (2017); Huawei Y5 (2017); Huawei Y7
- Compatible networks: GSM / HSPA / LTE
- Colors: White (Both), Gold (Both), Gray (Y6 2017 only)
- Dimensions: 143.8 x 72 x 8.4 mm (8.9 mm in-depth for Honor 6 Play)
- Weight: 150 g (5.3 oz)
- Operating system: Android 6.0 Marshmallowl, EMUI 4.1
- System-on-chip: Mediatek MT6737T (28 nm)
- CPU: Quad-core 1.4 GHz Cortex-A53
- GPU: Mali-T720MP2
- Memory: 2GB RAM; Memory card: microSDXC (dedicated slot)
- Storage: 16GB eMMC 5.0
- SIM: Nano-SIM; Dual Nano-SIM
- Battery: Li-Ion 3000 mAh, non-removable
- Rear camera: 13 MP, AF Dual-LED flash Video: 1080p@30fps
- Front camera: 5 MP, LED flash Video: 720p@30fps
- Display: Type: IPS LCD; Size: 5.0 inches, 68.9 cm² Resolution: 720 x 1280 pixels, 16:9 ratio

The Huawei Y6 (2017) (stylized as HUAWEI Y6 2017 and also known as Huawei Nova Young) is an Android smartphone from the Y series manufactured, developed and marketed by Huawei.

In Chinese markets, it was announced and rebranded as the Honor 6 Play, which was developed and branded by Honor - a subsidiary of Huawei.

== Specifications ==
=== Design ===
The screen is made of glass. The phone case is made of plastic.

Similar to the Huawei Y5 2017, there is a microUSB port, a speaker, and a microphone styled to look like a speaker. At the top, there is a 3.5mm audio jack. On the right side, there are volume control buttons and the power button. A second microphone is located on the back panel. Slots for 2 SIM cards and a microSD memory card, which is expandable are located under the removable back panel.

The Huawei Y6 (2017) is available at 3 colors: White, Gold and Gray, while the Honor 6 Play is only available at 2 colors: White and Gold.

=== Processor ===
The Huawei Y6 2017 is powered by a MediaTek MT6737T processor, a quad-core 1.4 GHz. It has a quad core composed with Cortex-A53 cores clocking at 1.4 GHz. The graphics processor is Mali-T720MP2.

=== Display ===
The Huawei Y6 2017 features a 5.0-inch HD glass display with a resolution of 720 x 1280 pixels. It has an aspect ratio of 16:9.

=== Internal memory ===
The internal memory is 16 GB, while the RAM is 2 GB with the possibility of expansion using a microSD memory card up to 128 MB.

=== Camera ===
It has a 13 MP main camera with a dual flash with 1080p@30fps video recording and a 5 MP front camera with a viewing angle of 84° with 720p@30fps video recording.

=== Battery ===
The phone's battery capacity is 3000 mAh.

== Software ==
The Huawei Y6 2017 runs on the Android 6.0 (Marshmallow) operating system with the EMUI 4.1 user interface.

The Y6 (2017) supports communication standards: GSM, HSPA and LTE.

The Y6 (2017) supports wireless interfaces: Wi-Fi 802.11 b/g/n, hotspot, Bluetooth 4.0, A2DP, LE. The smartphone supports the following navigation systems: GPS, A-GPS, GLONASS. It also has an FM radio.
