= Huawei Y6 II Compact =

2016 smartphone

Huawei Y6 II Compact Honor 5A
- Brand: Huawei; Honor
- Manufacturer: Huawei
- Type: Smartphone
- Series: Huawei Y / Honor A
- First released: Honor 5A: June 12, 2016; 10 years ago Y6 II Compact: September 2016; 9 years ago
- Predecessor: Huawei Y6 Pro; Honor 4A
- Successor: Huawei Y6 Pro 2017; Honor 6A
- Related: Huawei Y6 II
- Compatible networks: GSM, 3G, 4G (LTE)
- Form factor: Slate
- Colors: Black, White, Gold
- Dimensions: 143.8×72×8.9 mm (5.66×2.83×0.35 in)
- Weight: 140 g (5 oz)
- Operating system: Original: Android 5.1 Lollipop + EMUI 3.1; Current: Android 6.0 Marshmallow + EMUI 4
- CPU: Y6 II Compact: MediaTek MT6735 (28 nm); Honor 5A: MediaTek MT6735P (28 nm); 4×1.3 GHz Cortex-A53
- GPU: Mali-T720MP2
- Memory: 2 GB, LPDDR3
- Storage: 16 GB, eMMC 5.0
- Removable storage: microSDXC up to 128 GB
- Battery: Removable Li-Po 2200 mAh
- Charging: 10 W
- Rear camera: 13 MP, f/2.0, 28 mm (wide-angle), AF; Dual-LED flash, HDR, panorama Video: 1080p@30fps
- Front camera: 5 MP; LED flash Video: 720p@30fps
- Display: IPS LCD, 5.0", 1280 × 720 (HD), 16:9, 294 ppi
- Connectivity: microUSB 2.0, 3.5 mm jack, Bluetooth 4.0 (A2DP, LE), FM radio, Wi-Fi 802.11 b/g/n (Wi-Fi Direct (Y6 II Compact), hotspot), GPS, A-GPS, GLONASS (Y6 II Compact)
- Other: Proximity sensor, accelerometer, compass

The Huawei Y6 II Compact is a mid-range smartphone developed by Huawei and part of Y series, which is a smaller version of the Huawei Y6 II. It was introduced in September 2016. In some countries it was sold and rebranded as the Honor 5A.

== Specifcations ==
=== Display ===
Both phones have a 5-inch IPS LCD at HD (1280 × 720; 16:9) with 294 pixels per inch.

=== Hardware ===
For the main processor, The Y6 II Compact is powered by the MediaTek MT6735, while the Honor 5A is powered by the MT6735P. Both phones are equipped with the Mali-T720MP2 GPU.

Both smartphones feature a 13 MP wide-angle main camera (f/2.0) and a 5 MP front camera. Both the main and front can record a video with a resolution of 720p aat 30 fps.

Both the Y6 II Compact and Honor 5A were only sold in 2 GB RAM and 16 GB internal memory.

=== Software ===
The smartphones were released on EMUI 3.1 (Android 5.1 Lollipop) and updated to EMUI 4 (Android 6.0 Marshmallow).
