= Honor Magic 6 Pro =

2024 flagship smartphone from Honor

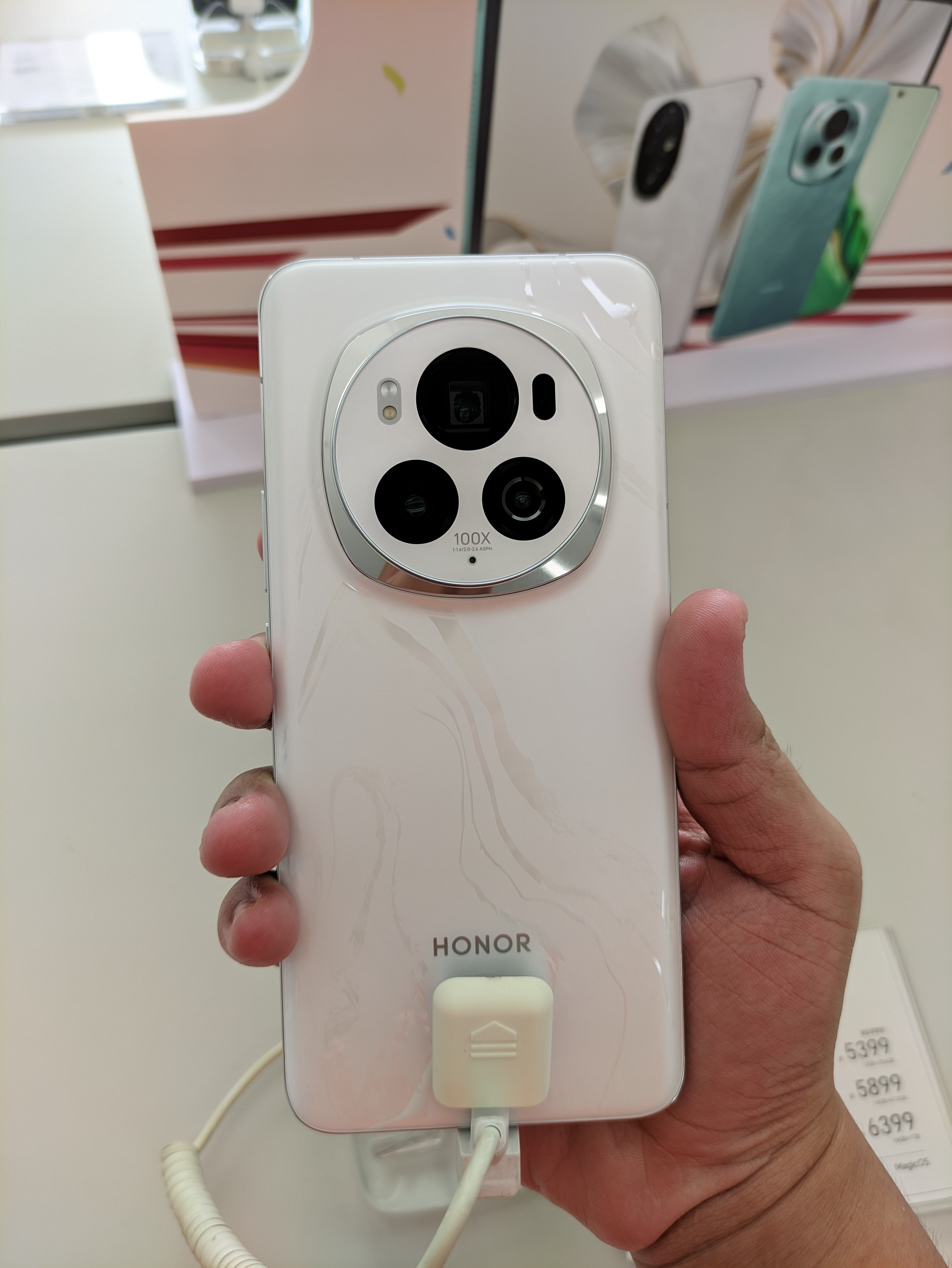
- Honor Magic 6 Pro
- Developer: Honor
- Manufacturer: Honor
- Type: Smartphone
- Series: Magic Series
- First released: January 18, 2024; 2 years ago
- Predecessor: Honor Magic 5 Pro
- Compatible networks: GSM / CDMA / HSPA / CDMA2000 / LTE / 5G
- Form factor: Slate
- Colors: Black; Green; Blue; Purple; White
- Dimensions: 162.5 mm × 75.8 mm × 8.9 mm (6.40 in × 2.98 in × 0.35 in)
- Weight: 225 g (8 oz) or 229 g
- Operating system: Android 14 with MagicOS 8
- System-on-chip: Qualcomm Snapdragon 8 Gen 3 (4 nm)
- CPU: Octa-core (1x3.3 GHz Cortex-X4 & 3x3.2 GHz Cortex-A720 & 2x3.0 GHz Cortex-A720 & 2x2.3 GHz Cortex-A520)
- GPU: Adreno 750
- Memory: 12 GB or 16 GB LPDDR5X
- Storage: 256 GB, 512 GB, or 1 TB UFS 4.0
- SIM: Nano-SIM + eSIM; Nano-SIM + Nano-SIM
- Battery: 5600 mAh Si/C Li-Ion
- Charging: 80W wired; 66W wireless; Reverse wireless; 5W reverse wired
- Rear camera: 50 MP, f/1.4–2.0, 23 mm (wide), PDAF, OIS; 180 MP, f/2.6 (periscope telephoto), PDAF, OIS, 2.5x optical zoom; 50 MP, f/2.0, 13 mm (ultrawide), AF; Laser AF, color spectrum sensor, LED flash, HDR, panorama; 4K@24/30/60fps, 1080p@30/60/120/240fps, HDR, 10-bit video, gyro-EIS, OIS
- Front camera: 50 MP, f/2.0, 22 mm (wide), AF; TOF 3D (depth/biometrics sensor): 4K@30fps, 1080p@30/60fps, gyro-EIS
- Display: 6.8 in (170 mm) LTPO OLED, 1B colors 1280 × 2800 px @ 120 Hz; Dolby Vision, HDR; 1600 nits (HBM), 5000 nits (peak); NanoCrystal Shield
- Sound: Stereo speakers
- Connectivity: Wi-Fi 802.11 a/b/g/n/ac/6/7 Bluetooth 5.3 (A2DP, LE, aptX HD); NFC; Infrared port USB Type-C 3.2, DisplayPort 1.2, OTG; GPS (L1+L5), GLONASS, BDS, Galileo
- Water resistance: IP68 dust/water resistant (up to 1.5 m for 30 mins)

The Honor Magic 6 Pro is an Android-based smartphone developed and manufactured by Honor. It was announced on January 11, 2024, and released on January 18, 2024. It is part of the Magic Series and follows the Honor Magic 5 Pro.

== Specifications ==
=== Display ===
The Honor Magic 6 Pro features a 6.8-inch LTPO OLED display with a resolution of 1280 × 2800 pixels and a 19.5:9 aspect ratio. The display supports 120 Hz refresh rate, Dolby Vision, and HDR. It reaches up to 1600 nits brightness in high brightness mode (HBM) and a peak brightness of 5000 nits. The screen-to-body ratio is approximately 91.1%.

=== Performance ===
The phone is equipped with the Qualcomm Snapdragon 8 Gen 3 processor built on a 4 nm process. It includes an octa-core CPU and an Adreno 750 GPU. RAM options include 12 GB and 16 GB LPDDR5X, with storage configurations of 256 GB, 512 GB, and 1 TB using UFS 4.0. There is no memory card slot.

==== Benchmark results ====
- AnTuTu v10: 2,020,000
- Geekbench v6: 6787
- 3DMark Wild Life Extreme: 5254

=== Camera ===
The rear camera system includes:

- 50 MP main sensor (Omnivision OVH9000), f/1.4–2.0, 23 mm, PDAF, OIS
- 180 MP periscope telephoto sensor (Samsung ISOCELL HP3), f/2.6, PDAF, OIS, 2.5x optical zoom
- 50 MP ultrawide (Samsung S5KJN1), f/2.0, 13 mm, autofocus

Rear video capabilities include 4K at 24/30/60 fps and 1080p at up to 240 fps, with support for HDR, 10-bit color, OIS, and gyro-EIS. Features include laser autofocus, color spectrum sensor, and LED flash.

The front camera includes a 50 MP wide sensor (f/2.0) with autofocus, accompanied by a TOF 3D sensor for depth mapping and biometric security. Video recording is supported at 4K@30fps and 1080p@30/60fps.

=== Build ===
The phone features a curved-edge display and is available in glass or eco-leather back finishes. The frame is made of metal. The device is rated IP68 for dust and water resistance (up to 1.5 meters for 30 minutes). Water damage is not covered by warranty.

=== Battery ===
The Magic 6 Pro includes a 5600 mAh silicon-carbon battery. Supported charging options:

- 80 W wired charging (PD3.0)
- 66 W wireless charging
- Reverse wireless charging
- 5 W reverse wired charging

Measured battery endurance yields an active use score of 14 hours and 6 minutes.

=== Connectivity ===
Connectivity options include Wi-Fi 7, Bluetooth 5.3, NFC, infrared, GPS (L1+L5), GLONASS, BDS, and Galileo. USB Type-C 3.2 is supported, with DisplayPort 1.2 and OTG.

== Software ==
The phone ships with Android 14 and MagicOS 8. Honor has confirmed support for 4 major Android upgrades and 5 years of security updates.
