= Honor Magic8 Lite =

2026 smartphone model

The Honor Magic8 Lite is an Android-based mid-range smartphone manufactured by Honor. It was officially announced in January 2026. The device is noted for its durability ratings and high-capacity battery.

== Technical Specifications ==
=== Hardware ===
The Honor Magic8 Lite is powered by the Qualcomm Snapdragon 6 Gen 4 SoC, featuring an octa-core CPU. It comes with 8 GB of RAM and 512 GB of internal storage.

=== Display ===
It features a 6.79-inch OLED display supporting 1.07 billion colors and a 1.5K ultra-high resolution. The screen supports a 120 Hz refresh rate, 3840 Hz PWM dimming, and has a peak brightness of 6000 nits.

=== Camera ===
The rear camera setup includes a 108 MP ultra-light-sensitive main sensor with Optical Image Stabilization (OIS), featuring a large 1/1.67-inch sensor size.

=== Battery ===
The device is equipped with a 7,500 mAh Li-ion polymer battery and supports 66 W wired fast charging.
