= Huawei Y3 =

Android smartphone by Huawei

Huawei Y3 (Huawei Y360)
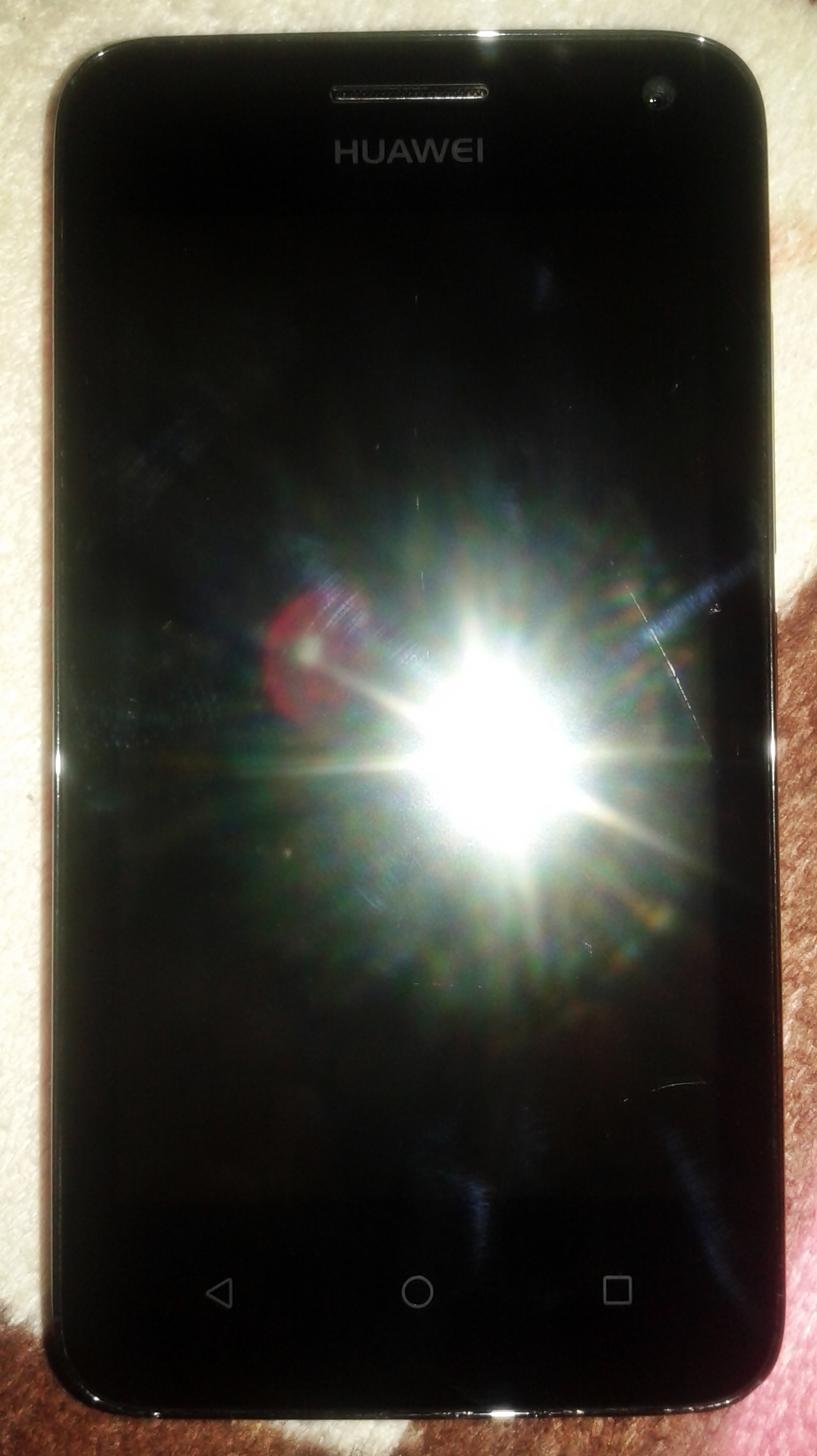
- Manufacturer: Huawei
- Series: Huawei Y series
- First released: June 2015
- Successor: Huawei Y3 II
- Related: Huawei Y5; Huawei Y6
- Compatible networks: GSM, 3G, 4G (LTE)
- Colors: Black, White
- Dimensions: 122.6×63.8×10.9 mm (4.83×2.51×0.43 in)
- Weight: 118 g (4.2 oz)
- Operating system: Android 4.4.2 KitKat + EMUI Lite 3
- System-on-chip: Mediatek MT6582 (28 nm)
- CPU: Quad-core 1.2 GHz Cortex-A7
- GPU: Mali-400MP2
- Memory: 512 MB; LPDDR2
- Storage: 4 GB; eMMC 4.5
- SIM: Mini-SIM or Dual-SIM (Mini-SIM + Micro-SIM)
- Battery: Li-Po 1730 mAh, removable
- Rear camera: 5 MP; 2-LED flash Video: 720p @30fps
- Front camera: 2 MP
- Display: IPS LCD

The Huawei Y3, also known as Huawei Y360, is an Android smartphone developed by Huawei and it belongs to the Y series. It was announced in March 2015 and released in June 2015.

== Specifications ==
=== Design ===
The screen is made of glass. The phone case is made of plastic. The microphone is located at the bottom.

The 3.5mm audio and microUSB connectors are located at the top. The volume control buttons and the smartphone lock button are located on the right side. The speaker and the second microphone are located on the back panel, which can be removed. The slots, depending on the model, for 1 Mini-SIM card and a card or 2 Mini-SIM cards and a Micro-SIM card and memory card are located under the case.

The smartphone was sold in black and white colors. It is also possible to replace the back panel of one color with another.

=== Processor ===
The smartphone was powered by a quad-core MediaTek MT6582 processor with a Mali-400MP2 graphics processing unit.

=== Battery ===
The Huawei Y3 has a 1730 mAh battery, and it is also possible to replace it.

=== Camera ===
The smartphone has a single 5 MP main camera. The front camera has a resolution of 2 MP.

=== Display ===
The display has a 4", 854 × 480 with an aspect ratio of 16:9 and a pixel density of 245 ppi.

=== Memory ===
The smartphone was featured in a configuration with 512 MB of RAM and 8 GB of built-in memory, which can be expanded using a microSD memory card up to 32 GB.

== Software ==
=== Operating system ===
The Huawei Y3 runs on Android 4.4.2 (KitKat) with EMUI Lite 3.
