= Huawei Y3 (2017) =

Smartphone model

- Manufacturer: Huawei
- Type: Smartphone
- Series: Huawei Y
- First released: September 2017
- Predecessor: Huawei Y3 II
- Successor: Huawei Y3 (2018)
- Related: Huawei Y5 (2017); Huawei Y6 (2017); Huawei Y7
- Compatible networks: GSM, 3G, LTE
- Form factor: Monoblock
- Colors: Gold, Pink, Blue, White, Gray
- Dimensions: 145.1×73.7×9.5 mm (5.71×2.90×0.37 in)
- Weight: 175 g (6.2 oz)
- Operating system: Android 6.0 Marshmallow, EMUI 4.1 Mini
- System-on-chip: Mediatek MT6737М; Mediatek MT6580M - CRO-U00
- CPU: Quad-core 1.1 GHz Cortex-A53; Quad-core 1.3 GHz Cortex-A7 - CRO-U00
- GPU: Mali-T720MP2; Mali-400MP2 - CRO-U00
- Memory: 1GB RAM; Memory card: microSDXC
- Storage: 8GB
- SIM: Dual SIM (Micro-SIM, dual stand-by)
- Battery: Li-Ion 2200 mAh, non-removable
- Rear camera: 8 MP, f/2.0, AF, LED flash Video: 720p@30fps
- Front camera: 2 MP
- Display: Size: 5" IPS; Resolution: 480 × 854 (196 ppi density); 16:9 ratio
- Connectivity: WLAN: Wi-Fi 802.11 b/g/n, hotspot Bluetooth: 4.0, A2DP

The Huawei Y3 (2017) (stylized as HUAWEI Y3 2017) is an Android smartphone from the Huawei Y series developed by Huawei. It was introduced by in June 2017 and later released in September 2017.

The Huawei Y3 (2017) is a budget smartphone from Huawei that serves as a successor to the Huawei Y3 II. The device has a plastic body.

It's available in 5 colors: Blue, White, Gold, Gray, and Pink.

== Specifications ==
The smartphone has two modifications, which are built on different processors:

- The MediaTek MT6737M is a quad-core Cortex-A53 processor operating at a clock speed of 1.1 GHz.
- The MediaTek MT6580M is a quad-core Cortex-A7 processor with a frequency of 1.3 GHz

The Huawei Y3 (2017) has a 1GB of RAM. It comes with 8GB of internal storage, which can be expanded up to 128GB using a microSD card.

On the back of the phone, there is an 8MP camera. On the front, there is a 2-megapixel camera.

The smartphone has a 5-inch IPS display with a multi-touch sensor. The resolution is 480 x 854 pixels with a 16:9 aspect ratio.

The phone has a rechargeable battery with a capacity of 2200 mAh.

== Software ==
The Huawei Y3 2017 runs on the Android 6.0 Marshmallow operating system with the EMUI 4.1 Mini interface.

The Huawei Y3 (2017) supports the following network standards: GSM/GPRS/EDGE (850, 900, 1800, 1900 MHz), HSDPA (850, 900, 2100 MHz), LTE (2100, 800, 1800, 2600, 900 VOLTE).

The phone supports the wireless interfaces: Wi-Fi 802.11b/g/n (2.4 GHz), Bluetooth 4.0 LE.
