= Honor GT =

2024 smartphone by Honor

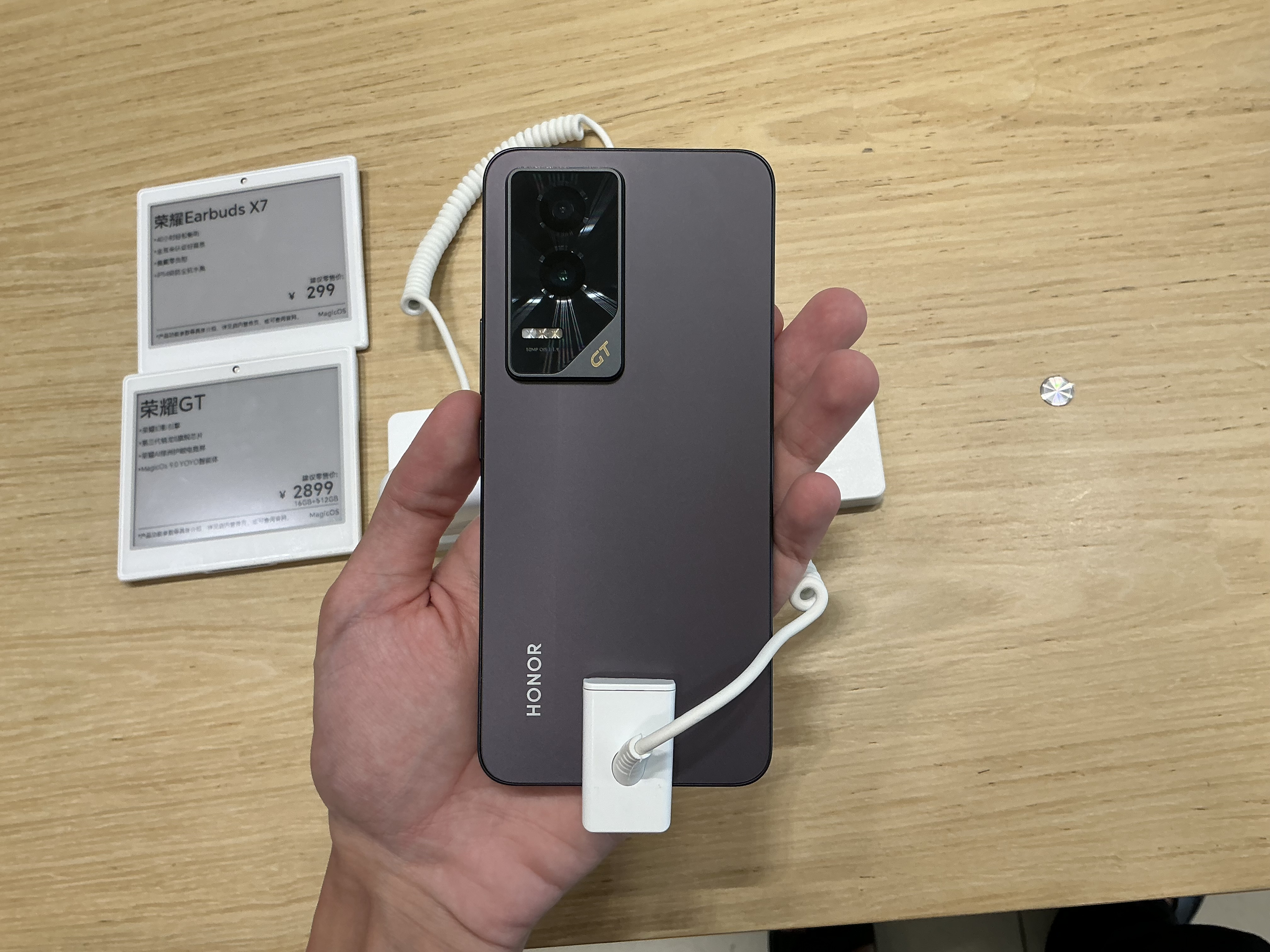
- Honor GT (rear side)
- Developer: Honor
- Manufacturer: Honor
- Type: Smartphone
- Series: Honor GT series
- First released: December 17, 2024; 18 months ago
- Predecessor: Honor 90 GT
- Successor: Honor Win RT
- Related: Honor GT Pro
- Compatible networks: GSM / HSPA / LTE / 5G
- Form factor: Slate
- Colors: Black; White; Green
- Dimensions: 161 mm × 74.2 mm × 7.7 mm (6.34 in × 2.92 in × 0.30 in)
- Weight: 196 g (6.9 oz)
- Operating system: Android 15 with MagicOS 9
- System-on-chip: Qualcomm Snapdragon 8 Gen 3 (4 nm)
- CPU: Octa-core (1x3.3 GHz Cortex-X4 & 3x3.2 GHz Cortex-A720 & 2x3.0 GHz Cortex-A720 & 2x2.3 GHz Cortex-A520)
- GPU: Adreno 750
- Memory: 12 GB or 16 GB LPDDR5X
- Storage: 256 GB, 512 GB, or 1 TB UFS 4.0
- SIM: Nano-SIM + Nano-SIM
- Battery: 5300 mAh Si/C Li-Ion
- Charging: 100W wired (60% in 15 min); 5W reverse wired
- Rear camera: 50 MP, f/1.95 (wide), Sony IMX906, 1/1.56", PDAF, OIS; 12 MP, f/2.2, 112° (ultrawide), AF; Rear: 4K, 1080p, gyro-EIS, OIS
- Front camera: 16 MP, f/2.5 (wide): Front: 1080p, gyro-EIS, HDR
- Display: 6.7 in (170 mm) AMOLED, 1B colors 1200 × 2664 px @ 120 Hz; HDR, 1200 nits (HBM), 4000 nits (peak)
- Sound: Stereo speakers, Honor Histen 7.3, Dolby Atmos
- Connectivity: Wi-Fi 6 and 7 (802.11a/b/g/n/ac/6/7); Bluetooth 5.3 (A2DP, LE, aptX HD); NFC; Infrared port USB-C 2.0 OTG; GPS (L1+L5), GLONASS, BDS, Galileo
- Water resistance: IP65 dust tight and water resistant (low-pressure water jets)
- Other: Under-display fingerprint, ultrasound proximity, no microSD, no 3.5mm jack
- Website: Official Website (in Chinese)

Honor GT is an Android-based smartphone developed and manufactured by Honor. It was released on December 17, 2024. A higher-end model, the Honor GT Pro, launched on April 23, 2025 with a larger battery and a Snapdragon 8 Elite chip rather than one from Gen 3.

== Specifications ==
=== Display ===
The device features a 6.7-inch AMOLED display with a resolution of 1200 × 2664 pixels and a pixel density of approximately 436 ppi. It supports HDR, a refresh rate of 120 Hz, and displays up to 1 billion colors. Brightness reaches 1200 nits in high brightness mode (HBM) and peaks at 4000 nits. The screen-to-body ratio is approximately 90.3%. An under-display optical fingerprint sensor is integrated into the screen.

=== Performance ===
Honor GT is powered by the Qualcomm Snapdragon 8 Gen 3 (4 nm) SoC. It includes an 8-core CPU and an Adreno 750 GPU. The device is available with either 12 GB or 16 GB of LPDDR5X RAM and comes in storage configurations of 256 GB, 512 GB, or 1 TB using UFS 4.0. There is no microSD card slot. In benchmark testing, the device scored approximately 2,120,000 in the AnTuTu performance test. It includes a thermal management system to regulate temperature under load.

=== Camera ===
The rear camera setup includes a 50 MP wide-angle primary sensor (Sony IMX906, f/1.95, 1/1.56") with phase-detection autofocus (PDAF) and optical image stabilization (OIS), and a 12 MP ultrawide camera (f/2.2, 112° field of view, autofocus). Video recording is supported at 4K and 1080p resolutions with gyro-EIS and OIS. The front camera is 16 MP (f/2.5) and supports HDR and 1080p video.

=== Build and durability ===
The device has a plastic body and slate form factor. It carries an IP65 rating, providing protection against dust ingress and low-pressure water jets. Water damage is not covered under standard warranty, consistent with typical IP-rated consumer devices.

=== Audio ===
The device includes stereo speakers and supports Dolby Atmos audio processing. It does not include a 3.5 mm headphone jack.

=== Connectivity ===
The Honor GT supports dual SIM (Nano-SIM), Wi-Fi 6 and Wi-Fi 7 (802.11 a/b/g/n/ac/6/7), Bluetooth 5.3 with A2DP, LE, and aptX HD, NFC, infrared port, and USB Type-C 2.0 with OTG support. Satellite positioning includes GPS (L1+L5), GLONASS, BeiDou (BDS), and Galileo.

=== Battery ===
The battery has a capacity of 5300 mAh (Si/C Li-Ion). It supports 100 W wired fast charging (up to 60% in 15 minutes under optimal conditions) and 5 W reverse wired charging. Wireless charging is not supported.

== Software ==
The Honor GT ships with Android 15 and MagicOS 9. Honor has not publicly disclosed the official software update policy for this device.
