= Accessory =

Accessory may refer to:

- Accessory (legal term), a person who assists a criminal

== In anatomy ==
- Accessory bone
- Accessory breast
- Accessory kidney
- Accessory muscle
- Accessory nucleus, in anatomy, a cranial nerve nucleus
- Accessory nerve
- Accessory spleen

== In arts and entertainment ==
- Accessory (band), with members Dirk Steyer and Ivo Lottig
- Video game accessory, a piece of hardware used in conjunction with a video game console for playing video games
- Accessories (album), a compilation album from Dutch alternative rock band The Gathering
- Accessory, a type of rulebook in Dungeons & Dragons and other role-playing games

== Other uses ==
- Fashion accessory, an item used to complement a fashion or style
- Accessory suite, a secondary dwelling on a parcel of land
- Rental accessories and attachments, accessories used in the rental industry
- Cable accessories for connecting and terminating cables
- Accessory fruit, in which some of the flesh is derived from tissues other than the flower ovary
- Accessories After the Fact, a 1967 book by Sylvia Meagher

== See also ==
- Access (disambiguation)
