= Huawei P9 lite =

Huawei smartphone

Huawei P9 lite (Huawei G9 lite; Honor 8 Smart in India)
- Brand: Huawei, Honor
- Manufacturer: Huawei
- Type: Smartphone
- Series: Huawei P/G; Honor N
- First released: April 20, 2016; 10 years ago
- Predecessor: Huawei P8 lite
- Successor: Huawei P10 lite Huawei P9 lite 2017
- Related: Huawei P9; Huawei P9 lite mini Huawei Nova lite Huawei G9 Plus; Honor 8
- Compatible networks: GSM, 3G, LTE
- Form factor: Slate
- Dimensions: 146.8×72.6×7.5 mm (5.78×2.86×0.30 in)
- Weight: 147 g (5 oz)
- Operating system: Initial: Android 6.0 Marshmallow + EMUI 4.1; Current: Android 7.0 Nougat + EMUI 5
- CPU: HiSilicon Kirin 650 (16 nm), 8 cores (4x2.0 GHz Cortex-A53 & 4x1.7 GHz Cortex-A53)
- GPU: Mali-T830 MP2
- Memory: 2/3 GB, LPDDR3
- Storage: 16 GB, eMMC 5.1
- Removable storage: MicroSD up to 128 GB
- Battery: Non-removable, Li-Ion 3000 mAh
- Charging: 10 W
- Rear camera: 13 MP Sony IMX214, f/2.0, 1/3.1", 1.12μm, AF; LED flash, HDR, panorama Video: 1080p@30fps
- Front camera: 8 MP, f/2.0 Video: 1080p@30fps\
- Display: IPS LCD, 5.2", 1920 × 1080 (FullHD), 16:9, 424 ppi
- Connectivity: MicroUSB 2.0, 3.5 mm audio, Bluetooth 4.1 (A2DP, LE), NFC, Wi-Fi 802.11 b/g/n (Wi-Fi Direct, hotspot), GPS, A-GPS, GLONASS
- Other: Fingerprint scanner (rear-mounted), proximity sensor, ambient light sensor, accelerometer, compass

Huawei P9 lite is a smartphone developed by Huawei as a simplified version of the Huawei P9. It was unveiled on April 20, 2016.

In some countries, the smartphone was sold as the Huawei G9 lite, while in India, it was introduced under the Honor sub-brand as the Honor 8 Smart.

== Design ==
The screen is made of glass. The frame is made of aluminum. The back panel is made of plastic with a glass insert at the top.

At the bottom, there is a microUSB connector, a speaker, and a microphone styled to resemble a speaker. On top, there is a 3.5 mm audio jack and a second microphone. On the left side, depending on the version, there is either a single SIM card slot or a hybrid slot for two SIM cards or one SIM card and a microSD memory card up to 128 GB. On the right side, there are volume buttons and the smartphone's power/lock button. The fingerprint scanner is located on the back panel.

The Huawei P9 lite was sold in 3 colors: Black, White, and Gold.

== Technical specifications ==
=== Platform ===
The smartphone is powered by a HiSilicon Kirin 650 processor and a Mali-T830 MP2 GPU.

=== Battery ===
All smartphones come with a battery capacity of 3000 mAh.

=== Camera ===
The smartphone features a 13 MP, f/2.0 main camera with autofocus and 1080p@30fps video recording capabilities. The front camera is 8 MP, with an f/2.0 aperture and 1080p@30fps video recording capabilities.

=== Display ===
The phone's display is an IPS LCD 5.2-inch FullHD (1920 × 1080) panel with a pixel density of 424 ppi and a 16:9 aspect ratio.

=== Storage ===
The smartphone was sold in 2/16 GB and 3/16 GB configurations. Only the 3/16 GB version was available in Ukraine.

=== Software ===
The smartphone was launched with EMUI 4.1 based on Android 6.0 Marshmallow. It was later updated to EMUI 5 based on Android 7.0 Nougat.

== Reception ==
A reviewer from the information portal ITC.ua gave the Huawei P9 Lite 4 out of 5 points. The reviewer cited the hybrid slot, 16 GB of internal memory, and the fact that the model was released too late (as there were better offerings from competitors at the time) as drawbacks. On the positive side, the reviewer praised the decent screen, cameras, acceptable performance, good speakers, and glove mode.

A reviewer from the information website New Voice gave the Huawei P9 Lite 6 out of 10 points. In conclusion, the reviewer described the smartphone with the words "Quite a significant price and quite average capabilities."
