= Huawei Y5 (2017) =

2017 Android smartphone model

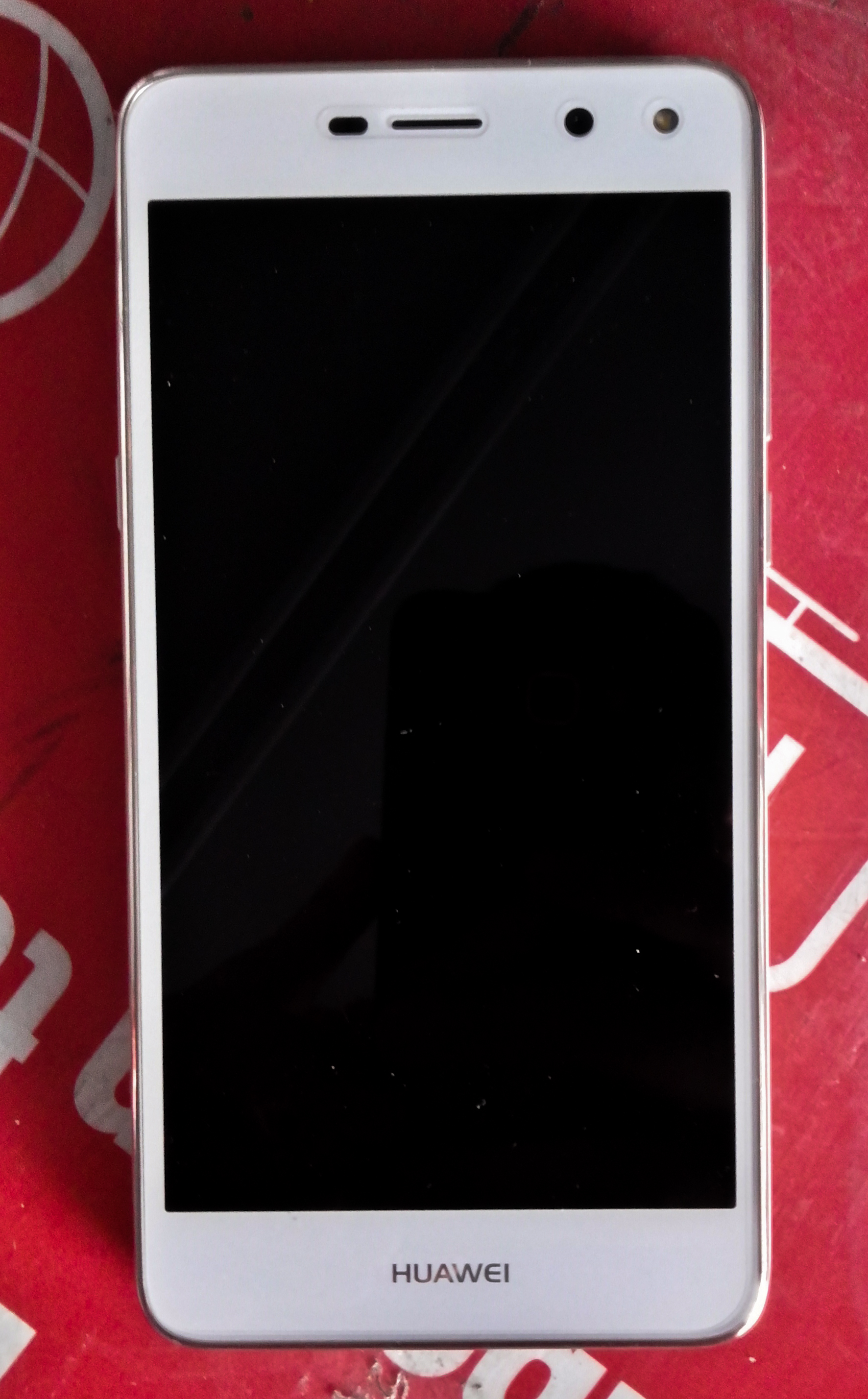
- Brand: Huawei
- Manufacturer: Huawei
- Series: Huawei Y
- First released: June 2017
- Predecessor: Huawei Y5 II
- Successor: Huawei Y5 (2018)
- Related: Huawei Y3 (2017); Huawei Y6 (2017); Huawei Y7
- Compatible networks: 3G/2G
- Colors: Gold, Pink, Blue, White, Gray
- Dimensions: 143,8 х 72 х 8,35 mm
- Weight: 150 g (5.3 oz)
- Operating system: Android 6.0 (Marshmallow), EMUI 4.1
- System-on-chip: MediaTek MT6580M (28 mm)
- CPU: Quad-core 1.4 GHz Cortex-A53
- GPU: Mali-T720MP2
- Memory: 2GB RAM
- Storage: 16GB eMMC 5.0
- Battery: Li-Ion 3000 mAh, non-removable
- Rear camera: Single 8 MP, f/2.0, AF, with Dual-LED flash, panorama Video: 1080p@30fps
- Front camera: 5 MP, LED flash Video: 720p@30fps
- Display: 5" (IPS); Resolution: 720 x 1280 pixels, 18:9 ratio (~294 ppi density)
- Connectivity: WLAN: Wi-Fi 802.11 b/g/n, hotspot Bluetooth: 4.0, A2DP, LE

The Huawei Y5 (2017) is an Android smartphone from the Y series manufactured and developed by Huawei. It was announced in April 2017, and was released in June.

The Huawei Y5 (2017) is a smartphone that replaced the Huawei Y5 II. It features a more capacious 3000mAh lithium-polymer battery and a slimmer, textured body that is 8.45mm thick. Another notable feature is the Easy Key function. With a simple press, double press, or hold, it can quickly access various apps or functions on the smartphone.

The Y5 (2017) has 5 color options: Gold, Pink, Blue, White, and Gray.

== Technical specifications ==
=== Processor ===
The Huawei Y5 2017 is powered by a MediaTek MT6580M processor, a quad-core 1.4 GHz. It has 4 Cortex-A7 cores clocked at 1.4 GHz. The graphics processor is ARM Mali-400 MP2.

=== Display ===
The Huawei Y5 2017 features a 5.0-inch HD glass display with a resolution of 720 x 1280 pixels. It has an aspect ratio of 18:9.

=== Memory ===
The internal memory is 16 GB, while the RAM is 2 GB with the possibility of expansion using a microSD memory card up to 128 MB.

=== Camera ===
It has an 8 MP main camera with a dual flash (aperture f/2.0) and a 5 MP front camera.

=== Battery ===
The phone's battery capacity is 3000 mAh.

== Software ==
The Huawei Y5 2017 runs on the Android 6.0 (Marshmallow) operating system with the EMUI 4.1 user interface.

The Y5 (2017) supports communication standards: 3G (WCDMA/UMTS), 2G (EDGE).

The Y5 (2017) supports wireless interfaces: Wi-Fi 802.11 b/g/n, hotspot, Bluetooth 4.0, A2DP, LE. The smartphone supports the following navigation systems: GPS, A-GPS, GLONASS. It also has an FM radio.

The Y5 (2017) supports the following audio formats: .mp3, .mid, .amr, .3gp, .mp4, .wav, .ogg.

The Y5 (2017) supports the following video formats: * .3gp, * .mp4, * .webm, * .mkv.
