= Huawei P9 =

Smartphone developed by Huawei

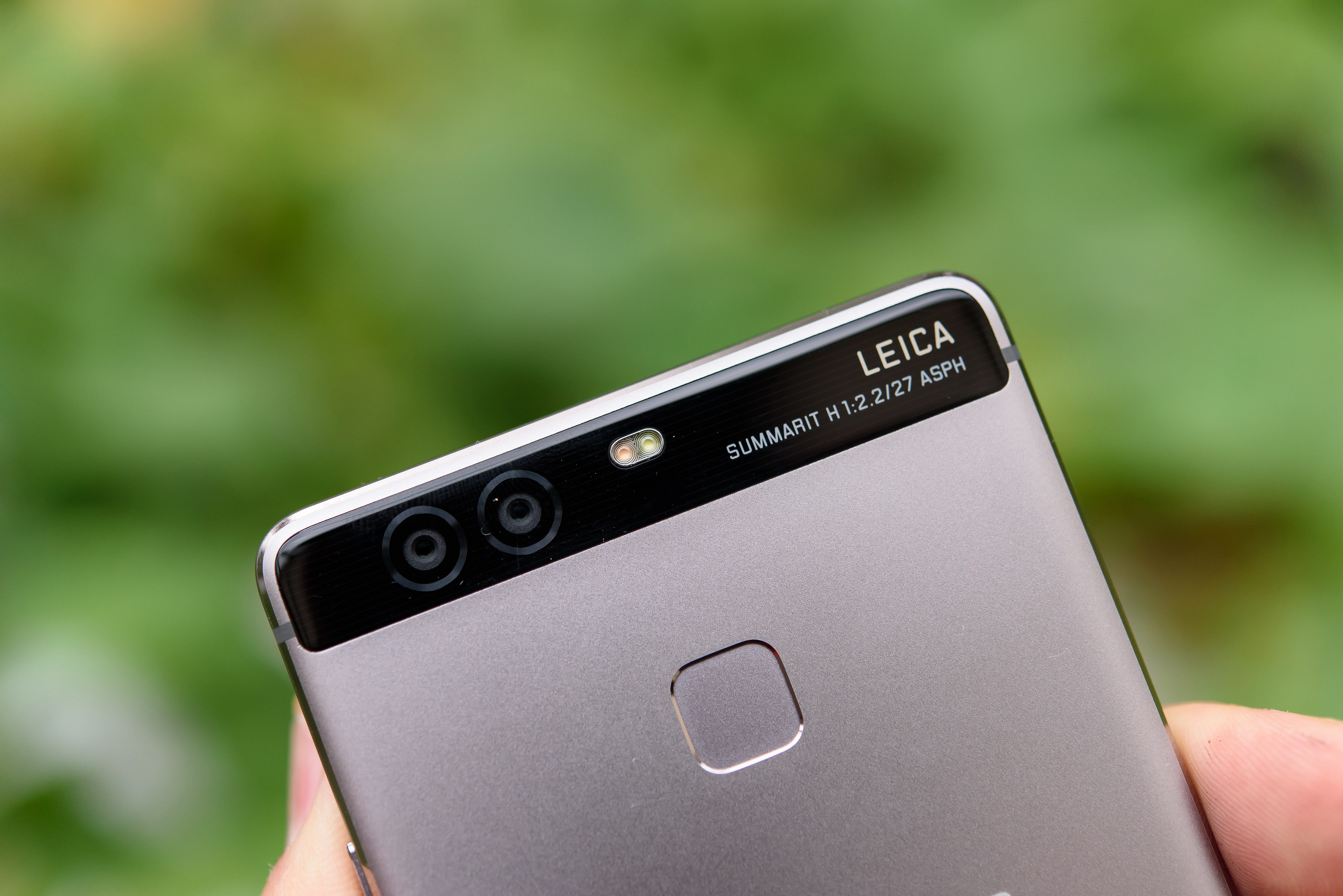
- The dual rear cameras of the Huawei P9 developed with Leica
- Manufacturer: Huawei
- Type: Smartphone
- Series: P
- First released: April 29, 2016; 10 years ago
- Availability by region: Romania; April 29, 2016; 10 years ago Malaysia; November 20, 2016; 9 years ago
- Discontinued: Yes
- Predecessor: Huawei P8
- Successor: Huawei P10
- Related: Huawei P9 lite Huawei P9 Plus
- Compatible networks: GSM 850 / 900 / 1800 / 1900 - SIM 1 & SIM 2 (dual-SIM model only); HSDPA 850 / 900 / 1700(AWS) / 1900 / 2100 - EVA-L19; HSDPA 800 / 850 / 900 / 1700(AWS) / 1800 / 1900 / 2100 - EVA-L29; LTE band 1(2100), 3(1800), 4(1700/2100), 7(2600), 20(800), 38(2600), 39(1900), 40(2300), B41 - EVA-L19; LTE band 1(2100), 2(1900), 3(1800), 4(1700/2100), 5(850), 6(900), 7(2600), 8(900), 12(700), 17(700), 18(800), 19(800), 20(800), 26(850), 38(2600), 39(1900), 40(2300), B41 - EVA-L29; LTE band 1(2100), 2(1900), 3(1800), 4(1700/2100), 5(850), 6(900), 7(2600), 8(900), 12(700), 17(700), 18(800), 19(800), 20(800), 26(850), 28(700), 38(2600), 39(1900), 40(2300) - EVA-L09
- Dimensions: 145 mm (5.7 in) H 70.9 mm (2.79 in) W 7 mm (0.28 in) D
- Weight: 144 g (5.1 oz)
- Operating system: Original: Android 6.0 (Marshmallow) EMUI 4 Current: Android 7.0 (Nougat) EMUI 5
- System-on-chip: HiSilicon Kirin 955
- CPU: Quad-core 2.5 GHz Cortex-A72 & quad-core 1.8 GHz Cortex-A53
- GPU: Mali-T880 MP4
- Memory: 3/4 GB RAM
- Storage: 32/64 GB
- Removable storage: microSD, up to 128 GB (uses SIM 2 slot)
- SIM: nanoSIM
- Battery: Non-removable 3000 mAh lithium polymer battery
- Charging: Supercharge
- Rear camera: Dual 12 MP, f/2.2, 27 mm Stereo camera, Leica optics, Contrast autofocus, dual-LED (dual tone) flash
- Front camera: 8 MP, f/2.4, 1080p
- Display: 5.2" 1080 x 1920 pixels IPS-NEO LCD capacitive multitouch display, 16M colors, Corning Gorilla Glass 3 Protection
- External display: None
- Connectivity: Wi-Fi 802.11 a/b/g/n/ac, dual-band, DLNA, WiFi Direct, hotspot Bluetooth v4.2, A2DP, LE; GPS Yes, with A-GPS, GLONASS/ BDS (market dependent); USB Type-C 1.0 reversible connector
- Model: EVA-L09 (Single SIM); EVA-L19, EVA-L29 (Dual SIM Full Active); EVA-AL10, EVA-AL00, EVA-CL00, EVA-TL00, EVA-DL00(China mainland edition)
- Website: consumer.huawei.com/en/mobile-phones/p9/

The Huawei P9 is an Android smartphone produced by Huawei and was released in 2016. It is the successor to the Huawei P8 and maintains almost the same design but has a dual camera setup in the back co-engineered with Leica along with a rear fingerprint sensor. The Huawei P9 has a 5.2-inch Full HD IPS-NEO LCD and runs on Android 6.0 Marshmallow OS.

== Release ==
The P9 was released in April 2016 in London and in August 2016 in India.

== New features ==
The P9 added a fingerprint sensor, and was the first Huawei smartphone with a camera co-engineered with Leica under a partnership announced in February 2016. The camera system integrates images from dual rear camera sensors, one monochrome, the other three-colour, which makes possible greater contrast, better low-light images, and shallow depth of field effects, and also refocusing after image capture. Storing two versions of images increases memory use, so there is also a microSD slot to increase storage capacity. Huawei P9 Plus became the second smartphone with a pressure-sensitive screen.

== Variants ==
The Huawei P9 Plus, released in May 2016, has 4 GB RAM, and storage of 64 GB.

The Huawei P9 lite, released in May 2016 and also marketed as the Honor 8 Smart, has 2/3 GB RAM and storage of 16 GB.

== Reception ==
It was globally well received. Some regarded the P9 as a copy of the design of the iPhone 6, since it also uses pentalobe screws.
