= Huawei Y5 II =

2016 Android smartphone model

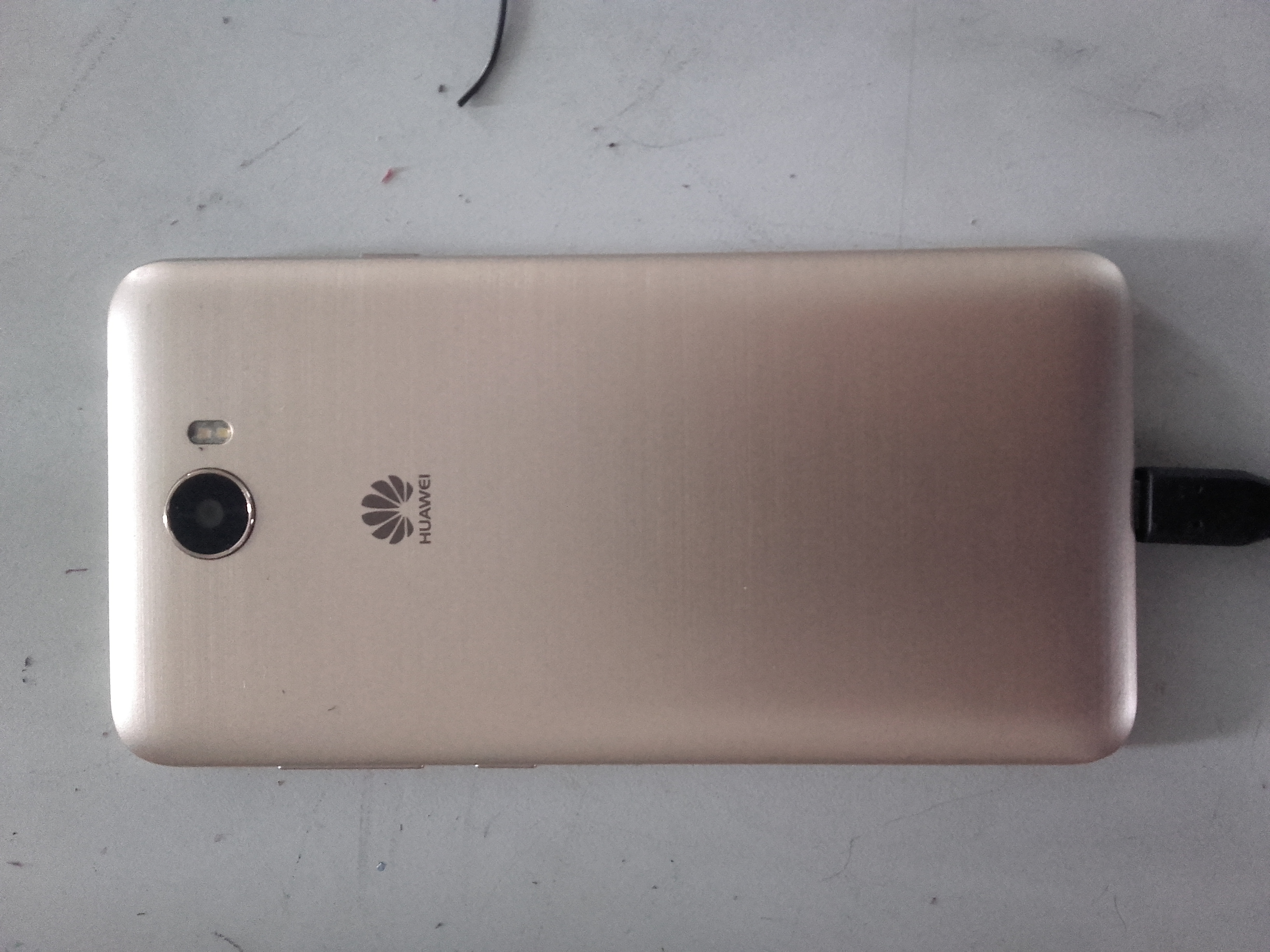
- Manufacturer: Huawei
- Type: Smartphone
- Series: Huawei Y
- First released: June 2016
- Predecessor: Huawei Y5
- Successor: Huawei Y5 (2017)
- Related: Huawei Y3 II; Huawei Y6 II
- Compatible networks: 2G/3G
- Colors: Obsidian Black, Arctic White, Sand Gold, Rose Pink, Sky Blue
- Dimensions: 143.8 х 72 х 8.9 mm
- Weight: 135 g (5 oz)
- Operating system: Android 5.1 (Lollipop)
- System-on-chip: MediaTek MT6582; Quad-core 1.3 GHz
- Memory: 1 GB RAM; Card slot: microSD, up to 32 GB; dedicated slot
- Storage: 8 GB
- Battery: Li-Po 2200 mAh, removable
- Rear camera: 8 MP, AF, f/2.0, with LED flash Video: 720p@30fps
- Front camera: 2 MP with LED flash
- Display: 5" (IPS), 5.0 inches Size: 68.9 cm² (~66.6% screen-to-body ratio); Resolution: 720 x 1280 pixels, 16:9 ratio (~294 ppi density)
- Connectivity: Wi-Fi 802.11 b/g/n, hotspot

The Huawei Y5 II is an Android phone developed from the company Huawei. It was announced in April 2016 and released in June of the same year.

Huawei Y5 II was also released under the names Huawei Y5 2 and Huawei Honor 5.

The Huawei Y5 II is a smartphone that replaced the Huawei Y5 and features a larger screen of 5 inches.

The Huawei Y5 II was positioned with a starting price of $165.

== Design ==
The body is made of plastic, with the back cover designed to mimic the look of metal. On the left side of the body, there's a 'smart button' that can be customized to preferences.

The phone is 8.9 mm thick, 72 mm wide, 143.8 mm tall, and weighs 135 grams.

The smartphone is available in 5 colors: Obsidian Black, Arctic White, Rose Pink, Sky Blue, and Sand Gold.

== Specifications and hardware ==
The Huawei Y5 II powers with the MediaTek MT6582 processor. It has a quad-core Cortex-A7 CPU running at 1.3 GHz. The graphics processing unit is an ARM Mali-400 MP2.

The phone has a 5-inch IPS screen. The resolution is 720 x 1280. The aspect ratio is 16:9.

The Huawei Y5 II's processor has 8GB of internal storage, which can be expanded up to 32GB. The RAM is 1GB.

The main camera is 8 MP with dual LED flash and autofocus, while the front camera is 2 MP with LED flash.

The phone's battery capacity is 2200 mAh.

== Software ==
The Huawei Y5 II runs on the Android 5.1 (Lollipop) operating system with the EMUI 3.1 user interface.

The phone supports communication standards: 3G (WCDMA/UMTS), 2G (EDGE).

The phone supports wireless interfaces: Wi-Fi 802.11 b/g/n with hotspot, and Bluetooth 4.0, A2DP, LE.

The phone supports navigation systems: A-GPS. Has FM radio.

The phone supports the following audio formats: AAC, AMR-NB, and PCM.

The phone supports the following video formats: MP4, H.264, H.263.
