= Huawei Y5 =

2015 Android smartphone model

Huawei Y5 (Huawei Y560)
- Manufacturer: Huawei
- Type: Smartphone
- Series: Huawei Y series
- First released: June 2015
- Successor: Huawei Y5 II
- Related: Huawei Y3; Huawei Y6
- Compatible networks: GSM, 3G, 4G (LTE)
- Colors: Black, White, Pink, Blue
- Dimensions: 135,9 × 67,7 × 10 mm
- Weight: 141.5 g (5 oz)
- Operating system: Android 5.1 (Lollipop), EMUI Lite 3.1
- System-on-chip: Qualcomm MSM8909 Snapdragon 210
- CPU: 4×1,1 GHz Cortex-A7
- GPU: Adreno 304
- Storage: Internal: 8GB; RAM: 1GB
- SIM: Single SIM (Micro-SIM) or Dual SIM (Micro-SIM)
- Battery: Li-Ion 2000 mAh, removable
- Rear camera: Single 5 MP, AF; Video: 720p@30fps
- Front camera: 2 MP
- Display: IPS LCD, 4.5", 854 × 480, 16:9, 218 ppi

The Huawei Y5 (also known as Huawei Y560) is an Android smartphone manufactured and developed by Huawei. It was announced and released in June 2015 and it belongs to the Huawei Y series.

== Design ==
The phone's screen is made of glass. The phone case is made of plastic.

At the bottom, there is a microphone. At the top, is a 3.5 mm audio jack and a microUSB port. On the right side, there are volume control buttons and a power button to lock the smartphone. The speaker and a second microphone are located on the back panel, which can be removed. Slots for 1 or 2 SIM cards and a microSD memory card up to 32 GB are located under the case.

The Huawei Y5 has 4 color options: Black, White, Pink, and Blue.

== Specifications ==
=== Hardware ===
The Huawei Y5 features a 4-core 1.1 GHz Qualcomm Snapdragon 210 SoC with an Adreno 304 GPU. The device comes with 8 GB of internal storage and a 1 GB of RAM.

The smartphone has a 2000 mAh user-replaceable battery.

Huawei Y5 features a 4.5-inch IPS LCD display with a 854 x 480 pixels resolution, a 16:9 aspect ratio and a 218 ppi pixel density.

The smartphone has a 5 MP rear camera with autofocus and the ability to record video at a 720p at 30 fps resolution. The front camera has a resolution of 2 MP.

=== Software ===
The Huawei Y5 runs on EMUI Lite 3.1 based on Android 5.1 Lollipop.
