= Huawei P8 lite =

2015 mid-range smartphone by Huawei

Huawei P8 Lite
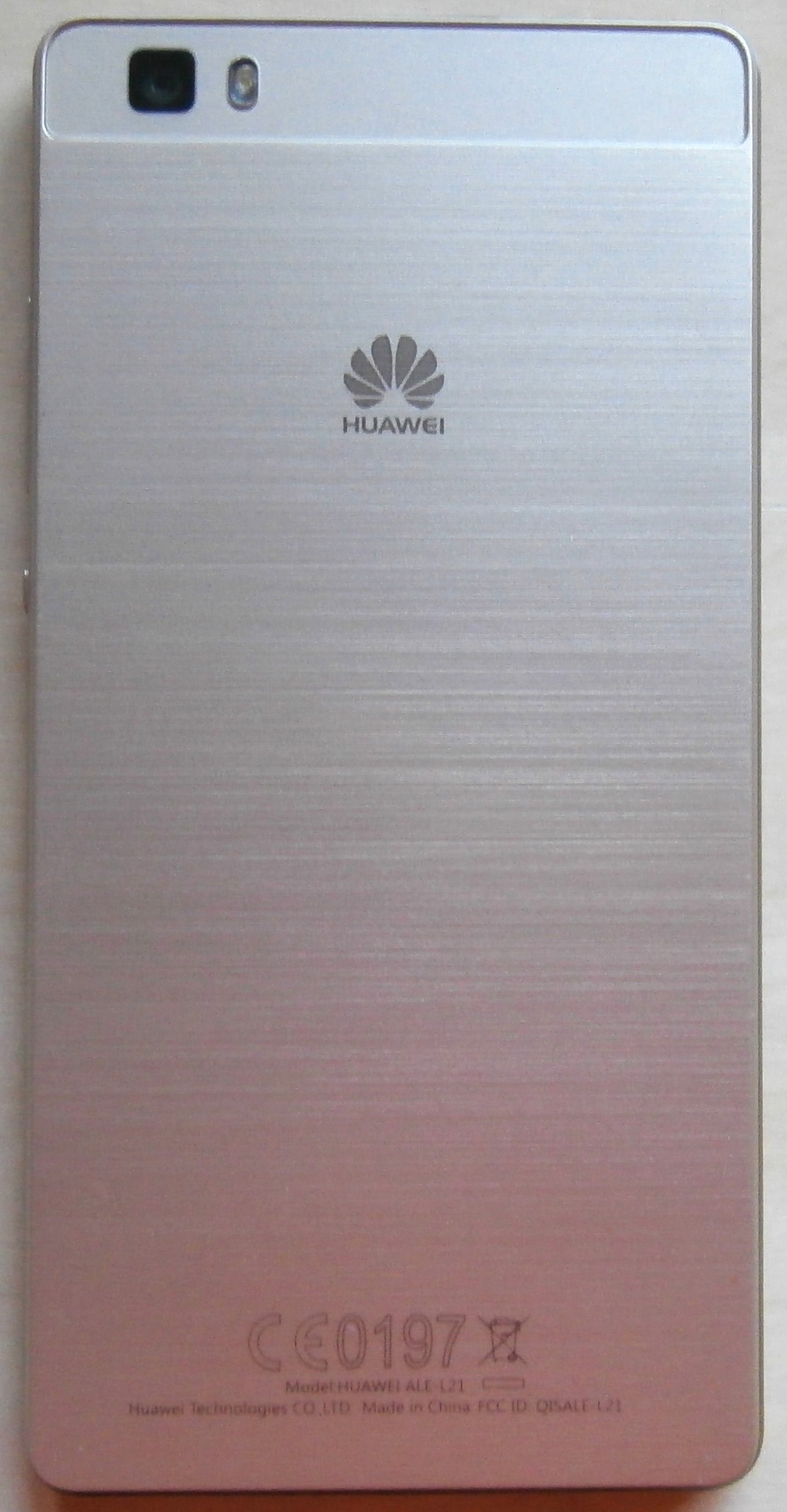
- Huawei P8 Lite (backside)
- Brand: Huawei
- Manufacturer: Huawei
- Type: Smartphone
- Series: P series
- First released: April 2015; 11 years ago
- Successor: Huawei P9 lite
- Related: Huawei P8; Huawei P8 Max
- Compatible networks: 2G, 3G, 4G
- Form factor: Bar
- Colors: Black, White, Gold
- Dimensions: 143×70.6×7.7 mm (5.63×2.78×0.30 in)
- Weight: 131 g (5 oz)
- Operating system: Original: Android 5.0 with EMUI 3.1; Current: Android 6.0 With EMUI 4.0
- CPU: Octa-core 1.2 GHz Cortex-A53 (8 core)
- GPU: Mali-450MP4
- Memory: 2 GB RAM
- Storage: 16 GB
- Removable storage: Up to 32 GB
- SIM: Single and Dual
- Battery: 2200 mAh
- Rear camera: 13 MP
- Front camera: 5 MP
- Display: 5" (1280x720)
- Sound: 1 W
- Connectivity: 802.11 b/g/n, Bluetooth
- SAR: 0.39 W/kg (head), 1.02 W/kg (body)
- Website: Official Website

The Huawei P8 Lite is a mid-range Android-based smartphone manufactured, developed and produced by Huawei, and released in April 2015. The screen is made of Corning Gorilla Glass 3 and the body is made of plastic with a glass insert on top. It is a downscaled version of company's flagship P8. It features a 5 inch HD IPS screen.

Its microSD memory card is expandable up to 128 GB. Under the hood, it utilizes Huawei's own Kirin 620 chipset with 2gb of RAM, but similar to its performance of the MediaTek MT6753 and Qualcomm Snapdragon 615.

The P9 lite received a 13 MP main camera, f/2.0 (wide-angle) with autofocus and the ability to record video in 1080p @30fps. The front camera received a 5 MP resolution with f/2.4 aperture (wide-angle) and the ability to record video in 720p @30fps resolution.

It runs on Android 5.0.2 (Lollipop). However, reviewers report that it runs in an older version, Android 4.4, but it still runs Google's lineup of apps.
