= Acer Liquid Z520 =

Smartphone manufactured by Acer Inc.

- Developer: Acer Inc.
- Type: Smartphone
- Weight: 118 g (4.2 oz)
- Operating system: Android 4.4.2 KitKat
- System-on-chip: Mediatek MT6582M
- CPU: ARM Cortex-A7; 1.3 GHz, 4 cores
- GPU: ARM Mali-400 MP2; 400 MHz, 2 cores
- Memory: 8 GB model: 1 GB (533 MHz); 16 GB model: 2 GB
- Storage: 8 GB, 16 GB
- Removable storage: microSD, microSDHC (dedicated slot)
- SIM: Micro-SIM
- Battery: Li-Polymer 2000 mAh, removable
- Rear camera: 8 MP, AF; LED flash, HDR, panorama 1080p at 30 frame/s, 720p at 60 frame/s
- Front camera: 2 MP
- Display: 480 x 854 pixels, TFT; 5 in, 24-bit color
- Connectivity: Wi-Fi; Bluetooth: 4.1; 2G, 3G, 4G-HSPA+
- Data inputs: Micro USB 2.0

Acer Z520 is a high-end smartphone manufactured by Acer Inc. It is much slimmer than the iPhone 4.
