= Huawei G8 =

Smartphone developed by Huawei

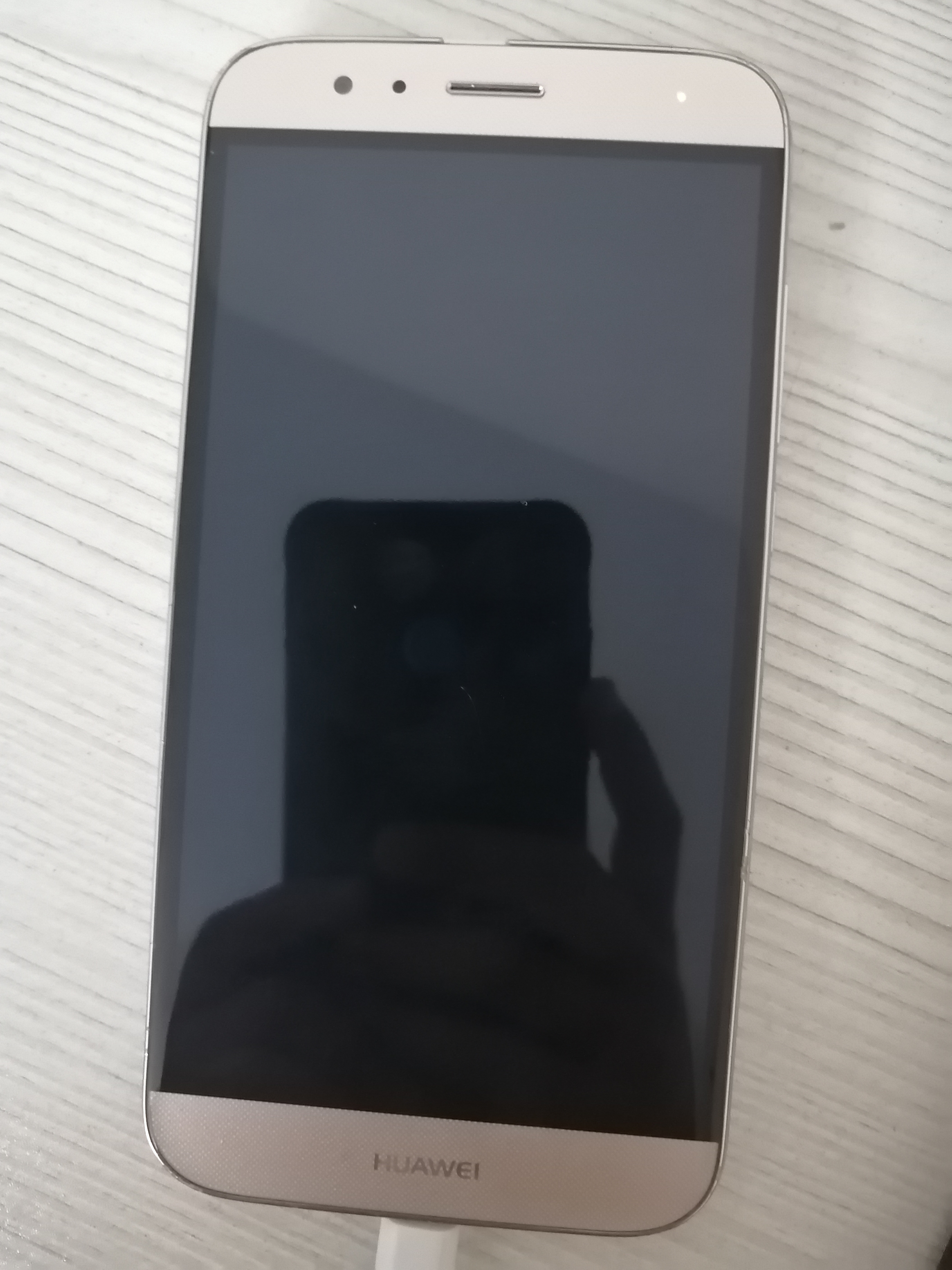
- Manufacturer: Huawei
- Type: Smartphone
- Series: Huawei G
- First released: 2 September 2015; 11 years ago
- Predecessor: Huawei Ascend G7
- Successor: Huawei G9 Plus
- Compatible networks: 2G GSM/GPRS/EDGE 3G TD-SCDMA; 3G UMTS 4G LTE
- Dimensions: 152 mm (6.0 in) H 76.5 mm (3.01 in) W 7.5 mm (0.30 in) D
- Weight: 167 g (5.9 oz)
- Operating system: Android 5.1 "Lollipop" with Emotion UI 3.1
- System-on-chip: Qualcomm Snapdragon 615
- Memory: 3 GB RAM; 2 GB RAM (Chinese Edition)
- Storage: 32 GB; 16 GB (Chinese Edition)
- Removable storage: microSD up to 128 GB
- Battery: 3,000 mAh Li-ion battery
- Rear camera: 13 MP
- Front camera: 5 MP
- Display: 5.5-inch 1080 x 1920 pixels IPS display, 16M colors
- Website: consumer.huawei.com/en/mobile-phones/g8/index.htm

The Huawei G8 (G7 Plus in some markets) is an upper mid-range Android smartphone designed and produced by the company Huawei. It was released on 2 September 2015.

== Specifications ==
=== Hardware ===
The G8 uses an all-metal chassis, a 5.5-inch IPS LCD with Full HD resolution (1920×1080 pixels), and 2.5D curved Gorilla Glass. It also includes a fingerprint sensor on the back of the smartphone, using Huawei's Fingerprint Sense 2.0 technology.

It is equipped with an octa-core Qualcomm Snapdragon 615 processor, which has eight Cortex-A53 cores, four of which are clocked at 1.5 GHz, four at 1.2 GHz. The G8 also integrates the Adreno 405 GPU and has 3 GB of RAM. The G8 includes a 3,000 mAh battery.

It supports GSM, UMTS, LTE-TDD, LTE-FDD networks. For the Chinese edition, it also supports TD-SCDMA network. The G8 supports Wi-Fi, GPS, Bluetooth, NFC and dual-SIMs.

The G8's rear camera has 13 megapixels and a double LED flash. It is also equipped with Sony's IMX278 sensor and features the OIS technology as well as an f/2.0 aperture. The camera also has ISP Foodie mode. The smartphone is equipped with a front camera of 5 megapixels, and also has a makeup mode.

The G8 comes in three colors: Golden, Gray, Silver. It is equipped with 3GB RAM, 32GB ROM, and microSD support up to 128GB. The Chinese edition's RAM and ROM is lower than the global edition, however, with 2GB and 16GB instead.

=== Software ===
The G8 is preloaded with Android 5.1 "Lollipop" and Emotion UI (EMUI) 3.1. The EMUI 3.1's default lock screen features a "sunshine" effect.

== Release ==
The G8 is sold worldwide. The first-wave launch markets were China, Egypt, Germany, Malaysia, Taiwan, Saudi Arabia, and the United Kingdom. The G8 is priced at €399.

== Reception ==
According to GSMArena's review, "the Huawei G8 puts a lot of emphasis on style and definitely excels in this department. It is built to high standards and its stylish exterior and premium feel will get it quite a lot of attention. Well-equipped as well, it is sure to please the majority of Android users, who value quality exterior and rich functionality." Recombu noted that "the Huawei G8 still packs of lot of the same premium features for considerably less money."
