= Huawei Y3 II =

Huawei Y3 II (Honor Bee 2 in India)
- Brand: Huawei, Honor
- Manufacturer: Huawei
- First released: June 2016
- Predecessor: Huawei Y3; Honor Bee
- Successor: Huawei Y3 (2017)
- Compatible networks: 2G/3G
- Colors: Obsidian Black, Arctic White, Sand Gold, Rose Pink, Sky Blue
- Dimensions: 134.1×66.7×9.9 mm (5.28×2.63×0.39 in)
- Weight: 150 g (5.3 oz)
- Operating system: Android 5.1 (Lolipop); EMUI 3.1 Lite
- CPU: Quad-core 1.0 GHz Cortex-A53 - 4G model Quad-core 1.3 GHz Cortex-A7 - 3G model
- GPU: Mali-T720MP2 - 4G model Mali-400MP2 - 3G model
- Memory: microSD, up to 32 GB
- Storage: 8GB 1GB RAM
- Rear camera: Single 5 MP, AF with Dual-LED flash Video: 1080p@30fps
- Front camera: Single 2 MP
- Display: Size: 4.5 inches, 55.8 cm² (~62.3% screen-to-body ratio); Resoluion: 480 x 854 pixels, 16:9 ratio (~218 ppi density)

The Huawei Y3 II is an Android-based smartphone developed by Huawei. It was announced in April and released in June 2016.

Also, the smartphone was released in India under the name Honor Bee 2. The smartphone was positioned with a starting price of $77.

== Appearance ==
The body is entirely made of plastic, and the surface of the back cover has a metal-like texture. On the left side of the body, there is a Smart Key button, which can be customized to provide quick access to desired functions with a single or double press.

A unique feature of this phone is Colorful Lights – a ring around the main camera that changes color and can be customized to the user's preferences.

The phone's thickness is 9.9 mm, width is 66.7 mm, height is 134 mm, and weight is 150 grams.

The Huawei Y3 II has 5 color options: Obsidian Black, Arctic White, Sand Gold, Rose Pink, and Sky Blue.
