= Accessory (band) =

German music group

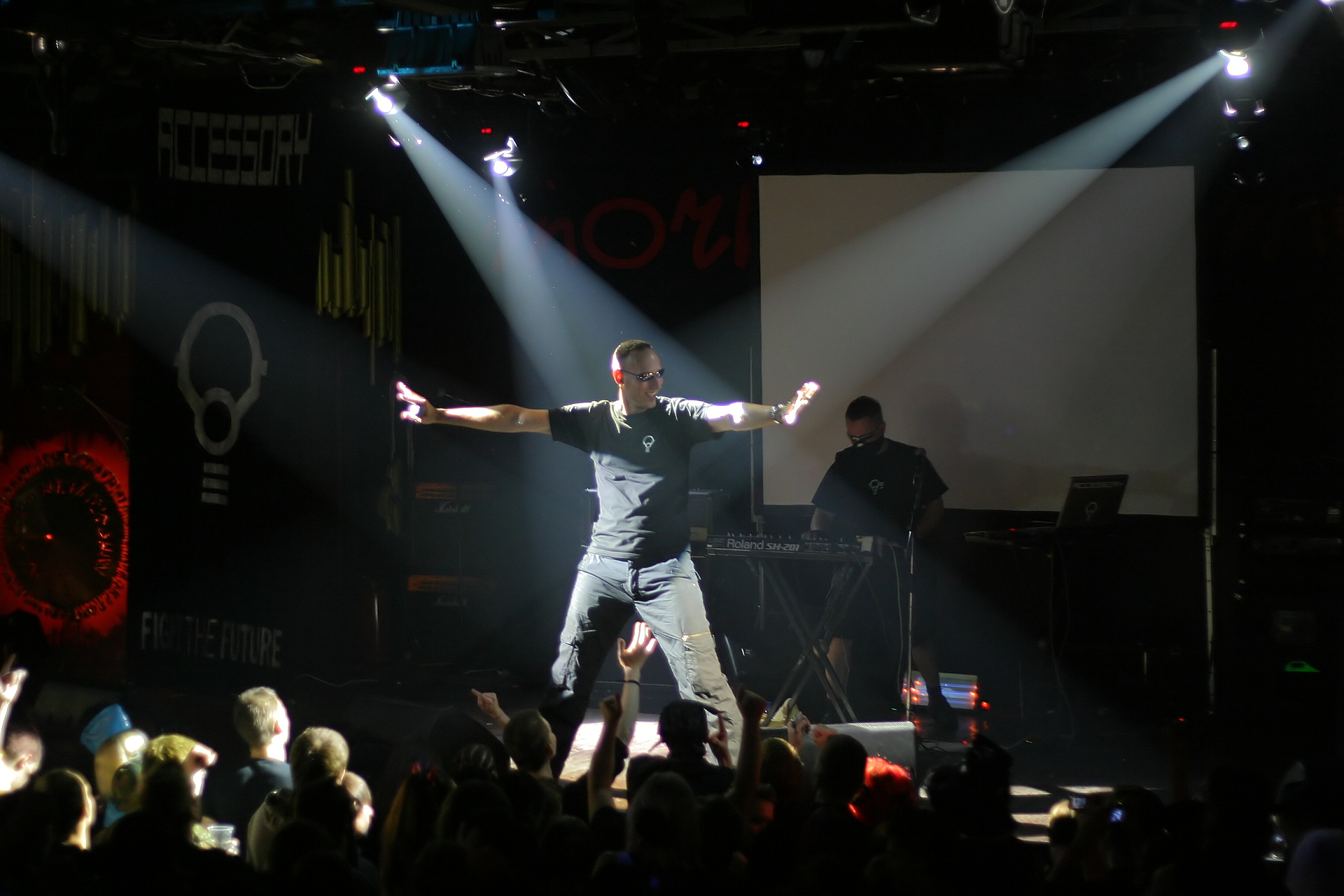

Background information
- Also known as: Voices of Darkness
- Origin: Germany
- Genres: EBM; Synthpop; Futurepop; Electro-Industrial
- Years active: 1994–present
- Labels: Out of Line; Metropolis Records
- Members: Dirk Steyer; Mike Koenigsberger
- Past members: Jukka Sandeck; Kay Resch; Ivo Lottig

Accessory is a German synthpop/electro-industrial group consisting of Dirk Steyer and Ivo Lottig. They have toured with other groups, including Hocico, And One, Terminal Choice.

The group began in 1994 when Dirk Steyer and Kay Resch formed a band under the name "Voices of Darkness", becoming "Accessory" in 1996. In 1997 they released a demo album, Electronic Controlled Mind on a small record label named SD-IMAGE. Ivo joined the group in October 1999 to play on keyboards. Shortly afterwards Kay left the band to pursue his own career, but returned in 2001 to do lighting and technical operations. They released their first official album, Jukka2147.de, in February 2001 after joining the label Out of Line. After the release of their second album, Titan, in 2003, Jukka Sandeck left the band to pursue an individual career.

== Discography ==
=== Albums ===
- 1997: Electronic Controlled Mind
- 2001: Jukka2147.de
- 2002: Live./Hammer
- 2003: Titan
- 2005: Forever & Beyond
- 2008: More Than Machinery
- 2011: Underbeat
- 2013: Resurrection
- 2019: Elektrik

=== EPs and Singles ===
- 2001: Deadline
- 2002: ...And I Say "Go"
- 2002: I Say Go
- 2007: Holy Machine
- 2016: Ship of Fools

=== Compilations ===
- 2005: Awake The Machines Vol. 5 - "Never (short version)"
- 2008: Synthetic Reign Volume One - "Heartattack"
