= Huawei Nova =

Smartphone developed by Huawei

- Manufacturer: Huawei
- Type: Smartphone
- First released: 1 September 2016; 10 years ago
- Successor: Huawei Nova 2
- Compatible networks: 2G GSM/GPRS/EDGE – 850, 900, 1800, 1900 MHz 2G CDMA 1xRTT – 800, 850, 1900 MHz; 3G TD-SCDMA – 1900, 2000 MHz; 3G UMTS – 800, 850, 900, 1700, 1900, 2100 MHz; 3G CDMA2000 1xEV-DO 4G LTE – Bands 1/2/3/4/5/7/8/12/17/18/19/20/28/38/40
- Form factor: Slate
- Dimensions: 141.2 mm (5.56 in) H 69.1 mm (2.72 in) W 7.1 mm (0.28 in) D
- Weight: 146 g (5.1 oz)
- Operating system: Android 6.0 "Marshmallow" with Emotion UI 4.1
- System-on-chip: Qualcomm Snapdragon 625
- Memory: 3 GB LPDDR3 RAM (worldwide); 4 GB LPDDR3 RAM (China)
- Storage: 32 GB (worldwide); 64 GB (China)
- Removable storage: microSD up to 128 GB
- Battery: 4.4 V, 3020 mAh (13.29 Wh) Li-ion battery
- Rear camera: 12 MP, with autofocus
- Front camera: 8 MP, with fixed focus
- Display: 5-inch 1080 x 1920 pixels IPS display, 16M colors
- Website: consumer.huawei.com/en/mobile-phones/nova/index.htm

Huawei Nova Plus (Huawei G9 Plus)
- Manufacturer: Huawei
- Type: Smartphone
- First released: 1 September 2016; 10 years ago
- Predecessor: Huawei G8
- Successor: Huawei Nova 2 Plus
- Related: Huawei G9 lite
- Compatible networks: 2G GSM/GPRS/EDGE – 850, 900, 1800, 1900 MHz 3G UMTS – 800, 850, 900, 1700, 1900, 2100 MHz 4G LTE – Bands 1/2/3/4/5/7/8/12/17/18/19/20/28/38/40
- Form factor: Slate
- Dimensions: 151.8 mm (5.98 in) H 75.7 mm (2.98 in) W 7.3 mm (0.29 in) D
- Weight: 160 g (5.6 oz)
- Operating system: Android 7.0 with Emotion UI 4.1
- System-on-chip: Qualcomm Snapdragon 625
- Memory: 3 GB LPDDR3 RAM
- Storage: 32 GB
- Removable storage: microSD up to 128 GB
- Battery: 4.4 V, 3340 mAh (14.70 Wh) Li-ion battery
- Rear camera: 16 MP, with autofocus
- Front camera: 8 MP, with fixed focus
- Display: 5.5-inch 1080 x 1920 pixels IPS display, 16M colors
- Website: consumer.huawei.com/en/mobile-phones/novaplus/index.htm

The Huawei Nova and Huawei Nova Plus are mid-range smartphones manufactured by Huawei. They were announced and released at the Internationale Funkausstellung Berlin (IFA) on September 1, 2016.

== Specifications ==
=== Hardware ===
The Nova and Nova Plus feature sand-blasted aluminum and slightly rounded backs, allowing them to rest neatly in a user's palm. Both models use "new generation" 2.5D glass and 1080p IPS displays. The Nova features a five-inch display, whereas the Nova Plus display is 5.5 inches. Both phones support a native fingerprint sensor that Huawei lauds as the fastest in the world, requiring only 0.3 seconds to identify a user's fingerprint.

Both models have high-capacity batteries, with final specifications coming to 3,020 mAh for the Nova and 3,340 mAh for the Nova Plus. The Smart Power 4.0 software comes pre-installed on both phones and controls and optimizes battery performance and app power consumption.

Both models are equipped with an octa-core 14 nm Snapdragon 625 processor that computes at speeds of 2 GHz. The chipset specializes in increasing the phone's performance and reducing power consumption.

The Nova and Nova Plus support GSM, UMTS, LTE-TDD and LTE-FDD networks (supported bands vary by models). The Chinese edition of the Nova also supports TD-SCDMA and CDMA2000 1xEV-DO networks. In some countries, a Dual SIM version is available. Both smartphones also support near-field communications (NFC) and Android Pay.

The Nova's rear camera is 12 megapixels with a 1.25 micrometer sensor. It works indoors, showing realistic colors and shadows. The Nova also supports fast autofocus. The rear camera of the Nova Plus is larger, coming in at 16 megapixels. Both phones are equipped with an 8-megapixel front camera and support 4K video recording. They also feature DTS Headphone:X technology.

Both models come in silver, grey, and gold. They are equipped with 3 GB RAM, 32 GB ROM, and microSD support up to 128 GB. In China, the Nova comes in white, black, rose gold, and silver. The hardware configuration is higher than the worldwide version, which is equipped with 4 GB RAM and 64 GB ROM.

=== Software ===
The Nova and the Nova Plus are preloaded with Android 6.0 "Marshmallow" and Huawei's Emotion UI (EMUI) 4.1, but users can also switch to the Google Now Launcher. The phones also include a battery manager, giving users a high level of control over battery-related features. They also offer an ultra power saving mode, which will disable everything except calls and messages and activate a simple, monochromatic interface.

Both phones' cameras offer built-in filters, which include options for car light trails, light graffiti, silky water, and star track. They also offer some modes, including super night mode, slow-motion mode, all-focus mode and a full manual mode (professional mode). The Nova and the Nova Plus also include Beauty Makeup 2.0 and Beautiful Skin 3.0, which apply cosmetic effects and skin smoothing filters to create more flattering images.

== Release ==
The Nova and the Nova Plus went on sale in October 2016 in over 50 countries, with the Nova starting from €399 and the Nova Plus starting from €429.

In China, Zhang Yixing and Guan Xiaotong are spokespersons of Huawei Nova. In time for the production of Huawei's 100 millionth smartphone, Huawei gifted limited edition versions of the Nova to them. The limited edition's back is printed "100000000," "2016年华为手机第1亿部" (Huawei's 100 millionth smartphone in 2016) and "2016.10.14."

== Reception ==
Vlad Savov, writing for The Verge, said that "the Nova is a good-looking device with a build quality that matches or exceeds the best in its targeted price range, which the company describes with the cringe-inducing language of aiming for young 'dynamic aspirers.'"

It concluded that the Nova will be cheap enough for those who cannot afford a flagship device. The website Slashgear also reviewed the device and said, "Huawei, though, didn’t get that memo, and proceeded to aggressively challenge the status quo with several devices that could compete on thinness, metal construction, and design."

The website Recombu said, "...there’s plenty of cool touches to help the Nova stand out in a crowded market."

=== Sales ===
The CEO of Smartphone Division of Huawei Customer BG, He Gang, said the Nova will achieve a sales target of 10 million units.
