= Futian (disambiguation) =

Futian District is part of the city of Shenzhen in Guangdong province, China.

Futian may also refer to:

== China ==
- Futian (富田; Fùtián), a town that used to lend its name to Qingyuan District in Jiangxi province
- Futian, a town in Panzhihua, a prefecture-level city in Sichuan province
- Futian, a town in Shangli County, Jiangxi province
- Futian, a town in Wushan County, Chongqing
- Futian, a town in Boluo County, Guangdong province
- Futian Subdistrict, part of Jianyang District in Sichuan province
- Futian Subdistrict, part of Yiwu, a county-level city in Zhejiang province

== Taiwan ==
- Futian Village in Zhutian, Pingtung County
- Futian (富田; Fùtián) Village in Neipu, Pingtung County
- Futian Village in Tianwei, Changhua County
- Futian Village in Longjing District, Taichung City
