= Huawei GR3 =

Android smartphone developed by Huawei

Huawei GR3 (Huawei Enjoy 5S in China)
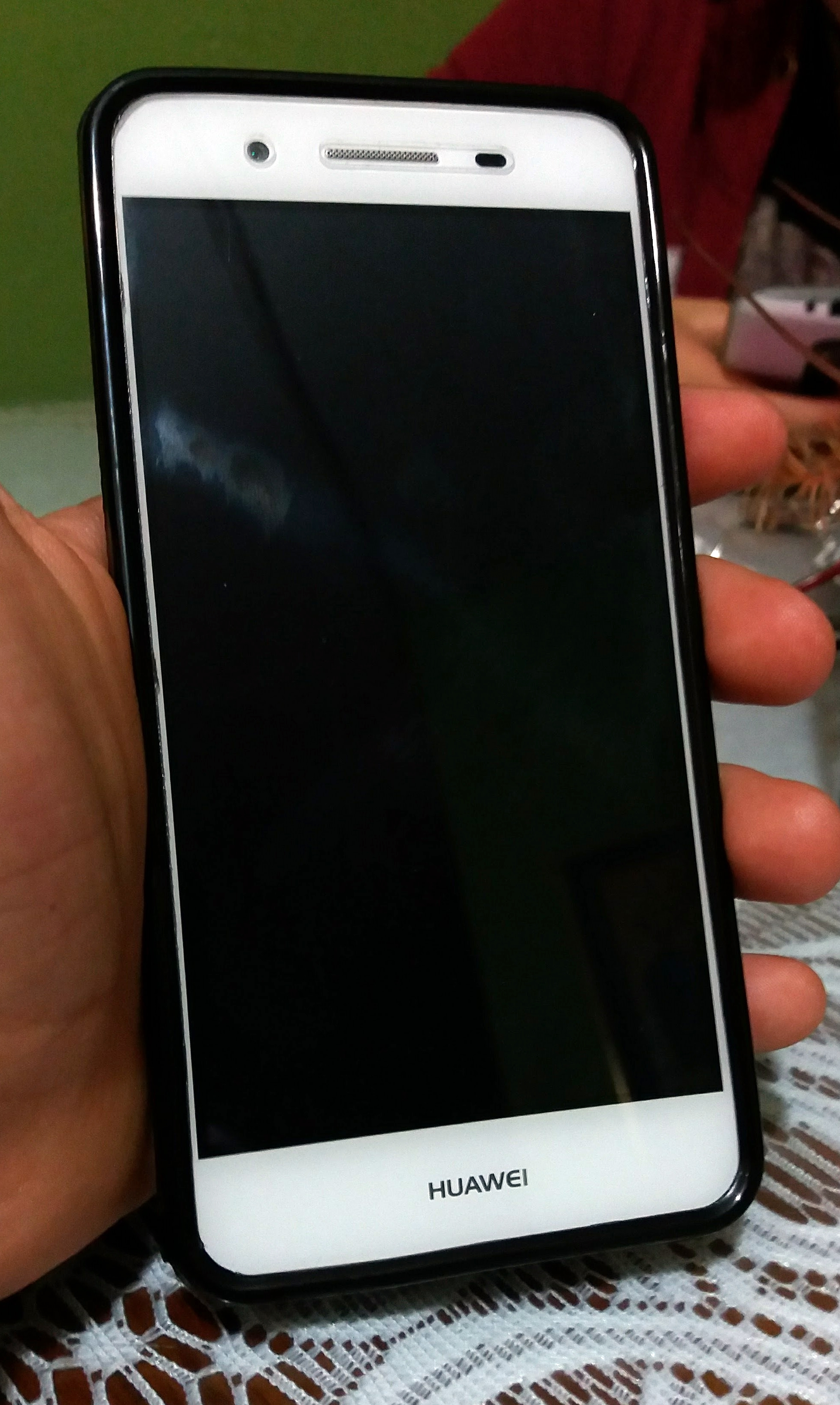
- Huawei GR3
- Brand: Huawei
- Manufacturer: Huawei
- Type: Smartphone
- Series: G/Enjoy
- First released: Enjoy 5s: December 3, 2015; 10 years ago GR3: January 2016; 10 years ago
- Predecessor: Huawei GR3 (2017); Huawei Enjoy 6S
- Related: Huawei GR5; Huawei Enjoy 5
- Compatible networks: GSM, 3G, 4G (LTE)
- Form factor: Monoblock
- Colors: Silver, Gold
- Dimensions: 151.3×76.3×8.2 mm (5.96×3.00×0.32 in)
- Weight: 135 g (5 oz)
- Operating system: Android 5.1.1 Lollipop + EMUI 3.1
- CPU: MediaTek MT6753T, 4x1.5 GHz Cortex-A53
- GPU: Mali-T720MP3
- Memory: 2 GB, LPDDR3
- Storage: 16 GB, eMMC 4.5
- Removable storage: MicroSDXC up to 64 GB
- Battery: Non-removable, Li-Ion 2200 mAh
- Rear camera: 13 MP, f/2.0, AF; LED flash, HDR, panorama Video: 1080p@30fps
- Front camera: 5 MP, 28 mm (wide-angle); Video: 720p@30fps
- Display: IPS LCD, 5.0", 1280 x 720 (HD), 16:9, 294 ppi
- Connectivity: MicroUSB 2.0, 3.5 mm Audio, Bluetooth 4.0 (A2DP), FM radio, Wi-Fi 802.11 b/g/n (Wi-Fi Direct, hotspot), GPS, A-GPS
- Data inputs: Fingerprint scanner (on the back panel) (Enjoy 5S), proximity sensor, accelerometer

The Huawei GR3 is an Android smartphone of the G series by Huawei. It was introduced in January 2016. Also, on December 2, 2015, the Huawei Enjoy 5S was introduced in China, which differs from the GR3 by the presence of a fingerprint scanner.

== Design ==
The screen is made of glass. The body is made of aluminum with plastic inserts at the top and bottom.

At the bottom there is a microUSB connector and a microphone. At the top there is a 3.5 mm audio jack. On the left side there are slots for 2 SIM cards and a microSD memory card up to 64 GB. On the right side there are volume buttons and a smartphone lock button. The speaker, second microphone and fingerprint scanner, which is present only in the Enjoy 5S model, are located on the back panel.

The Huawei GR3 was sold in Silver and Gold colors.

== Specifications ==
=== Platform ===
The smartphone received a MediaTek MT6753T processor and a Mali-T720MP3 graphics processor.

=== Battery ===
The phone's battery has a capacity of 2200 mAh.

=== Cameras ===
The smartphone received a 13 MP main camera, f/2.0 with autofocus and the ability to record video in 1080p@30fps resolution. The front camera received a resolution of 5 MP (wide-angle) and the ability to record video in 720p@30fps resolution.

=== Display ===
IPS LCD screen, 5.0", HD (1280 x 720) with a pixel density of 294 ppi and an aspect ratio of 16:9.

=== Memory ===
The smartphone was sold in a 2/16 GB configuration.

=== Software ===
The smartphone runs on EMUI 3.1 based on Android 5.1.1 Lollipop.
