= Huawei Y6 =

Android smartphone created by Huawei

Huawei Y6 (Honor 4A in China)
- Manufacturers: Huawei, Honor
- Type: Smartphone
- Series: Huawei Y Honor A
- First released: Y6: July 2015; Honor 4A: July 21, 2015
- Successor: Huawei Y6 II; Honor 5A
- Compatible networks: GSM, 3G, 4G (LTE)
- Colors: White, Black, Gold
- Dimensions: 143,5 × 72,1 × 8,5 mm
- Weight: 125 g (4 oz)
- Operating system: Android 5.1 Lollipop + EMUI 3.1
- System-on-chip: Qualcomm MSM8909 Snapdragon 210 (28 nm)
- CPU: 4×1,1 GHz Cortex-A7
- GPU: Adreno 304
- Memory: Y6: 1GB RAM; Honor 4A: 2GB RAM
- Storage: 8GB eMMC 4.5
- Battery: Li-Po 2200 mAh, removable
- Rear camera: 8 MP, f/2.0, AF; LED flash, HDR, panorama Video: 720p@30fps
- Front camera: 2 MP; Video: 720p@30fps
- Display: IPS LCD, 5", 1280 × 720 (HD), 16:9, 294 ppi

The Huawei Y6 is an Android smartphone developed and manufactured by Huawei. In China, the smartphone was introduced as the Honor 4A. Both were announced and released in July 2015.

== Design ==
The front is made of glass, while the frame and back are made of plastic.

The phones have a microUSB port, speaker, and a microphone stylized as a speaker at the bottom, and a 3.5mm audio jack at the top. On the right side, there is a volume rocker and a power button. The rear side houses the camera lens, LED flash, second microphone, and the Huawei logo on the Huawei Y6 or Honor logo on the Honor 4A. The slots for two SIM cards and a microSD card up to 32GB are located under the removable back cover.

The Huawei Y6 has 3 color options: White, Black, and Gold.

== Specifications ==
=== Processor and GPU ===
The Huawei Y6 is powered by a Qualcomm Snapdragon 210 processor and featured an Adreno 304 graphics chip. It came with 1GB of RAM and 8GB of storage. The Honor 4A, a similar model, offered a slightly more powerful configuration with 2GB of RAM and 8GB of storage.

=== Battery ===
The phones' removable battery has a capacity of 2200 mAh.

=== Display ===
The phones feature a 5-inch IPS LCD display with a resolution of 1280 x 720 pixels, a pixel density of 294 ppi, and an aspect ratio of 16:9.

=== Camera ===
The smartphones have an 8MP main camera with an f/2.0 aperture and autofocus, as well as a 2MP front camera. Both cameras can record video in 720p resolution at 30 frames per second.

=== Software ===
The smartphones run on EMUI 3.1 based on Android 5.1 Lollipop.
