= Honor (company) =

Chinese smartphone brand

Honor Device Co., Ltd.
- Logo used since 23 July 2026

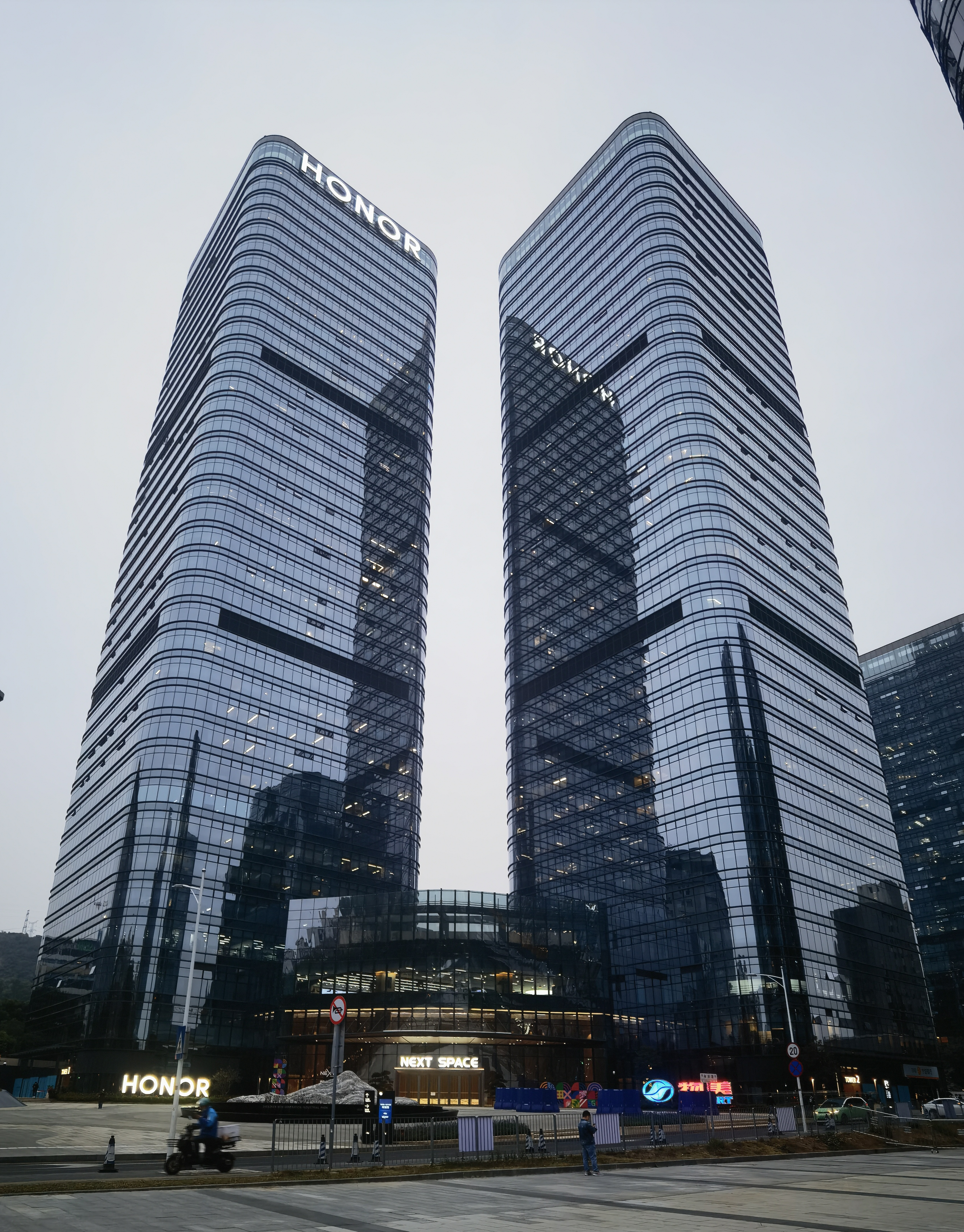
- Headquarters in Shenzhen
- Native name: 荣耀终端股份有限公司
- Type: State-owned enterprise
- Industry: Consumer electronics, mobile internet
- Founded: 2013; 13 years ago
- Headquarters: Futian (disambiguation), Shenzhen, China
- Area served: Worldwide
- Key people: Li Jian
- Products: smartphones, Laptops, wearables, accessories, routers
- Parent: Huawei (2013–2020); Shenzhen Zhixin New Information Technology Co., Ltd. (2020–present)
- Website: honor.com

Honor
- Simplified Chinese: 荣耀
- Traditional Chinese: 榮耀
- Literal meaning: Glory
Transcriptions
Standard Mandarin
- Hanyu Pinyin: Róngyào
Yue: Cantonese
- Jyutping: wing4 jiu6

Honor Device Co., Ltd., commonly known as Honor (Chinese: 荣耀; pinyin: Róngyào), is a Chinese consumer electronics company majority-owned by Shenzhen Zhixin New Information Technology Co. Ltd. It was formerly a subsidiary of Huawei, which sold the brand in November 2020. Honor develops smartphones, tablet computers, wearable devices and mobile device software.

== History ==
Logo from 2013 to 2018

Logo 2018-2026

Classic

Chromatic-colored

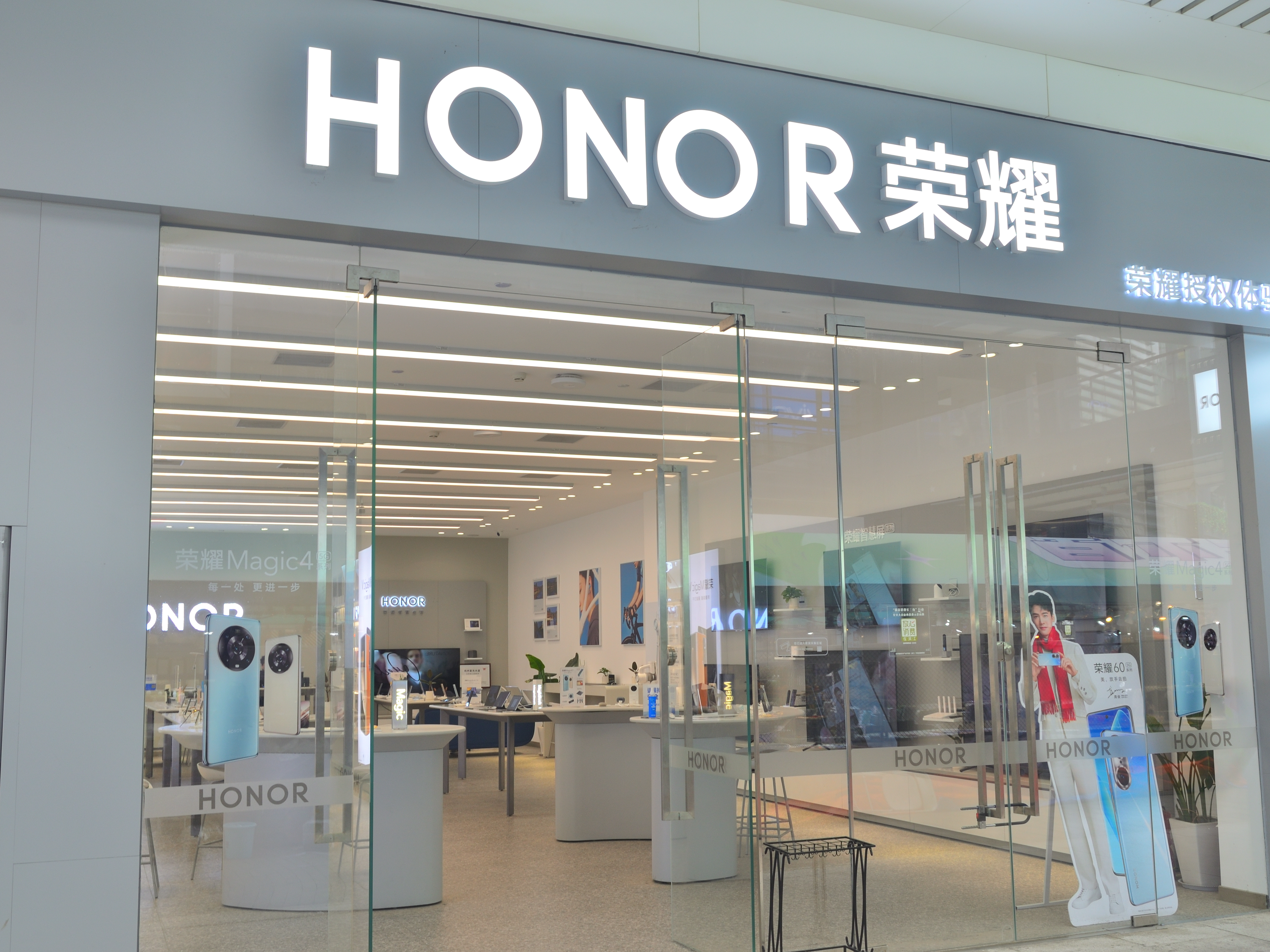
Honor store in Hangzhou

Honor was founded in 2013 as a Huawei sub-brand. Honor's line of smartphones allowed Huawei to compete with mid-range online smartphone brands in China and globally. Honor primarily sells products online, but some Honor products are also available at stores in selected markets.

On 15 May 2019, the US government imposed a ban on Huawei and its subsidiary Honor. This prevented the use of apps such as the Play Store, Google Maps and Gmail on Honor smartphones.

In order to establish independence from Huawei and maintain Honor's operations, the brand and associated business assets were sold to Shenzhen Zhixin New Information Technology Co., Ltd., a newly founded conglomerate of 30 Chinese companies, some of which have close ties to the government. The founder and main shareholder of the conglomerate is Shenzhen Smart City Technology Development Group Co, a state-controlled company owned by the Shenzhen City Government. On 17 November 2020, Huawei announced that it had sold Honor entirely.

=== Timeline of international expansion ===
Honor began to offer its products internationally in 2014, launching the Honor 3C in April in Malaysia, followed by the Honor 6 in Europe in October. By June 2015, the brand was available in 74 countries. In October of that year, Honor announced plans to focus on the Indian market.

In 2015, Honor's Vmall online store, previously available only in China, launched in Europe and the United Kingdom, enabling direct purchases from the manufacturer.

Honor made its debut in the United States with the release of the Huawei Honor 5X at the Consumer Electronics Show (CES) in January 2016. Initially available for online purchase only, the Huawei Honor 5X was later made available at select brick and mortar stores. Also this year Honor started to sell the first fitness-trackers.

In August 2016, Recode reported that Honor had sold over 60 million products, generating over $8.4 billion in revenue.

In January 2017 at CES, Honor announced that the Honor 6X, previously available only in China, would be available in thirteen new markets, including the United States. The phone earned "best of CES 2017" accolades from several technology publications, including Android Authority, Digital Trends, Slash Gear, and Talk Android.

In 2018 Honor started to sell laptops and smartwatches, in 2019 earbuds and TVs.

Since the US sanctions and the brand sale to Shenzhen Zhixin New Information Technology in 2020 Honor has maintained its presence in the Indian market and launched laptops and wearables through e-commerce platforms. The first non-Huawei phone, the V40, was released in January 2021 and the Honor 50 was released in December 2021 as the first to bring back the Google Play Services. In September 2021, it had 15% market share in China. Globally, the company expanded its product line to include foldable smartphones.

== Products ==
The company offers smartphones and tablets with Android and the EMUI and Magic UI user interfaces, Windows, laptops, wearable, earbuds, TVs, and smart home devices.

=== Smartphones ===
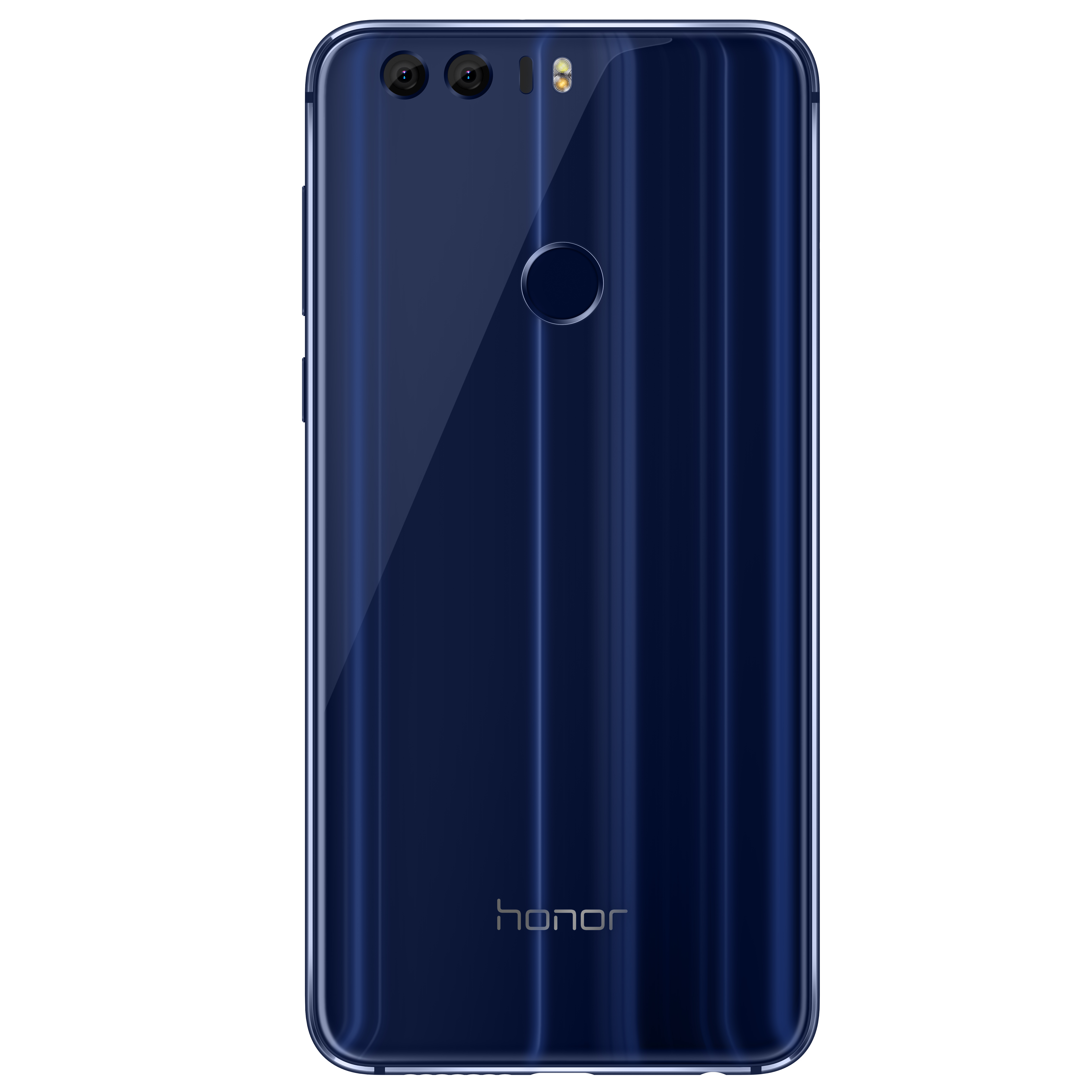
Honor 8 from 2016

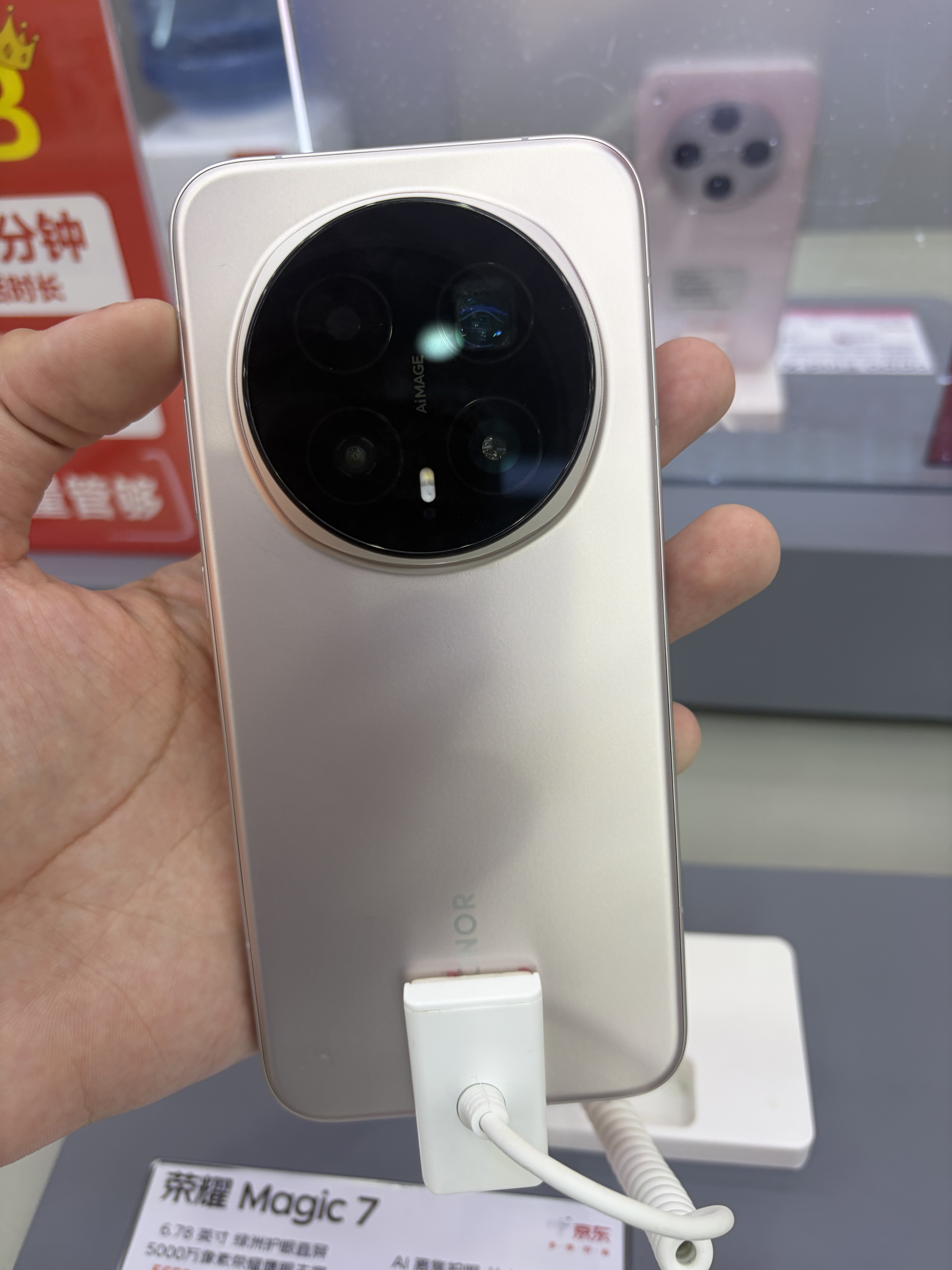
Honor Magic 8 Pro

As of August 2026, the current generation of their N series lineup is the 600 series. Some models are available in "Lite" and "Pro" versions.

The View series (V series in China) is another flagship lineup that was originally introduced in January 2018 as the View 10, while the View 20 was introduced in December 2018 and the View 30 was released in 2020, before they discontinued their lineup with the View 40 in 2021.

The X series is a less expensive lineup with large screens, which originally introduced in 2013 as the 3X.

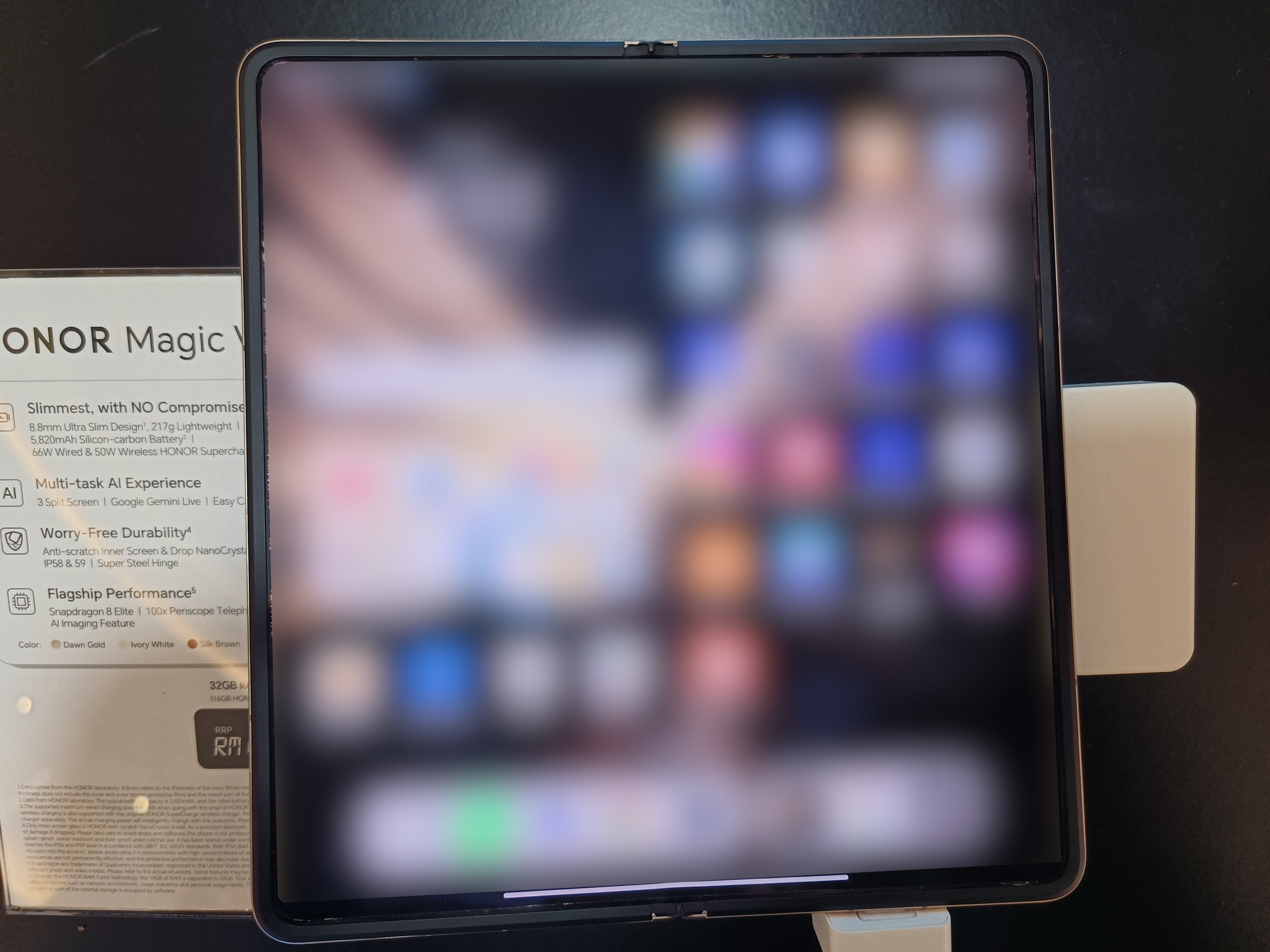
Honor Magic V5 foldable (2025)

The Magic line is yet another flagship lineup that was originally introduced in 2016, while the Magic 2 was introduced in 2018. The Magic 3 was introduced in 2021 under its Zhixin ownership, and the foldable Magic V was introduced in 2022, and the first foldable smartphone in European market, the Honor Magic VS, was introduced in 2023.

The S, A, I, and C series is generally a lesser-known budget lineup, which the A series was introduced in 2014 as the Chinese-exclusive 4A (Huawei Y6), the I series was in 2015 as the 7i, the C series was in 2017 as the 6C (Huawei Enjoy 6S), and the S series was in 2018 as the 7S.

Honor Play 2018, 2022 Honor X40 GT, in 2024 GT split away from X series and became a separate sub-brand, in 2025 GT changed its name into Win. Win Turbo is low end model without built-in fan, Win RT is middle-range model with a single built-in fan, Win is high-end model with two built-in fans. Not to be confused with Number series GT models, such as 2022 Honor 80 GT or 2023 Honor 90 GT.

In August 2026, Honor released the Robot Phone, the first smartphone with a built-in gimbal. At 6 mm in thickness and weighing 2.6 g, it is also the world's most compact gimbal, being 65% smaller than the DJI Osmo.

=== Notebooks ===
In April 2018, the first notebook of the brand, the MagicBook, was released. The series has been continued regularly as Honor's only laptop series.

=== TVs ===
In 2019, Honor launched its first two TVs, the Vision and Vision Pro. So far, no successors have been released.

=== Wearables ===
Since 2016, Honor has been offering fitness trackers and, since 2018, smartwatches. These products are marketed under the names Honor Watch (smartwatches) and Honor Band (fitness trackers).

=== Audio ===
Since 2019, Honor has released wireless earbuds under various model series.
