= Huawei Y5 (2019) =

Android smartphone

Huawei Y5 2019 Honor 8S/8S 2020 (Honor Play 8 in China) Honor Play 3e
- Brand: Huawei/Honor
- Manufacturer: Huawei
- Type: Smartphone
- Series: Huawei Y Honor S/Play
- First released: Y5 2019: April 24, 2019; 7 years ago Honor 8S: April 25, 2019; 7 years ago Honor Play 8: July 9, 2019; 6 years ago Honor Play 3e: May 27, 2020; 6 years ago
- Availability by region: Y5 (2019)/Honor 8S/8S 2020/Honor Play 3e: Worldwide; Honor Play 8: China
- Predecessor: Huawei Y5 (2018); Honor 7S
- Successor: Huawei Y5p; Honor 9S
- Related: Huawei Y6 (2019); Huawei Y7 (2019); Huawei Y9 (2019); Huawei Y Max; Honor 8A; Honor 8C; Honor Play 3
- Compatible networks: GSM, 3G, 4G (LTE)
- Form factor: Monoblock
- Colors: Y5 2019: Midnight Black, Modern Black, Phantom Blue, Amber Brown; Honor 8S: Black, Gold, Blue; Honor 8S 2020: Navy Blue, Midnight Black, Green; Honor Play 3e: Magic Night Black, Aurora Blue, Platinum Gold
- Dimensions: 147,13 × 70,78 × 8,45 mm
- Weight: 146 g (5 oz)
- Operating system: Initial: Y5 2019/Honor 8S/8S 2020/Play 8: Android 9 Pie + EMUI 9.0; Play 3e: Android 9 Pie + EMUI 9.1; Current: Android 9 Pie + EMUI 9.1
- System-on-chip: Y5 2019/Honor 8S/8S 2020/Play 8: MediaTek MT6761 Helio A22 (12 нм); Play 3e: MediaTek MT6762R Helio P22 (12 нм)
- CPU: Y5 2019/Honor 8S/8S 2020/Play 8: 8×2 GHz Cortex-A53; Play 3e: Quad-core (4×2 ГГц Cortex-A53 & 4×1,5 ГГц Cortex-A53)
- GPU: PowerVR GE8320
- Memory: Y5 2019/Honor Play 8: 2GB; Honor 8S/Play 3e: 2/3GB; Honor 8S 2020: 3GB LPDDR4X; Memory card: microSDXC up to 512 GB
- Storage: Y5 2019: 16/32 GB; Honor 8S/Play 3e: 32/64 GB; Play 8: 32 GB; Honor 8S 2020: 64 GB eMMC 5.1
- SIM: Y5 2019: Nano-SIM or Dual SIM (Nano-SIM); Honor 8S/8S 2020: hybrid Dual SIM (Nano-SIM); Honor Play 3e: Dual SIM (Nano-SIM)
- Battery: Li-Ion 3020 mAh, non-removable
- Rear camera: 13 MP, f/1.8, PDAF; LED flash, HDR, panorama Video: 1080p@30fps
- Front camera: 5 MP, f/2.2 Video: 720p@30fps
- Display: IPS LCD, 5,71", 1520 × 720 (HD+), 19:9, 295 ppi
- Connectivity: MicroUSB 2.0, 3.5 мм Аудіо, Bluetooth 5.0 (A2DP, LE), NFC (market/region dependent; Y5 2019 AMN-LX1), FM-radio, Wi-Fi 802.11 b/g/n (Wi-Fi Direct), GPS, A-GPS, GLONASS, BeiDou
- Codename: Y5 2019/Honor 8S/8S 2020/Play 8: Kansas B Honor Play 3e: Kansas A

The Huawei Y5 (2019) (stylized as HUAWEI Y5 2019) is an entry-level Android smartphone developed by Huawei and belongs to the Y series. It was first announced and released on April 24, 2019.

Additionally, on April 25, 2019, the Honor 8S was unveiled, which differs from the Huawei Y5 2019 in terms of its rear panel design. In China, the Honor 8S was introduced on July 9 of the same year under the name Honor Play 8. On May 5, 2020, the Honor 8S 2020 was introduced. This model was only available in a 3GB RAM and 64GB storage configuration. Also, on September 17, 2019, the Honor Play 3e was introduced in China. It's almost identical to the Honor 8S, except for the processor.

In Ukraine, the Huawei Y5 2019 went on sale on May 16, 2019, while the Honor 8S went on sale on May 23, 2019.

== Design ==
The screen is made of glass, while the body is made of plastic. In some color variants of the Huawei Y5 2019, the back panel has a texture similar to leather.

At the bottom, there is a microUSB port, a speaker, and a microphone. At the top, there's a 3.5mm audio jack and a second microphone. On the left side of the Huawei Y5 2019, depending on the model, there's either a slot for 1 SIM card and a memory card, or 2 SIM cards and a memory card. In the Honor Play 3e, there's only a slot for 2 SIM cards and a memory card, while in the Honor 8S/8S 2020, there's a hybrid slot for either 2 SIM cards or 1 SIM card and a memory card. On the right side, the volume rocker and power button are located.

There are several color options, depending on the variant:

- The Huawei Y5 2019 was available in 4 colors: Midnight Black, a leather-textured Modern Black, Phantom Blue, and a leather-textured Amber Brown. In Ukraine, the smartphone was only available in the leather-textured variants.
- The Honor 8S was sold in 3 colors: Black, Blue, and Gold. In Ukraine, the Honor 8S was only sold in black and blue colors.
- The Honor 8S 2020 was available in 3 colors: Navy Blue, Midnight Black, and Green.
- The Honor Play 3e was available in 3 colors: Magic Night Black (black), Aurora Blue (blue), and Platinum Gold (gold).

== Technical specifications ==
=== Processor ===
The Honor Play 3e is equipped with a MediaTek Helio P22 SoC, while all other models feature the Helio A22. Both systems come with a PowerVR GE8320 GPU.

=== Battery ===
The non-removable li-ion battery has a capacity of 3020 mAh.

=== Camera ===
The smartphones feature a 13MP primary camera with an f/1.8 aperture, phase-detection autofocus, and the ability to record video in 1080p resolution at 30 frames per second. Additionally, there's a 5MP front-facing camera with an f/2.2 aperture capable of recording 720p video at 30 frames per second. 720p@30fps.

=== Display ===
All smartphones has an IPS LCD screen, sizing about 5.71 inches, an HD+ (1520 x 720) with a pixel density of 295 ppi, an aspect ratio of 19:9, and a waterdrop notch for the front camera.

=== Storage ===
The Huawei Y5 2019 was sold in 2/16 GB and 2/32 GB configurations. The Honor 8S and Play 3e were available in 2/32 GB and 3/64 GB options, the Honor Play 8 in 2/32 GB, and the Honor 8S 2020 in 3/64 GB. In Ukraine, the Huawei Y5 2019 was only available in the 2/16 GB configuration,

The built-in memory can be expanded with a microSD memory card up to 512 GB.

=== Software ===
The Huawei Y5 2019, Honor 8S/8S 2020, and Honor Play 8 were initially released with EMUI 9.0 and were later updated to EMUI 9.1. The Honor Play 3e, on the other hand, was released directly with EMUI 9.1. Both versions of the interface run on Android 9 Pie.

== Models list ==
Y5 2019: AMN-LX1, AMN-LX2, AMN-LX3, AMN-LX9

Honor 8S: KSA-LX2, KSA-L22, KSA-LX3, KSA-L03, KSA-L23, KSA-LX9, KSA-L09, KSA -L29, KSA-AL10

Honor 8S 2020: KSA-LX9

Honor Play 8: KSA-AL00, KSA-TL00

Honor Play 3e: KSA-AL10
