= Honor X8 5G =

Honor smartphone introduced in 2022

Honor X8 5G Honor Play 30
- Manufacturer: Honor
- Type: Phablet
- Series: X/Play
- First released: Play 30: May 10, 2022; 4 years ago X8 5G: July 23, 2022; 4 years ago
- Availability by region: X8 5G: August 2022; Play 30: China May 27, 2022
- Predecessor: Honor 9C; Honor Play 20
- Successor: Honor Play 40
- Related: Honor X7; Honor X8; Honor X9
- Compatible networks: GSM, 3G, 4G (LTE), 5G
- Form factor: Slate
- Colors: X8 5G: Midnight Black, Ocean Blue; Black, Blue, Gold, Gradient
- Dimensions: 163.66×75.13×8.68 mm (6.443×2.958×0.342 in)
- Weight: 194 g (7 oz)
- Operating system: X8 5G: Android 11, Magic UI 5.0; Play 30: Android 11 without Google Play, Magic UI 5.0
- System-on-chip: Qualcomm SM4350-AC Snapdragon 480+ (8 nm)
- CPU: (2× 2.2 GHz Kryo 460 & 6× 1.9 GHz Kryo 460)
- GPU: Adreno 619
- Memory: X8 5G: 6 GB; Play 30: 4/8 GB; LPDDR4X
- Storage: 128 GB, eMMC 5.1
- Removable storage: MicroSDXC up to 512 GB
- Battery: Non-removable, Li-Po 5000 mAh
- Charging: X8 5G: 22.5 W Play 30: 10 W
- Rear camera: X8 5G: 48 MP, f/1.8 (wide), PDAF + 2 MP, f/2.4 (macro) + 2 MP, f/2.4 (depth); Play 30: 13 MP, f/1.8 (wide), AF; LED flash, HDR, panorama Video: 1080p@30fps
- Front camera: X8 5G: 8 MP, f/2.0 (wide); Play 30: 5 MP, f/2.2 (wide); HDR; Video: 1080p@30fps
- Display: Both models: TFT LCD, 6.5", 1600 × 720 (HD+), 20:9, 270 ppi X8 5G: 60 Hz; Play 30: 90 Hz
- Connectivity: USB-C 2.0, 3.5 mm audio jack, Bluetooth 5.1 (A2DP, LE), FM radio, Wi-Fi 802.11 a/b/g/n/ac (dual-band, Wi-Fi Direct, DLNA, hotspot), NFC, GPS, A-GPS, GLONASS, Galileo, BeiDou
- Data inputs: Proximity sensor, accelerometer, compass
- Website: Official website of Honor X8 5G; Official website of Honor Play 30

The Honor X8 5G is a 5G Android smartphone developed by Honor. It was introduced on July 23, 2022. On May 10, 2022, the Honor Play 30 was introduced in China, featuring a different camera setup, back panel design, and a higher display refresh rate.

== Design ==
The screen is made of aluminosilicate glass. The back panel is made of matte plastic in Black and glossy plastic in all other colors. The edges are made of matte plastic.

The design of the Honor Play 30 resembles the iPhone 13, specifically in its camera block and flat edges. In turn, the Honor X8 5G is similar to the Honor X8.

At the bottom, there is a USB-C port, speaker, microphone, and a 3.5 mm audio jack. A second microphone is located at the top. On the left side, there is a hybrid slot for 2 SIM cards or 1 SIM card and a microSD memory card up to 512 GB. On the right side, there are volume buttons and a power button, which in the Honor X8 5G includes a built-in fingerprint scanner.

With dimensions of 163.66 × 75.13 × 8.68 mm, both smartphones had the 6.5-inch TFT LCD, HD+ (1600 × 720) with a pixel density of 270 ppi, a 20:9 aspect ratio, and a waterdrop notch for the front camera. The Honor Play 30 also supports a refresh rate of up to 90 Hz.

The Honor X8 5G is sold in 2 colors - Midnight Black and Ocean Blue.

In China, the Honor Play 30 is sold in four colors: Black, Blue, Gold, and Gradient.

== Technical specifications ==
=== Hardware ===
Both smartphones are powered by the Qualcomm Snapdragon 480+ SoC with an octa-core CPU (layered with 2x 2.2 GHz Kryo 460 & 6x 1.9 GHz Kryo 460) and Adreno 619 GPU. The battery has a capacity of 5000 mAh. Additionally, the Honor X8 5G supports 22.5 W fast charging, while the Play 30 supports 10 W.

The memory storage configurations differ from the following models:

- The Honor X8 5G is available in a 6/128 GB configuration.
- The Honor Play 30 is available in 4/128 and 8/128 GB configurations.

=== Camera ===
The Honor X8 5G features a triple main camera with a48 MP, f/1.8 (wide) with phase autofocus, a 2 MP f/2.4 (macro) + 2 MP f/2.4 (depth sensor), and an 8 MP, f/2.2 (wide) front camera.

The Honor Play 30 features a 13 MP, f/1.8 (wide) main camera with autofocus and a 5 MP, f/2.2 (wide) front camera.

Both the main and front cameras of both models are capable of recording video at 1080p@30fps.

=== Software ===
The Honor X8 5G runs on Magic UI 4.2, while the Play 30 runs on Magic UI 5.0. Both skins are based on Android 11. The Honor Play 30 does not include Google Play Services as it is sold exclusively in China, using its own app store instead. Google Play is present on the Honor X8 5G.

== Availability ==
In the UK, the X8 5G, along with the Honor 70 and Pad 8, was set to be available in pre-orders on August 26, 2022, and sales began on September 2, 2022.
