= Honor 8C =

LTE smartphone branded by Honor

- Brand: Honor
- Manufacturer: Huawei
- Type: Smartphone
- Series: C series
- First released: October 11, 2018; 7 years ago
- Predecessor: Honor 7C
- Successor: Honor 9C
- Related: Honor 8A, Honor 8S, Honor 8X
- Compatible networks: GSM, 3G, 4G (LTE)
- Form factor: Slate
- Colors: Magic Night Black, Platinum Light Gold, Aurora Blue, Nebula Purple
- Dimensions: 158.7×75.8×8 mm (6.25×2.98×0.31 in)
- Weight: 167.2 g (6 oz)
- Operating system: Android 8.1 Oreo with EMUI 8.2
- CPU: Qualcomm Snapdragon 632 (14 nm), Octa-core (4×1.8 GHz Kryo 250 Gold & 4×1.8 GHz Kryo 250 Silver)
- GPU: Adreno 506
- Memory: 3 or 4 GB LPDDR4
- Storage: 32 or 64 GB eMMC 5.1
- Removable storage: MicroSDXC up to 256 GB
- Battery: Non-removable Li-Po 4000 mAh
- Charging: 10 W
- Rear camera: 13 MP, f/1.8 (wide-angle), PDAF + 2 MP, f/2.4 (depth sensor); LED flash, HDR, panorama Video: 1080p@30fps
- Front camera: 8 MP, f/2.0 (wide-angle); HDR; Video: 1080p@30fps
- Display: IPS LCD, 6.26", 1520 × 720 (HD+), 19:9 ratio, 269 ppi
- Connectivity: Micro-USB 2.0, 3.5 mm audio jack, Bluetooth 4.2 (A2DP, LE), Wi-Fi 802.11 b/g/n (Wi-Fi Direct, hotspot), GPS, A-GPS, GLONASS, BeiDou
- Water resistance: IPX4 (not fully waterproof)
- Other: Fingerprint sensor (rear-mounted), Proximity sensor, accelerometer, compass

The Honor 8C is a smartphone developed by Huawei's sub-brand Honor. It was introduced on October 11, 2018, with pre-orders from October 11 to 15 in China's e-commerce VMall. Sales start on October 16, 2018.

== Specifications ==
=== Design & Build ===
The screen is made of glass. The body is made of glossy plastic for the Phantom Blue color and matte plastic for all other colors. In terms of design, the smartphone is similar to the Honor 8X.

The Honor 8C was sold in five colors: Magic Night Black, Platinum Light Gold, Aurora Blue, Nebula Purple, and Phantom Blue.

With dimensions of 158.7 × 75.8 × 8 mm, the device is installed with an IPS LCD, 6.26", HD+ (1520 × 720) with a pixel density of 269 ppi, a 19:9 aspect ratio, and a notch for the depth sensor, light sensor, earpiece, and front camera.

=== Hardware ===
The 8C was the first smartphone to utilize the Qualcomm Snapdragon 632 processor with an Adreno 506 GPU. The battery has a capacity of 4000 mAh.

The smartphone features a dual main camera with a 13 MP, f/1.8 (wide-angle) with phase detection autofocus and a 2 MP, f/2.4 (depth sensor). The front camera has a resolution of 8 MP and an aperture of f/2.0 (wide-angle). Both the main and front cameras can record video at 1080p@30fps.

The device was sold in 3/32 GB, 4/32 GB, and 4/64 GB configurations.

=== Software ===
The smartphone runs on EMUI 8.2 based on Android 8.1 Oreo.

== Release & availability by region ==
- October 11, 2018
  - China
- November 29, 2018
  - India
- March 27, 2019
  - Philippines
