= Huawei Y5p =

2020 Android smartphones branded by Huawei & Honor

Huawei Y5p / Honor 9S
- Brand: Huawei / Honor
- Manufacturer: Huawei
- Type: Smartphone
- Series: Huawei Y series Honor S series
- First released: Honor 9S: April 29, 2020; 6 years ago Y5p: May 5, 2020; 6 years ago
- Predecessor: Huawei Y5 2019; Honor 8S
- Successor: Honor X5
- Related: Huawei Y6p; Huawei Y7p; Huawei Y8p; Honor 9C
- Compatible networks: GSM, 3G, 4G (LTE)
- Form factor: Slate
- Colors: Y5p: Midnight Black; Phantom Blue; Mint Green; Honor 9S: Black; Blue; Red
- Dimensions: 146.5×70.9×8.4 mm (5.77×2.79×0.33 in)
- Weight: 144 g (5 oz)
- Operating system: Android 10 without Google Play Services, EMUI 10.1 / Magic UI 3.1
- System-on-chip: MediaTek MT6762R Helio P22 (12 nm)
- CPU: Octa-core (4×2 GHz Cortex-A53 & 4×1.5 GHz Cortex-A53)
- GPU: PowerVR GE8320 (650 MHz)
- Memory: 2 GB LPDDR4X
- Storage: 32 GB eMMC 5.1
- Removable storage: microSDXC up to 512 GB
- SIM: Dual SIM (Nano-SIM)
- Battery: Non-removable, Li-Po 3020 mAh
- Charging: 10 W
- Rear camera: 8 MP, f/2.0 (wide), AF; LED flash, HDR, panorama Video: 1080p@30fps
- Front camera: 5 MP, f/2.2 Video: 1080p@30fps
- Display: IPS LCD, 5.45", 1440 × 720 (HD+), 18:9, 295 ppi
- Sound: Mono sound
- Media: Audio: mp3, mid, awb, mp4, m4a, 3gp, ogg, amr, aac, flac, wav, mkv Video: 3gp, mp4, webm, mkv
- Connectivity: MicroUSB 2.0, 3.5 mm audio jack, Bluetooth 5.0 (A2DP, LE), FM radio, Wi-Fi 802.11 b/g/n (Wi-Fi Direct), GPS, A-GPS, GLONASS, BeiDou
- Data inputs: Touchscreen multitouch, 2 microphones, accelerometer, Proximity sensor
- Codename: Dura 2

The Huawei Y5p is an entry-level Android smartphone developed and manufactured by Huawei. It was announced on May 5, 2020 along with the Huawei Y6p.

The Honor 9S was announced on April 29, 2020 and went availalble on May 4, 2020 in Russia, along with the Honor 9C.

== Availability ==
The official release of this phone is May 6, 2020. In August 2020, the Y5p was launched in South Africa.

== Specifications ==
=== Hardware, design and display ===
Both smarphones were powered by the Mediatek MT6762R Helio P22 chipset and an octa-core layered with 8 Cortex-A53s clocking respectively at 1.5 and 2.0 GHz for 4 per processor and the PowerVR GE8320 graphics processor. It comes with a 3020 mAh battery. Both smartphones have a 32GB of internal memory and 2GB of RAM memory. It also comes with a microSD, which is expandable up to 512 GB.

The main camera only features an 8MP main lens with an aperture of f/2.0 and the front camera features a 5MP lens with an aperture of f/2.2. Both cameras can record up to 1080p at 30 fps.

It was available at 3 color options, but differ from the following models:

Huawei Y5p		Honor 9S	
Color	Name	Color	Name
	Midnight Black		Black
	Phantom Blue		Blue
	Mint Green		Red

The display features a 5.45" IPS LCD with 720 x 1440 resolution (18:9), produsing 16 million colors.

=== Software ===
The Huawei Y5p runs on EMUI 10.1, while the Honor 9S runs on Magic UI 3.1. Both interfaces are based on Android 10 with exception of Google Play Services.
