= Vivo Y50 =

2020 Vivo mid-range smartphone

vivo Y50
- Developer: vivo
- Manufacturer: vivo
- Type: Smartphone
- Series: Vivo Y series
- First released: April 6, 2020; 6 years ago
- Availability by region: April 12, 2020; 6 years ago (Worldwide)
- Predecessor: Vivo Y19 (2019)
- Successor: Vivo Y51
- Related: Vivo Y30
- Colors: Starry Black, Iris Blue, Pearl White
- Dimensions: 162 x 76.5 x 9.1 mm (6.38 x 3.01 x 0.36 in)
- Weight: 6.95 oz (197 g)
- Operating system: Android 10, Funtouch 10.0
- System-on-chip: Qualcomm SM6125 Snapdragon 665 (11 nm)
- CPU: Octa-core (4x2.0 GHz Kryo 260 Gold & 4x1.8 GHz Kryo 260 Silver)
- GPU: Adreno 610
- Memory: 6GB or 8GB RAM
- Storage: 128GB RAM, eMMC 5.1
- SIM: Nano-SIM + Nano-SIM
- Battery: 5000 mAh
- Charging: 15W wired
- Rear camera: Quad camera 13 MP, f/2.2, (wide), PDAF, 8 MP, f/2.2, 13mm (ultrawide), 1/4.0", 1.12μm, 2 MP, f/2.4, (macro) 2 MP, f/2.4, (depth); Features LED flash, HDR, and panorama Video: 1080p@30fps
- Front camera: 16 MP, f/2.0, (wide); Video: 1080p@30fps
- Display: Type: IPS LCD; Size: 6.53 inches, 102.9 cm^{2} (~83.1% screen-to-body ratio); Resolution: 1080 x 2400 pixels, 20:9 ratio (~403 ppi density)
- Connectivity: GSM (2G); 850 / 900 / 1800 / 1900; HSDPA (3G); 850 / 900 / 2100; LTE (4G); 1, 3, 5, 7, 8, 38, 40, 41
- Data inputs: Fingerprint (rear-mounted), accelerometer, proximity, compass
- Website: https://www.vivo.com/en/products/param/y50

The Vivo Y50 (stylized as vivo Y50) is a mid-range Android smartphone developed & manufactured by Vivo, officially announced in April 2020 as part of the Vivo Y series. It was succeeded by the Chinese Vivo Y50 (indirect), which was released in July 2025 with a different camera design.

== Technical specifications ==
=== Display ===
The Vivo Y50 features a 6.53-inch FHD+ "Ultra O Screen" with a punch-hole cutout for the front camera, contributing to a high screen-to-body ratio of approximately 90.77%. The display is an IPS LCD panel with a resolution of 2340 x 1080 pixels (FHD+) and an aspect ratio of 19.5:9, resulting in a pixel density of around 403 ppi.

=== Battery ===
The Vivo Y50 has its 5000 mAh non-removable battery. While the global version generally supports 15W wired charging, some markets may have seen different charging specifications.

== Cameras ==
=== Main Camera ===
The rectangular camera module has a quad camera. The camera setup has a 13 MP, with an f/2.2 aperture and PDAF (Phase Detection Autofocus), the primary sensor, an 8 MP wide-angle lens with an f/2.2 aperture and a 13mm focal length with a 120-degree angle, a macro 2 MP, with an f/2.4 aperture is dedicated to close-up shots, and a depth 2 MP with bokeh effect and an f/2.4 aperture sensor.

=== Rear Camera ===
The Y50 features a 16 MP camera module displayed on the left, with an f/2.0 aperture.

== See also ==
- Vivo V50
- Sony Xperia Z
- Samsung Galaxy A12
