= Huawei Y5 lite =

- Brand: Huawei
- Manufacturer: Huawei
- Type: Smartphone
- Series: Huawei Y series
- First released: January 2, 2019; 7 years ago
- Related: Huawei Y5 (2018)
- Colors: Black, Blue
- Dimensions: 146.5×70.9×8.3 mm (5.77×2.79×0.33 in)
- Weight: 142 g (5 oz)
- Operating system: Android 8.1 Oreo; Android Go
- System-on-chip: MediaTek MT6739 (28 nm)
- CPU: Quad-core 1.5 GHz Cortex-A53
- GPU: PowerVR GE8100
- Memory: 1 GB; Memory card: MicroSDXC up to 256 GB
- Storage: 16 GB, eMMC 5.1
- SIM: Single SIM (Nano-SIM) or Dual SIM (Nano-SIM, dual stand-by)
- Battery: Non-removable, Li-Ion 3020 mAh
- Rear camera: 8 MP, f/2.0, PDAF; LED flash, HDR, panorama Video: 1080p@30fps
- Front camera: 5 MP, f/2.2 Video: 720p@30fps
- Display: TFT LCD, 5.45", 1440 × 720 (HD+), 18:9, 295 ppi
- Media: Audio: mp3, mid, awb, mp4, m4a, 3gp, ogg, amr, aac, flac, wav, mkv Video: 3gp, mp4, webm, mkv
- Connectivity: MicroUSB 2.0, 3.5 mm audio, Bluetooth 4.2 (A2DP, LE), FM-radio, Wi-Fi 802.11 b/g/n (Wi-Fi Direct, hotspot), GPS, A-GPS, ГЛОНАСС

The Huawei Y5 lite (also known as the Huawei Y5 lite 2018) is an entry-level smartphone developed by Huawei and belonging to the Y series. It was first announced in December 2018 and was released on January 2, 2019. The Y5 lite is a simplified version of the Y5 2018, featuring a less advanced main camera, less RAM, and running on Android Go.

== Design ==
The smartphone screen is made of glass. The body is made of matte plastic.

In terms of design, the smartphone is identical to the Y5 2018.

At the bottom, there is a microUSB port and a microphone. At the top, there is a 3.5 mm audio jack. On the left side, there is a slot for 2 SIM cards and a microSD memory card up to 256 GB. On the right side, there are volume control buttons and a power button. The speaker is located at the front of the display and also functions as an earpiece.

The Huawei Y5 lite was only sold at Black and Blue colors.

== Technical specifications ==
=== Processor ===
This smartphone is powered by a MediaTek MT6739 processor and features a PowerVR GE8100 GPU.

=== Battery ===
The phone's battery has a capacity of 3020 mAh.

=== Camera ===
The smartphone has an 8MP, f/2.0 main camera (wide-angle) with phase-detection autofocus and the ability to record video in 1080p@30fps resolution. The front camera has a 5MP resolution, f/2.2 aperture, and can record video in 720p@30fps resolution.

=== Display ===
The phone's display has a TFT LCD screen, sizing about 5.45 inches, an HD+ resolution (1440 x 720 pixels) with a pixel density of 295 pixels per inch and an aspect ratio of 18:9.

=== Storage ===
The smartphone has a 1/16 GB of internal memory.

=== Software ===
The smartphone was released on a lightweight version of Android called Android Go version 8.1 Oreo. The firmware on the smartphone itself looks like 'pure' Android, except for the home screen.

== See also ==
- Huawei Y5 2018
- Huawei Y3 2018
