= Huawei Y6 (2018) =

Android entry-level smartphone series manufactured by Huawei

Huawei Y6 2018 Huawei Y6 Prime 2018 Huawei Enjoy 8e Honor 7A (Pro) Honor 7C (Honor 7A in India; Honor Play 7A in China)
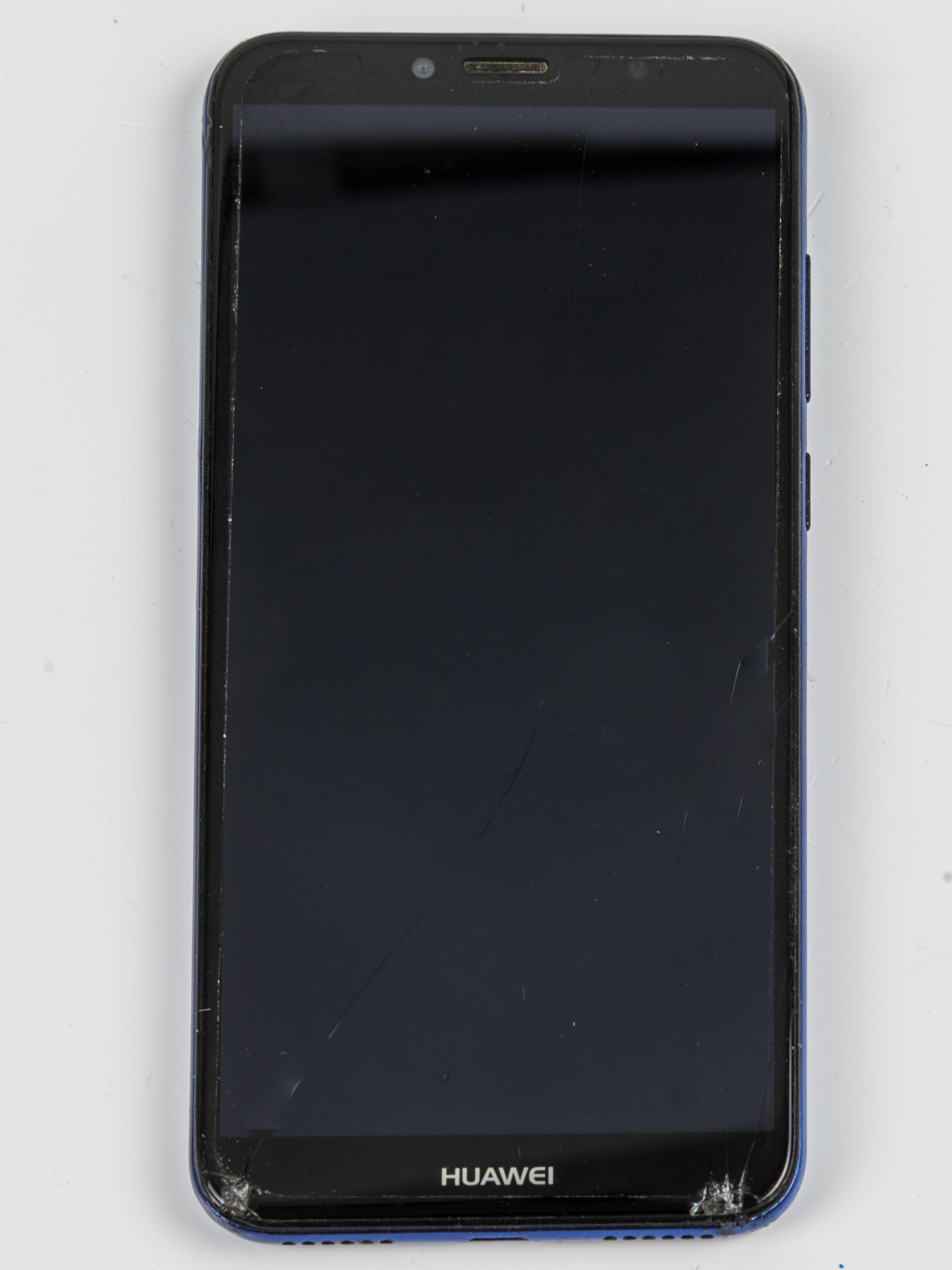
- Huawei Y6 2018
- Manufacturer: Huawei
- Type: Smartphone
- Series: Huawei Y/Enjoy; Honor A/Play
- First released: Enjoy 8e: March 29, 2018; Y6 2018/Honor 7A/Pro: April 2018; Honor Play 7A: April 2, 2018
- Predecessor: Huawei Y6 (2017); Huawei Y6 Pro (2017); Honor 6A; Honor 6C
- Successor: Huawei Y6 (2019); Honor 8A; Honor 8C
- Related: Huawei Y3 (2018); Huawei Y5 (2018); Huawei Y7 (2018); Huawei Y9 (2018); Honor 7X
- Compatible networks: 4G (LTE)/3G/2G
- Form factor: Slate
- Dimensions: 152.4×73×7.8 mm (6.00×2.87×0.31 in)
- Weight: 150 g (5 oz)
- Operating system: Android 8.0 Oreo; EMUI 8.0
- System-on-chip: Y6 2018/Prime 2018: Qualcomm MSM8917 Snapdragon 425 (14 nm); Enjoy 8e/Honor 7A/Pro/Play 7A: Qualcomm MSM8937 Snapdragon 430 (14 nm)
- CPU: Y6 2018/Prime 2018: 4×1.4 GHz Cortex-A53; Enjoy 8e/Honor 7A/Pro/Play 7A: 8 cores (4×1.8 GHz Cortex-A53 + 4×1.1 GHz Cortex-A53)
- GPU: Y6 2018/Prime 2018: Adreno 308; Enjoy 8e/Honor 7A/Pro/Play 7A: Adreno 505
- Memory: Y6 2018/Prime 2018/Honor 7A/Play 7A: 2/3 GB; Enjoy 8e: 3 GB; Honor 7A Pro: 2 GB
- Storage: Y6 2018/Honor 7A Pro: 16 GB; Y6 Prime 2018/Honor 7A: 16/32 GB; Enjoy 8e/Honor Play 7A: 32 GB
- Removable storage: microSD up to 256 GB
- Battery: 3000 mAh
- Rear camera: Y6 2018/Prime 2018/Honor 7A/Pro: 13 MP, f/2.2, PDAF; Enjoy 8e/Honor 7A (India)/Play 7A: 13 MP, f/2.2, PDAF + 2 MP, f/2.4 (depth sensor); LED flash, HDR, panorama Video: 1080p@30fps
- Front camera: Y6 2018: 5 MP; 720p@30fps Y6 Prime 2018/Honor 7A/Pro/Play 7A: 8 MP, f/2.0 1080p@30fps All models: LED flash
- Display: 5.7" (S-IPS), 720 × 1440
- Connectivity: Wi-Fi (802.11 b/g/n), Bluetooth 4.2, FM radio NFC (Honor 7C)
- Made in: China
- Other: Accelerometer, proximity sensor, ambient light sensor, face unlock

The Huawei Y6 2018 and Huawei Y6 Prime 2018 are entry-level Android smartphones from the "Y" series maufactured, designed, and marketed by Huawei, announced in April and June 2018, respectively. The main differences in the Prime model compared to the base version are a higher amount of memory in the maximum configuration and an upgraded front-facing camera.

In spring 2018, the Honor 7A was introduced (not to be confused with the Honor 7S), which differs from the Huawei Y6 Prime 2018 by a redesigned back panel, an improved processor, and a second main camera lens on the Indian variant. The single-lens variant is known as the Honor 7A Pro, while the dual-camera configuration is known as the Honor 7C, which additionally features a NFC chip. In China, the Indian version of the Honor 7A was sold as the Honor Play 7A. Additionally, on March 29, 2018, the Huawei Enjoy 8e was introduced in China (along with the Huawei Enjoy 8 and 8 Plus), sharing specifications with the Honor Play 7A but retaining the exterior design of the Huawei Y6 2018 line.

The Honor 7A was also released in authorized retailers in the Philippines on July 10 in that year following its exclusive release on July 7 for Lazada and Shopee, along with the Honor 9S.

== Design & appearance ==
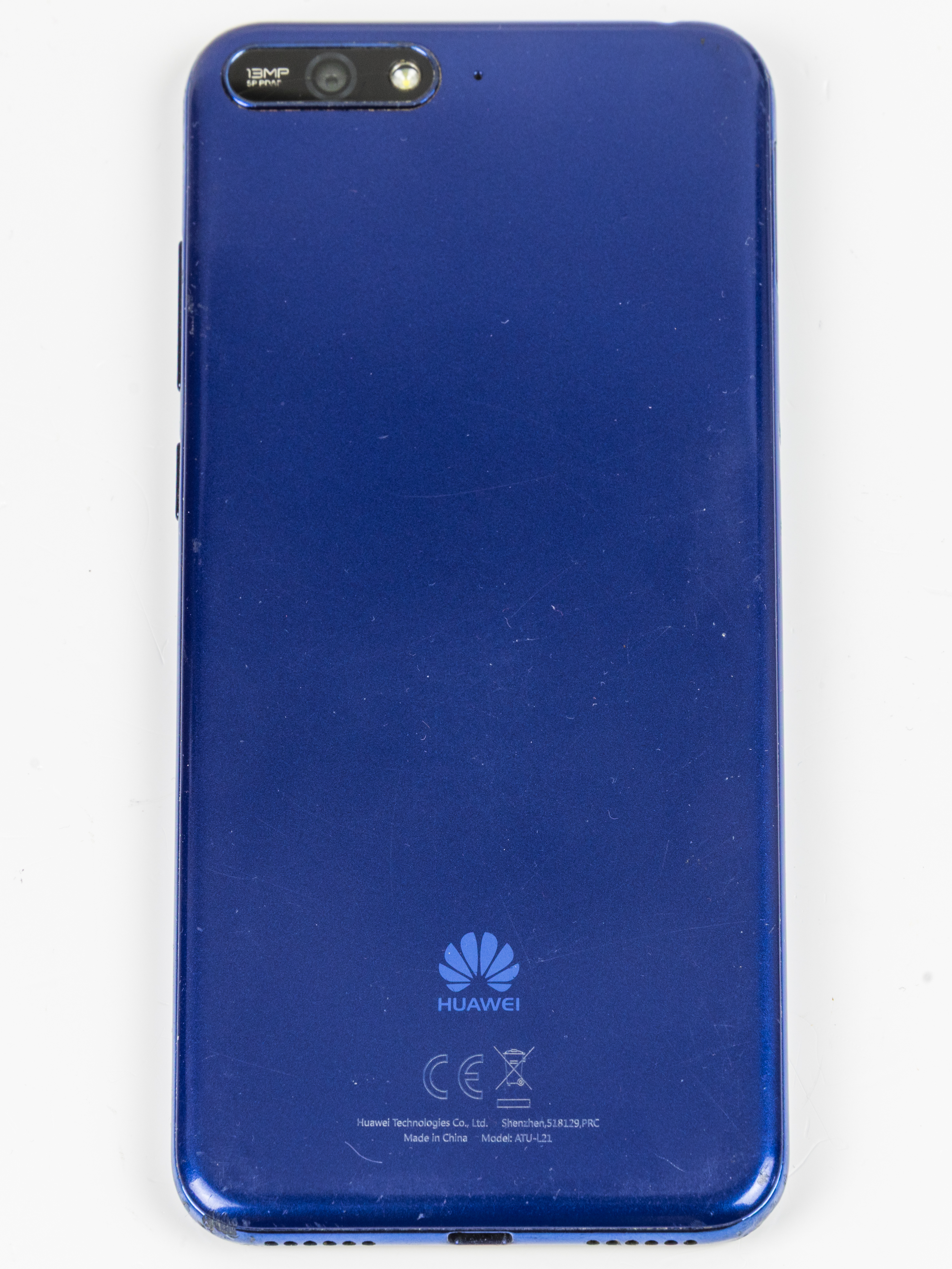
Back panel of the Huawei Y6 2018 in Blue

The front panel is made of glass, and the body and sides were constructed from plastic (with metallic materials with matte and glossy finishes).

The bottom features a micro-USB port alongside the speaker and microphone grilles, while the top houses a 3.5 mm audio jack. The left side contains the tray for 2 SIM cards and a memory card, and the right side holds the volume rocker and lock button. Positioned above the display are the front camera with its flash, the earpiece, and the ambient light/proximity sensor, while the logo sits below the display. On the reverse side, there is a slightly protruding single or dual-camera island with an LED flash, a secondary microphone, and the brand logo.

The Huawei Y6 2018, Y6 Prime 2018, Honor 7A/7A Pro/7C, and Honor Play 7C come in 3 color options: black, blue, and gold, while the Huawei Enjoy 8e also offers a glossy pink option.

== Hardware ==
The Huawei Y6 2018 and Y6 Prime 2018 are powered by the Qualcomm Snapdragon 425 with 4 Cortex-A53 cores clocked at 1.4 GHz and an Adreno 308 GPU, while the Huawei Enjoy 8e and Honor models run on the Snapdragon 430 with 8 Cortex-A53 cores (4 × 1.4 GHz & 4 × 1.1 GHz) and an Adreno 505 GPU. The Huawei Y6 2018 was available in 2/16 GB and 3/16 GB configurations; the Y6 Prime 2018 and Honor 7A in 2/16 GB and 3/32 GB; the Enjoy 8e and Honor 7C in 3/32 GB; the Honor 7A Pro in 2/16 GB; and the Honor Play 7A in 2/32 GB and 3/32 GB. Internal storage can be expanded via a microSD card up to 256 GB.

The smartphones feature a 5.7-inch S-IPS "FullView" display with a resolution of 1440 × 720 pixels and an 18:9 aspect ratio (~282 ppi).

The Huawei Y6 2018, Y6 Prime 2018, and Honor 7A/7A Pro come with a 13 MP main camera with an f/2.2 aperture and phase-detection autofocus (PDAF). The Huawei Enjoy 8e, Indian variant of the Honor 7A, and Honor Play 7A additionally have a 2 MP depth sensor with an f/2.4 aperture. The Y6 2018 carries a 5 MP front camera, whereas all other models feature an 8 MP front shooter with an f/2.0 aperture. Across all models, the front camera handles the Face Unlock feature. The Huawei Y6 2018 can record up to 720p at 30fps.

The non-removable Lithium-Ion battery has a capacity of 3000 mAh.

Supported cellular standards include: 4G/LTE (B1/3/7/8/20); 3G/WCDMA 900/2100 MHz; GSM GPRS/EDGE 900/1800.

Wireless connectivity features include Wi-Fi 802.11 b/g/n and Bluetooth 4.2. The devices support the following navigation systems: GPS, A-GPS, and GLONASS. They include FM radio, a micro-USB interface, and a headphone jack.

== Software ==
The smartphones run on the Android 8.0 (Oreo) operating system with the EMUI 8.0 custom interface.

Supported audio formats are AMR-NB, AAC, AAC+, eAAC+ inside file containers including .mp3, .mp4, .4gp, .ogg, .amr, .aac, .flac, and .wav, while supported video formats include .3gp, .mp4, .wmv, and .asf.

== Reception ==
In terms of the appearance in the front, it was similar to the Huawei Nove 2 Lite. NoypiGeeks reviewer Patty Messias notices that the Y6 2018 was able to take decent photos, stating "the photos Huawei Y6 2018 produces are actually good enough to upload on social media. The color accuracy of the photos made are sometimes off but of course, nothing beats taking photos under good lighting conditions. Low-light shots are typically grainy but it's generally okay for its asking price.

Preceded by Huawei Y6 2017	Huawei Y6 2018; 2018	Succeeded by Huawei Y6 2019
Preceded by Huawei Y6 Pro 2017	Huawei Y6 Prime 2018; 2018	Succeeded by Huawei Y6 Prime 2019
New title	Huawei Enjoy 8e 2018	Succeeded by Huawei Enjoy 9e
Preceded by Honor 6A	Honor 7A/Pro; 2018	Succeeded by Honor 8A
New title	Honor Play 7A; 2018	Succeeded by Honor Play 8A
