= Honor X7 =

Android smartphone by Huawei

Honor X7 Honor Play 30 Plus
- Brand: Honor
- Manufacturer: Honor
- Type: Phablet
- Series: X/Play
- First released: Play 30 Plus: December 16, 2021; 4 years ago X7: March 30, 2022; 4 years ago
- Availability by region: X7: Worldwide; Play 30 Plus: China
- Predecessor: Honor 9C; Honor Play 20 Pro
- Successor: Honor X7a; Honor Play 40 Plus
- Related: Honor X8; Honor X8 5G; Honor X9
- Compatible networks: GSM, 3G, 4G (LTE), 5G (Play 30 Plus)
- Form factor: Slate
- Dimensions: 167.59×77.19×8.62 mm (6.598×3.039×0.339 in)
- Weight: 198 g (7 oz)
- Operating system: Original: X7: Android 11 with Magic UI 4.2; Play 30 Plus: Android 11 with Magic UI 5.0
- CPU: X7: Qualcomm Snapdragon 680 (6 nm), octa-core (4×2.4 GHz Kryo 265 Gold & 4×1.9 GHz Kryo 265 Silver); Play 30 Plus: MediaTek Dimensity 700 (7 nm), octa-core (2×2.2 GHz Cortex-A76 & 6×2.0 GHz Cortex-A55)
- GPU: X7: Adreno 610; Play 30 Plus: Mali-G57 MC2
- Memory: X7: 4 GB; Play 30 Plus: 4/6/8 GB; LPDDR4X
- Storage: 128 GB, UFS 2.1
- Removable storage: MicroSDXC up to 512 GB
- Battery: Non-removable Li-Po 5000 mAh
- Charging: 22.5 W fast charging
- Rear camera: X7: 48 MP, f/1.8, 26 mm (wide), PDAF + 5 MP, f/2.2 (ultrawide) + 2 MP, f/2.4 (macro) + 2 MP, f/2.4 (depth); Play 30 Plus: 13 MP, f/1.8 (wide), PDAF + 2 MP, f/2.4 (depth); LED flash, HDR, panorama Video: 1080p@30fps
- Front camera: X7: 8 MP, f/2.0 (wide); Play 30 Plus: 5 MP, f/2.2 (wide); Video: 1080p@30fps
- Display: 6.74" IPS LCD, 1600 × 720 (HD+), 260 ppi, 90 Hz
- Connectivity: USB-C 2.0, 3.5 mm jack, Bluetooth 5.1 (A2DP, LE), Wi-Fi 802.11 a/b/g/n/ac (dual-band, Wi-Fi Direct, hotspot), NFC (X7), GPS, GLONASS, BDS
- Other: Fingerprint sensor (side-mounted), virtual proximity sensor, accelerometer, gyroscope, compass

The Honor X7 is a budget Android smartphone developed by Honor and was part of Huawei's "X" series. It was announced on March 30, 2022.

On December 16, 2021, alongside the Honor X30 the Honor Play 30 Plus in China was introduced, with different cameras, processor, and a 5G support.

== Specifications ==
=== Design ===
The screen is made of glass and the back panel and sides are made of glossy plastic. The X7's display has a 6.74" 1600 × 720 (20:9) IPS LCD, HD+ with a pixel density of 260 ppi, a display refresh rate of 90 Hz and a teardrop notch for the front camera.

The X7 was sold in 2 color options: Ocean Blue and Titanium Silver.

In China, the Play 30 Plus is sold in 4 colors: Magic Night Black, Charm Sea Blue, Titanium Silver, and Dawn Gold.

=== Hardware ===
The Honor X7 is equipped with a Qualcomm Snapdragon 680 processor and an Adreno 610 GPU. In China, the Honor Play 30 Plus utilizes a MediaTek Dimensity 700 processor and a Mali -G57 MC2 graphics processor.

Both phones are equipped with 5000 mAh battery and supports 22.5-watt fast charging.

The Honor X7 received a main quad camera module. The cameras are wide-angle 48 MP at f/1.8 with phase detection autofocus, an ultra-wide-angle 5 MP at f/2.2, a macro 2 MP at f/2.4, and a depth sensor 2 MP at f/2.4. The front camera utilizes an 8 MP at f/2.0 (wide-angle).

Honor Play 30 Plus received a dual main camera module. The cameras are wide-angle 13 MP, at f/1.8 with phase detection autofocus and a 2 MP, f/2.4 (depth sensor). The front camera received a resolution of 5 MP at an aperture of f/2.2 (wide-angle).

Bouth main and front cameras of all models have the ability to record video in 1080p @ 30fps resolution.

The Honor X7 is only sold in 4/128 GB configuration. Honor Play 30 Plus is sold in multiple configurations: 4/126, 6/128 and 8/128 GB.

The expandable memory and SIM card slot may differ on the variant:

- The X7 has a slot for SIM card and a microSD memory expandable up to 512 GB or a hybrid (2 SIM/1 SIM + microSD) slot.
- The Play 30 Plus only has a hybrid slot.

=== Software ===
The Honor X7 was released with Magic UI 4.2, and the Play 30 Plus with Magic UI 5.0. Both are based on Android 11.

The Honor Play 30 Plus is designed exclusively for the Chinese market, so it lacks Google Play services, while the X7 does have them.
