= Huawei Y9 (2018) =

2018 smartphone model

Huawei Y9 (2018) (Huawei Enjoy 8 Plus in China)
- Brand: Huawei
- Manufacturer: Huawei
- Type: Smartphone
- Series: Y/Enjoy
- First released: Y9 2018: March 11, 2018; 8 years ago Enjoy 8 Plus: March 29, 2018; 8 years ago
- Predecessor: Huawei Enjoy 7 Plus
- Successor: Huawei Y9 (2019)
- Related: Huawei Y3 (2018); Huawei Y5 (2018); Huawei Y6 (2018); Huawei Y7 (2018)
- Compatible networks: GSM, 3G, 4G (LTE)
- Form factor: Slate
- Colors: Black, Gold, Blue
- Dimensions: 157.2×75.3×7.9 mm (6.19×2.96×0.31 in)
- Weight: 170 g (6 oz)
- Operating system: Original: Android 8.0 Oreo + EMUI 8 Current: Android 9 Pie + EMUI 9
- CPU: Kirin 659 (16 nm), Octa-core (4x2.36 GHz Cortex-A53 & 4x1.7 GHz Cortex-A53)
- GPU: Mali-T830 MP2
- Memory: 3/4 GB
- Storage: 32/64/128 GB eMMC 5.1
- Removable storage: MicroSDXC up to 256 GB
- Battery: Non-removable, Li-Ion 4000 mAh
- Rear camera: 16 MP, f/2.2, 27 mm (wide-angle), PDAF + 2 MP, f/2.4, (depth sensor); LED flash, HDR, panorama Video: 1080p@30fps
- Front camera: 13 MP, f/2.0, 26 mm (wide-angle) + 2 MP (depth sensor) or 16 MP, f/2.0, 26 mm (wide-angle), 1/3.06", 1.0 μm + 2 MP (depth sensor); HDR; Video: 1080p@30fps
- Display: IPS LCD, 5.93", 2160 x 1080 (FullHD+), 18:9, 407 ppi
- Connectivity: MicroUSB 2.0, 3.5 mm Audio, Bluetooth 4.2 (A2DP, LE, aptX), FM radio, Wi-Fi 802.11 b/g/n (Wi-Fi Direct, hotspot), GPS, A-GPS, GLONASS, BDS
- Data inputs: Fingerprint scanner (rear-mounted), proximity sensor, accelerometer, gyroscope (market dependent), compass

The Huawei Y9 (2018) is an mid-range Android smartphone developed by Huawei, and it's part of the "Y" series. This phone was announced on March 10, 2018. Also on March 29 at the same year, the smartphone was introduced in China under the name Huawei Enjoy 8 Plus.

The back and frame case is made of aluminum. On the left side, there's a slot for 2 SIM cards and a microSD memory card up to 256 GB. The Y9 2018 was available at 3 color options: Black, Gold, and Blue. A fingerprint sensor is mounted at the top and it's used to activate the screen display.

== Specifications ==
=== Platform ===
The Y9 2018 was powered by the Kirin 659 processor and the Mali-T830 MP2 GPU.

=== Battery ===
The Y9 2018 has a non-removable battery with a 4000 mAh capacity.

=== Camera ===
The smartphone features a dual main camera with a 16 MP, f/2.2 (wide-angle) lens and a 2 MP (depth sensor) lens, equipped with phase-detection autofocus and 1080p@30fps video recording capabilities. The smartphone also has a dual front-facing camera with either a 13 MP, f/2.0 (wide-angle) lens or a 16 MP, f/2.0 lens + 2 MP, f/2.4 (depth sensor) lens, both capable of 1080p@30fps video recording.

=== Display ===
The device is equipped with a 5.93-inch IPS LCD Full HD+ (2160 × 1080) screen, boasting a pixel density of 407 ppi and an 18:9 aspect ratio.

=== Storage ===
The smartphone was sold in 3/32, 4/64, and 4/128 GB configurations.

=== Software ===
The smartphone was released with EMUI 8 based on Android 8.0 Oreo. It was updated to EMUI 9 based on Android 9 Pie.

== See also ==
- Huawei Y5 (2018)
- Samsung Galaxy S9
- Vivo V17
