= V19 =

V19 may refer to:

- Brazilian corvette Caboclo (V19)
- LFG Stralsund V 19 Putbus, a German floatplane
- V-19 Torrent starfighter, a fictional vehicle in the Star Wars franchise
- Vivo V19, a smartphone
- V19, a family history of other conditions, in the ICD-9 V codes
