= Huawei Y7 (2019) =

Huawei smartphone

Huawei Y7 2019 Huawei Y7 Prime 2019 Huawei Y7 Pro 2019 Huawei Enjoy 9
- Manufacturer: Huawei
- Type: Smartphone
- Series: Y/Enjoy
- First released: Enjoy 9: December 10, 2018; Y7 Pro 2019: December 31, 2018; Y7 Prime 2019: January 2019; Y7 2019: March 7, 2019
- Availability by region: Y7 Pro 2019: Vietnam: December 31, 2018; Philippines: February 23, 2019; Enjoy 9: China: December 12, 2018
- Predecessor: Huawei Y7 (2018)
- Successor: Huawei Y7p
- Related: Huawei Y5 (2019); Huawei Y6 (2019); Huawei Y9 (2019); Huawei Y9 Prime 2019; Huawei Enjoy 9S; Huawei Enjoy 9e Huawei P Smart 2019
- Compatible networks: GSM, 3G, 4G (LTE)
- Form factor: Slate
- Colors: Y7 2019: Aurora Blue, Midnight Black, Coral Red; Y7 Prime 2019: Aurora Blue, Midnight Black, Coral Red, Faux Leather; Y7 Pro 2019: Aurora Blue, Midnight Black; Enjoy 9: Aurora Blue, Aurora Purple, Midnight Black, Coral Red
- Dimensions: 158.92×76.91×8.1 mm (6.257×3.028×0.319 in)
- Weight: 168 g (6 oz)
- Operating system: Android 8.1 Oreo + EMUI 8.2
- System-on-chip: Qualcomm Snapdragon 450 (14 nm)
- CPU: 8×1.8 GHz Cortex-A53
- GPU: Adreno 506
- Memory: Y7 2019/Pro 2019/Enjoy 9: 3/4 GB; Y7 Prime 2019: 3 GB; LPDDR3
- Storage: Y7 2019/Pro 2019/Prime 2019: 32/64 GB; Enjoy 9: 32/64/128 GB eMMC 5.1
- Removable storage: microSDXC up to 512 GB
- SIM: Dual SIM (Nano-SIM)
- Battery: Non-removable, Li-Ion 4000 mAh
- Charging: 10 W
- Rear camera: 13 MP, f/1.8, PDAF + 2 MP, f/2.4 (depth sensor); LED flash, HDR, panorama Video: 1080p@30fps
- Front camera: Y7 2019/Enjoy 9: 8 MP, f/2.0 Y7 Prime 2019/Pro 2019: 16 MP; Video: 1080p@30fps
- Display: IPS LCD, 6.26", 1520 × 720 (HD+), 19:9, 269 ppi
- Sound: Mono sound
- Connectivity: Micro-USB 2.0, 3.5 mm Audio, Bluetooth 4.2 (A2DP, LE), NFC (Y7 Pro 2019), FM radio, Wi-Fi 802.11 b/g/n (Wi-Fi Direct), A-GPS, GLONASS, BeiDou
- Data inputs: Multi-touch touchscreen, 2 microphones, fingerprint scanner (rear-mounted, Y7 2019/Prime 2019), Proximity sensor, Accelerometer
- Model: Y7 2019: DUB-LX1/DUB-L21, DUB-LX3/DUB-L23; Y7 Prime 2019: DUB-LX3/DUB-L23; Y7 Pro 2019: DUB-LX2/DUB-L22; Enjoy 9: DUB-AL20, DUB-TL00
- Codename: Dubai

The Huawei Y7 2019 is an entry-level Android smartphone developed and marketed by Huawei as part of its "Y" series. Variants include the Huawei Y7 Prime 2019 featuring an upgraded front camera module, and the Huawei Y7 Pro 2019, which shares the front lens configuration of the Y7 Prime 2019 and includes a NFC chip but lacks a fingerprint scanner. In China, the phone was introduced as the Huawei Enjoy 9, which differs from the base Y7 2019 by introducing a purple color option and omitting the fingerprint scanner.

The Huawei Y7 (2019) was released in Europe on March 7, 2019. The Huawei Y7 Pro (2019) was released in Vietnam on December 31, 2018. It was also rolled out to Philippine markets on February 23, 2019, along with the Huawei Y6 Pro 2019. The Enjoy 9 was releleased in China on December 12, 2018.

On March 21, 2019, the Y7 Prime 2019 was released in Nigerian markets. The faux leather version of the Y7 Prime was released in Pakistan on May 10, 2019.

== Design ==
The body of the Huawei Y7 2019 is constructed entirely out of plastic, featuring a glossy back cover and a matte-finish frame along the perimeter. The front-facing camera is housed in a notch at the top of the display.

The smartphone's dimensions are 158.92 mm in length, 76.91 mm in width, and 8.1 mm in thickness, with a total weight of 168 grams. The standard model was available in three colors: Midnight Black, Aurora Blue (featuring a gradient transition from blue to emerald green), and Coral Red.

The Huawei Y7 Pro 2019 lacks the red option, the Huawei Y7 Prime 2019 featured a limited "Faux Leather" edition with a brown leather-textured back, and the Huawei Enjoy 9 included an exclusive Aurora Purple color variant.

== Hardware ==
The device is powered by a Qualcomm Snapdragon 450 processor with 8 Cortex-A53 cores clocked up to 1.8 GHz, paired with an Adreno 506 graphics processor.

It features 3 GB or 4 GB of RAM and options for 32 GB, 64 GB, or 128 GB of internal eMMC 5.1 storage, expandable via a microSD card slot up to 512 GB.

The front features a 6.26-inch display with a teardrop notch design. The display has a resolution of 1520 × 720 pixels (HD+) and a 19:9 aspect ratio. Powering the system is a non-removable 4000 mAh battery.

== Cameras ==
The rear camera unit consists of a 13 MP main lens with an aperture of f/1.8 and phase detection autofocus (PDAF), assisted by a 2 MP depth sensor with an aperture of f/2.4. The Huawei Y7 2019 and Enjoy 9 house an 8 MP front-facing sensor, while the Y7 Prime 2019 and Y7 Pro 2019 carry a 16 MP front camera. Both front and back camera setups support 1080p video recording at 30fps.

== Software ==
The smartphones launch with the Android 8.1 Oreo operating system layered with Huawei's EMUI 8.2 skin. The software configuration supports biometric security via face unlock alongside standard cellular standards such as FDD-LTE, W-CDMA, and GSM.
