= Honor X9b =

Android mid-range smartphones

HONOR X9b HONOR X50
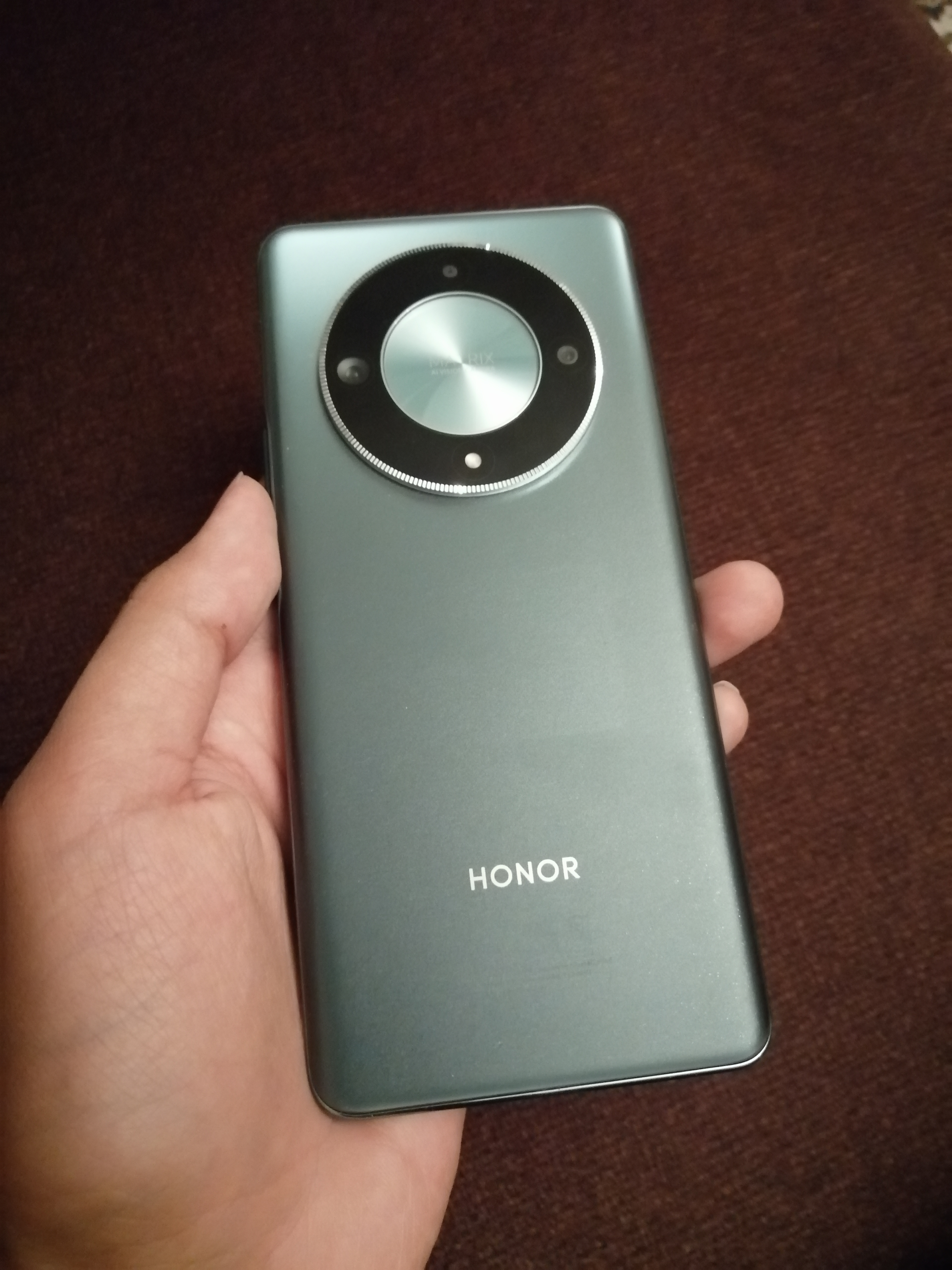
- Honor X9b in Emerald Green
- Brand: HONOR
- Manufacturer: HONOR
- Series: HONOR X Series
- First released: X9b: October 26, 2023; X50: July 5, 2023
- Availability by region: X9b: Worldwide; X50: China
- Predecessor: Honor X9a
- Successor: Honor X9c
- Compatible networks: 5G, 4G LTE, 3G, 2G
- Form factor: Touchscreen slate
- Colors: Sunrise Orange, Midnight Black, Emerald Green
- Dimensions: Thickness: 7.98 mm (0.314 in)
- Weight: 185 g (6.5 oz)
- Operating system: X9b: Android 13 + MagicOS 7.2; X50: Android 13 + MagicOS 7.1
- System-on-chip: Qualcomm Snapdragon 6 Gen 1 (4nm)
- CPU: Octa-core (4x 2.2 GHz Cortex-A78 & 4x 1.8 GHz Cortex-A55)
- GPU: Adreno 710
- Memory: 12 GB RAM (expandable up to 20 GB via HONOR RAM Turbo)
- Storage: 256 GB
- SIM: dual Nano-SIM
- Battery: 5800 mAh (typical), 5700 mAh (rated) Li-Po Lifespam: Video playback: 19 hours; Gaming: 12 hours; Batterly lifespam: 3 years
- Charging: 35W wired + Reverse
- Rear camera: Triple camera system: 108 MP Main Camera (f/1.75 aperture, 1/1.67" sensor size, 3x lossless zoom); 5 MP Ultra Wide Angle Camera; 2 MP Macro Camera; Video: 4K@30fps; 1080p@30fps
- Front camera: 16 MP (f/2.0 or standard portrait layout) Video: 1080p@30fps
- Display: 6.78-inch AMOLED Display; 1.5K Retinal Resolution (2652×1200 pixels); 120 Hz refresh rate, 1200 nits peak brightness, 429 PPI
- Model: ALI-NX1
- Website: https://www.honor.com/ph/phones/honor-x9b/

The Honor X9b (also known as the Honor X50 in Chinese markets) is mid-range Android smartphones manufactured, designed, and marketed by Honor, serving as part of the X series. It was unveiled on October 18, 2023, and was available at selected countries next month. The X9b was released on October 22 in the UAE, then in Saudi Arabia four days later. Later, it was available in Malaysia on November 1 at the same year. It was rolled out to Asian countries, stating with the Philippines on January 12, 2024, followed by India on February 15, 2024. The Honor X50 was only available in China and was released on July 5, 2023.

On November 15, 2024, the smartphone was succeeded by the Honor X9c.

== Durability test ==
Despite that the smartphone is confirmed to be the most durable, the company had to "invite" media to prove if it is false. During independent stress testing, the Honor X9b was subjected to extreme durability trials, which included being struck by a paintball gun, dropped from significant heights, and hit with a small wrecking ball. The device's screen ultimately cracked after extensive testing when the wrecking ball directly impacted the lower right corner.

Manila Bulletin also tested the phone's durability on January 12, 2024, by a Hummer, heavy smashing where the tester have to smash many thick tiles in 30 seconds, aiming at a paintball gun, sparring, archery and a 50-foot drop (including a 100-ft drop).

Vice President of Honor Stephen Cheng says that the X9b was proven to be durable from presice tempering and meticulous inspection.

== Design ==
The Honor X9b features a modern chassis built with modern ergonomics, measuring 163.6 mm × 75.5 mm × 8.0 mm (6.44 in × 2.97 in × 0.31 in) and weighing 185 grams (6.53 oz). The rear panel is highlighted by a distinctive, centered circular camera module housing its triple-lens setup and LED flash.

Depending on the region, the device is available with an official IP53 rating, providing certified protection against dust ingress and light, vertical water splashes. The smartphone is offered in three distinct color variations: Sunrise Orange, Midnight Black, and Emerald Green.

== Specifications ==
=== Hardware ===
The device is powered by the Qualcomm SM6450 Snapdragon 6 Gen 1 chipset, built on a 4-nanometer process node. Its octa-core central processing unit (CPU) configuration consists of four Cortex-A78 cores clocked at 2.2 GHz and four Cortex-A55 cores clocked at 1.8 GHz. Graphics rendering is handled by an integrated Adreno 710 GPU.

The Honor X9b does not include a microSD slot for expandable storage. Instead, it is configured with either 256 GB or 512 GB of internal UFS 3.1 flash storage, paired alongside options of 8 GB or 12 GB of RAM.

Biometric security is managed via an optical under-display fingerprint sensor. Additional built-in hardware sensors include an accelerometer, gyroscope, proximity sensor, and digital compass.

=== Display ===
The phone features a 6.78-inch curved AMOLED display with a 19.5:9 aspect ratio, achieving a ~91.2% screen-to-body ratio. It yields a resolution of 1220 × 2652 pixels, equating to a pixel density of approximately 431 ppi. The screen supports 1 billion colors, a 120 Hz refresh rate, and reaches a peak brightness of 1200 nits.

=== Cameras ===
The rear camera module in the circular camera island positioned in the center consists of three sensors:

- 108 MP primary sensor with an f/1.8 aperture, 1/1.67" sensor size, and Phase Detection Autofocus (PDAF)
- 5 MP ultrawide sensor with an f/2.2 aperture
- 2 MP macro sensor for close-up photography

The rear camera platform is capable of recording video at 4K resolution at 30 frames per second (fps) and 1080p resolution at 30 fps. The front-facing selfie camera relies on a single 16-megapixel wide-angle lens with an f/2.5 aperture, supporting 1080p video recording at 30 fps.

=== Connectivity and audio ===
The Honor X9b supports dual-SIM (Nano-SIM) configurations with compatibility for 5G cellular networks (SA/NSA). Wireless local connectivity includes dual-band Wi-Fi 802.11 a/b/g/n/ac, Wi-Fi Direct, and Bluetooth 5.1 (supporting A2DP and LE). Global positioning is enabled through GPS, GLONASS, GALILEO, and BDS. The device also integrates an infrared port and region-dependent NFC capabilities, though it lacks an FM radio receiver.

For physical interfaces, the handset relies entirely on a USB Type-C 2.0 port with On-The-Go (OTG) capabilities. It features a built-in loudspeaker but lacks a dedicated 3.5mm headphone jack.

=== Battery and charging ===
The smartphone is equipped with a non-removable 5,800 mAh Lithium-Polymer (Li-Po) battery. It supports 35W wired fast charging as well as reverse wired charging capabilities to power auxiliary devices. According to battery testings from 91Mobiles, the X9b claimed 13 hours and 34 minutes of battery life.

=== Software ===
The Honor X9b was launched running on the pre-installed MagicOS 7.2 user interface based on Android 13 operating system.
