= Huawei Y5 (2018) =

2018 Huawei Smartphone

Huawei Y5 (2018) Huawei Y5 Prime (2018)
- Brand: Huawei
- Manufacturer: Huawei
- Type: Smartphone
- Series: Huawei Y
- First released: Y5 Prime 2018: May 2018; 8 years ago Y5 2018: June 2018; 8 years ago
- Predecessor: Huawei Y5 (2017)
- Successor: Huawei Y5 (2019)
- Related: Huawei Y5 lite Huawei Y3 (2018); Huawei Y6 (2018); Huawei Y7 (2018); Huawei Y9 (2018)
- Compatible networks: EDGE, LTE, WCDMA(UMTS)
- Form factor: Monoblock
- Colors: Black, Gold, Blue
- Dimensions: 146.5×71.2×8.3 mm (5.77×2.80×0.33 in)
- Weight: 142 g (5.0 oz)
- Operating system: Android 8.1 Oreo
- System-on-chip: MediaTek MT6739
- CPU: Quad-core 1.5 GHz Cortex-A53
- GPU: PowerVR GE8100
- Memory: 1GB (16GB); 2GB (16 and 32GB); Memory card: microSDXC
- Storage: 16GB, 32GB eMMC 5.1
- Battery: Li-Ion 3020 mAh, non-removable
- Rear camera: Y5 2018: 8 MP (f/2.2); Y5 Prime 2018: 13 MP (f/2.0); Video: 1080p@30fps
- Front camera: 5 MP (f/2.2)
- Display: IPS, 5.45 inches 1440 × 720 pixels, 295 ppi, aspect ratio 18:9
- Connectivity: Bluetooth: v4.2, A2DP, LE; GPS: A-GPS, GLONASS; WLAN: Wi-Fi 802.11 b/g/n, Wi-Fi Direct, hotspot

The Huawei Y5 (2018) is an entry-level Android smartphone developed and manufactured by Huawei, released in June 2018.

In some countries, the Huawei Y5 Prime (2018) model was sold with a different main camera module.

== Design ==
On worldwide, the HUAWEI Y5 (2018) is available in three color options: Black, Blue, and Gold. The Prime model comes in the same colors.

The smartphones have a plastic casing.

These smartphones feature a 5.45-inch screen with an aspect ratio of 18:9 and a resolution of 1440 by 720 pixels.

Above the display, there is a front-facing camera with a flash covered by semi-transparent glass, a conversation/multimedia speaker, and an ambient light/proximity sensor. On the back, there is a slightly protruding camera module and LED flash.

On the left side of the device, there is a triple-slot tray designed to hold two nanoSIM cards and a microSD memory card. The right side houses the power button and volume control keys.

The top edge of the device has a standard 3.5mm audio jack, while the bottom edge features a microphone and a microUSB port.

== Technical specifications ==
=== Processor ===
Smartphones are built on the MediaTek MT6739 processor. This is a 64-bit SoC based on 4 Cortex-A53 cores with a frequency of up to 1.5 GHz. The graphics processor is PowerVR GE8100.

=== Storage ===
The Huawei Y5 2018 has 2GB of RAM and 16GB of internal storage. It also supports microSD cards up to 256GB for additional storage.

=== Camera ===
==== Rear/Main ====
The Y5 2018 is equipped with an 8-megapixel main camera with an f/2.2 aperture, while the Y5 Prime 2018 features a 13-megapixel camera with an f/2.0 aperture, autofocus, and LED flash.

==== Front/Selfie ====
Both models have a 5MP front-facing (selfie) camera with an f/2.2 aperture lens and an LED flash. Video recording is in FHD 1920 x 1080 resolution with stereo sound.

=== Battery ===
The capacity of the non-removable Li-lon battery is 3020 mAh.

== Software ==
The devices operate on Android Oreo 8.1 with the proprietary EMUI 8.1 interface.

There is a support for 2G, 3G, and 4G (LTE) communication standards, with 4G LTE support for both SIM cards. Data transfer standards include EDGE, LTE, and WCDMA(UMTS) 900/2100.

The Y5 (2018) and Y5 Prime (2018) supports the wireless connectivities: Wi-Fi 802.11 b/g/n, and Bluetooth 4.2.

The Y5 (2018) and Y5 Prime (2018) supports the satellite navigation systems: A-GPS, GLONASS, GPS.

The Y5 (2018) and Y5 Prime (2018) was equipped with sensors: light, proximity, and accelerometer.

== See also ==
- Huawei Y5 lite
- Huawei Y5 (2019)
