= Honor X8 =

Android smartphone manufactured by Honor

Honor X8 Honor X30i
- Brand: Honor
- Manufacturer: Honor
- Type: Phablet
- Series: Honor X series
- First released: X30i: October 28, 2021; X8: March 11, 2022
- Availability by region: X8: Worldwide; X30i: China only
- Predecessor: Honor 9C
- Successor: Honor X8a; Honor X40i
- Related: Honor X7; Honor X8 5G; Honor X9; Honor X30 Max
- Compatible networks: GSM, 3G, 4G (LTE), 5G (X30i only)
- Form factor: Slate
- Dimensions: 163.4×74.7×7.45 mm (6.433×2.941×0.293 in)
- Weight: X8: 177 g X30i: 175 g
- Operating system: Initial: X8: Android 11 + Magic UI 4.2; X30i: Android 11 + Magic UI 5.0
- CPU: X8: Qualcomm SDM678 Snapdragon 680 (6 nm), octa-core (4×2.4 GHz Kryo 265 Gold & 4×1.9 GHz Kryo 265 Silver); X30i: MediaTek MT6833P Dimensity 810 (6 nm), octa-core (2×2.4 GHz Cortex-A76 & 6×2.0 GHz Cortex-A55)
- GPU: X8: Adreno 610; X30i: Mali-G57 MC2
- Memory: X8: 4 GB; X30i: 6/8 GB; LPDDR4X
- Storage: X8: 128 GB; X30i: 128/256 GB; UFS 2.1
- Battery: Non-removable, Li-Po 4000 mAh
- Charging: 22.5W fast charging
- Rear camera: X8: 64 MP, f/1.8, 26 mm (wide-angle), PDAF + 5 MP f/2.2 (ultrawide) + 2 MP, f/2.4 (macro) + 2 MP, f/2.4 (depth sensor); X30i: 48 MP, f/1.8 (wide-angle), PDAF + 2 MP, f/2.4 (macro) + 2 MP, f/2.4 (depth sensor); LED flash, HDR, panorama Video: 1080p@30fps
- Front camera: X8: 16 MP, f/2.5 (wide-angle); X30i: 8 MP, f/2.0 (wide-angle); Video: 1080p@30fps
- Display: IPS LCD 6.7", 2388 × 1080 (FullHD+), 391 ppi, 90 Hz
- Connectivity: X8: USB-C 2.0, 3.5 mm audio, Bluetooth 5.0 (A2DP, LE), Wi-Fi 802.11 a/b/g/n/ac (dual-band, Wi-Fi Direct, hotspot), NFC, GPS, A-GPS, GLONASS, Galileo, BDS; X30i: USB-C 2.0, 3.5 mm audio, Bluetooth 5.1 (A2DP, LE), Wi-Fi 802.11 a/b/g/n/ac (dual-band, Wi-Fi Direct, hotspot), GPS, A-GPS, GLONASS, BDS
- Other: X8: Fingerprint scanner (side-mounted), virtual proximity sensor, Accelerometer, Gyroscope, Compass, NFC; X30i: Fingerprint scanner (side-mounted), virtual proximity sensor, Accelerometer, Gyroscope, Compass

The Honor X8 is a mid-range Android smartphone developed by Honor as part of their X series. It was announced on March 11, 2022.

In China, the Honor X30i was announced on October 28, 2021, alongside the Honor X30 Max, and differs from the Honor X8 in cameras, processor, and 5G support.

== Design ==
The screen is made of glass. The back panel is made of glossy plastic in blue color and matte in all other colors. The back panel and side part are made of matte plastic.

By design, the models are almost identical, but when in the X8 the flash is in the middle of the square camera block, then in the X30i — instead of the fourth camera.

At the bottom are located the USB-C connector, speaker, microphone and 3.5 mm audio jack. The second microphone is located on the top. On the left side, depending on the version in the X8, there is a slot for 1 or 2 SIM cards and only for 2 SIM cards in the X30i. On the right side are the volume buttons and the smartphone lock button, which has a built-in fingerprint scanner.

The Honor X8 is sold in 3 colors: Black (Midnight Black), Blue (Ocean Blue) and Silver (Titanium Silver).

In China, the Honor X30i is sold in 4 colors: Black (Magic Night Black), Blue (Charm Sea Blue), Silver (Titanium Silver) and Rose Gold.

== Technical specifications ==
=== Processor ===
The Honor X8 was equipped with the Qualcomm Snapdragon 680 processor and Adreno 610 graphics processor.

The Honor X30i received the MediaTek Dimensity 810 processor and Mali-G57 MC2 graphics processor.

=== Battery ===
The battery received a capacity of 4000 mAh and support for 22.5-watt fast charging.

=== Camera ===
Honor X8 received a main quad camera 64 MP, f/1.8 (wide-angle) with phase autofocus + 5 MP, f/2.2 (ultrawide) + 2 MP, f/2.4 (macro) + 2 MP, f/2.4 (depth sensor). The front camera received a resolution of 16 MP, aperture f/2.5 (wide-angle).

Honor X30i received a main triple camera 48 MP, f/1.8 (wide-angle) with phase autofocus + 2 MP, f/2.4 (macro) + 2 MP, f/2.4 (depth sensor). The front camera received a resolution of 8 MP, aperture f/2.0 (wide-angle).

The main and front camera of all models has the ability to record video in 1080p@30fps resolution.

=== Display ===
The display has an IPS LCD, 6.7", FHD+ (2388 × 1080) with a pixel density of 391 ppi, aspect ratio of 19.9:9, display refresh rate of 90 Hz and a round cutout for the front camera, which is located at the top in the center.

=== Storage ===
The Honor X8 is sold in a 6/128 GB configuration.

The Honor X30i is sold in 6/128, 8/128 and 8/256 GB configurations.

=== Software ===
Honor X8 was released on Magic UI 4.2, and X30i — Magic UI 5.0. Both are based on Android 11. Honor X30i is intended exclusively for the Chinese market, so it does not have Google Play services, and the X8 has them.
