= Vivo Y51 =

2020 Android smartphone

vivo Y51
- Developer: vivo
- Manufacturer: vivo
- Type: Smartphone
- Series: Vivo Y Series
- First released: Announced on December 3, 2020; 5 years ago, released on December 7, 2020; 5 years ago
- Related: Vivo Y51 (September 2020)
- Compatible networks: GSM (2G) 850 / 900 / 1800 / 1900; HSDPA (3G) 850 / 900 / 2100; LTE (4G) 1, 3, 5, 8, 40
- Colors: Titanium Sapphire, Crystal Symphony
- Dimensions: 163.9 x 75.3 x 8.4 mm (6.45 x 2.96 x 0.33 in)
- Weight: 6.63 oz (188 g)
- Operating system: Android 11 with Funtouch 11
- System-on-chip: Qualcomm SDM665 Snapdragon 665 (11 nm)
- CPU: Octa-core (4x2.0 GHz Kryo 260 Gold & 4x1.8 GHz Kryo 260 Silver)
- GPU: Adreno 610
- Memory: 8GB RAM
- Storage: 128GB internal
- Removable storage: microSDXC (dedicated slot)
- SIM: Duo Nano-SIM
- Charging: USB Type-C 2.0, OTG 18W wired, 70% in 67 min
- Rear camera: Triple camera 48 MP, f/1.8, (wide), 1/2.0", 0.8μm, PDAF, 8 MP, f/2.2, 120˚, (ultrawide), 1/4.0", 1.12μm and 2 MP, f/2.4, (macro), with LED flash, HDR, panorama Video: 4K@30fps, 1080p@30fps, gyro-EIS
- Front camera: 16 MP, f/2.0, (wide), 1/3.06" 1.0μm with HDR; Video: 1080p@30fps
- Display: Type: IPS LCD; Size: 6.58 inches, 104.3 cm^{2} (~84.5% screen-to-body ratio); Resulution: 1080 x 2408 pixels, 20:9 ratio (~401 ppi density)
- Connectivity: Bluetooth 5.0, A2DP, LE, Wi-Fi 802.11 a/b/g/n/ac, dual-band, Wi-Fi Direct, GPS, GLONASS, GALILEO, BDS
- Data inputs: Fingerprint (side-mounted), accelerometer, gyro, proximity, compass
- Website: https://www.vivo.com/en/products/param/y51

The Vivo Y51 (2020) is a mid-range Android smartphone manufactured by Vivo, a Chinese technology company. It was officially announced on December 3, 2020, and subsequently released on December 7, 2020, becoming available in various markets, including India, Pakistan, and Indonesia. This iteration of the Y51 differs from an earlier model released in September 2020, primarily in design and some specifications.

The Vivo Y51 (December 2020) was available in two distinct color options: Titanium Sapphire and Crystal Symphony.

The front of the device is dominated by a large 6.58-inch IPS LCD display, offering a resolution of 1080 x 2408 pixels (FHD+) with a 20:9 aspect ratio. This results in a pixel density of approximately 401 ppi, providing sharp images and vibrant colors for media consumption and daily use. The screen-to-body ratio is around 84.5%, contributing to an immersive viewing experience. The display also includes an Eye Protection mode designed to filter out harmful blue light to reduce eye strain.

== Price ==
At its launch in Pakistan in December 2020, the Vivo Y51 was typically priced around PKR 32,999 (Pakistani rupees) for the 4GB RAM/128GB storage variant.

== Processor ==
The Vivo Y51 is powered by the Qualcomm Snapdragon 665 (SDM665) SoC. This particular iteration of the Vivo Y51 was released in December 2020, primarily for markets such as India and Indonesia, and should not be confused with earlier or later models that might share the "Y51" moniker but possess different specifications.

== Camera ==
=== Main/Rear Camera ===
The main sensor has a 48-megapixel module (MP) with an aperture of f/1.8. This wide-angle lens features a sensor size of 1/2.0" and a pixel size of 0.8μm. It also incorporates Phase Detection Autofocus (PDAF) for quicker and more accurate focusing.

The ultra-wide sencor has an 8-MP module with an f/2.2 aperture, offering a 120˚ field of view. The sensor size is 1/4.0" with a pixel size of 1.12μm, designed for capturing broader landscapes and group shots.

The Macro sensor has a 2-MP module with an f/2.4 aperture. This dedicated lens is intended for close-up photography.

=== Selfie/Front Camera ===
The selfie sensor is a 16-MP module with an f/2.0 aperture. This wide-angle lens has a sensor size of 1/3.06" and a pixel size of 1.0μm.
