= Vivo Y30 =

2020 smartphone model

- Brand: Vivo
- Type: Phablet
- Series: Y
- First released: May 5, 2020; 6 years ago
- Successor: Vivo Y31 (2021)
- Related: Vivo Y50
- Compatible networks: GSM, 3G, 4G (LTE)
- Form factor: Slate
- Colors: Dazzle Blue, Moonstone White
- Dimensions: 162.04×76.46×9.11 mm (6.380×3.010×0.359 in)
- Weight: 197 g (7 oz)
- Operating system: Original: Android 10 with Funtouch OS 10; Current: Android 12 with Funtouch OS 12
- System-on-chip: MediaTek MT6765 Helio P35 (12 nm)
- CPU: Octa-core (4×2.35 GHz Cortex-A53 & 4×1.8 GHz Cortex-A53)
- GPU: PowerVR GE8320
- Memory: 4/6/8 GB
- Storage: 64/128 GB eMMC 5.1
- Removable storage: microSDXC up to 256 GB
- SIM: Dual SIM (Nano-SIM)
- Battery: Non-removable Li-Po 5000 mAh
- Charging: 10 W
- Rear camera: 13 MP, f/2.2 (wide), PDAF + 8 MP, f/2.2 (ultrawide), 1/4.0", 1.12 µm + 2 MP, f/2.4 (macro) + 2 MP, f/2.4 (depth); LED flash, HDR, panorama Video: 1080p@30fps
- Front camera: 8 MP, f/2.05 (wide); Video: 1080p@30fps
- Display: 6.47 in IPS LCD, 1560 × 720 (HD+), 19.5:9 ratio, 266 ppi
- Sound: Mono sound
- Connectivity: USB-C 2.0, 3.5 mm jack, Bluetooth 5.0 (A2DP, LE), NFC, Wi-Fi 802.11 b/g/n (Wi-Fi Direct, hotspot), GPS, A-GPS, GLONASS, BeiDou
- Other: Fingerprint sensor (rear-mounted), proximity sensor, accelerometer, compass

The Vivo Y30 is an Android smartphone part of Y series, developed and manufactured by Vivo and it is a low-end version of Vivo Y50. It was first announced on May 7, 2020.

== Specifications ==
=== Display ===
The display is a 6.47" in-plane switching LCD with a resolution at 1560 × 720 (19.5:9) and a pixel density of 266 ppi. The front camera module is a round cutout, located in the upper left corner.

=== Hardware ===
The Y30 is powered with a MediaTek Helio P35 processor and a PowerVR GE8320 GPU. The battery is non-removable with a capacity of 5000 mAh.

The Y30 is available in 64 GB or 128 GB of storage and 4 GB, 6 GB or 8 GB of RAM. Storage can be extended up to 256 GB with the microSD memory card.

The smartphone features a main quad camera, coming with a 13 MP wide-angle camera (f/2.2), an 8 MP ultra-wide camera (f/2.2), and two 2 MP cameras at an aperture at f/2.4. The front camera has a resolution of 8 MP wide-angle camera (f/2.05). Both main and front cameras can record a 1080p video at 30 fps.

=== Software ===
The Y30 was released with FuntouchOS 10 (Android 10) and was updated to FuntouchOS 12 (Android 12).

== See also ==
- Vivo Y50
