= Huawei Y7 (2018) =

Entry-level smartphone manufactured by Huawei

Huawei Y7 2018 Huawei Y7 Prime 2018 (Huawei Nova 2 lite; Huawei Enjoy 8 in China) Huawei Y7 Pro 2018 Honor 7C (Pro) (Honor Play 7C in China)
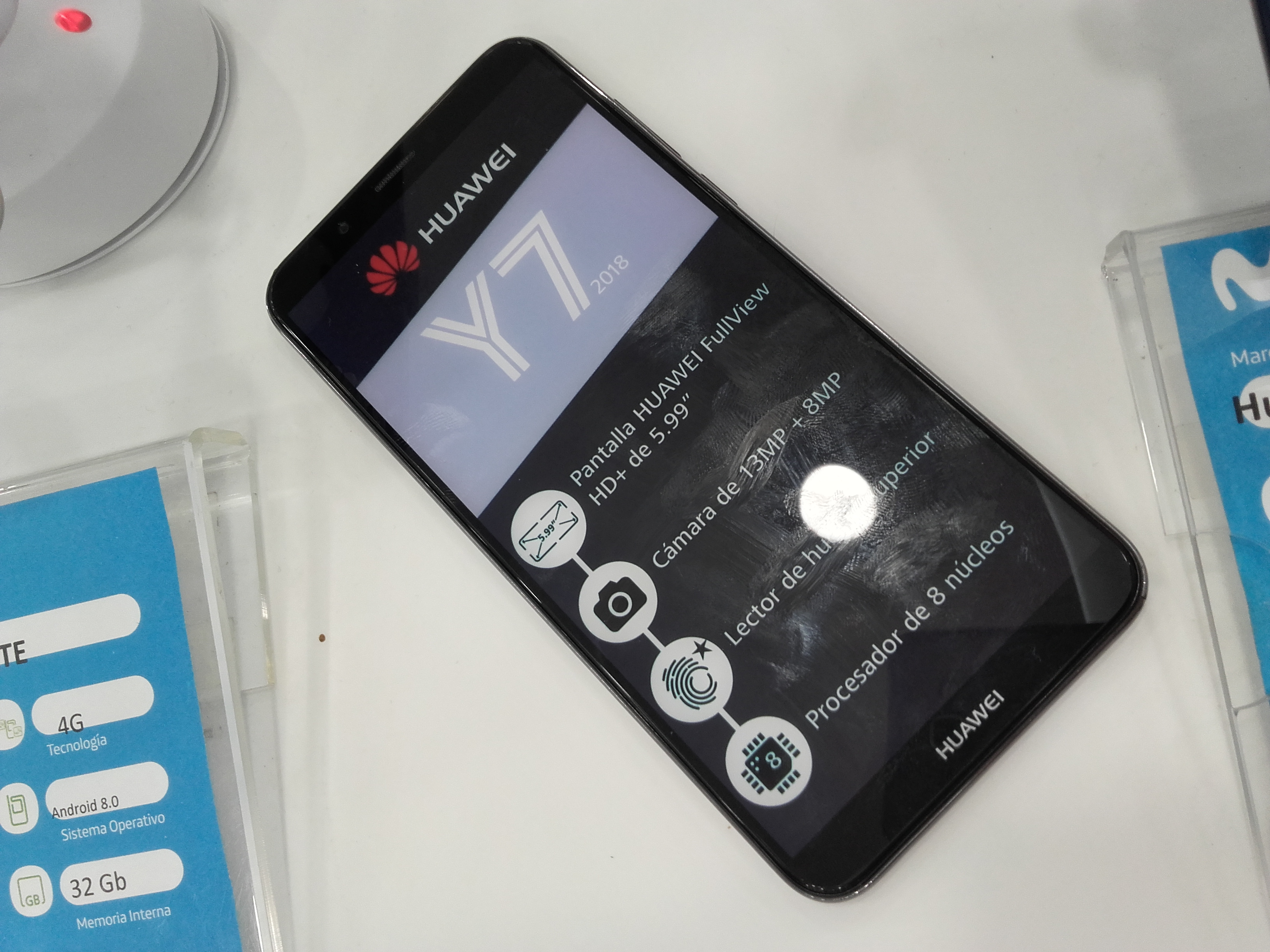
- Huawei Y7 2018 with factory film
- Brand: Huawei, Honor
- Manufacturer: Huawei
- Type: Smartphone
- Series: Huawei Y/Enjoy/Nova; Honor C/Play
- First released: Play 7C: March 12, 2018; 8 years ago Nova 2 lite: March 14, 2018; 8 years ago Y7 Prime 2018: March 27, 2018; 8 years ago Enjoy 8: March 29, 2018; 8 years ago Y7 2018/Pro 2018: March 2018; 8 years ago Honor 7C: May 22, 2018; 8 years ago Honor 7C Pro: June 2018; 8 years ago
- Predecessor: Huawei Y7; Huawei Enjoy 7 Huawei Nova lite Honor 6C; Honor 6C Pro
- Successor: Huawei Y7 (2019); Honor 8C
- Related: Huawei Y3 (2018); Huawei Y5 (2018); Huawei Y6 (2018); Huawei Y9 (2018); Huawei Nova 2 Huawei Nova 2 Plus; Huawei Nova 2i Huawei Nova 2s Honor 7X
- Compatible networks: GSM, 3G, 4G (LTE)
- Form factor: Slate
- Colors: Black, blue, gold
- Dimensions: 158.3×76.7×7.8 mm (6.23×3.02×0.31 in)
- Weight: 155 g (5 oz)
- Operating system: Android 8.0 Oreo + EMUI 8
- System-on-chip: Y7/Prime 2018/Pro 2018/Enjoy 8/Nova 2 lite: Qualcomm MSM8937 Snapdragon 430 (28 nm); Honor 7C/Pro/Play 7C: Qualcomm SDM450 Snapdragon 450 (14 nm)
- CPU: Y7/Prime 2018/Pro 2018/Enjoy 8/Nova 2 lite: 8 cores (4×1.8 GHz Cortex-A53 + 4×1.1 GHz Cortex-A53); Honor 7C/Pro/Play 7C: 8×1.8 GHz Cortex-A53
- GPU: Y7/Prime 2018/Pro 2018/Enjoy 8/Nova 2i: Adreno 505; Honor 7C/Pro/Play 7C: Adreno 506
- Memory: Y7 2018: 2 GB; Y7 Prime 2018/Honor 7C/Play 7C: 3/4 GB; Y7 Pro 2018/Enjoy 8/Nova 2 lite/Honor 7C Pro: 3 GB
- Storage: Y7 2018: 16 GB; Y7 Prime 2018/Honor 7C/Play 7C: 32/64 GB; Y7 Pro 2018/Enjoy 8/Nova 2 lite/Honor 7C Pro: 32 GB eMMC 5.1
- Removable storage: microSD up to 256 GB
- SIM: Y7 2018: Nano-SIM or Dual SIM (Nano-SIM); Y7 Prime 2018/Pro 2018/Enjoy 8/Nova 2 lite/Honor 7C/Pro/Play 7C: Dual SIM (Nano-SIM)
- Battery: Non-removable, Li-Ion 3000 mAh
- Charging: 10 W
- Rear camera: Y7 2018: 13 MP, f/2.2, PDAF; Y7 Prime 2018/Pro 2018/Enjoy 8/Nova 2 lite/Honor 7C/Pro/Play 7C: 13 MP, f/2.2, PDAF + 2 MP (depth sensor); LED flash, HDR, panorama Video: 1080p@30fps
- Front camera: 8 MP, f/2.0 Video: 1080p@30fps
- Display: IPS LCD, 5.99", 1440 × 720 (720p HD+), 18:9, 269 ppi
- Sound: Mono sound
- Connectivity: Micro-USB 2.0, 3.5 mm Audio, Bluetooth 4.2 (A2DP, LE), NFC (depending on region for Y7 2018, Enjoy 8), FM radio, Wi-Fi 802.11 b/g/n (Wi-Fi Direct), GPS (A-GPS), GLONASS, BeiDou (Honor 7C/Pro/Play 7C)
- Data inputs: Touchscreen Multi-touch, 2 microphones, fingerprint scanner (rear-mounted, except Y7 Pro 2018), Proximity sensor, Accelerometer
- Model: Y7 2018: LDN-L01, LDN-LX3/LDN-L23; Y7 Prime 2018: LDN-LX1/LDN-L21; Y7 Pro 2018: LDN-L22; Enjoy 8: LDN-AL00, LDN-AL10, LDN-AL20, LDN-TL00, LDN-TL10, LDN-TL20; Nova 2 lite: LDN-LX2; Honor 7C: LND-L29, LND-AL30; Honor 7C Pro: LND-L29; Honor Play 7C: LND-AL30, LND-AL40, LND-TL30, LND-TL40
- Codename: Y7 2018/Prime 2018/Pro 2018/Enjoy 8/Nova 2 lite: London; Honor 7C/Pro/Play 7C: London 2

The Huawei Y7 2018 is an entry-level Android smartphone manufactured by Huawei as part of its "Y" series. Variants of the device include the Huawei Y7 Prime 2018, which features a dual-lens camera, and the Huawei Y7 Pro 2018, which also includes a dual camera but omits the NFC chip and fingerprint sensor. The Huawei Y7 Prime 2018 was announced as a budget option with a starting price of $250.

In certain markets, the Huawei Y7 Prime 2018 was sold under the name Huawei Nova 2 lite, while in China it was marketed as the Huawei Enjoy 8.

On 22 May 2018, Honor introduced the Honor 7C, which differs from the Huawei Y7 Prime 2018 by featuring a more powerful processor and a redesigned rear panel. In some regions, the smartphone was available as the Honor 7C Pro, while in China it was known as the Honor Play 7C.

== Design ==
The front of the device is made of 2.5D glass, while the frame and back panel are constructed from plastic.

The bottom edge houses the 3.5 mm audio jack, microUSB port, microphone, and speaker. The left side contains a card slot supporting either 1 SIM card and a memory card, or 2 SIM cards and a memory card depending on the specific Y7 2018 model, whereas all other variants feature a dedicated triple slot for 2 SIM cards and a memory card. The right side features the volume rocker and power button. Located above the display are the front-facing camera with a flash, the earpiece, and an ambient light/proximity sensor, with the brand logo positioned below the display. The rear panel features a slightly raised camera module housing a single lens (on the Y7 2018) or a dual-camera system with an LED flash, a secondary microphone, and the logo.

The smartphones are available in three color variations: black, blue, and gold. The blue variants of the Huawei Y7 2018 and Y7 Prime 2018/Enjoy 8/Nova 2 lite feature a glossy finish, while the Huawei Y7 Pro 2018 and Honor models utilize a matte finish.

== Hardware ==
The Huawei models are powered by a Qualcomm Snapdragon 430 system-on-chip with an Adreno 505 GPU, whereas the Honor models are built on the Snapdragon 450 with an Adreno 506 GPU. The Huawei Y7 2018 was offered in a 2/16 GB configuration; the Y7 Prime 2018 and Honor 7C were available in 3/32 GB and 4/64 GB options; the Enjoy 8, Nova 2 lite, and Honor 7C Pro came with 3/32 GB; and the Honor Play 7C offered configurations of 3/32 GB, 4/32 GB, 3/64 GB, and 4/64 GB. Internal storage can be expanded via a microSD card up to 256 GB.

The display is a 5.99-inch IPS panel featuring a resolution of 1440 × 720 pixels and an aspect ratio of 18:9.

The device is equipped with a non-removable 3000 mAh battery.

The Huawei Y7 2018 features a 13 MP primary camera with an aperture of f/2.2 and phase-detection autofocus (PDAF). The other variants complement this setup with a secondary 2 MP depth sensor to provide a bokeh effect. All models are equipped with an 8 MP front-facing camera with an aperture of f/2.0.

Connectivity support includes FDD-LTE, WCDMA, and GSM cellular networks, alongside Bluetooth and Wi-Fi Direct.

== Software ==
The devices run on the Android 8.0 Oreo operating system customized with the EMUI 8.0 user interface. Facial recognition for device unlocking is supported.

Supported audio formats include AMR-NB, AAC, AAC+, and eAAC+.

Supported video formats include H.263, H.264, and MPEG-4.
