= Huawei Y Max =

2018 smartphone from Huawei

Huawei Y Max (Huawei Enjoy Max in China) Honor 8X Max
- Brand: Huawei / Honor
- Manufacturer: Huawei
- Type: Phablet
- Series: Huawei Y/Enjoy, Honor X
- First released: Honor 8X Max: September 5, 2018; 7 years ago Enjoy Max: October 15, 2018; 7 years ago Y Max: November 2018; 7 years ago
- Related: Huawei Y5 2019; Huawei Y6 2019; Huawei Y7 2019; Huawei Y9 2019; Honor 8X
- Compatible networks: GSM, 3G, 4G (LTE)
- Form factor: Slate
- Colors: Y Max: Midnight Black, White, Amber Brown; Enjoy Max: Magic Night Black, Sky White, Amber Brown; Honor 8X Max: Black, Blue, and Red.
- Dimensions: H: 177.6 mm W: 86.2 mm D: Y Max/Enjoy Max: 8.5 mm Honor 8X Max: 8.1 mm
- Weight: 210 g (7 oz)
- Operating system: Initial: Android 8.1 + EMUI 8.2; Current (Honor 8X Max): Android 9 Pie + EMUI 9.1
- System-on-chip: Y Max/Enjoy Max/Honor 8X Max (6 GB): Qualcomm Snapdragon 660 (14 nm); Honor 8X Max (4 GB): Qualcomm Snapdragon 636 (14 nm)
- CPU: Y Max/Enjoy Max/Honor 8X Max (6 GB): Octa-core (4×1.95 GHz Kryo 260 Gold & 4×1.8 GHz Kryo 260 Silver); Honor 8X Max (4 GB): Octa-core (4×1.8 GHz Kryo 260 Gold & 4×1.6 GHz Kryo 260 Silver)
- GPU: Y Max/Enjoy Max/Honor 8X Max (6 GB): Adreno 512; Honor 8X Max (4 GB): Adreno 509
- Memory: Y Max/Enjoy Max: 4 GB; Honor 8X Max: 4/6 GB; LPDDR4X
- Storage: 64/128 GB; eMMC 5.1
- Removable storage: microSDXC up to 256 GB
- SIM: Dual SIM (Nano-SIM)
- Battery: Non-removable Li-Po 5000 mAh
- Charging: Y Max/Enjoy Max: 10 W Honor 8X Max: 18 W fast charging 5 W reverse wired charging
- Rear camera: 16 MP, f/2.0, PDAF + 2 MP, f/2.4 (depth sensor); LED flash, panorama, HDR; Video: 1080p@30fps
- Front camera: 8 MP, f/2.0 HDR; Video: 1080p@30fps
- Display: IPS LCD 7.12", 2244 × 1080 (FullHD+), 18.7:9, 350 ppi
- Sound: Stereo speakers
- Connectivity: MicroUSB 2.0, 3.5 mm audio jack, Bluetooth 4.2 (A2DP, LE), Wi-Fi 802.11 a/b/g/n/ac (dual-band, Wi-Fi Direct), GPS, A-GPS, GLONASS, BeiDou
- Data inputs: Fingerprint (rear-mounted), accelerometer, gyroscope, proximity sensor, compass
- Codename: Aries

The Huawei Y Max is a mid-range Android phablet from the "Y" series developed by Huawei, featuring a large display as its main highlight. It was introduced in November 2018. In China, the smartphone was marketed as the Huawei Enjoy Max.

The Honor 8X Max was announced alongside the Honor 8X on September 5, 2018 under Huawei's subsidiary brand, Honor. It differs from the Huawei Y Max in back panel materials, processor configurations (depending on RAM), and charging speeds.

== Design ==
The front panel is made of Corning Gorilla Glass 3. A leather was placed on the back panel of the Huawei Y Max and Enjoy Max, while the Honor 8X Max features a plastic gloss texture. The frame is made of aluminum.

The bottom houses the 3.5 mm audio jack, MicroUSB, a microphone, and a speaker, while the second microphone is at the top. The left side contains a slot for two SIM cards and a microSD card up to 256 GB. The right side features volume controls and the power button. The fingerprint scanner is located on the back panel.

The available color options differ from the following;

- The Huawei Y Max and Enjoy Max were available in three colors: Midnight/Magic Night Black, Sky White, and Amber Brown.
- The Honor 8X Max was available in three colors: Black, Blue, and Red.

== Specifications ==
=== Hardware ===
==== Platform ====
The Huawei Y Max, Enjoy Max, and the 6 GB RAM version of the Honor 8X Max are powered by the Qualcomm Snapdragon 660 processor with an Adreno 512 GPU. The 4 GB RAM version of the Honor 8X Max features the Qualcomm Snapdragon 636 processor with an Adreno 509 GPU.

==== Battery ====
The device features a large 5000 mAh battery. Additionally, the Honor 8X Max supports 18 W fast charging and 5 W reverse wired charging.

==== Camera ====
The models feature a dual main camera setup: 16 MP, f/2.0 with phase detection autofocus + 2 MP, f/2.4 (depth sensor), and an 8 MP, f/2.0 front camera. Both the main and front cameras can record video at 1080p@30fps.

==== Display ====
The display is a 7.12" IPS LCD with FullHD+ resolution (2244 × 1080), a pixel density of 350 ppi, an 18.7:9 aspect ratio, and a waterdrop notch for the front camera.

==== Sound ====
The smartphones feature stereo speakers with Dolby Atmos support. The earpiece functions as the second speaker.

==== Memory ====
The Huawei Y Max and Enjoy Max were sold in 4/64 GB and 4/128 GB configurations, while the Honor 8X Max was available in 4/64, 6/64, 4/128, and 6/128 GB versions.

=== Software ===
The smartphones were released with EMUI 8.2 based on Android 8.1 Oreo. The Honor 8X Max was updated to EMUI 9.1 based on Android 9 Pie.
