= Vivo V19 =

2020 Android-based smartphone from Vivo

- Brand: Vivo
- Manufacturer: Vivo Communication Technology Co
- Series: Vivo V series
- Availability by region: Global: April 29, 2020; 6 years ago
- Predecessor: Vivo V17
- Successor: Vivo V20
- Dimensions: 159.6 mm (6.28 in) H 75 mm (3.0 in) W 8.5 mm (0.33 in) D
- Weight: 186.5 g (6.58 oz)
- Operating system: Funtouch OS 10 based on Android 10
- System-on-chip: Qualcomm Snapdragon 712 (10 nm)
- CPU: Octa-core (2x2.3 GHz Kryo 360 Gold & 6x1.7 GHz Kryo 360 Silver)
- GPU: Adreno 616
- Memory: 8 GB LPDDR4X RAM
- Storage: 128, 256 GB UFS 2.1
- Removable storage: microSD
- Battery: 4500 mAh
- Charging: 33 W fast-charging, Vivo Flash Charge 2.0
- Rear camera: 48 MP f/1.8 wide (1/2.0", 0.8 μm, PDAF) 8 MP f/2.2, 13mm ultrawide, (1/4.0", 1.12 μm); 2 MP f/2.4 macro 2 MP f/2.4 depth sensor
- Front camera: 32 MP f/2.1, 23mm (wide) (1/2.8", 0.8 μm); 8 MP f/2.3, 17mm ultrawide
- Display: 6.44 in (164 mm) Super AMOLED HDR10 display with 1080 × 2400 resolution, ~83.7% screen-to-body ratio, 20:9 aspect ratio, ~409 ppi density, and 800 nits peak brightness
- Sound: Loudspeaker
- Data inputs: USB-C, 3.5 mm audio jack Sensors: Fingerprint (under display, optical); Accelerometer; Gyroscope; Proximity; Compass
- Website: Global; Neo; Indonesia

The Vivo V19 is an Android-based smartphone manufactured by Vivo Communication Technology Co. The phone was announced and released in April 2020. The phone is highlighted by a quad-camera setup, including a 48 MP main sensor, a 6.44 in (164 mm) Super AMOLED, 1080p display, up to 256 GB UFS 2.1 storage, 8 GB RAM, and a 4500 mAh battery capable of 33 W Vivo Fast Charge 2.0.

== Specifications ==
=== Design ===
The Vivo V19 has Gorilla Glass 6 for the front and back glass, while the frame is constructed of plastic. The phone comes in two colors, Mystic Silver and Piano Black, the latter, according to Vivo, allows the owner to "feel the magic of the constellations."

=== Hardware ===
The Vivo V19 measures 159.6 mm (6.28 in) x 75 mm (3.0 in) x 8.5 mm (0.33 in) and weighs 186.5 g (6.58 oz). It packs an octa-core (2x2.3 GHz Kryo 360 Gold & 6x1.7 GHz Kryo 360 Silver), 10 nm Qualcomm Snapdragon 712 processor with a Adreno 616 GPU. It has a 4500 mAh lithium polymer battery, capable of up to 33 W Vivo Flash Charge 2.0, which the company claims charges from 0% to 70% in 40 minutes. The phone has 8 GB LPDDR4X RAM and, depending on the configuration, can have either 128 or 256 GB of UFS 2.1 storage. The phone includes Copper Tube Liquid Cooling Technology, which the company claims lowers the CPU junction temperature by "up to 3°C to 7°."

==== Camera ====
The Vivo V19 has a total of 6 cameras- 4 on the rear and 2 in the front. The rear cameras are arranged in the shape of an L, with 3 cameras vertically and one camera to the right of the bottom lens. This array is situated in the top left corner of the back glass. There is also an LED flash placed above the top lens. The rear camera array consists of a 48 MP f/1.8, 1/2.0", 0.8 μm, wide lens with PDAF, an 8 MP, f/2.2, 1/4.0", 1.12 μm, 13mm ultrawide lens, a 2 MP, f/2.4, macro lens for close ups, and a 2 MP, f/2.4, depth sensor for background blur in portrait shots. The main camera can shoot video up to 4K at 30 fps and up to 60 fps with a lower 1080p resolution. The dual front-facing cameras are housed in a pill-shaped cutout in the top right corner of the display. The array consists of a 32 MP, f/2.1, 1/2.8", 0.8 μm, 23mm wide lens and an 8 MP, f/2.3, 17mm ultrawide lens.

== Vivo V19 Neo ==
The Vivo V19 Neo, a lower-end variant of the Vivo V19, was made available a month after the original was released. Another phone, simply called the Vivo V19, was released exclusively in Indonesia with an identical design and identical specs compared to the Neo. The Neo has the same display, quad-camera setup, RAM/storage configurations, operating system, battery, GPU, and sensors as the V19. However, it has a slightly smaller and lighter build, measuring in at 159 mm (6.3 in) x 74.2 mm (2.92 in) x 8.5 mm (0.33 in) and weighing 176 g (6.2 oz). The processor is slightly downgraded, being an octa-core (2x2.0 GHz Kryo 460 Gold & 6x1.7 GHz Kryo 460 Silver) Snapdragon 675 SoC. It also lacks the 8 MP ultrawide front-facing camera. While it has the same 4500 mAh battery, it only supports 18 W fast-charging. The colors for the Neo are Admiral Blue and Crystal White.
