= Huawei Y3 (2018) =

Smartphone model

- Manufacturer: Huawei
- Type: Smartphone
- Series: Huawei Y
- First released: May 2018
- Predecessor: Huawei Y3 (2017)
- Related: Huawei Y5 (2018); Huawei Y6 (2018); Huawei Y7 (2018); Huawei Y9 (2018)
- Compatible networks: GSM, 3G, 4G (LTE)
- Form factor: Slate
- Colors: Gold, White, Gray
- Dimensions: 145.1×73.7×9.5 mm (5.71×2.90×0.37 in)
- Weight: 175 g (6 oz)
- Operating system: Android 8.1 Oreo (Go Edition)
- System-on-chip: MediaTek MT6737M (28 nm)
- CPU: 4×1.1 GHz Cortex-A53
- GPU: Mali-T720MP2
- Memory: 1GB RAM
- Storage: 8GB eMMC 5.0
- Battery: Li-Ion 2280 mAh, non-removable
- Rear camera: 8 MP, f/2.0, AF, LED flash Video: 720p@30fps
- Front camera: 2 MP; Video: 720p@30fps
- Display: IPS LCD, 5.0", 854 × 480, 16:9, 196 ppi
- Connectivity: WLAN: Wi-Fi 802.11 b/g/n, hotspot Bluetooth: 4.0, A2DP

The Huawei Y3 (2018) (stylized as HUAWEI Y3 2018) is an entry-level of Android smartphone developed by Huawei, notable for its use of a special lightweight version of Android called Android Go. It was unveiled on May 9, 2018.

== Design ==
The front of the Huawei Y3 (2018) is made of glass and the case is made of matte plastic.

At the bottom, there is a microUSB connector and a microphone. At the top, there is a 3.5 mm audio jack. On the right side, there are volume control buttons and a power button. On the back panel, there is a speaker, the main camera module, and an LED flash. By removing the back panel, it can also access the slots for two SIM cards and a microSD memory card up to 128 GB.

The Huawei Y3 (2018) has 3 color options: Gold, White, and Gray.

== Technical specifications ==
=== Hardware ===
The Huawei Y3 (2018) is equipped with a MediaTek MT6737M SoC and a Mali-T720MP2 GPU. The smartphone was sold with 1 GB of RAM and 8 GB of internal storage.

The phone's battery capacity is 2280 mAh.

The Huawei Y3 (2018) has a 5-inch IPS LCD screen with a 854 x 480 pixels resoulution, a 196 ppi pixel density and a 16:9 aspect ratio.

The smartphone features an 8MP rear camera with an f/2.0 aperture and autofocus, and a 2MP front-facing camera. Both cameras are capable of recording video at 720p@30fps resolution.

=== Software ===
The smartphone was released on a lightweight version of Android called Android Go version 8.1 Oreo. The firmware itself on the smartphone looks like a "pure" version of Android, except for the modified icons, home screen, and update menu.
