= Honor 8X =

2018 smartphone by Honor

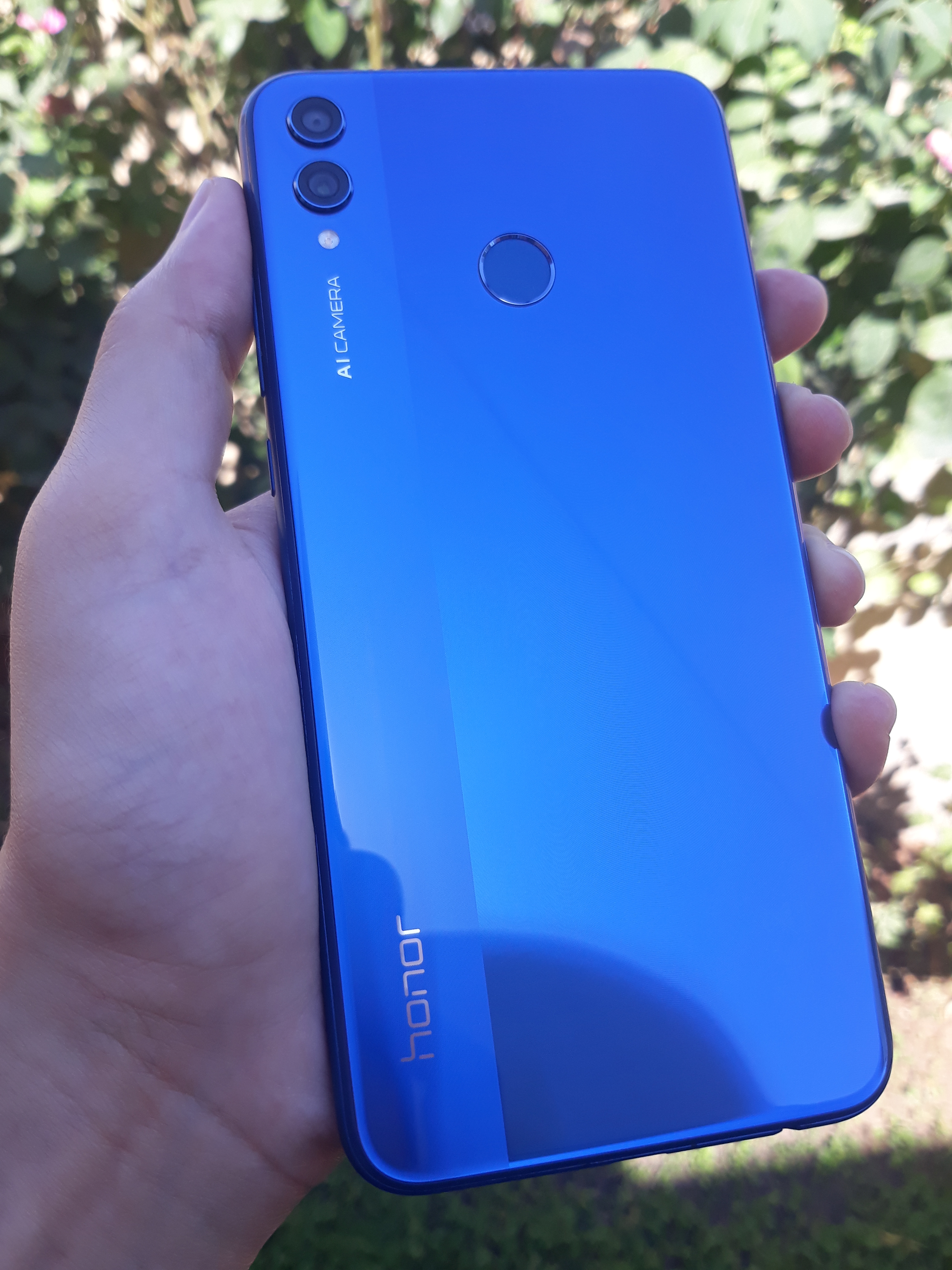
- Reverse side of the Honor 8X
- Brand: Honor
- Manufacturer: Huawei
- Type: Slate
- Series: Honor X series
- First released: October 24, 2018; 8 years ago
- Units sold: 15 million
- Predecessor: Honor 7X
- Successor: Honor 9X
- Form factor: Smartphone+ hard Phone
- Dimensions: 160.4 mm (6.31 in) H 76.6 mm (3.02 in) W 7.8 mm (0.31 in) D
- Weight: 175 g (6.2 oz)
- Operating system: Original: Android Oreo with EMUI 8.0; Current: Android 10 with EMUI 10.0
- System-on-chip: HiSilicon Kirin 710
- CPU: Octa-core (4x2.2 GHz Cortex-A73 & 4x1.7 GHz Cortex-A53)
- GPU: Mali-G51 MP4
- Memory: 4 or 6GB RAM
- Storage: 64 or 128GB
- Removable storage: microSD, up to 400GB
- Battery: 3750 mAh
- Rear camera: Dual (20MP + 2MP), laser autofocus, autofocus, AI filter, Burst mode, f/2.2 aperture, 1080p video recording at 30 fps or 1080p at slow-motion video (1080p timelapse with stabilization, panorama, facial recognition, digital image stabilization, optical image stabilization 1080p 60FPS video, LED flash
- Front camera: 16MP, f/2.2 aperture, exposure control, face detection, auto-HDR, auto image stabilization, Retina flash, 1080p HD video recording
- Display: 6.5 in (170 mm) FHD (1080 x 2340 pixels)
- Connectivity: Hybrid Dual SIM (nano + nano/microSD), LTE Cat.6, Wi-Fi a/b/g/n/ac (2,4/5 GHz), Bluetooth 4.2, GPS, NFC (JSN-L21 only), microUSB 2.0
- Other: Hall sensor; Infrared sensor; FaceID Screen Lock; Fingerprint (rear-mounted); Proximity sensor; Ambient light sensor; Digital compass; Gravity sensor; Gyroscope; Status indicator
- Website: Honor 8X

The Honor 8X (also known as an Honor View 10 Lite) is a smartphone made by Huawei under their Honor sub-brand. It is a successor of the Huawei Honor 7X within the Huawei Honor series.

== Specifications ==
=== Display and Camera ===
The Honor 8X has a 6.5-inch FHD+ display with a screen resolution of 1,080 × 2,340 pixels, has a pixel density of 396 PPI, and has a 19.5:9 aspect ratio. The phone has 20 megapixel dual rear camera, a rear 2 megapixel LDAP depth sensor, and one front 16MP front camera.

One feature that is advertised is its "AI Photography", which attempts to improve images by adjusting colours and focus based on the type of scene.

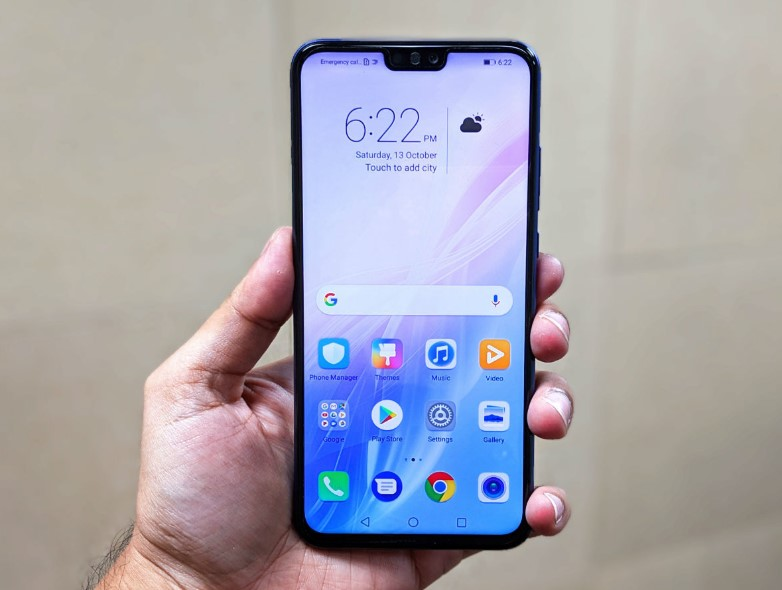
Honor 8X home screen

=== Configuration and specifications ===
The base model Honor 8X has 64GB of internal storage, and 4GB of RAM. It can be purchased with up to 128GB of internal storage and 6GB of RAM. The internal storage can be expanded with a microSD card.

This device is powered by Huawei's HiSilicon Kirin 710 chipset with two quad-core Cortex A53 processors. The GPU is a Mali-T830 MP2.

It has a rear-mounted fingerprint scanner.

The Honor 8X uses a 3,750 mAh lithium polymer battery.

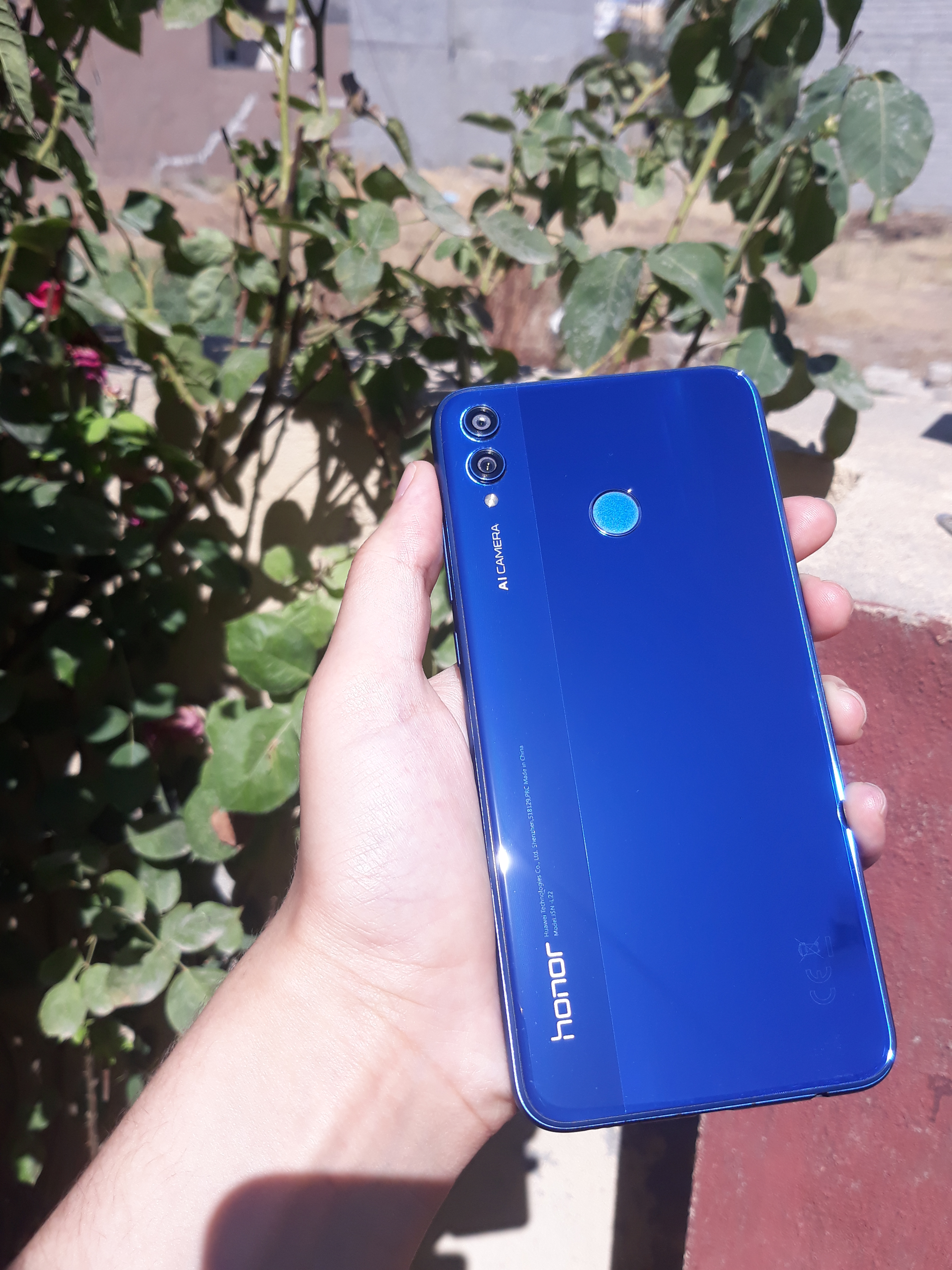
Glass Body with Visual Grating Effect

=== Connectivity ===
The phone supports 4G connectivity, and has two nano-sim slots. It supports Wi-Fi 802.11, Bluetooth 4.2, GPS, and has an FM radio receiver.

Charging is done via a micro-USB port. A bottom 3.5 mm audio jack supports wired headphones.

=== Software ===
The Honor 8X launched with Android (Oreo) and Huawei's EMUI 8.0, and can be upgraded to HarmonyOS 3.0 with EMUI 10.0
