= Vivo V17 =

2020 Android entry-level smartphones developed by Vivo

Vivo V17 (Vivo Y9s in China; Vivo S1 Pro) Vivo X50 Lite (Vivo Y51)
- Brand: vivo
- Type: Phablet
- Series: V/Y/S/X
- First released: S1 Pro: November 19, 2019; 6 years ago V17: November 23, 2019; 6 years ago Y9s: December 3, 2019; 6 years ago X50 Lite: May 12, 2020; 6 years ago Y51: September 15, 2020; 6 years ago
- Availability by region: China: Vivo Y9s; Worldwide
- Predecessor: Vivo V15
- Successor: Vivo V19
- Related: Vivo V17 Pro; Vivo V17 Neo; Vivo X50
- Compatible networks: GSM, 3G, 4G (LTE)
- Form factor: Slate
- Dimensions: 159.3×75.2×8.7 mm (6.27×2.96×0.34 in)
- Weight: 186.7 g (7 oz)
- Operating system: Initial: V17 & S1 Pro & Y9s: Android 9 Pie + FuntouchOS 9 X50 Lite & Y51: Android 10 + FuntouchOS 10 Current: Android 10 + FuntouchOS 10
- CPU: Qualcomm SDM665 Snapdragon 665 (11 nm), 8 cores (4x2.0 GHz Kryo 260 Gold & 4x1.8 GHz Kryo 260 Silver)
- GPU: Adreno 610
- Memory: V17 & S1 Pro & Y9s & X50 Lite: 8 GB; Y51: 4 GB; LPDDR4X
- Storage: 128 GB UFS 2.1
- Removable storage: MicroSDXC up to 512 GB
- Battery: Non-removable, Li-Po 4500 mAh, 18W fast charging
- Rear camera: 48 MP, f/1.8 (wide), 1/2.0", 0.8μm, PDAF + 8 MP, f/2.2, 13 mm (ultrawide), 1/4.0", 1.12μm + 2 MP, f/2.4 (macro) + 2 MP, f/2.4 (depth sensor); LED flash, HDR, panorama Video: 1080p@30fps, gyro-EIS (Y51)
- Front camera: V17 & S1 Pro & Y9s: 32 MP, f/2.0, 26 mm (wide), 1/2.8", 0.8μm X50 Lite & Y51: 16 MP, f/2.0 (wide), 1/3.06", 1.0μm HDR; Video: 1080p@30fps
- Display: Super AMOLED / AMOLED (X50 Lite), 6.38", 2340 x 1080 (FullHD+), 19.5:9, 404 ppi
- Connectivity: USB-C 2.0, 3.5 mm Audio, Bluetooth 5.0 (A2DP, LE), NFC (V17 & X50 Lite), Wi-Fi 802.11 a/b/g/n/ac (dual-band, Wi-Fi Direct, hotspot), GPS, A-GPS, GLONASS, BDS, GALILEO (except Y9s)
- Data inputs: Fingerprint scanner (under-display, optical), proximity sensor, accelerometer, gyroscope, compass

The Vivo V17 (stylized as vivo V17) is a series of smartphone developed by Vivo. It was unveiled on November 19, 2019. In some countries, the smartphone was sold under the names Vivo Y9s and Vivo S1 Pro. Additionally, on May 12, 2020, the Vivo X50 Lite was introduced, which is a similar model to the Vivo V17, differing only in its front camera. In some countries, the Vivo X50 Lite is sold as the Vivo Y51.

== Design ==
The screen is made of glass. The body is made of glossy plastic.

Below, there is a USB-C port, a speaker, and a microphone. At the top, there is a secondary microphone and a 3.5 mm audio jack. On the left side, there is a slot for two SIM cards and a MicroSD memory card up to 512 GB. On the right side, there are volume buttons and a smartphone lock button.

These color options may vary depending on the model:

- The Vivo V17 was sold in Neon Blue and Pink Pearl colors.
- The Vivo S1 Pro was sold in Knight Black (Black) and Fancy Sky (Pink) colors.
- The Vivo Y9s was sold in 3 colors: Knight Black (Black), Nebula Blue (Blue), and Fancy Sky (Pink).
- The Vivo X50 Lite is sold in Jade Black (Black-Light blue) and Nebula Blue (Blue) colors.
- The Vivo Y51 is sold in 3 colors: Mystic Black (Black), Jazzy Blue (Blue), and Dreamy White (Pink).

== Technical specifications ==
=== Platform (CPU & GPU) ===
The smartphones feature a Qualcomm Snapdragon 665 processor and an Adreno 610 graphics processor.

=== Battery ===
The battery has a capacity of 4500 mAh and supports 18 W fast charging.

=== Cameras ===
The smartphones feature a 48 MP, f/1.8 (wide) + 8 MP, f/2.2 (ultrawide) + 2 MP, f/2.4 (macro) + 2 MP, f/2.4 (depth sensor) quad main camera with phase detection autofocus and 1080p@30fps video recording capability.

The Vivo V17, S1 Pro, and Y9s have a 32 MP, f/2.0 (wide) front camera, while the X50 Lite and Y51 have a 16 MP, f/2.0 (wide) front camera. All models can record video at 1080p@30fps.

=== Display ===
The X50 Lite features an AMOLED display, while the others use Super AMOLED, measuring 6.38" with FullHD+ (2340 x 1080) resolution, a pixel density of 404 ppi, a 19.5:9 aspect ratio, and a waterdrop notch for the front camera. An in-display fingerprint scanner is also integrated.

=== Memory ===
The Vivo Y51 is available in a 4/128 GB configuration. All other models are available in an 8/128 GB configuration.

=== Software ===
The Vivo V17, S1 Pro, and Y9s were released with FuntouchOS 9 based on Android 9 Pie. They were updated to FuntouchOS 10 based on Android 10.

The Vivo X50 Lite and Y51 were released with FuntouchOS 10 based on Android 10.
