= Honor 9C =

2020 smartphone model

Honor 9C Honor Play 3 (China)
- Brand: Honor
- Manufacturer: Huawei
- Type: Smartphone
- Series: C/Play
- First released: Play 3: September 4, 2019; 6 years ago 9C: April 29, 2020; 6 years ago
- Availability by region: 9C: Europe: Belarus; Russia; Asia: Iraq; Play 3: China
- Predecessor: Honor 8C
- Successor: Honor X7; Honor X8; Honor Play 4
- Related: Honor 9A; Honor 9S
- Compatible networks: GSM, 3G, 4G (LTE)
- Form factor: Slate
- Colors: 9C: Midnight Black, Aurora Blue; Play 3: Magic Night Black, Aurora Blue, Charm Red
- Dimensions: 159.8×76.1×8.1 mm (6.29×3.00×0.32 in)
- Weight: 176 g (6 oz)
- Operating system: 9C: Android 10 without Google Play Services, Magic UI 3.1; Play 3: Initial: Android 9 Pie without Google Play Services, EMUI 9.1; Current: HarmonyOS 2.0
- System-on-chip: 9C: HiSilicon Kirin 710A (14 nm); Play 3: HiSilicon Kirin 710F (12 nm)
- CPU: Octa-core (4×2.0 GHz Cortex-A73 & 4×1.7 GHz Cortex-A53)
- GPU: Mali-G51 MP4
- Memory: 9C: 4 GB; Play 3: 4/6 GB; LPDDR4
- Storage: 9C: 64 GB; Play 3: 64/128 GB eMMC 5.1
- Removable storage: microSDXC up to 512 GB
- SIM: Dual SIM (Nano-SIM)
- Battery: Non-removable, Li-Po 4000 mAh
- Charging: 10 W
- Rear camera: 48 MP, f/1.8 (wide-angle), 1/2.0", 0.8 µm, PDAF + 8 MP, f/2.4, 120˚ (ultrawide) + 2 MP, f/2.4, (depth); LED flash, HDR, panorama Video: 1080p@30fps
- Front camera: 8 MP, f/2.0 (wide-angle); HDR; Video: 1080p@30fps
- Display: IPS LCD, 6.39", 1560 × 720 (HD+), 19.5:9, 269 ppi
- Connectivity: MicroUSB 2.0, 3.5 mm audio jack, Bluetooth 5.0 (A2DP, LE), NFC (9C), FM radio (Play 3), Wi-Fi 802.11 b/g/n (Wi-Fi Direct, hotspot), GPS, A-GPS, GLONASS, BDS
- Made in: China
- Other: Fingerprint scanner (rear-mounted on 9C), proximity sensor, accelerometer, compass

The Honor 9C is an Android smartphone developed by the Huawei sub-brand Honor, which features a 48 MP camera at a relatively low price point. It was introduced on April 29, 2020, in Russia alongside the Honor 9A and Honor 9S. Also, sales start on May 4, 2020.

Additionally, the Honor Play 3 was introduced for China on September 4, 2019, alongside the Honor 20S; it mainly differs from the Honor 9C in its processor and the lack of a fingerprint scanner.

== Specifications ==
=== Design ===
The screen is made of glass. The back panel is made of glossy plastic, while the side frame is matte.

The smartphones are identical in dimensions. In terms of design, the Honor Play 3 differs from the 9C by the absence of a fingerprint scanner and a V-shaped reflection pattern, whereas the 9C features a pixel-beam reflection effect.

Located at the bottom are the microUSB port, speaker, microphone, and 3.5 mm audio jack. A second microphone is located at the top. The left side houses a slot for two SIM cards and a microSD card up to 512 GB on the 9C, while the Play 3 features a hybrid slot for either two SIM cards or one SIM card and a microSD card. The volume buttons and the power button are located on the right side.

The Honor 9C was sold in Midnight Black and Aurora Blue.

The Honor Play 3 was sold in three colors: Magic Night Black, Aurora Blue, and Charm Red.

=== Processor ===
The Honor 9C features a HiSilicon Kirin 710A processor manufactured using a 14 nm process, while the Play 3 uses the Kirin 710F manufactured on a 12 nm process. Both processors are paired with a Mali-G51 MP4 GPU.

=== Battery ===
The battery is lithium polymer and has a capacity of 4000 mAh with 10W standard charging.

=== Cameras ===
The smartphone features a triple rear camera setup: 48 MP, f/1.8 (wide-angle) with phase-detection autofocus + 8 MP, f/2.4 (ultrawide) + 2 MP, f/2.4 (depth sensor). The front camera has a resolution of 8 MP and an aperture of f/2.0 (wide-angle). Both the main and front cameras can record video at 1080p@30fps.

=== Display ===
The display is an IPS LCD, 6.39", HD+ (1560 × 720) with a pixel density of 269 ppi, a 19.5:9 aspect ratio, and a circular cutout for the front camera located in the top-left corner.

=== Storage ===
The Honor 9C was sold in a 4/64 GB configuration,

while the Honor Play 3 was sold in 4/64, 4/128, and 6/128 GB configurations.

=== Software ===
The Honor 9C runs on Magic UI 3.1 based on Android 10 without Google Play Services. Huawei's AppGallery is used for installing applications.

The Honor Play 3 was released with EMUI 9.1 based on Android 9 Pie without Google Play Services. It was later updated to HarmonyOS 2.0.
