= Honor 8A =

Android smartphone

Honor 8A / Pro / Prime / 2020 Honor Play 8A Huawei Y6s Huawei Enjoy 9e
- Brand: Honor / Huawei
- Manufacturer: Huawei
- Type: Smartphone
- Series: Honor A / Play; Huawei Y / Enjoy
- First released: Honor Play 8A: January 5, 2019; 7 years ago Huawei Enjoy 9e: March 25, 2019; 7 years ago Honor 8A Prime: March 31, 2019; 7 years ago Honor 8A: April 2019; 7 years ago Honor 8A Pro: April 12, 2019; 7 years ago Huawei Y6s: January 28, 2020; 6 years ago Honor 8A 2020: April 10, 2020; 6 years ago
- Predecessor: Honor 7A; Honor 7A / 7A Pro; Huawei Enjoy 8e Huawei Y6 2019
- Successor: Honor 9A; Huawei Y6p
- Compatible networks: GSM, 3G, 4G (LTE)
- Form factor: Slate
- Colors: Honor 8A / Pro / Play 8A: Black, Blue, Red, Gold; Honor 8A Prime: Black, Blue, Green; Honor 8A 2020: Black, Blue; Huawei Y6s: Starry Black, Orchid Blue; Huawei Enjoy 9e: Midnight Black, Sapphire Blue, Amber Brown
- Dimensions: 156.28 mm (6.153 in) H 73.5 mm (2.89 in) W 8 mm (0.31 in) D
- Weight: 150 g (5.3 oz)
- Operating system: Initial: Honor 8A / Pro / Prime / 2020 / Play 8A / Huawei Enjoy 9e: Android 9 Pie, EMUI 9.0; Huawei Y6s: Android 9 Pie, EMUI 9.1; Current: Android 9 Pie, EMUI 9.1
- System-on-chip: MediaTek MT6765 Helio P35 (12 nm)
- CPU: Octa-core (4x2.3 GHz Cortex-A53 & 4x1.8 GHz Cortex-A53)
- GPU: PowerVR GE8320 (680 MHz)
- Memory: Honor 8A: 2 GB; Honor 8A Pro: 2/3 GB; Honor 8A 2020 / Prime / Play 8A / Huawei Y6s / Enjoy 9e: 3 GB; LPDDR3
- Storage: Honor 8A: 32 GB; Honor 8A Pro / Play 8A / Huawei Y6s / Enjoy 9e: 32/64 GB; Honor 8A 2020 / Prime: 64 GB eMMC 5.1
- Removable storage: microSDXC up to 512 GB
- SIM: Dual SIM (Nano-SIM); Huawei Y6s: Nano-SIM or Dual SIM (Nano-SIM)
- Battery: Non-removable Li-Po 3020 mAh
- Rear camera: 13 MP, f/1.8, PDAF; LED flash, panorama, HDR; Video: 1080p@30fps
- Front camera: 8 MP, f/2.0 LED flash (Huawei Enjoy 9e), HDR; Video: 1080p@30fps
- Display: IPS LCD, 6.09", 1560 × 720 (HD+), 19.5:9 ratio, 282 ppi
- Model: Honor 8A / Prime / 2020: JAT-LX1; Honor 8A Pro: JAT-L41, JAT-LX1, JAT-LX3; Honor Play 8A: JAT-L09, JAT-L29, JAT-AL00, JAT-TL00; Huawei Y6s: JAT-LX1, JAT-LX3, JAT-L29; Huawei Enjoy 9e: MRD-AL00, MRD-TL00
- Website: consumer.huawei.com/en/phones/y6s/

The Honor 8A is an entry-level Android smartphone developed by Huawei under the Honor brand.

In some countries, the Honor 8A was released as the Honor 8A Pro, Honor 8A Prime (Russia), or Honor 8A 2020 (UK), featuring differences in memory configurations and back cover design in the case of the Honor 8A Prime. In China, the smartphone was sold as the Honor Play 8A, differing in memory configurations and the absence of a fingerprint scanner.

On March 25, 2019, the Huawei Enjoy 9e was introduced in China, differing from the Honor 8A in memory configurations, a design similar to the Huawei Y6 2019, the lack of a fingerprint scanner, and the inclusion of a front LED flash. On January 28, 2020, the Huawei Y6s was introduced, differing from the Honor 8A only in memory configurations and rear panel finish.

== Specifications ==
=== Hardware ===
The back panel and frame are made of plastic. The front features an 87% screen-to-body ratio display with a waterdrop notch for the front camera and a logo on the bottom bezel. The screen is covered by 2.5D protective glass. The front face of the device is black in all color options. The rear surface of the Honor 8A/2020/Pro and Honor Play 8A features a matte strip with the company logo on a glossy finish, while the blue variant of the Huawei Y6s is split into a top glossy section and a bottom matte section, similar to the original Google Pixel smartphones. Meanwhile, the brown variant of the Huawei Enjoy 9e features a faux leather texture, similar to the Huawei Y6 2019.

The smartphones measure 156.28 mm in length, 73.5 mm in width, 8 mm in thickness, and weigh 150 g.

At the bottom are the microUSB port, speaker, and primary microphone, while the top houses a secondary microphone and a 3.5 mm audio jack. The left side contains a card slot (either dual-SIM + microSD or single-SIM + microSD depending on the Huawei Y6s variant, and dual-SIM + microSD for all other models). The right side holds the volume rocker and power button. Additionally, all models except the Honor Play 8A and Huawei Enjoy 9e feature a rear-mounted fingerprint scanner.

The Honor 8A/Pro and Play 8A were available in 4 colors: Black, Blue, Red, and Gold.

The Honor 8A 2020 was available in Black and Blue.

The Honor 8A Prime was available in 3 colors: Black, Blue, and Green.

The Huawei Y6s was sold in Starry Black and Orchid Blue.

The Huawei Enjoy 9e was sold in 3 colors: Midnight Black, Sapphire Blue, and Amber Brown.

The devices are powered by an 8-core MediaTek Helio P35 processor paired with a PowerVR GE8320 GPU. The Honor 8A was available in a 2/32 GB configuration; the Honor 8A 2020/Prime in 3/64 GB; and the Honor Play 8A, Huawei Y6s, and Enjoy 9e in 3/32 GB and 3/64 GB options. All models support storage expansion via microSD up to 512 GB.

The display is a 6.09-inch IPS LCD with HD+ resolution (1560 × 720), a pixel density of 282 ppi, a 19.5:9 aspect ratio, and a waterdrop notch.

The devices feature a non-removable 3020 mAh battery.

The smartphones include a 13 MP main camera with an f/1.8 aperture and phase-detection autofocus (PDAF), along with an 8 MP front camera with an f/2.0 aperture. Both cameras support video recording up to 1080p at 30fps. Additionally, the Huawei Enjoy 9e features a front-facing LED flash.

The devices support 2G, 3G (850/900/1800/1900 MHz), and 4G CAT4 (bands 1/3/5/7/8/20) connectivity, as well as Wi-Fi 802.11 b/g/n (2.4 GHz only), Bluetooth 4.2 (A2DP, BLE, HWA, LDAC), NFC (JAT-LX1 model), and GPS/A-GPS, GLONASS, and BeiDou navigation systems.

=== Software ===
The Huawei Y6s was released running EMUI 9.1, while all other models launched with EMUI 9.0 (upgradable to EMUI 9.1). Both software skins are based on Android 9 Pie.

The system supports facial recognition unlock alongside traditional passcode entry.

Preceded by Honor 7A	Honor 8A; 2019	Succeeded by Honor 9A
Preceded by Honor 7A	Honor 8A 2020; 2020	Succeeded by Honor 9A
Preceded by Honor 7A / 7A Pro	Honor 8A Pro; 2019	Current holder
Preceded by Honor Play 7A	Honor Play 8A; 2019	Succeeded by Honor Play 9A
Preceded by Huawei Y6 2019	Huawei Y6s; 2020	Succeeded by Huawei Y6p
Preceded by Huawei Enjoy 8e	Huawei Enjoy 9e 2019	Succeeded by Huawei Enjoy 10e
