= Magic OS =

Android-based mobile operating system by Honor

MagicOS
- Developer: Honor
- OS family: Android, Linux, Unix-like
- Working state: Current
- Source model: Free software with proprietary components
- Initial release: December 2016; 9 years ago
- Latest release: MagicOS 11.0 / September 28, 2026; 51 days ago
- Update method: Firmware over-the-air
- Package manager: HONOR App Market and APK files
- Supported platforms: 32-bit and 64-bit ARM
- License: Proprietary
- Official website: honor.com

MagicOS is an Android-based mobile operating system developed by Honor for its smartphones and tablets. The software evolved from the earlier Magic Live and Magic UI interfaces and adopted the MagicOS name in 2022.

== History ==
Honor introduced the Magic Live software platform alongside the original Honor Magic smartphone in December 2016. While the brand was part of Huawei, Honor devices used interfaces related to Huawei's EMUI, including Magic UI. An Android 10-based Magic UI 3 update was released for the Honor View 20 and Honor 20 in 2019.

Honor became independent of Huawei following the sale of the brand in November 2020. Honor unveiled MagicOS 7.0 on 22 November 2022, with the Honor 80 series and Honor Magic Vs among the first devices to use it.

MagicOS 8.0 was unveiled on 10 January 2024, introducing an intent-based user interface with AI-assisted functions. MagicOS 9.0 followed on 23 October 2024, with additional artificial intelligence capabilities for the YOYO assistant. MagicOS 10.0 was introduced on 15 October 2025 alongside the Honor Magic8 series and is based on Android 16.

On 15 September 2026, Honor announced MagicOS 11, based on Android 17, at its developer conference in Shenzhen. It introduced additional task automation through YOYO, a redesigned interface with translucent visual effects, and expanded connections with devices from other manufacturers. The Honor Magic9 series, which went on sale in China on 28 September 2026, was the first smartphone lineup shipped with MagicOS 11.

== Version history ==
| Version | Android version | Year introduced | Version number | References |
|---|---|---|---|---|
| Magic Live | Android Marshmallow (6) | 2016 | 1.1 | |
| Magic UI 2 | Android Pie (9) | 2018 | 2.1 | |
| Magic UI 3 | Android 10 | 2019 | 3.1 | |
| Magic UI 4 | Android 11 | 2020 | 4.2 | |
| Magic UI 5 | Android 10 and Android 11 | 2021 | 5.1 | |
| Magic UI 6 | Android 12 | 2022 | 6.2 | |
| MagicOS 7 | Android 13 | 2022 | 7.2 | |
| MagicOS 8 | Android 14 | 2024 | 8.3 | |
| MagicOS 9 | Android 15 | 2024 | 9.0 | |
| MagicOS 10 | Android 16 | 2025 | 10.0 | |
| MagicOS 11 | Android 17 | 2026 | 11.0 | |
