= 2007 in the environment =

This is a list of notable events relating to the environment in 2007. They relate to environmental law, conservation, environmentalism and environmental issues.

== Events ==
- The IPCC Fourth Assessment Report is released
- The Baiji, a freshwater dolphin that lived in the Yangtze River in China is declared extinct. The population declined drastically as China became industrialized and made heavy use of the river for fishing, transportation, and hydroelectricity.
- The town of Wittenoom in Western Australia is disestablished due to asbestos contamination from past mining operations.
- Friends of the Earth run the Big Ask Campaign calling for a new climate change law in the United Kingdom and 15 other EU member states.

=== January ===
- The Cebu Declaration on East Asian Energy Security was signed. The signatories have agreed to promote energy security and find energy alternatives to conventional fuels.
- A $400 million plan was announced to clean up the Sydney Tar Ponds, a hazardous waste site on Cape Breton Island, Nova Scotia, Canada.

=== March ===
- The first Earth Hour was held on March 31.

=== April ===
- The great white sharks are given full protection in New Zealand waters.

=== May ===
- The International Whaling Commission meeting was held in Anchorage, Alaska in the United States.

=== June ===
- On World Environment Day (June 5), Dell Inc. CEO Michael Dell launched a corporate campaign called ReGeneration, of consumers committed to recycling, renewable energy, and broader environmental stewardship.

=== July ===
- The Climate Change and Emissions Management Amendment Act of the Canadian province of Alberta passed into law. It was the first law of its type to impose greenhouse gas cuts on large industrial facilities.

=== September ===
- The Sydney APEC Leaders' Declaration on Climate Change, Energy Security and Clean Development (Sydney Declaration) was adopted at APEC Australia 2007 on 8 September. The agreement indicates the wish of signatories to work towards aspirational goals on energy efficiency per unit of GDP while encouraging forest cover in the region.

=== November ===
- The COSCO Busan oil spill occurred between San Francisco and Oakland, California in the United States.
- The hoax Journal for Geoclimatic Studies published a fabricated global warming study entitled, "Carbon dioxide production by benthic bacteria: the death of manmade global warming theory?"
- Business leaders of 150 global companies published the Bali Communiqué to world leaders calling for a comprehensive, legally binding United Nations framework to tackle climate change.
- The P8 Group meet for their first P8 summit. It brings together senior leaders from some of the world's largest public pension funds to develop actions relating to global issues and particularly climate change.

=== December ===
- The 2007 United Nations Climate Change Conference took place in Bali, Indonesia, between December 3 and December 15, 2007
- The participating nations at the 2007 United Nations Climate Change Conference adopted the Bali Road Map as a two-year process to finalizing a binding agreement in 2009 in Copenhagen.
- The MT Hebei Spirit oil spill occurred in South Korea.

== See also ==
- Human impact on the environment
- List of years in the environment
