= Howard government =

Australian government from 1996 to 2007

Howard government

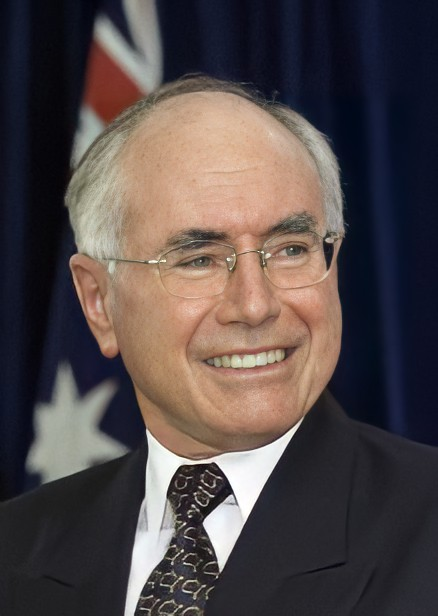

In office
- 11 March 1996 – 3 December 2007
- Monarch: Elizabeth II
- Prime Minister: John Howard
- Deputy: Tim Fischer (1996–1999); John Anderson (1999–2005); Mark Vaile (2005–2007)
- Parties: Liberal; National
- Status: Majority
- Origin: Won 1996 election
- Demise: Lost 2007 election
- Predecessor: Keating government
- Successor: Rudd government (I)

The Howard government was the federal executive government of Australia led by Prime Minister John Howard between 11 March 1996 and 3 December 2007. It was made up of members of the Liberal–National Coalition, which won a majority of seats in the House of Representatives at four successive elections. The Howard government commenced following victory over the Keating government at the 1996 federal election. It concluded with its defeat at the 2007 federal election by the Australian Labor Party, whose leader Kevin Rudd then formed the first Rudd government. It was the second-longest government under a single prime minister, with the longest having been the second Menzies government (1949–1966).

Two senior ministers served in single roles for the duration of the government; Peter Costello as Treasurer and Alexander Downer as Minister for Foreign Affairs. The leader of the National Party served as Deputy Prime Minister. Three men served in this capacity during the Howard government: Tim Fischer until July 1999, followed by John Anderson until July 2005 and then Mark Vaile. Decisions of the Executive were made either by the Cabinet or by the appropriate Minister.

For the first three terms of government, and part of the fourth term, the Howard government did not have control of the Senate. Legislation needed the support of the Opposition or minor parties for that legislation to be passed and become law. In the 2004 election, the Coalition won control of the Senate for all but the first nine months of its fourth term, and was able to pass legislation without the support of minor parties. The government also faced internal problems and tension, with the loss of numerous ministers during its first term due to the introduction of a ministerial code of conduct and ongoing leadership rivalry between John Howard and Peter Costello.

Significant issues for the Howard government included implementation of substantial spending cuts in its first term of office and completely paying off government debt; gun control; the popularity of Pauline Hanson and her One Nation party; industrial relations reforms, including the 1998 waterfront dispute and the introduction of WorkChoices; the 1999 Australian republic referendum; reconciliation and native title; the introduction of a goods and services tax; the 1999 Australian-led intervention in East Timor; blocking boats of refugees from seeking asylum in Australia; the "war on terror"; the intervention in Northern Territory Indigenous communities; and an economy that experienced sustained growth throughout the government's term of office.

== Background ==
John Howard became Leader of the Opposition on 30 January 1995, replacing Alexander Downer, who resigned in his favour. Downer took the position of Shadow Minister for Foreign Affairs, and Peter Costello retained his position as Deputy Leader of the Liberal Party and Shadow Treasurer.

Howard had had a long Parliamentary career, having entered Parliament in 1974 and serving as Treasurer in the Fraser government from 1977 to 1983. He replaced Andrew Peacock as leader of the Opposition in 1985 and challenged the Hawke government at the 1987 election, which saw Labor returned. Peacock successfully challenged and replaced Howard prior to the 1990 election, which again returned Labor. The Liberals turned to two further leaders (John Hewson and Alexander Downer) before restoring Howard to the office to lead the Coalition against the Keating Labor government. Long-serving Labor Treasurer Paul Keating had successfully challenged Bob Hawke for the leadership of the Labor Party and the prime ministership in 1991. Despite Australia suffering a deep recession in the early 1990s, Labor had increased its lead over the Coalition at the 1993 election, which had seen the Liberals under Hewson offer an ambitious program of economic reform called Fightback!, which proposed a Goods and Services Tax as its centrepiece.

As opposition leader, Howard delivered a series of "headland speeches", which dealt broadly with the philosophy of government. In contrast to Keating, he used these addresses to speak in favour of traditional Australian institutions and symbols like the Australian flag and ANZAC legacy. By the time of the 1996 Election, unemployment was high, but at a lower rate than at the previous 1993 Election, and interest rates were lower than they had been in 1990, but foreign debt had been growing. The Keating government was projecting a small budget surplus. Following the election, an $8 billion deficit was confirmed.

Delivering his Policy Launch Speech at the Ryde Civic Centre in Sydney on 18 February 1996, Howard emphasised that Labor had been in office a long time, and cited high inflation, a poor current account deficit and high national debt as evidence of bad economic management. He called for industrial relations reform to increase flexibility and improve productivity and offered tax relief for families. He proposed increased spending on environmental challenges, to be in part funded by the partial sale of Telstra. He also promised to restore the prime minister's attendance at question time in parliament (which Keating had reduced in his final term).

The 1996 Election brought to an end 13 years of the Hawke-Keating Labor government.

== First term: 1996–1998 ==
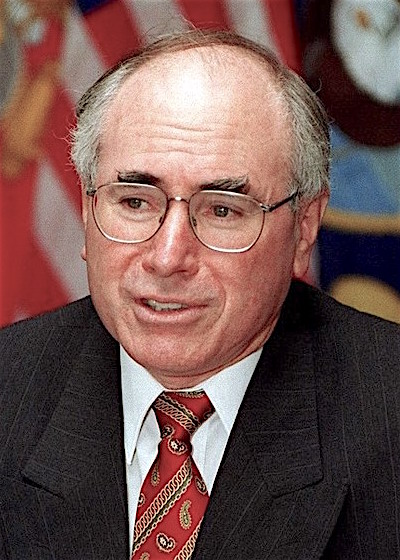
Howard during a visit to the United States in 1997

=== Election win ===
The Liberal-National Coalition won the federal election on 2 March 1996 against the incumbent Keating Labor government. The coalition had a 45-seat majority in the House of Representatives. Howard announced his proposed ministry team on 8 March 1996, with the Governor-General swearing them into office on 11 March. The size of the Coalition victory gave John Howard great power within the Liberal party and he said he came to the office "with very clear views on where I wanted to take the country". In the first week of the new government, Howard sacked six department heads and chose new department heads himself and changes were made across the public service.

=== Port Arthur massacre and gun control ===
On 28 April 1996, eight weeks into the new government's term, 35 people were shot dead by a lone gunman in Port Arthur, Tasmania. John Howard led a push to significantly increase restrictions on gun ownership, which divided the cabinet and inflamed some rural voters who were an important part of the Coalition's core constituency. The new National Firearms Program Implementation Act 1996 restricted the ownership of semi-automatic rifles, semi-automatic shotguns, pump-action shotguns, and introduced uniform firearms licensing. It was implemented with bipartisan support by the Commonwealth, States and Territories.

=== Government spending cuts ===
The government stated that the previous Keating government had left them with an unexpected $7.6 billion "black hole" budget deficit. The new treasurer, Peter Costello, and Finance Minister, John Fahey worked at reducing Commonwealth expenditure. This involved reneging on a number of election commitments, which Howard defended as "non-core promises". At the first Coalition government budget, the public service was "downsized", the Commonwealth Employment Service (CES) was privatised, and cuts were made to all departments with the exception of defence. $8 billion in spending cuts were made over the government's first two budgets.

=== Industrial relations and waterfront dispute ===
April 1998 ABC news report on the Waterfront Dispute.

Industrial relations reform had been a key issue canvassed by John Howard in the 1996 election campaign. On 1 January 1997, the majority of the provisions of the Workplace Relations Act 1996 came into effect. The Act substantially amended the Industrial Relations Act 1988 and, under the legislation, the jurisdiction of the Industrial Relations Court of Australia, established by the Keating government in 1994, was transferred to the Federal Court of Australia. Elements of the reforms were opposed by the Labor Party and Union movement. The Australian Council of Trade Unions called the "cavalcade to Canberra" rally to protest against the industrial relations reform agenda. The protest began with senior Australian Trade Union officials including ACTU President Jennie George and Assistant Secretary Greg Combet, as well as senior members of the Australian Labor Party rallying demonstrators from a podium. The initially peaceful protest deteriorated into the 1996 Parliament House riot which saw a breakaway group of protesters attack the entrance to Parliament.

The Howard government made waterfront reform a key feature of the 'first wave' of its industrial relations agenda. Their goal was to lift exports and hence improve the economy, but also sought to use it as a symbolic issue to decrease trade union influence. Initially, new workplace legislation was introduced in December 1996—following a deal with Democrats Leader Cheryl Kernot—to include a no-disadvantage test, increase employer's power to deal directly with workers, limit strike action, ban secondary boycotts, ban compulsory unionism, and introduce Australian Workplace Agreements (AWAs). Large fines were imposed on unions involved in illegal strike activity.

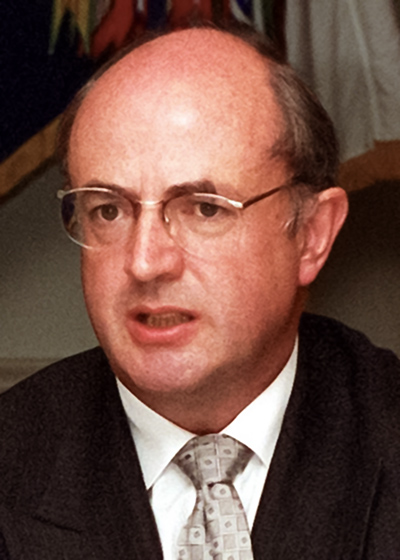
Peter Reith in 2001

An "Interventionist Strategy" was devised in March 1997 between Industrial Relations Minister, Peter Reith, Transport Minister John Sharp, and Patrick Corporation managing director Chris Corrigan whereby Patrick's would replace the existing current unionised labour with non-unionised labour using the government's new industrial relations legislation. The government agreed to the company's request to fund redundancy payments later announced to be $150 million. The company secretly trained an alternate workforce in Dubai. In December 1997, the plan became public (Peter Reith denied knowledge of the plan) and the union movement was able to stop the Dubai training; the training was finished in Australia with the assistance of the National Farmers' Federation. At 11 pm 7 April 1998, Corrigan, with the assistance of security guards with dogs, sacked the union workforce of 1,400 across the country, and replaced it with the alternate non-union labour. John Howard described the action as "a fightback by the people of Australia against the inefficiency of the wharves."

Over the following months, a bitter and sometimes violent dispute took place at port locations. The Maritime Union of Australia (MUA) took the case to the Federal Court and after an appeals process, and an interim injunction instructing the company to reinstate the 1,400 workers, the High Court ultimately found in favour of the MUA. The MUA and Patricks reached a new workplace and productivity agreement, which was adopted in June 1998, that included halving the permanent workforce, casualisation and contracting, the MUA retaining the right to represent maritime workers, and changing work practices to what the company originally sought.

=== Legislation ===
The government did not have a majority in the Senate, and thus had to negotiate legislation through the Senate with either the Australian Democrats or the independents. The Senate modified government legislation, including the partial privatisation of the government-owned telecommunications company, Telstra; increases in university fees; large funding cuts in the 1996 and 1997 budgets; a 30% private health insurance rebate; and the Wik 10 Point Plan, giving extinguishment of native title on pastoral leases.

During this first term, only two pieces of legislation were rejected outright by the Senate, being the Workplace Relationships Amendment Bill 1997 and the Telstra (Transition to Full Private Ownership) Bill 1998. A "work for the dole" system was introduced that required able-bodied social security recipients to participate in activities aimed at improving their social and work skills.

=== Ministerial code of conduct ===
The coalition campaigned on a policy of "clean government" as a contrast to the previous government. A "Code of Ministerial Conduct" was introduced in fulfilment of this pledge. The code required ministers to divest shares in portfolios that they oversaw and to be truthful in parliament. The code eventually led to seven cabinet ministers resigning following breach of the code. Jim Short and Brian Gibson both resigned in October 1996 as both held shares in companies that were within their ministerial portfolios. Bob Woods resigned in February 1997 over questionable ministerial expense claims. Geoff Prosser resigned in July 1997 following the disclosure that he was a shopping centre landlord whilst he was responsible for commercial tenancy provisions of the Trade Practices Act 1974. John Sharp, David Jull and Peter McGauran resigned in September 1997 over irregularities in the use of ministerial travel allowances in what became known in the media as the "Travel Rorts Affair". John Moore and Warwick Parer survived revelations about his shareholdings. Parer however was not reappointed to the Second Howard Ministry. In early 1999, the government announced that ministers would no longer be required to divest themselves of shareholdings.

=== Indigenous affairs, Wik and Native Title ===
On 23 December 1996, the High Court recognised the Wik people's native titles rights, and that pastoral and mining leases would not extinguish native title as had been assumed after the 1992 Mabo decision and subsequent Native Title Act 1993. Rather, the High Court decision determined that Native Title could co-exist with pastoral leases, which caused farmers to fear they would lose their land. The government announced a "Ten Point Plan" to deal with the uncertainty that had the effect of weakening the Native Title Act. The legislation termed the "Native Title Amendment Act 1998" was introduced into Parliament in September 1997, but was opposed by the Labor party in the Senate. A deal announced on 3 July 1998 between Independent Senator Brian Harradine and the prime minister saw the legislation pass the Senate. The legislation meant that 120 agreements and permits in doubt due to the "Wik decision" were now valid.

On 26 May 1997, John Howard tabled the Human Rights and Equal Opportunity Commission's Bringing Them Home Report, a report commissioned by the Keating government in relation to the separation of Aboriginal and Torres Strait Islander children from their families. The government adopted most of the recommendations of the report, though pointedly did not agree that a national "apology" from the Parliament would be an appropriate response.

Despite Howard's criticism of the 1995 decision by the Keating government, making the Australian Aboriginal flag and the Torres Strait Islander flag official flags of Australia under the Flags Act 1953. The Howard government never repealed the decision.

=== Constitutional Convention ===
A Constitutional Convention was called by the Howard government in February 1998 to consider the question of Australia becoming a republic and consider other alterations to the Australian Constitution which might be appropriate for the coming centenary of the Federation of Australia in 2001. The convention had been promised in Opposition by Alexander Downer in response to the republican proposals of the Keating government. Consisting of 152 delegates, the Convention comprised both appointed and elected delegates. Appointees included 40 national parliamentarians and elected delegates included representatives of the Australian Republican Movement and Australians for Constitutional Monarchy.

At the convention, Liberal-National delegates were permitted to advocate freely whether for or against change. Prime Minister Howard and Deputy Prime Minister Tim Fischer spoke in favour of the status quo in relation to the republic, while Treasurer Peter Costello supported change. The Labor opposition also advocated for change to a republic.

Howard outlined his support for retaining the status quo on the basis that it had provided a long period of stability and whilst he said there was no question that Australia was a fully independent nation, he believed that the "separation of the ceremonial and executive functions of government" and the presence of a neutral "defender of constitutional integrity" was an advantage in government and that no republican model would be as effective in providing such an outcome as the Australian constitutional monarchy. Tim Fischer said that the Australian Constitution had delivered one of the "oldest continuous federated democracies in the world" and that changing it would be a complex operation: "The case for changing our mighty Constitution which has helped modernise Australia remains distant, divided and ill-defined. I say: stay with a system that works and works well". Peter Costello also rejected any suggestion that Australia was not already an independent nation, but said that, while the Australian Constitution works "remarkably well", it was the institution of monarchy that was the crux of his argument for change: " The temper of the times is democratic; we are uncomfortable with an office that appoints people by hereditary. In our society in our time we prefer appointment by merit".

The Convention reached "in principle" support for an Australian republic and examined three models for change. After a voting process, the Convention proposed that a Bi-partisan appointment republican model to be put to a referendum of the Australian nation in 1999.

The Convention recommended that state parliaments also examine the issue of the republic, as each State has separate and individual constitutional links to the monarchy. Certain recommendations were made for a new Constitutional preamble which included introductory language along the lines of "we the Australian people", and referencing "Almighty God", custodianship and occupancy of Australia by Indigenous Australians, as well as affirmations of the law, cultural diversity, unique land and environment and democratic political system of Australia.

=== 457 visa ===
The 457 visa was the Temporary Business (Long Stay) and was introduced soon after John Howard became prime minister in 1996.

=== Work for the Dole ===
Work for the Dole was first proposed by the Liberal Party of Australia in 1987, and was enacted on a trial basis a year after it gained power at the 1996 federal election in their traditional coalition. Despite mixed feelings among younger people, at whom the program was aimed, there was little mainstream opposition when it was launched.

On 1 July 1998, all job seekers aged 18–24 that had been claiming benefits for six months or more were required to join the scheme. From 19 April 1999, job seekers aged 17 or 18 and who had left Year 12 had to join the scheme after three months of job seeking. During the 2000 Summer Olympic Games, all those of an eligible age who had been unemployed for three months or more and lived in Sydney were required to participate. This temporary change was made to encourage people to take up casual work during the Games. In December 2000, Work for the Dole was expanded to include those aged 35–39. Additionally, those aged 40–49 could volunteer themselves for the scheme for the first time.

=== Taxation and the GST ===
A broad-based goods and services tax (GST) had previously been proposed by both the Labor Party and the Coalition as a means of reducing the reliance of the Commonwealth on income tax, by increasing the tax on consumption. The existing wholesale sales tax only applied to certain products, while the mooted GST would apply to all products and services equally. In 1981 Treasurer John Howard proposed an indirect consumption tax to Cabinet, a mid-1980s proposal advocated by then treasurer Paul Keating was stopped within the Labor Party, and the Coalition's loss of the "unlosable" 1993 federal election was widely attributed to their GST proposal. In reference to his long-held support for a GST, John Howard said in the lead up to the 1996 election that a GST would "never ever" be Coalition policy, which was repeated in August 1996 once in government.

In May 1997, the Prime Minister shocked his party and created headlines when he unilaterally indicated a GST might be proposed as part of broader changes to the tax system. In August of that year, the Prime Minister announced that the government would contest the next election offering a GST with extensive compensatory cuts in income and sales taxes. A long-held conviction of Howard's, the tax reform proposal was credited with boosting his confidence and direction, which had appeared to wane early in the government's second year. The Treasurer was charged with forming and running a special confidential working group to devise the details of the plan over the following 12 months.

The Coalition Tax Reform Package was launched on 13 August 1998 and included a 10 percent GST with the proceeds to be distributed to the states. Income tax would be lowered and the wholesale sales tax abolished, along with certain taxes on financial transactions. Over that fortnight, the proposal received a generally positive response and on 30 August the Prime Minister announced an early election for 3 October 1998. The GST, however, proved to be a difficult sell during the election campaign which was considered a "referendum on the GST".

=== Foreign affairs ===
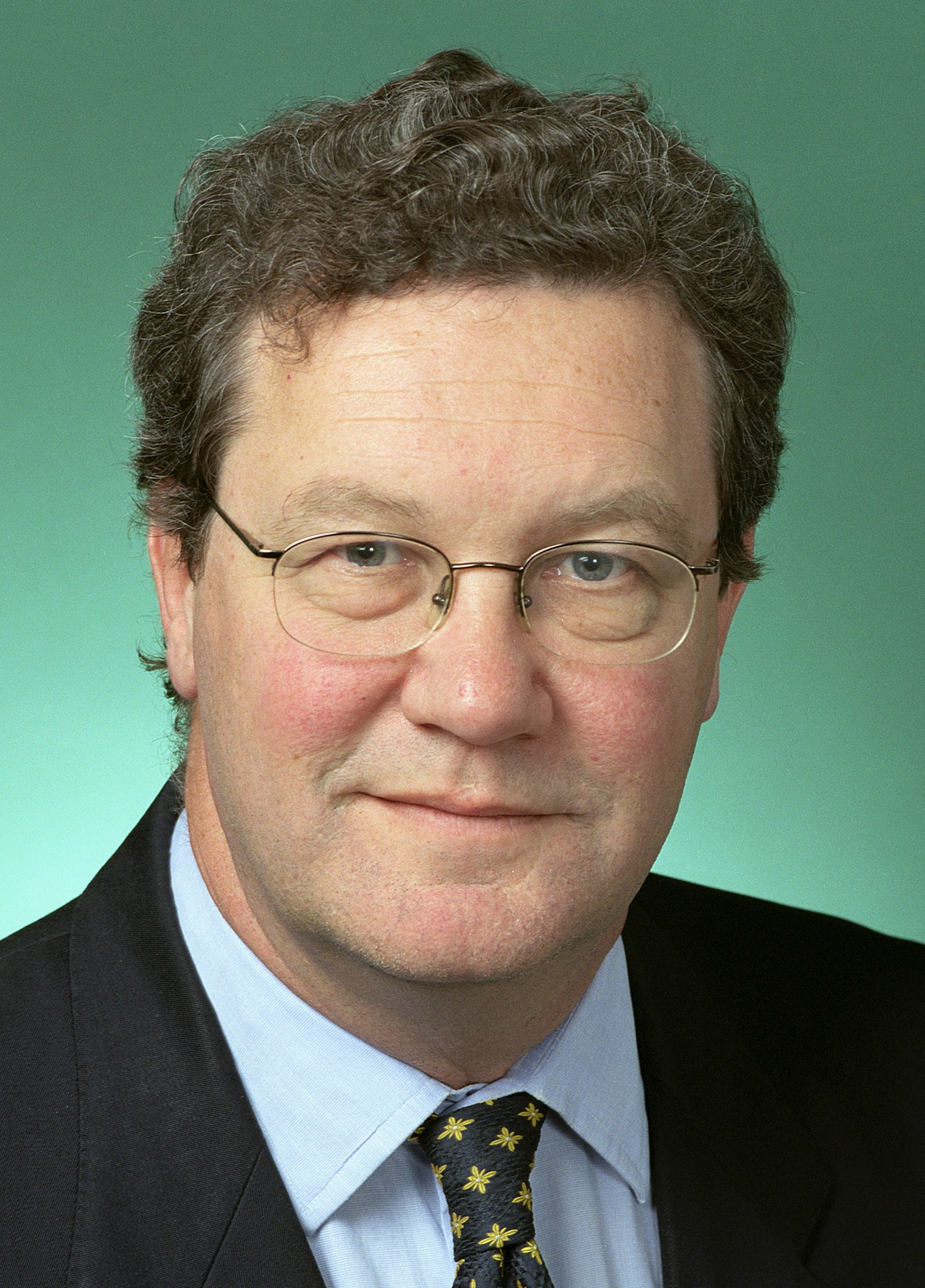
Alexander Downer served as Foreign Minister for the duration of the Howard government.

Alexander Downer assumed the office of Minister for Foreign Affairs in the first term of the Howard government and remained in the post until 2007. Howard and Downer sought to shift the emphasis of the Keating government's narrative on Australian foreign policy. In his 2010 biography Lazarus Rising, Howard wrote that he saw Keating's narrative as implying Australia had in some way to "show an overt preference for links with Asia over our ties with traditional allies such as the United States and Britain, especially the latter", whereas in Howard's view, Australia "did not have to choose between her history and her geography". Howard summarised this policy emphasis as "Asia first, not Asia only".

Soon after taking office, Howard met with Malaysian Prime Minister Mahatir, to smooth relations in the aftermath of former Prime Minister Keating's falling out with Mahatir. Relations subsequently deteriorated between the Mahatir and Howard governments, when Howard criticised Mahatir's treatment of Mahatir's former Deputy Anwar Ibrahim and when Mahatir became a trenchant critic of Australian military operations in East Timor and later Iraq.

Howard selected Indonesia and Japan for his first foreign visits and went to China in early 1997 at the invitation of President Jiang Zemin. Howard then visited the United States to meet with US President Bill Clinton and on to Britain to meet with UK Prime Minister Tony Blair in July of that year. Australia-Indonesia relations were on the cusp of a volatile period, with the approaching collapse of the Suharto government and independence for East Timor. During the course of the Howard government, trade with China was to grow exponentially, and Howard was to cultivate close working relationships with Clinton's replacement, George W. Bush of the United States and UK Prime Minister Tony Blair.

The emergence of the 1997 Asian financial crisis shifted regional dynamics, and contributed to the demise of the Suharto administration and Indonesia's transition to democracy, through which the Howard government negotiated bilateral relations. In one of the Howard government's most significant foreign policy initiatives, Australia contributed assistance to the region as part of an international bail-out. The Australian economy avoided the downturn and, along with Japan, offered supplementary help to that of the International Monetary Fund to other nations in the region – notably Thailand, Korea and Indonesia – and lobbied The IMF and USA to ease demands placed on Indonesia.

== Second term: 1998–2001 ==
=== 1998 election ===
Through much of its first term, opinion polling had been disappointing for the government; at times many in the government feared being a "one-term wonder". The popularity of Pauline Hanson and her One Nation party and the new restrictions on gun ownership drew many traditionally Coalition voters away from the Howard government. Also controversial had been the large spending cuts, the waterfront dispute and industrial changes, and the government's commitment to a GST.

On 20 September 1998, at the Riverside Theatre in Parramatta, Howard delivered a conspicuously "no frills" policy launch in which he said that "economic competence" should be the major issue of the election, at a time of economic uncertainty following the Asian Financial Crisis, in which regional economies had fallen into recession, while Australia stood out as the economic "strong man of Asia":

Labor left us, despite all the protestations of Mr Beazley and Mr Keating, a deficit of $10.5 billion and we turned that into a surplus a year ahead of schedule.

Howard credited his government with having reduced debt and unemployment and outlined his case for the introduction of a Goods and Services Tax, describing the existing taxation system as "broken", and saying that the Coalition's tax reform proposals would introduce a new economy wide tax to be dedicated to the funding of the States, while at the same time reducing or eliminating a range of inefficient existing taxes:

And it is only through having a goods and services tax as part of our plan that we can actually guarantee the levels of government services and the levels of welfare support that all decent minded Australians believe should be available in a modern, civilised and compassionate Australian community.

The Kim Beazley-led Labor opposition opposed the GST outright.

On 3 October 1998, the Howard government won a second term with its March 1996 majority of 45 seats reduced to 12. Exit polls had predicted a government loss. A 4.6 percent swing away from the government translated into a two-party preferred vote of 49.02 per cent for the government to Labor's 50.98 per cent. Despite One Nation winning almost 1 million votes and its 8.4 percent first preference vote being larger than the National Party's, Pauline Hanson did not win her run for the House of Representatives seat of Blair. On election night, John Howard claimed the win as a mandate for the GST, and in surprising and apparently impromptu remarks, he committed the government to reconciliation with Australia's indigenous peoples.

Simultaneously with the federal election, a referendum on statehood was held in the Northern Territory, with the Howard government promising to grant statehood if it passed. The "No" vote won with 51.9 percent of the vote, a margin of just over 3,500 votes.

The Howard government's second term saw Australia reject proposals for a republic and successfully host the Sydney 2000 Olympics. In 2001, the nation also celebrated a century of Federation, with ceremonies in both Australia and Britain. But the period was also marked by dramatic international security crises, including the East Timorese independence referendum and 11 September Terror Attacks on the United States.

=== 1999 republic referendum ===
The 1999 Australian republic referendum was a two question referendum held in 1999. The first question asked whether Australia should become a republic with a President appointed by Parliament, a model that had previously been decided at a Constitutional Convention in February 1998. The second question, generally deemed to be far less important politically, asked whether Australia should alter the constitution to insert a new preamble. The preamble was notable for its reference to Aboriginal custodianship of Australia. Neither of the amendments passed, with 55% of all electors and all states voting 'no' to the proposed amendment.

The referendum was held on 6 November 1999, after a national advertising campaign and the distribution of 12.9 million Yes/No case pamphlets. The question on a republic was defeated. It was not carried in any state and attracted 45 per cent of the total national vote. The preamble referendum question was also defeated, with a Yes vote of only 39 per cent.

Many opinions were put forward for the defeat, some relating to perceived difficulties with the Parliamentary Appointment model, others relating to the lack of public engagement. Many republicans voted no because they did not agree with provisions such as the President being instantly dismissible by the Prime Minister.

=== Implementing the GST ===
In the month following the election, the government moved to implement its tax changes, and sought the support of Tasmanian independent senator, Brian Harradine. The senator, however, announced on 14 May 1999, that he objected in principle to the GST and would not support the bill. The sole remaining opportunity for the government to pass the legislation through the Senate was to obtain the support of the Australian Democrats through their leader Meg Lees. Following intense and controversial negotiations, a deal was reached on 28 May whereby the concessions given to the Democrats included an exemption on basic food, more generous compensation to pensioners, and a reduction in tax cuts to higher income earners. The GST came into effect on 1 July 2000, the lead-up to which was marked by public concerns and confusion, interest group lobbying for exemptions, and the Opposition campaigning against it. The GST led to a single quarter of negative economic growth and a spike in the consumer price index, effects which proved to be transient. The implementation of the new tax system was not without problems and voter dissatisfaction with the GST increased; Labor stepped up a campaign against it, promising a partial rollback should it win office. Dissatisfaction of a majority of the Democrats membership led to a leadership contest in which Meg Lees was deposed by Natasha Stott Despoja.

=== Immigration ===
The Howard government during its term from 1996 to 2007 increased immigration.

Period	Migration programme
1998–1999	68 000
1999–2000	70 000
2000–2001	76 000
2001–2002	85 000
2002–2003	108,070
2003–2004	114,360
2004–2005	120,060
2005	142,933
2006	148,200
2007	158,630

=== East Timor ===
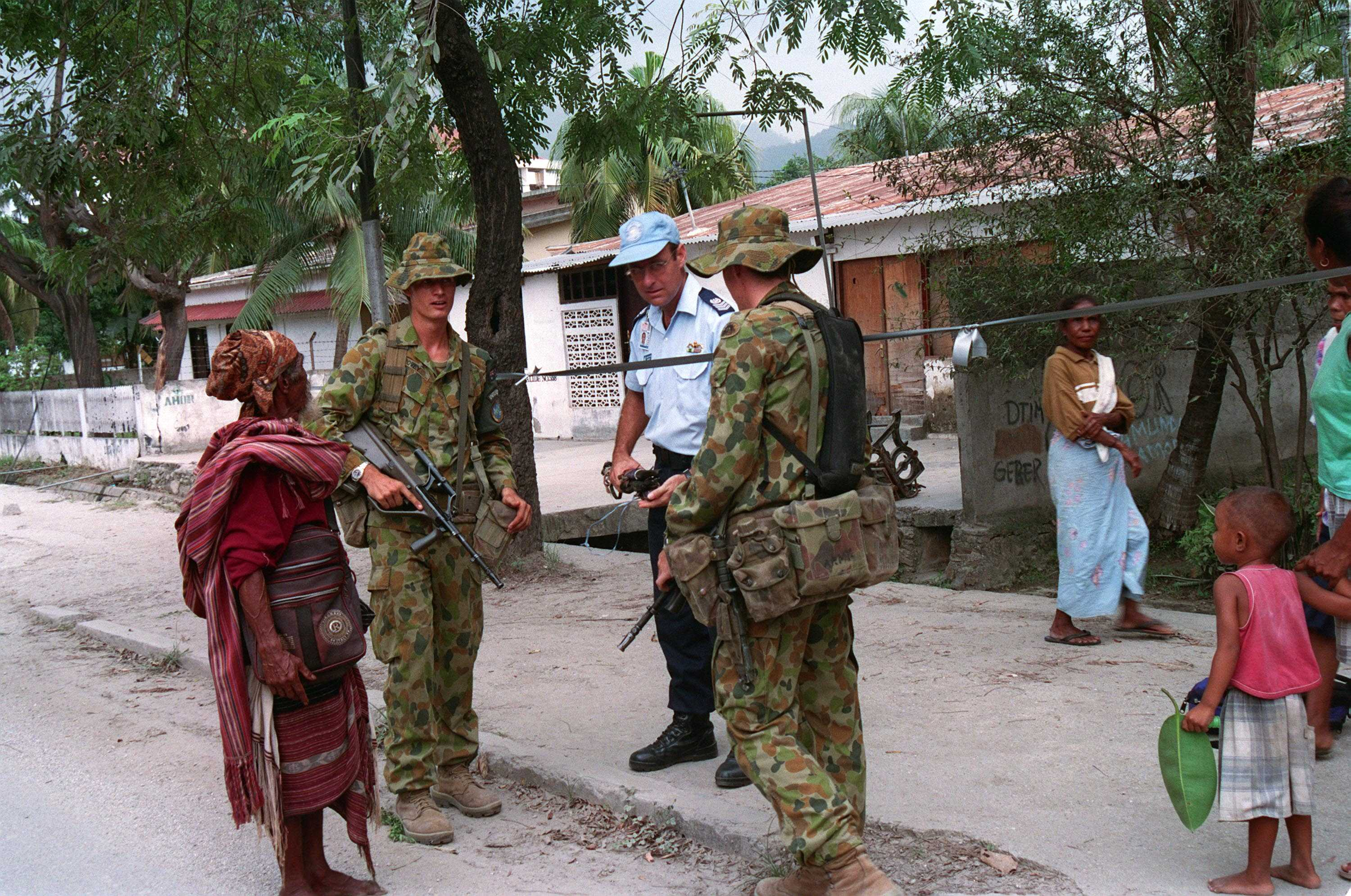
Australian peacekeepers and East Timorese civilians in Dili during 2000

Australia was one of the few countries to recognise the 1976 annexation of East Timor by President Suharto's "New Order" government. The 1998 resignation of Suharto and replacement by his reformist protégé, B.J. Habibie, created an opportunity in both countries for policy reform. Habibie was suggesting East Timor receive special autonomy status within the Indonesian republic, which he offered as part of United Nations (UN)-mediated negotiation process between Indonesia and the territory's former colonial ruler, Portugal. Australian policy also changed. From a position of not supporting any act of East Timorese self-determination, the Prime Minister and Foreign Minister Downer formulated a shift in policy to suggesting not just autonomy but a political solution that included a referendum on independence be provided in about a decade. This was developed confidentially without the knowledge of Cabinet, and outlined in a December 1998 letter to Habibie suggesting the Indonesian government prepare for such a referendum.

Reacting to the Howard-Downer letter in January 1999, Habibie announced a snap decision for East Timor to have a UN-supervised referendum within 6 months rather than the 10 years suggested by Howard. The Habibie announcement provoked violence from East Timorese pro-integration militia groups, violence that the Indonesian military (TNI) could not or would not control. The Prime Minister's request for President Habibie to permit a UN peace-keeping force to take control was rejected by President Habibie as unacceptable and inflammatory to the Indonesian domestic political environment.

On 30 August 1999, the East Timorese voted overwhelmingly for independence. Within a few days, the pro-integration militia—along with their TNI supporters—undertook a retaliatory scorched earth campaign that left over 1,000 people dead and destroyed much of the territory's infrastructure. In the face of Australian public and international outrage, the Prime Minister led discussions for a UN peacekeeping force, a position supported by US President Bill Clinton and UN Secretary-General Kofi Annan. Following international pressure, President Habibie allowed the peacekeeping force (Interfet) to enter Indonesia, with Australia providing the largest contingent of 4,500 troops. Landing in Dili on 20 September 1999, the mission was popular within Australia and maintained bipartisan political support. In early October, the UN Secretary-General announced that INTERFET had largely restored order to East Timor.

=== Reconciliation ===
As recommended in the 1997 Bringing Them Home report, the government considered the issue of a national apology to Indigenous Australians, in recognition of the treatment by previous governments since the European settlement of the country. However, in the face of a growing movement in favour of a formal national apology (the first National Sorry Day taking place on 26 May 1998), Howard remained strongly against it, saying he didn't believe that the current generation should accept responsibility for the actions of previous generations. Instead, on 26 August 1999 John Howard introduced a "Motion of Reconciliation" and repeated his personal expression of "deep and sincere regret" for past injustices.

At Corroboree 2000, a Reconciliation convention in May 2000 in preparation for a reconciliation ceremony to be held at the centenary of Australian Federation, the government opposed the wording of a proposed "Australian Declaration towards Reconciliation". Consequently, agreement was not reached with the Council for Aboriginal Reconciliation, with the government preferring reference be made to "practical reconciliation" that focuses on health, education, housing and employment, rather than the more symbolic proposal for an apology, to be expressed as part of "walk[ing] the journey of healing". Only two members of the Cabinet, Philip Ruddock and John Herron, ministers for reconciliation and Aboriginal affairs respectively, reportedly at the instruction of John Howard, joined the 250,000 people who walked across the Sydney Harbour Bridge as part of the Peoples Walk for Reconciliation.

=== Leadership tensions and slump in popularity ===
Howard's reported instruction to his Cabinet to not join the Reconciliation Walk highlighted tensions between him and Treasurer Costello, who was amongst those Cabinet Ministers who had wanted to walk. In a 2000 radio interview on his 61st birthday, Howard suggested that if the Party still wanted him to contest the next election he would consider retirement when he was 64. This was interpreted as boosting Costello's leadership aspirations, and the enmity over leadership and succession resurfaced publicly when Howard did not retire at the age of 64. In May 2001, an internal Liberal Party memo written by Shane Stone, the Federal President of the Liberal Party, was leaked to the media. The memo, particularly critical of Peter Costello and warning that the government was perceived as " a mean government", "not listening" and "out of touch", was highly embarrassing for the government's top leadership group and flared tensions between Howard and Costello.

In the first half of 2001, the government suffered a number of setbacks including rising petrol prices, voter enmity over the implementation of the GST and its new administrative obligations on business, a spike in inflation and a sharp slowdown in the economy. The Coalition lost office in both the West Australian and Queensland state elections in February, while defeat in the Ryan by-election and bad opinion polls led to predictions of the Howard government losing office in the election expected late that year.

In response, the government announced a series of reversals and softening of policy: fuel excise was decreased by 1.5 c/litre and indexation of excise was removed with John Howard saying the government was "not going to be sacrificed on the pyre of ideological purity". Contrary to their previous record on encouraging foreign investment, the government announced intention to block Royal Dutch Shell's $10 billion takeover of Woodside Petroleum. It was generally a popular decision within the electorate but one that critics said was pandering to "Hansonite" economic nationalism. By June, government spending on media promotion and advertising of government programs was $20 million a month. The subsequent federal budget had a lower than expected surplus of $1.5 billion, and contained significant benefits and tax cuts for older Australians, a demographic whose support the government keenly sought. News that the economy had avoided recession also boosted the government. In July, the Liberal Party held on to the seat of Aston in a by-election, prompting Howard to say that the Coalition was "back in the game".

=== Asylum seekers ===
ABC news report of the Tampa affair and its political context, October 2001.

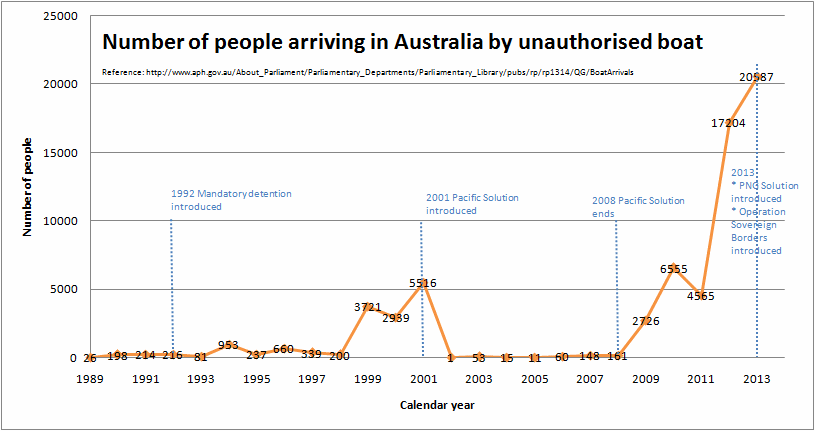
Persons arriving by unauthorised boat to Australia by calendar year

From 1999 to mid-2001, approximately 8,000 asylum seekers had landed on Australian shores. The government instructed the Australian Navy to turn boats back, which it said would stop more asylum seekers making the journey. The program dubbed "Operation Relex" begins on 3 September. In August 2001, the government refused permission for the Norwegian freighter MV Tampa, carrying a group of asylum seekers picked up in international waters, to enter Australian waters (see Tampa affair). When the Tampa entered Australian waters, the Prime Minister ordered the ship be boarded by Australian special forces. This brought censure from the government of Norway who said the Australian Government failed to meet obligations to distressed mariners under international law at the United Nations. Within a few days the government introduces the Border Protection Bill into the House of Representatives saying it will confirm Australian sovereignty to "determine who will enter and reside in Australia". The Opposition opposed the bill defeating it in the Senate, and John Howard accused Labor leader Kim Beazley of standing for nothing and said "He has no ticker". Two weeks later, the opposition supported an amended version of the Bill The government brokered a deal, dubbed "The Pacific Solution", with the Government of Nauru whereby the asylum seekers were taken to Nauru where their refugee status was considered, rather than in Australia.

On 7 October 2001, a Suspected Illegal Entry Vessel (SIEV) containing 223 refugees was intercepted by an Australian warship as part of "Operation Relex". The Department of Defence informed the government that children had been thrown overboard. The government said that the refugees threw their children in the water and sank the boat in an attempt to force the Australian sailors to grant them asylum. John Howard said "we're not a nation that‟s going to be intimidated by this kind of behaviour." Three days later doubt was cast over whether photos offered as evidence by Defence Minister Peter Reith actually proved that children had been thrown overboard. Evidence later presented suggested that the government had exaggerated or fabricated these claims.

These asylum restriction incidents resounded with the Australian electorate; many commentators cite the August 2001 Tampa controversy as the decisive issue in Howard's 2001 election victory. The government pointed out that by that November the boat arrivals had stopped. The government's position on asylum seekers was criticised by Liberal members Petro Georgiou and Bruce Baird, questioning the extent of the problem and the ethics of the government's response.

In 2003, economist Ross Gittins, a columnist at Fairfax Media, said former Prime Minister John Howard had been "a tricky chap " on immigration, by appearing "tough" on illegal immigration to win support from the working class, while simultaneously winning support from employers with high legal immigration.

=== International affairs ===
In 1999, a diplomatic crisis emerged for Australia in the disintegrating nation of Yugoslavia. Former prime minister Malcolm Fraser was dispatched as a special envoy by the Australian Government to seek release of CARE Australia workers Steve Pratt and Peter Wallace imprisoned in Yugoslavia on charges of espionage.

==== 11 September 2001 ("9/11") attacks ====
Howard and George W. Bush on 10 September 2001. Howard was in Washington, D.C. during the 11 September terrorist attacks, the response to which occupied much of his third term in office

In the 1990s, a wealthy Saudi dissident, Osama bin Laden, leader of Al Qaeda (an internationalist Islamist paramilitary headquartered in Afghanistan) declared a fatwa calling for the killing of "Americans and their allies – civilians and military... in any country in which it is possible to do it" to bring to an end the ongoing enforcement of the blockade against Iraq and presence of US troops in the Arabian Peninsula. The declaration followed earlier bombings and declarations of Jihad, which had brought Australians into the line of fire in what would latterly grow to be called the "war on terror". In September 2001, John Howard went to Washington to meet the new president of the United States, George W. Bush and to commemorate the anniversary of the ANZUS alliance. During Howard's visit, on 11 September 2001, four passenger planes were hijacked by Al Qaeda and used as missiles to attack civilian and military targets in New York (World Trade Center) and suburban Washington, D.C. (the Pentagon). The attacks surpassed the Japanese bombing of Pearl Harbor as the most deadly attack against United States territory of modern times. In response, the Howard government invoked the ANZUS Treaty and offered support to the United States. The Howard government subsequently committed troops to the Afghanistan War (with bi-partisan support) and the Iraq War (meeting with the disapproval of other political parties). The international Al Qaeda threat became a major backdrop to the 2001 Australian federal election and became among the most significant foreign policy challenges of the Howard government's terms of office. By the time of Bin Laden's death a decade later at the hands of US Special Forces, 105 Australians had been killed in Al Qaeda attacks in New York, Bali, London and Mumbai and a further 24 Australian military personnel had been killed while serving in the Afghanistan conflict (including one with the British Armed Forces).

In Australian magazine The Bulletin, it was suggested that the Prime Minister viewed Australia as a "deputy peacekeeping capacity to the global policing role of the US" in the Asia-Pacific region, and that he had embraced the term "Howard Doctrine". Both notions were criticised by foreign leaders, diplomats, and academics in Australia and the region. Howard rejected these notions later that week. In 2003, US president, George W Bush, described Howard as the US' "deputy sheriff" in the region, comments which Howard played down.

=== 2001 election ===
On 5 October 2001, John Howard announced a federal election to be held on 10 November. From the poor opinion polling in early 2001 that suggested electoral defeat, the government recovered to win the 2001 election, recording one of the biggest electoral swings to an incumbent government.

In 2001, Finance Minister John Fahey, had announced that he would retire at the next election, as had Defence Minister Peter Reith. Deputy Prime Minister and Nationals leader Tim Fischer had resigned from the Ministry in 1999 and from Parliament in 2001.

Howard launched the Coalition's 2001 federal election campaign with a policy speech at the Sydney Recital Hall, on 28 October. In his address, Howard framed the election campaign in the following terms:

[T]his campaign and all the individual things that are being said in it, are being fought against the background of two overriding issues. They are the issue of national security and the issue of economic management.

The challenging post-9/11 international environment featured heavily as a backdrop and subtext to Howard's speech. Nevertheless, the campaign speech was broadranging in its scope. The speech promised increased defence, science and innovation spending and outlined an intention for social welfare reform with the intention of "reducing welfare dependency, of giving people an incentive to be in work and not be in welfare. Of reconnecting mature age workers with the work force".

Howard reiterated Coalition support for funding of independent schools, in the context of Labor Party proposals to channel funds away from independent schooling. He also reiterated support for private health insurance through a 30% tax rebate, to "take the load of public hospitals". Howard restated that the government did not support Australia ratifying the Kyoto Protocol, the first major agreement negotiated under the UN Framework Convention on Climate Change "until the full cost to Australia of that ratification is known" and said that the only way to have an effective international arrangement on greenhouse gas emissions would be to include the United States of America as well as developing countries. Howard proposed a First Child Tax Refund, to support families with new-borns and increased funding for aged care and a Tough on Drugs programme to improve "education and law enforcement and rehabilitation" (but which would not adopt the Labor Party proposal for heroin injecting room safehouses).

Australia's immigration policies towards asylum seekers were a significant issue in the campaign and on this topic, Howard said:

[W]e are a generous open hearted people taking more refugees on a per capita basis than any nation except Canada, we have a proud record of welcoming people from 140 different nations. But we will decide who comes to this country and the circumstances in which they come... We will be compassionate, we will save lives, we will care for people but we will decide and nobody else who comes to this country.

Howard accused the Beazley opposition of relentless negativity in relation to the government's economic reforms. The Beazley opposition proposed to roll back the GST and undo the government's industrial relations reforms. Howard said of the Hawke-Keating economic legacy that it had "left us with an horrendous debt legacy, they drove interest rates to unconscionable heights, they were insensitive to the plight of the average worker through levels of unemployment".

== Third term: 2001–2004 ==
In the Howard government's third term, international affairs were dominated by responses to 11 September Attacks and Australian forces were involved in wars in Afghanistan and Iraq.

In June 2001, John Howard selected Dr. Peter Hollingworth (an Anglican archbishop, welfare advocate and former Australian of the Year) as his recommendation for the post of Governor General. The Queen accepted Hollingworth's resignation in May 2003, after the Labor opposition called for his resignation following allegations that he had not adequately investigated church ministers accused of paedophilia while he was Archbishop of Brisbane. In June, Howard's chosen successor Major General Michael Jeffery became Governor-General and remained in the post until after Howard's 2007 election loss.

In April 2002 changes were made to Australian nationality law that allowed Australian citizens who had acquired another country's citizenship to keep their Australian citizenship concurrently.

Despite its victory in 2001, the government did not have a Senate majority, and its ability to pass planned legislation was restricted.

On 20 September 2003, the government abolished the Mature Age Allowance which was a welfare program for Australian citizens aged 55 and over eligible initiated by the Hawke government in 1987.

=== "War on Terror" ===
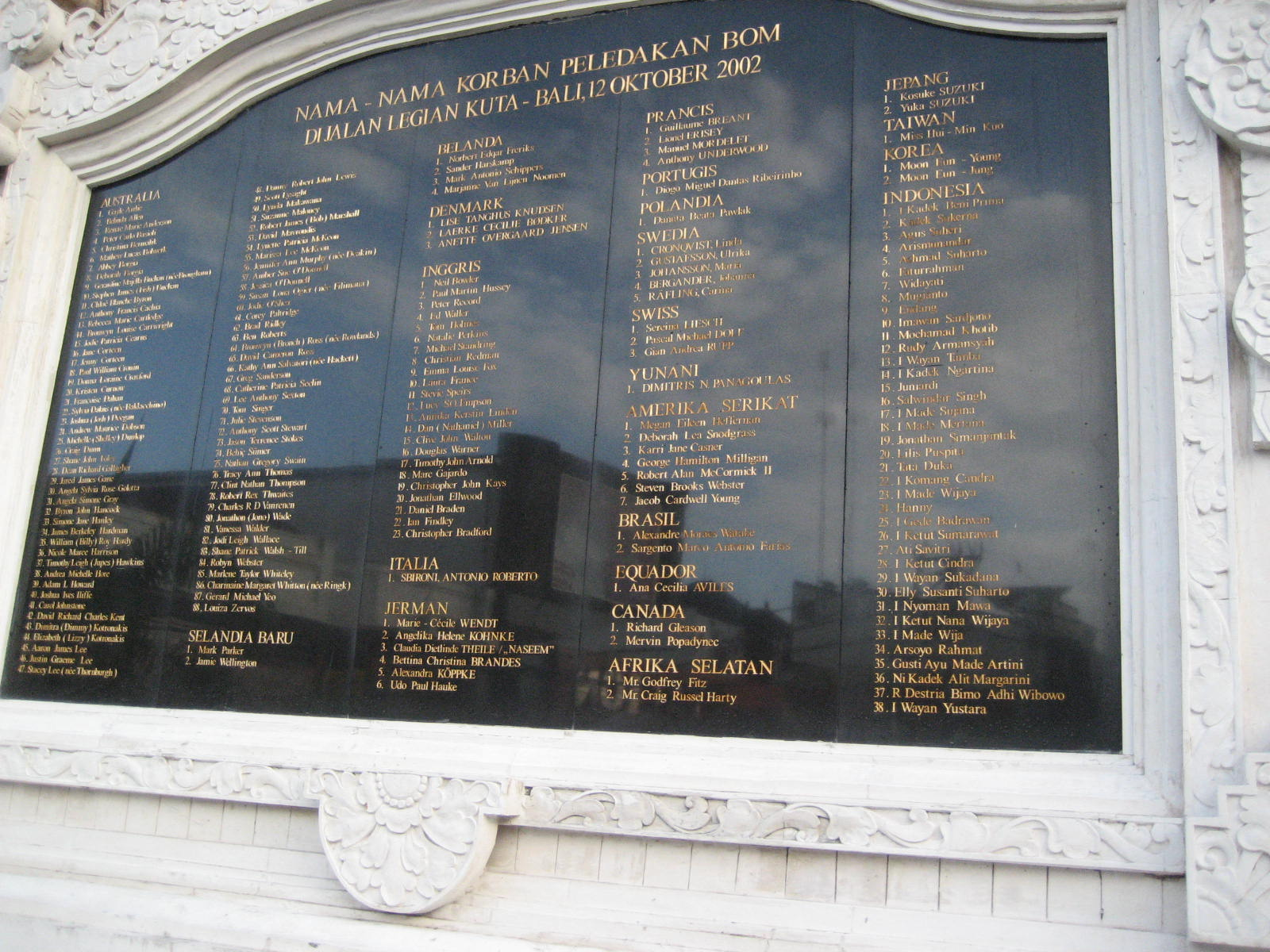
Memorial to the dead of the 2002 Bali bombing, in which 88 Australians were killed.

Following the 9/11 Al Qaeda attacks, the Howard government initially committed SAS troops as the most high-profile part of Operation Slipper, Australia's contribution to the international coalition invading force in the 2001 war in Afghanistan. The initial ADF commitment in Afghanistan concluded in November 2002 when the Special Air Service Task Group was withdrawn, however the Howard government sent a new contingent to Afghanistan in 2005.

A small number of Australians, including David Hicks, were captured in and around the Afghan Theatre having spent time training or fighting with Al Qaeda aligned Islamist paramilitaries. Hicks' internment at Guantanamo Bay detention camp became a highly controversial issue in the latter term of the Howard government.

Islamists following the Al Qaeda modus operandi bombed a nightclub in Bali in 2002, killing 88 Australian civilians.

Two days before the attack, the US issued a worldwide warning notice urging tourists to Bali to avoid "clubs, bars and restaurants" where Westerners congregate. The Australian government had received US intelligence identifying Bali as a possible target of a terrorist attack on Western tourists but did not change its advice to Australian holidaymakers. The Howard government did not issue a similar warning, though following the attack it issued a travel advisory warning against any travel to Indonesia.

In November 2002, the Howard government supported UN Resolution 1441, which outlined breaches by Saddam Hussein's Iraq of a succession of United Nations resolutions – among these that Iraq had refused to grant unrestricted access to United Nations Weapons inspectors in the decade since the Gulf War, and a series of other breaches relating to the peace treaty signed at the end the Gulf War. The resolution offered Iraq "a final opportunity to comply with its disarmament obligations" In March 2003, Australia supported a United States/United Kingdom coalition in the invasion of Iraq, on the basis that it was still in breach of UN Resolution 1441 and that Iraq possessed or was pursuing illegal weapons of mass destruction. At the outset of the war, Howard said that, "These reasons for our direct and urgent commitment to the cause of disarming Iraq must be seen against the background of the different world in which we now all live". He said that Iraq should be disarmed because of her "appalling track record"; because it would discourage other rogue states from pursuing WMD; because it would lessen the risk of WMD falling into the hands of terrorist groups; and because Australia should support the American alliance because "no nation is more important to our long-term security than that of the United States". Howard told the National Press Club on 13 March:

In our view if the world fails to deal once and for all with the problem of Iraq and its possession of weapons of mass destruction it will have given a green light to the further proliferation of these weapons and it will undo 30 years of hard international work, including by Australia, which has been designed to enforce not only conventions on chemical weapons but also the Nuclear Non-Proliferation Treaty.

Additionally, Howard outlined the extensive human rights abuses of the Iraqi regime had perpetrated against its own people, as well as the humanitarian cost of the ongoing UN sanctions regime against Iraq as supporting the case for war against Saddam.

Australia's commitment lasted until 2009. Australian opinion was divided on the war and large public protests against it occurred. The Simon Crean led Opposition did not dispute the intelligence suggesting that Iraq was in breach of UN resolutions regarding WMD, but came to a view that Australia should join a war against Iraq only if the UN Security Council called for such a move. Future Labor Prime Minister Kevin Rudd was promoted to the position of shadow minister for foreign affairs following the 2001 Election and outlined Labor's position in September 2002 by saying:

There is no debate or dispute as to whether Saddam Hussein possesses weapons of mass destruction. He does. There's no dispute as whether he's in violation of UN Security Council resolutions. He is. The argument before us is what sort of action should be taken... – Kevin Rudd, September 2002.

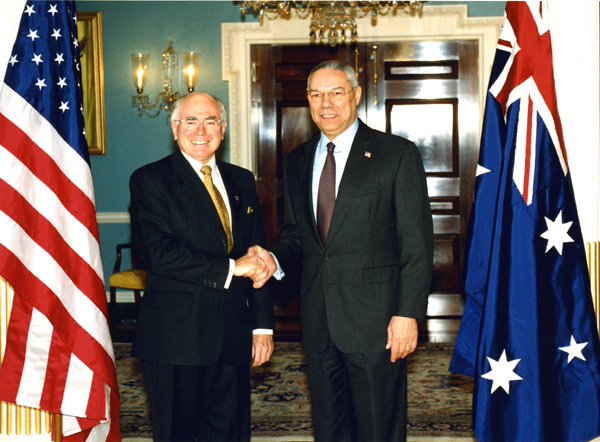
Howard with US Secretary of State Colin Powell in 2003.

Several senior figures from the Liberal party, including John Valder, a former president of the Liberal Party, and Howard's former friend and colleague, former Opposition Leader John Hewson and former Prime Minister Malcolm Fraser publicly criticised Howard over Iraq.

The Australian Greens and Australian Democrats opposed military action. On 5 February 2003, the Australian Senate presented its first vote of no-confidence against a serving leader for deploying troops to the Persian Gulf. The unprecedented vote carried no legislative power as the motion was defeated in the House of Representatives. Senior Australian intelligence officer Andrew Wilkie resigned from his job, citing ethical reasons. Wilkie later went on to challenge Howard in his electorate.

Ultimately, no advanced WMD programs were found in Iraq, but Saddam Hussein was tried and executed for crimes against humanity. Labor began to accuse the government of sending Australia to war on a "lie" by suggesting that Saddam had WMD. In March 2004, a Parliamentary Inquiry found that Australia's presentation of the case for war had been "more moderate" than that of Britain and United States and that "The committee found there was no interference in the work of the intelligence agencies". In response, Howard called a public inquiry into how Australia's intelligence services had misread Iraq's WMD capabilities in the lead up to the war.

On Anzac Day 2004, Howard made a surprise visit to Australian defence personnel in Iraq. This came amid a bitter debate in Australia over the war following opposition leader Mark Latham's promise to return Australian troops by Christmas, which exposed an apparent rift between Latham and Rudd on the subject. Howard successfully portrayed Latham as a threat to the US-Australia alliance, which contributed to a fall in Latham's popularity.

The Opposition, spearheaded by Kevin Rudd, sought to link Howard government figures to the bribery and corruption allegations regarding the Australian Wheat Board's involvement in UN Oil-for-Food Program in Iraq in the lead up to the Iraq War. Following a UN Report which found widescale breaches by the AWB, an 11-month commission of inquiry by former judge Terence Cole into the corruption of the UN's oil-for-food programme were made public in November 2006. The report found "no material that is any way suggestive of illegal activity by the [federal government] or any of its officers" but found that 11 former AWB executives should be considered for prosecution.

=== The Environment ===
Much of Eastern Australia was subject to prolonged period of drought during the third and fourth terms of the Howard government. In June 2004, the Council of Australian Governments agreed to a National Water Initiative and to the establishment of a seven-member National Water Commission to examine water management issues.

=== Same-sex relationships ===
In May 2004, and with the help of the Australian Democrats, the Howard government amended Australia's superannuation law to allow same-sex couples to inherit their partners' private sector superannuation. Announcing the May 2004 proposal, Howard said:

The changes we are announcing today will provide greater certainty for the payment of super death benefits for those involved in interdependency relationships including, of course, members of same-sex relationships.

The changes did not extend to members in Commonwealth superannuation schemes.

On 12 August 2004, the Senate passed the Howard government's Marriage Legislation Amendment Bill, with 38 ayes and 6 noes, that incorporated the common law definition of marriage—"the union of a man and a woman to exclusion of all others"—into the Marriage Act and the Family Law Act.

=== International affairs ===
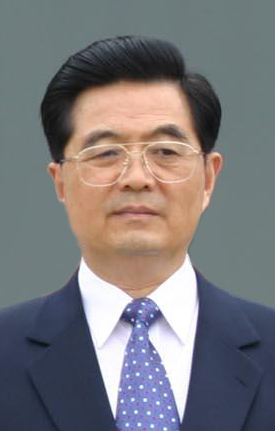
Hu Jintao became the first Chinese leader to address a joint sitting of the Australian Parliament in 2003. Australia-China trade underwent considerable expansion during the terms of the Howard government.

Australia hosted the 2002 Commonwealth Heads of Government Meeting (CHOGM) at Coolum, Queensland. Following widescale electoral fraud and human rights violations in Robert Mugabe's Zimbabwe, the CHOGM established a troika of Commonwealth statesmen: chaired by John Howard and also composed of President Olusegun Obasanjo of Nigeria and Thabo Mbeki of South Africa, it met in London and agreed that Zimbabwe should be suspended from the Commonwealth. The troika met a further time in Nigeria, but with little outcome. Howard continued to lobby within the Commonwealth for further action, but faced heated opposition from Mbeki and other leaders. Howard wrote in his 2010 biography that Zimbabwe had been the "just about the most demoralising foreign affairs issue" he ever faced as prime minister.

China entered into an agreement in 2002 to buy $25 billion worth of Australian natural gas. The prices have remained frozen for China and will remain so until 2031.

The Howard government signed a Free Trade Agreement with Singapore in February 2003 and in 2004, Australia and Thailand concluded a bilateral Free Trade Agreement.

July 2003 saw the Howard government dispatch forces to the Regional Assistance Mission to Solomon Islands (RAMSI), following a wide scale collapse of law and order in that nation. Led by Australia, and with the participation of regional partners like New Zealand and Papua New Guinea, the move was part of an activist regional foreign policy, which Howard described as a "paradigm shift" in which Australia was insisting on "reduced corruption, better economic management and improved criminal justice as conditions of ongoing aid".

By 2003, trade with China had tripled since arrival in office of the Howard government, and Chinese President Hu Jintao selected Australia as his first international port of call after taking office. Howard invited Hu to become the first Chinese leader to address the Australian Parliament. Over successive days in October 2003, first President George W. Bush of the United States and then President Hu of China addressed joint sittings of the Australian Parliament. In his 2010 memoir Lazarus Rising, Howard wrote that through both "coincidence and deliberation", no foreign policy events in the course of his prime ministership "came anywhere near the symbolism of these two days" and that, while he still judged the US to be the more important partner and intimate friend, he believed that:

In one unmistakeable gesture, Australia was telling the world that it was possible, simultaneously, to have close relations with both the United States and China.

In 2004, diplomatic relations resumed between Australia and North Korea.

=== 2004 election ===
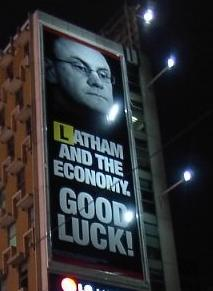
The Coalition portrayed Opposition Leader Mark Latham's as inexperienced during the campaign (in Australia, yellow "L-plates" are attached to cars driven by learner drivers).

On 29 August, John Howard announced a federal election for 9 October, telling reporters:

"This election, ladies and gentlemen, will be about trust... Who do you trust to keep the economy strong, and protect family living standards? Who do you trust to keep interest rates low? Who do you trust to lead the fight on Australia's behalf against international terrorism?

John Howard's election launch was conducted on 26 September 2004 at the Brisbane City Hall. The launch promised tax breaks for small business, extra funds for schools – both government and non-government schools – commitments to families, for both child care support and stay-at-home parent support; and a commitment to skills and training though the Australian technical colleges.

On 7 October, Howard told Tasmanian timber workers that a re-elected Coalition government would "preserve an extra 170,000 hectares of Tasmanian old-growth forest, while ensuring no job losses". The proposed preservation area was considerably less than Labor's promised 240,000 hectares and was condemned by Labor's Mark Latham, the Greens and the Democrats, but the announcement was greeted by loud cheers from an audience of 1500 timber workers in Launceston and was supported by local Labor member Dick Adams and the Labor aligned Construction, Forestry, Mining and Energy Union.

The Coalition campaign sought to portray Opposition Leader Mark Latham as inexperienced. On the final day of the election campaign, when Latham and Howard crossed paths outside a radio studio the apparently aggressive nature of Latham's handshake received wide media coverage.

The 2004 election saw the Howard government defeat the Mark Latham led Labor Opposition with an increased majority. The Coalition increased its majority in the House of Representatives, with the Liberals winning 74 seats, the National Party 12 and the Northern Territory Country Liberal Party one. Labor won 60 seats and three Independents were elected. In the Senate the Coalition won 21 seats to Labor's 16, with the Australian Greens winning two and the Family First Party winning one seat, leaving the government parties with a majority in the Senate for the first time since 1981. Howard retained his seat of Bennelong, despite a campaign by former president of the Liberal Party John Valder to remove him from the seat.

== Fourth term: 2004–2007 ==
The final term of the Howard government saw the government operating with a rare majority in the Upper House of Parliament, enabling the passage of long delayed elements of Howard's economic and industrial relations agenda. While Australia enjoyed good economic conditions, wars in Afghanistan and Iraq remained controversial. The Labor Party and Trade Union movement campaigned heavily against Howard's industrial relations reforms and opposed Australia's commitment to the Iraq war. In its final months, the government launched an historic "intervention" on Aboriginal health and education.

=== Tsunami and Changing Opposition Leaders ===
On 26 December 2004, a massive Tsunami devastated large areas of Indonesia, Thailand and Sri Lanka. Howard moved quickly to offer a A$1 Billion aid package and won praise from Indonesia's president for being first on the phone and first on the ground aiding Indonesia. After nose-diving at the time of the INTERFET intervention in East Timor in 1999, government-to-government ties with Indonesia had been strengthening in the aftermath of the 2002 Bali Bombing, notably through counter-terrorism co-operation and inter-faith dialogue. The Australian response to the tsunami further consolidated improving relations and a personal rapport between Indonesian President Susilo Bambang Yudhoyono and John Howard.

Opposition Leader Mark Latham came under criticism for failing to take time out from Christmas leave to comment on the tsunami disaster adding to growing speculation about his leadership. Citing ill-health, Latham resigned as Leader soon after and was replaced by veteran Kim Beazley. Unable to dent Howard's popularity as preferred prime minister, Beazley was replaced in December 2006 by Kevin Rudd.

=== Industrial relations ===
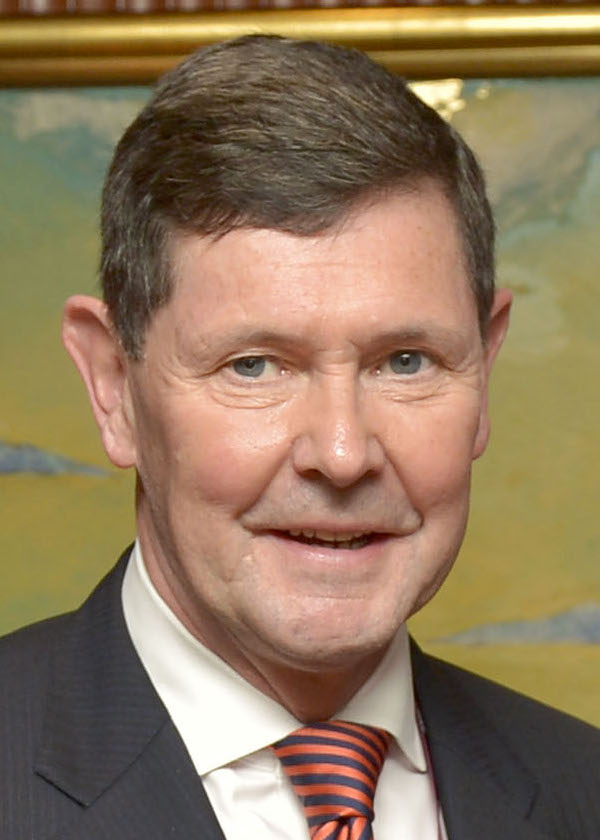
Kevin Andrews was Minister for Employment and Workplace Relations during the introduction and implementation of WorkChoices.

The government's senate majority allowed Howard and Costello to implement the final elements of their industrial relations policies envisaged under the Workplace Relations and Other Legislation Amendment Act 1997, which amended the Workplace Relations Act 1996. The WorkChoices policy sought to increase deregulation of the Australian employment market and replaced the former Commonwealth Employment Service with a competitive market of private employment service businesses.

In 2005, Howard announced significant changes to industrial relations laws. Government ministers, including Howard, felt the Coalition's new Senate majority should be used to implement the potentially unpopular legislation. From the time they were first hinted at, the changes became the subject of a national publicity campaign by the government and pronounced opposition from community groups, the union movement and state Labor governments.

WorkChoices became the focus of an intense campaign of opposition from the trade union movement and Australian Labor Party. On 15 November 2005, public rallies were held to protest against the industrial relations reforms. An estimated 100,000–175,000 people attended rallies in Melbourne and around 300 other meetings and rallies, held concurrently around the country, were also well attended. These meetings were organised by unions and community organisations with the help of Labor and the Greens. Due to the Coalition's slim majority in the Senate, the passage of the proposed laws was put in doubt following criticisms from Queensland National Party Senator Barnaby Joyce, although he later voted in support of the legislation. The industrial relations laws were passed without substantial change.

The policy was effected via the Workplace Relations Amendment (Work Choices) Act 2005, which amended the Workplace Relations Act 1996. WorkChoices continued to be unpopular after they came into effect on 27 March 2006. Opinion polls found that 63 percent of voters opposed WorkChoices in 2006 and 65 percent in 2007, and that the policy was reducing support for the Coalition. The government responded to the continuing union campaign against the reforms by conducting a large scale information campaign of its own. On 4 May 2007 Howard announced reforms to WorkChoices which included a new 'fairness test' to protect workers paid less than $75,000 a year. Despite these responses, the Labor Party's polling in 2007 found that opposition to WorkChoices was one of the three biggest vote drivers at the election.

=== Anti-terrorism measures ===
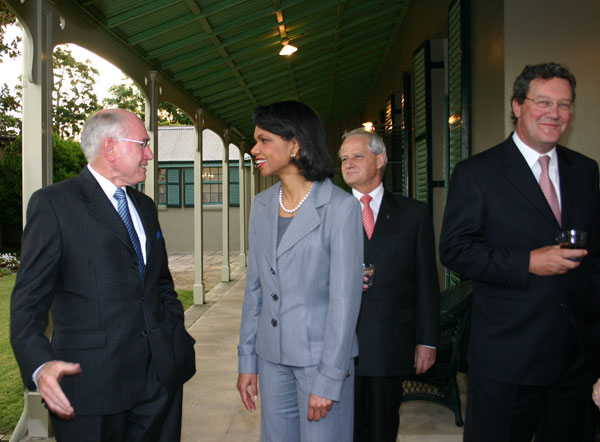
Howard with US Secretary of State Condoleezza Rice, Attorney General Philip Ruddock and Foreign Minister Alexander Downer in March 2006.

In mid-2005, John Howard and his cabinet began discussions of new anti-terror legislation which includes modification to the Crimes Act 1914. In particular, sections relating to sedition are to be modified. On 14 October 2005, Jon Stanhope (Chief Minister of the ACT) took the controversial step of publishing the confidential draft of the Federal Anti-Terrorism Bill 2005 on his website. This action was both praised and criticised. Citing concerns about civil rights raised by the Australian National University as well as concerns over the speed of the legislation's passage through parliament, he later refused to sign off on a revised version of the legislation, becoming the only State and Territorial leader not to sign. The House of Representatives passed the anti-terrorism legislation which was debated in the Senate before its final implementation in December 2005.

On 2 November 2005, Howard held a press conference to announce that he had received information from police and the Australian Security Intelligence Organisation (ASIO) that indicated an imminent terrorist attack in Australia. Within a week, on 8 November, anti-terrorist raids were held across Melbourne and Sydney, with 17 suspected terrorists arrested, including Abdul Nacer Benbrika. Howard later stated that these raids demonstrated the need for his Anti-Terrorism Bill.

After Mohamed Haneef spent 12 days in jail without charges (he was incorrectly suspected to have supported the perpetrators of the foiled terror attacks in London and Glasgow in July 2007), the anti-terrorism bill and its impact on the separation of powers became more publicly discussed. When a judge found insufficient evidence for the charges against Haneef, Minister of Immigration Kevin Andrews withdrew Haneef's working visa. While the Howard government unequivocally backed Kevin Andrew's decision, members of the judicial community in Australia expressed concern about the interference of the government in judicial proceedings.

=== Mandatory detention policy ===
Throughout the first half of 2005, the Howard government faced pressure regarding the controversial mandatory detention program, introduced in 1992 by the Keating Labor government.

It was revealed in February that a mentally ill German citizen and Australian resident, Cornelia Rau, had been held in detention for nine months. The government then established the closed non-judicial Palmer Inquiry promising that the findings would be made public. In May, it was revealed that another Australian, subsequently identified as Vivian Solon, had been deported from Australia and that the department responsible was unable to locate her. By late May, it was revealed that an additional 200 cases of possible wrongful detention had been referred to the Palmer Inquiry. Also at this time Howard faced backbench revolt from small numbers of his own party demanding that reforms be made. On 9 June Australia's longest serving detainee, Peter Qasim, was moved to a psychiatric hospital.

In June 2005, several backbenchers including Petro Georgiou challenged the Howard government's holding of asylum-seeker children in immigration detention centres. Over 2000 asylum-seeker children were held in detention centres during previous years. The longest period a child was detained was 5 years.

Under the agreement between Howard and the MPs, legislation was introduced to "soften" the detention system enacted in 1992. Detained families with children were moved out of detention centres and placed in "community detention", and people detained over two years received an ombudsman review. Questioned as to why the government had not acted sooner, Howard was quoted as saying: "We have to confess that was one of the many failings of this government."

In 2003, economist Ross Gittins, a columnist at Fairfax Media, said former Prime Minister John Howard had been "a tricky chap " on immigration, by appearing "tough" on illegal immigration to win support from the working class, while simultaneously winning support from employers with high legal immigration.

=== Foreign media ownership ban repeal ===
In October 2006, the Howard government passed a law that repealed a ban on foreign ownership of the media.

=== Energy and the environment ===
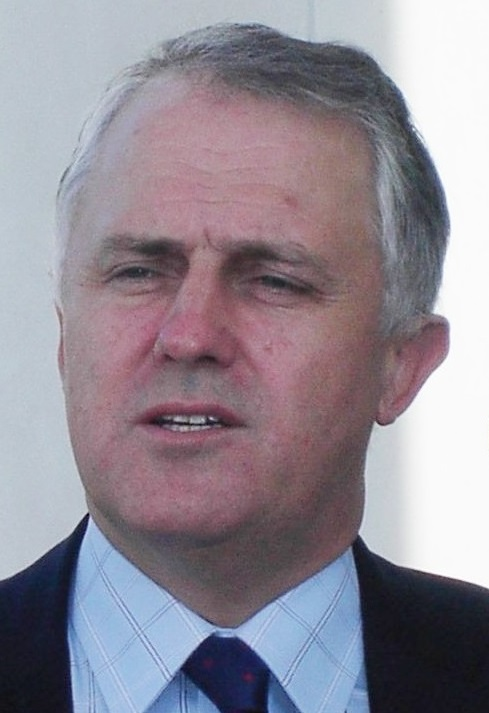
Malcolm Turnbull became Minister for the Environment in 2007.

The Howard government initially negotiated favourable Kyoto Protocol targets for Australia (8% growth on 1990 levels) and Australia was estimated to have matched that target in 2007 at the close of the Howard government's term. Nevertheless, it elected not to sign the Treaty following the withdrawal of United States support for the process. Howard argued that without the involvement of the United States and without binding emission reduction targets for the other large emitters in the developing world, in particular China and India, the Treaty would not be viable and could harm Australia's coal industry without effectively reducing global emissions.

[Ratifying Kyoto] could have damaged the comparative advantage this country enjoyed as a result of our abundance of fossil fuels and the importance of that abundance to Australia's export and general performance. [...] I do not intend to preside over policy changes in this area that are going to rob Australia of her competitive advantage in the industries that are so important to us.

— John Howard, speech to the Business Council of Australia, 2006

On 6 June 2006, Howard announced a task force to conduct the "Uranium Mining, Processing, and Nuclear Energy Review", the terms of reference of which include "the extent to which nuclear energy will make a contribution to the reduction of global greenhouse gas emissions".

Howard announced on 10 December 2006 the formation of a Prime Ministerial Task Group on Emissions Trading. On 3 February 2007, the Australian government announced that it could not by itself have a significant effect on mitigation of global warming, though it would continue to make efforts to cut greenhouse gases; it would be necessary for Australia to find means of adaptation. On 4 June 2007, Howard reversed the decision and announced a new Carbon Trading Scheme to be in place in Australia by 2012. The lengthy timeline was welcomed by investors, who were only asking for three years to plan for the scheme's introduction.

In July 2007, Howard announced in a video message on his website, a government plan to introduce a new "cap and trade" emissions trading system and a $627 million increase to spending on measures to tackle climate change. The scheme was planned to enter into operation by 2011, however the policy could not be implemented following the Coalition's loss at the 2007 election.

At APEC 2007, Howard and other leaders signed the Sydney Declaration which saw developing countries officially agree, for the first time, on the need to set goals for cutting greenhouse gas emissions.

=== Northern Territory intervention ===
In August 2007, Prime Minister Howard and Indigenous Affairs minister Mal Brough announced the $1.6 billion Northern Territory National Emergency Response (NTER, or "The Intervention"). This package of revisions to welfare provisions, law enforcement and other measures was advanced as a plan for addressing child abuse in Aboriginal Northern Territory communities that had been highlighted by the "Little Children are Sacred" report in mid-June.

While the scheme received bi-partisan support from the Opposition led by Kevin Rudd, and the commitments to health and policing improvements were generally well received, other aspects of the plan were criticised. A key component of the intervention included compulsory acquisition by the federal government of local community land leases for a five-year period; and removal of the permit system that had been designed to allow aboriginal communities to control access to their land, but which Mal Brough had been arguing was in fact contributing to Aboriginal disadvantage by preventing aboriginal camps from becoming normal suburbs and towns.

Another controversial aspect of the plan was the introduction of welfare income management among prescribed communities. These provisions forced 50% of government welfare payments to be reserved by recipients strictly for purchasing essential goods such as food. Alcohol and pornography were also banned in these communities. Critics of the scheme labelled these measures discriminatory.

The plan drew criticism from the Little Children Are Sacred report's authors for incorporating few of the report's recommendations, and was broadly criticised by Lowitja O'Donoghue and the Dodson brothers; however it received support from activists including Marcia Langton, Sue Gordon and Noel Pearson. Pearson outlined qualified support: "I'm in agreement with the emphasis on grog and policing. I'm in agreement with attaching conditions to welfare payments. But the difference between the proposals that we've put forward to the government... there is a difference in that we would be concerned that those people who are acting responsibly in relation to the payments they receive, should continue to exercise their freedoms and their decisions, we should only target cases of responsibility failure" Some critics, like Northern Territory Labor Parliamentarian Marion Scrymgour questioned the government's motives implying that the intervention was an attempt at pre-election "wedge politics".

=== Economy ===
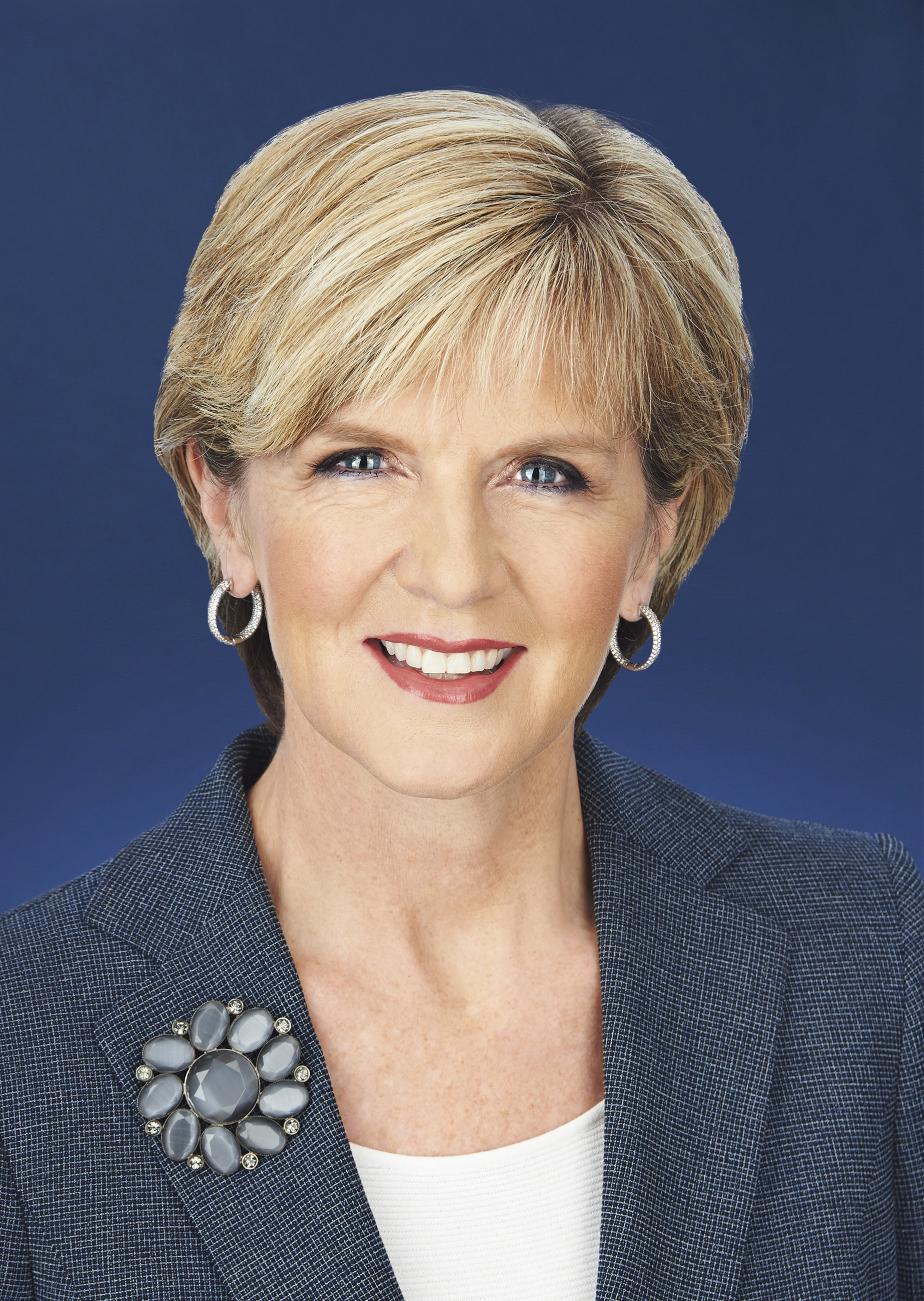
Julie Bishop served as Minister for Education, Science and Training from 2006. The final Costello Budget contained a number of education initiatives.

The Howard government's fourth term took place during a period of exceptional economic growth and prosperity. During the term over 855,000 new jobs were created, unemployment declined to just over four percent and inflation generally remained within the Reserve Bank of Australia's (RBA's) target range of 2–3 percent Due in part to changes made to the way in which the rate was calculated, creating the appearance of an improvement. The government also completed repaying the Commonwealth's debt and recorded surpluses in each of its budgets during the term. Australia's strong economic performance was largely attributed to the reforms made by both the Hawke-Keating government and Howard government and the growth in the world economy over the same period. Growth in Australia's productivity did slow during the Howard government's fourth term, however, and many areas of Australia's infrastructure reached capacity and required reform. The Howard government's ability to drive these reforms was limited by the lack of a working relationship with many of the state and territory governments.

The RBA's use of monetary policy was a significant issue during the government's fourth term. A key element of the government's campaign in the 2004 election was the argument that only a Coalition government could keep interest rates low. As a result, the ALP was able to use the RBA's six interest rate increases over the term to criticise the government. The interest rate increases and strong growth in house prices during this period contributed to housing affordability reaching an all-time low.

Changes to fiscal policy introduced in the 2004–05 budget included a 'baby bonus', increased tax benefits for families with children, and lower income tax rates for all Australians. The family benefits introduced by the Howard government led to middle-income households becoming the largest single group of social welfare recipients. The superannuation system was also changed in 2007 to allow most people to withdraw their superannuation tax-free after they reached the age of 60 and to increase incentives for semi-retired people to work part-time. Once the Commonwealth debt was repaid, the government used its financial surplus to establish a 'Future Fund' to pay its superannuation liabilities and a Higher Education Endowment Fund was established in the 2006–07 Budget. The government also negotiated and signed several free trade agreements between 2004 and 2007, including one with the United States which had been mostly negotiated during the third term.

On 15 September 2005, the Senate passed the Telstra (Transition to Full Private Ownership) Bill 2005. The first sale one third sale had been in 1997, under the Telstra (Dilution of Public Ownership).

The Howard government's 12th and final budget was brought down by Treasurer Costello in May 2007. In his Budget address, Costello told Parliament that Australia had recorded the longest economic expansion in its history and had unemployment at a 30-year low: Costello also announced a number of measures aimed at the education sector: including a Higher Education Endowment Fund, literacy and numeracy initiatives for schools, and measures to support vocational education and training and higher education. The Higher Education Endowment Fund had provision for tax concessions for private donors and offered $5 billion of seed money to pay for university buildings and research facilities. The government also promised income tax cuts and a range of welfare and aged care adjustments. Amidst severe drought, the government promised a $10 billion National Plan for Water Security and measures for drought assistance. The issue of Climate Change also received attention, including a solar panel rebate scheme and increased funds for research and technology.

Negotiations for the Japan-Australia Economic Partnership Agreement were commenced by the Howard government in 2007, and concluded under the Abbott government in 2014.

A 2013 report by the International Monetary Fund identified the period of 2005–2007 under the Howard government as the most fiscally "profligate" in Australian history.

=== Other activities ===
Other previously blocked legislation secured by the government in this term included abolition of compulsory university student union fees and the liberalisation of media ownership laws (by lowering restrictions on media companies owning multiple different media). The government instructed the Governor-General to disallow the Civil Unions Act. In April 2006, the government announced it had completely paid off the last of $96 billion of Commonwealth net debt inherited when it came to power in 1996. In response, Macquarie Bank economist Richard Gibbs spoke in favor of the "prudent management of debt" but cautioned that some level of debt was not necessarily bad, and that some of the debt had been transferred to the private sector.

In 2005, the Howard government abolished the Aboriginal and Torres Strait Islander Commission (ATSIC), the only federal body charged with formally representing indigenous Australians. This was done in response to concerns that its organisational structure was conducive to corrupt behaviour by its officers.

In 2006, the Howard government established a $20,000 grant for schools to employ a chaplain in the National school chaplaincy program.

=== International affairs ===
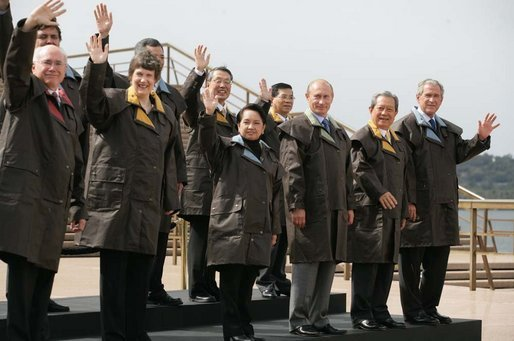
Howard and other APEC leaders at APEC Australia 2007

Australia's commitment to the Iraq War continued through the final term of the Howard government, and an Australian military presence in Afghanistan recommenced in 2005 and was expanded as that conflict continued.

Following the 2004 Asian tsunami, the government pledged US$820 million worth of assistance to affected countries, including US$761 million for Indonesia. In 2005, with the support of Indonesia, the Howard government secured a seat for Australia at the East Asian Summit.

In 2005, Howard reflected on his government's cultural and foreign policy outlook in oft repeated terms:

When I became Prime Minister nine years ago, I believed that this nation was defining its place in the world too narrowly. My Government has rebalanced Australia's foreign policy to better reflect the unique intersection of history, geography, culture and economic opportunity that our country represents. Time has only strengthened my conviction that we do not face a choice between our history and our geography.

John Howard conducted his second visit to India in 2006. The Australia-India relations trade relationship had not undergone the growth witnessed in other regional markets during the term of the Howard government, but during talks India expressed a desire to purchase Australian uranium. The Howard government moved to overturn Australia's policy of not selling the material to India on the basis of it being a non-signatory to the Nuclear Non-Proliferation Treaty. Howard wanted to expand Australia-India relations, and supported moves for India to be included in a Quadrilateral Security Dialogue involving India, Australia, Japan and the United States. Following Howard's loss at the 2007 Election, the Rudd government discarded the Howard government's support for uranium sales to India, and for its inclusion in a new regional defence alliance.

Following continued political violence in Zimbabwe, the Howard government moved in May 2007 to ban the Australian cricket team from conducting a tour of Zimbabwe. Howard branded Robert Mugabe of Zimbabwe a "grubby dictator" and said that he feared that an Australian tour would be used for propaganda purposes by the repressive Mugabe regime.

Discussion of increased Japanese-Australian-USA defence ties was also discussed when the Howard government played host to the 2007 APEC meeting, culminating in a Leaders Week in Sydney. Leaders, including US President Bush, Chinese President Hu Jintao and Russian President Vladimir Putin discussed trade, climate change, energy security, counter-terrorism and anti-corruption policy for the Asia Pacific. In important trade agreements, Woodside Energy and PetroChina Company Limited signed a $45 billion agreement to supply China with LNG gas, and Russia and Australia signed a nuclear co-operation pact to import more than $1 billion a year in Australian uranium. In climate change policy, the Sydney Declaration saw developing countries (notably China) officially agree on the need to set goals for cutting greenhouse gas emissions.

=== 2007 election loss ===
Opposition Leader Kevin Rudd's policy speech for the Australian Labor Party in the lead up to the 2007 federal election was held at the Queensland Performing Arts Centre in Brisbane on 14 November 2007. Rudd identified the "challenges of climate change and water. The challenges of the digital economy. The challenge of the rise of China and India. The challenge to fix our hospitals, once and for all. And above all, the challenge to transform our education system" as important election issues; criticised the Workchoices industrial relations changes; and drew attention to Howard's intention to retire after the election in favour of Treasurer Costello.

The Howard government campaigned under a slogan of "go-for-growth", but Treasurer Costello predicted uncertain economic conditions ahead. In his first newspaper interview of the campaign, Costello warned of an impending economic "tsunami" approaching the international financial markets, and predicted that the United States economy would weaken in the wake of its subprime mortgage crisis, while the pace of Chinese growth would slow.

Following earlier publicity surrounding discontent from Costello at Howard's refusal to resign as leader in his favour prior to the 2007 Election, Howard and Costello appeared together on Channel Seven's Today Tonight program in an effort to address the issue of the Coalition's leadership succession plan.

For most of 2007, polling by various companies including Newspoll indicated that the Howard government was likely to be defeated if it went to an election. The election, held on 24 November, represented a 5.44 percent swing against the government nationwide, with a much stronger swing in Queensland of 7.53%. Howard lost his seat, as did three of his ministers (Gary Nairn, Mal Brough and Jim Lloyd) and 17 other Coalition MPs, although the Liberals gained two marginal Labor seats in Western Australia. The Rudd government was sworn into office on 3 December 2007.

Following the election, Liberal Party was in opposition throughout Australia at the state and federal level; the highest Liberal office-holder at the time was Brisbane Lord Mayor Campbell Newman. This ended after the 2008 Western Australian state election, when Colin Barnett became Premier of that state.

== See also ==
- First Howard Ministry
- Second Howard Ministry
- Third Howard Ministry
- Fourth Howard Ministry
- SIEV X

== Bibliography ==
- Evans, Harry (2000). "The Howard Government and the Parliament". In Singleton, Gwynneth (ed.). The Howard government: Australian Commonwealth Administration 1996–1998. Sydney: UNSW Press. pp. 26–36. ISBN 978-0-86840-761-6.
- Garnett, Anne; Lewis, Phil (2008). "The economy". In Chris Aulich and Roger Wettenhall (ed.). Howard's Fourth Government. Australian Commonwealth Administration 2004–2007. Sydney: UNSW Press. ISBN 978-0-86840-982-5.
- Megalogenis, George (2008). The Longest Decade (Revised ed.). Melbourne: Scribe. ISBN 978-1-921215-94-0.
