= P8 =

P8, P-8, P.8, or P 8 may refer to:

== In transportation or aviation ==
- Boeing XP-8, 1920s US prototype biplane
- Boeing P-8 Poseidon, anti-submarine warfare and maritime patrol aircraft
- Bowin P8, Formula 5000 and Formula 2 race cars
- Pantanal Linhas Aéreas, Brazilian former airline with IATA code P8
- Piaggio P.8, 1928 Italian floatplane
- Prussian P 8, German locomotive, 1906–1923
- SprintAir, Polish airline, IATA code P8

== In technology ==
- FileNet P8, system development framework
- Huawei P8, phablet
- Sony Cyber-shot DSC-P8, camera

== In other fields ==
- Heckler & Koch P8, a 9 mm pistol
- Luger P08, a 9mm pistol
- P8 abbreviation for octave interval
- P8, Political Eight, or "G7+1", see G8
- P8 Group of pension funds
- P_{8}, a hypothetical allotrope of phosphorus
- Danish public radio station DR P8 Jazz

== See also ==
- 8P (disambiguation)
- Pate (disambiguation)
