= Regeneration =

Regeneration may refer to:

== Science and technology ==
- Regeneration (biology), the ability to recreate lost or damaged cells, tissues, organs and limbs
- Regeneration (ecology), the ability of ecosystems to regenerate biomass, using photosynthesis
- Regeneration in humans, the ability of humans to recreate, or induce the regeneration of, lost tissue
- Regenerative design, a process for resilient and sustainable development
- Regenerative agriculture, a sub-category of organic agriculture
- Regenerative circuit, an early radio circuit
- Superregenerative receiver, a high-gain early radio circuit

== History and politics ==
- Regeneration (Colombia), La Regeneración, a 19th-century period and political movement in Colombia
- Regeneration (Portugal), a 19th-century period in the history of Portugal
- The ReGeneration, a cultural generation concerned with environmentalism
- Viðreisn (Regeneration), a political party in Iceland founded in 2016

== Music ==
- Regeneration (Stanley Cowell album) (1976)
- Regeneration (Roy Orbison album) (1977)
- Regeneration (The Divine Comedy album) (2001)
- Regeneration (Superchick album) (2003)

== Film and television ==
- Regeneration (1915 film), a film starring John McCann
- Regeneration (1923 film), a Norman Studios production
- Regeneration (1997 film) or Behind the Lines, a film adapted from the Pat Barker novel
- Re-generation (The Outer Limits), a 1997 episode of The Outer Limits
- Regeneration (Star Trek: Enterprise), a 2003 episode of Star Trek: Enterprise
- ReGeneration (2010 film), a documentary film
- Regeneration, a 2012 episode of Transformers: Prime

== Literature ==
- Regeneration (Haggard book), a 1910 non-fiction work by H. Rider Haggard
- Regeneration (novel), a novel by Pat Barker
- Regeneration, a book by Thomas Hunt Morgan

== Other uses ==
- Regeneration (sculpture), a 1975 sculpture by Alan Collins
- Regeneration (theology), the doctrine of being born again
- Evil Dead: Regeneration, a 2005 video game for the PlayStation 2 and Xbox

== See also ==
- Bush regeneration, an ecological technique practiced in Australia
- DPF regeneration, removing soot from a diesel particulate filter
- Hydrochloric acid regeneration, a chemical process for the reclamation of HCl from metal chloride solutions as hydrochloric acid
- Presumptive regeneration, the idea that the children of Christians will be born again because God cares for and chooses families as well as individuals
- Regenerative amplification, a process used to generate short but strong pulses of laser light
- Regenerative brake, an apparatus or system which allows a vehicle to recapture energy normally lost to heat when braking
- Regeneration buffer (or regen buffer for short), a kind of video memory buffer in computer video hardware
- Regenerative capacitor memory, a type of computer memory used in the Atanasoff–Berry computer
- Regenerative circuit, a circuit in electronics that allows a signal to be amplified many times
- Regenerative cooling (rocket), a process in rocket engines
- Regenerative medicine, Clinical therapy to replace or regenerate human cells, tissue or organs, to restore or establish normal function
- Regenerative process, a class of stochastic processes in applied probability
- Urban regeneration, or urban renewal
- Regeneración, Mexican newspaper
