= Huawei Ascend P7 =

2014 Android smartphone

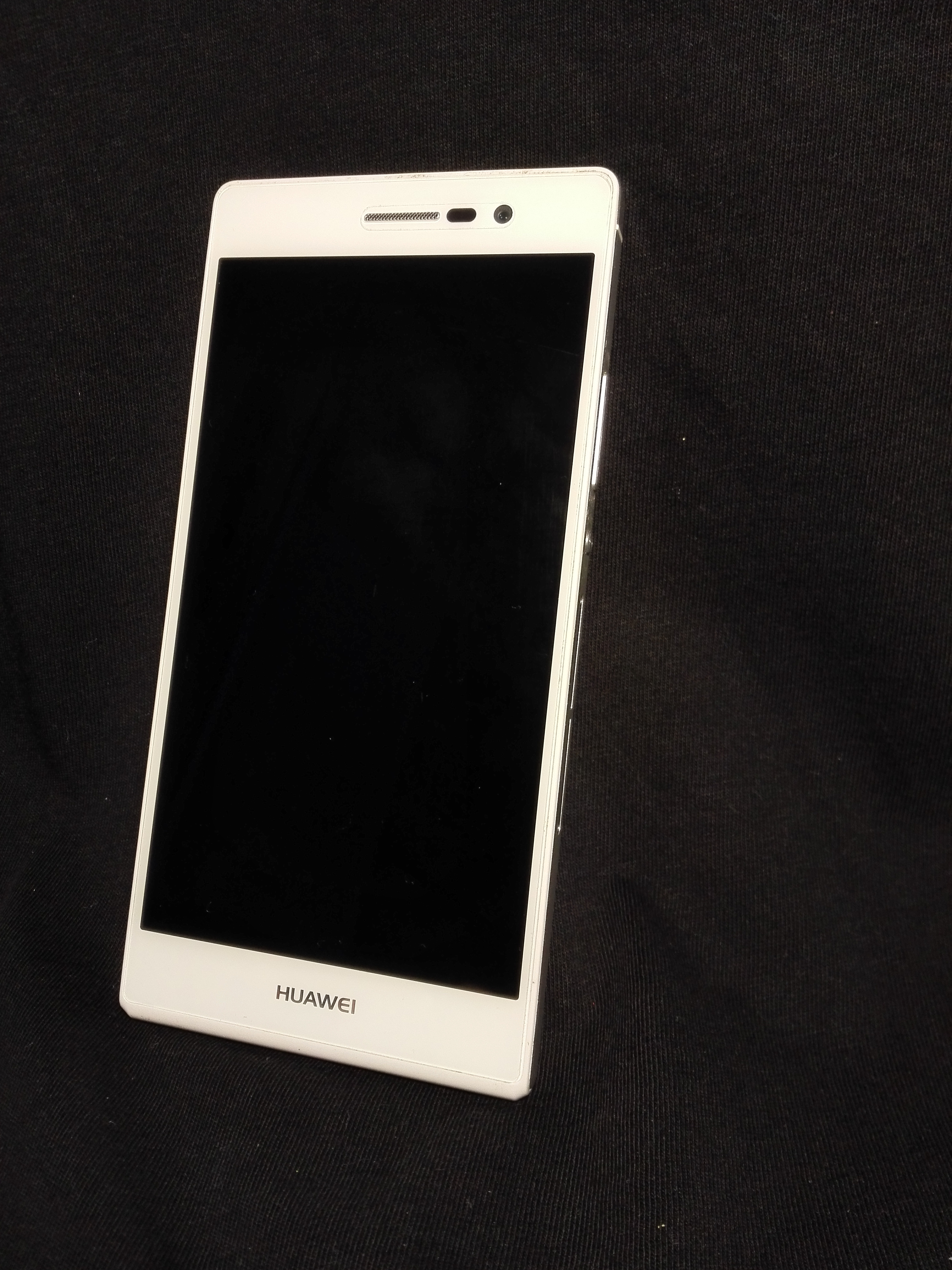
- Huawei Ascend P7 white version
- Manufacturer: Huawei Technologies
- Series: Huawei Ascend; Huawei P-series
- First released: 12 June 2014; 12 years ago
- Discontinued: April 2015
- Predecessor: Huawei Ascend P6
- Successor: Huawei P8
- Related: Huawei Ascend P7 mini Huawei Honor 6
- Dimensions: 139.8×68.8×6.5 mm (5.50×2.71×0.26 in)
- Weight: 124 g (4 oz)
- Operating system: Original: Android 4.4.2 "KitKat" with EMUI v2.3 Current: Android 5.1.1 "Lollipop" with EMUI v3.1
- System-on-chip: HiSilicon Kirin 910T
- CPU: Quad-core 1.8 GHz Cortex-A9
- GPU: Mali-450
- Memory: 2 GB (RAM)
- Storage: 16 GB (ROM) + expandable with microSD memory card (up to 64 GB)
- SIM: nanoSIM
- Battery: Li-Ion 2500 mAh
- Charging: NA
- Rear camera: 13-MP autofocus, LED flash
- Front camera: 8-MP
- Display: 5.0 inch 1920x1080 px LED-backlit IPS LCD
- Connectivity: Bluetooth 4.0 with A2DP microUSB 2.0; 3.5 mm audio jack a-GPS and GLONASS; Wi-Fi 802.11 b/g/n NFC; GSM 800 / 850 / 900 / 1800 / 1900 HSPA 850 / 1900 / 2100 / 2600
- Data inputs: Multi-touch capacitive touchscreen, Accelerometer
- Codename: Sophia
- Website: Ascend P7

The Huawei Ascend P7 (also known as Huawei P7) is a high-end smartphone by Huawei running the Android operating system. It was announced in May 2014 and released in June 2014. It received mixed to positive reviews, with most critics noting the slim glass construction, good front camera quality, and slow processor.

== Specifications ==
The Huawei Ascend P7 supports GSM, HSPA and LTE networking. It uses a 5-inch IPS display with 1080p resolution. It uses the HiSilicon Kirin 910T quad-core 1.8 GHz Cortex-A9 CPU with Mali-450 graphics. It contains 2GB of RAM and 16GB storage, expandable with an microSD card up to 64GB. It features a 13 MP rear camera with autofocus and LED flash that supports 1080p video recording, and an 8 MP front camera. It supports dual-band 802.11 a/b/g/n Wi-Fi communication with Wi-Fi Direct, DLNA and hotspot functions, Bluetooth 4.0 with A2DP and low energy mode, GPS with A-GPS and GLONASS, near field communication, and FM radio. It uses a non-removable lithium polymer 2500 mAh battery that supports up to 422 hours of 3G standby time, 22 hours of 2G talk time and 14 hours of 3G talk time.

== Reception ==
The Huawei Ascend P7 received mixed to positive reviews. Andrew Hoyle of CNET praised the 6.5 mm thin body with glass construction, high-resolution front camera, and bright full HD display, but argued about its slow processor and inconvenient Android skin. Gary Cutlack of TechRadar liked the launcher design lacking an app drawer, the image quality of the front-facing camera, and the low weight, but disliked the low battery life and unresponsive user interface. The review noted that the phone was "uninspiring" and cannot effectively compete with other 2014 flagship devices such as the Samsung Galaxy S5 and the HTC One (M8), despite its relatively high off-contract price. Daniel P. of PhoneArena appreciated the design of the device, good quality 1080p display, and camera quality, but noted its mid-range processor and slow web browser.

== Software support ==
The Ascend P7 is upgradeable to Android Lollipop (5.1), and the latest security update was released in August 2017.
