= Regeneration (sustainability) =

Regeneration refers to rethinking and reinventing business models, supply chains, and lifestyles to sustain and improve the earth's natural environment and avoid the depletion of natural resources. Regeneration includes widespread environmental practices such as reusing, recycling, restoring, and the use of renewable resources.

== History ==
The modern environmental movement gained traction in the early 1970s following the United Nations Conference on the Human Environment, the first time multiple nations joined to discuss the state of the world's environment.

On World Environment Day 2007, Dell Inc. chief executive Michael Dell launched a corporate campaign centred on the idea of a “ReGeneration” – consumers committed to recycling, renewable energy, and broader environmental stewardship. Many of the original theories of change came from writers, thinkers, and designers such as Wendell Berry, Buckminster Fuller, David Orr and Frank Lloyd Wright. These individuals saw a shift happening in humanity toward a rekindled connection with nature and inspired monumental changes in our approach and perspectives on topics such as building community, our relationship with agriculture and architecture, as well as the disconnect between modern economics on a finite planet.

Thought leaders like Paul Hawken, Kate Raworth, Naomi Klein, David Suzuki, and Bill McKibben have modernized the discourse and given the environmental movement a new set of tools in the form of conscious capitalism and positive climate communication.

== See also ==
- 2007 in the environment
- Biomimicry
- Ecological design
- Environmental design
- Permaculture
- Sustainable design
- Regeneration (disambiguation)
