= 8P =

8P can refer to:

- Barbados, International Telecommunication Union (ITU) prefix 8P
- Pacific Coastal Airlines, IATA airline designator
- Trade Air, IATA airline designator
- 8p, an arm of Chromosome 8 (human)

== See also ==
- P8 (disambiguation)
