= Huawei P8 =

Smartphone developed by Huawei

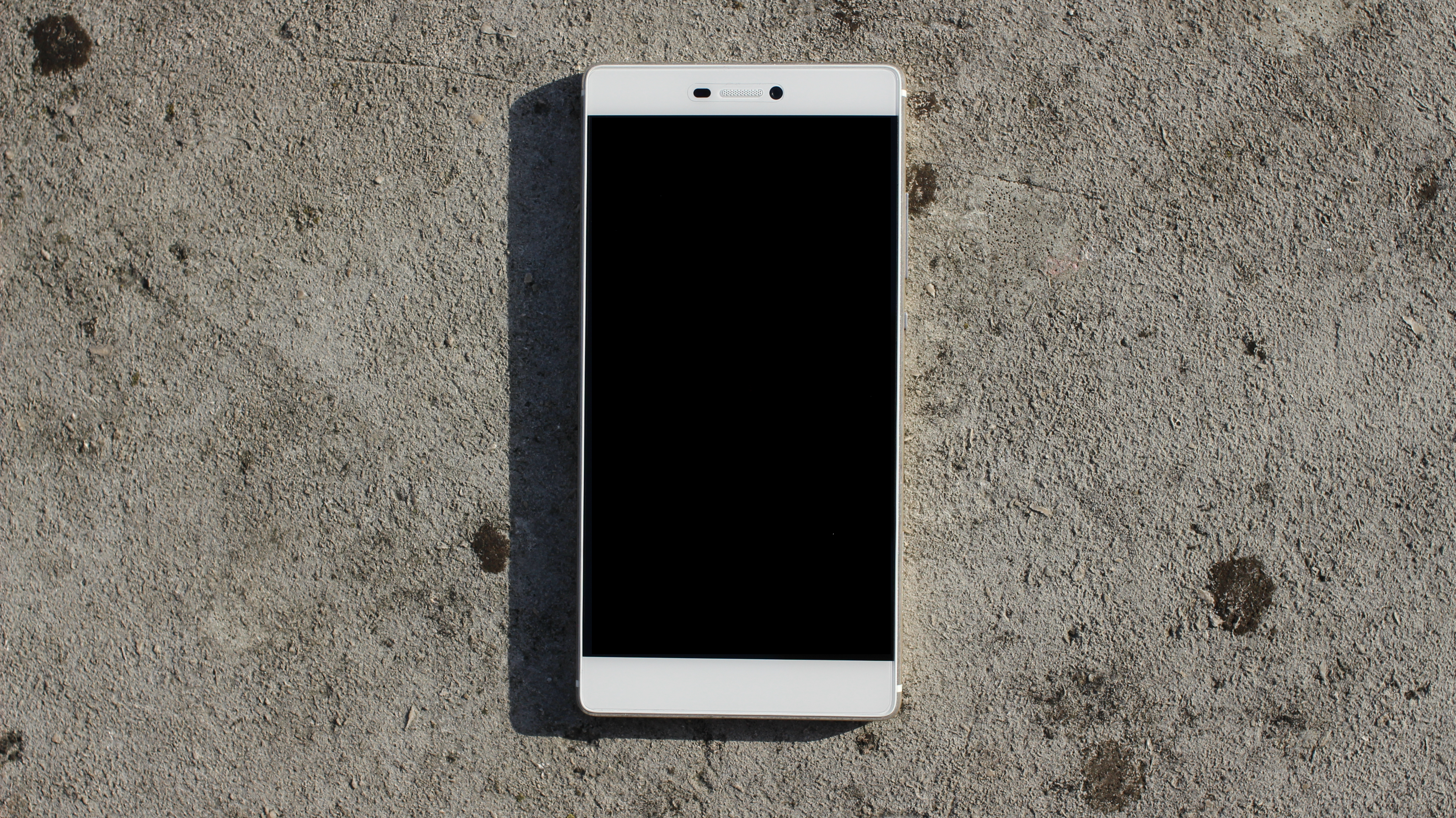
- Brand: Huawei
- Manufacturer: Huawei
- Type: Smartphone
- Series: Huawei P series
- First released: April 2015; 11 years ago
- Discontinued: Discontinued
- Units sold: 12 Million
- Predecessor: Huawei Ascend P7
- Successor: Huawei P9
- Related: Huawei P8 Lite; Huawei P8 Max
- Operating system: Android 4.4.2 "KitKat" upgradable to Android 6.0 "Marshmallow"
- System-on-chip: HiSilicon Kirin 930/935
- CPU: Octa Core(Quad-core 2 GHz Cortex-A53 & quad-core 1.5 GHz Cortex-A53)
- GPU: Mali-T628 MP4
- Memory: 3 GB RAM
- Storage: 16 GB; 64 GB (Premium Edition)
- Removable storage: microSD, up to 128 GB
- SIM: nanoSIM
- Battery: Non-removable Li-Po 2680 mAh battery
- Charging: NA
- Rear camera: 13 MP, 4160 x 3120 pixels, RGBW, auto-focus, optical image stabilization, dual-LED (dual tone) flash, 1080p@30fps video recording
- Front camera: 8 MP, 1080p
- Display: 5.2" 1080 x 1920 pixels IPS-NEO LCD capacitive multitouch display, 16M colors
- External display: None
- Connectivity: 2G: GSM 850 / 900 / 1800 / 1900 - SIM 1 & SIM 2; 3G: HSDPA 850 / 900 / 1700 / 1900 / 2100 - UL00; HSDPA 800 / 850 / 900 / 1700 / 1800 / 1900 / 2100 - L09; 4G: LTE band 1(2100), 3(1800), 4(1700/2100), 7(2600), 38(2600), 39(1900), 40(2300), 41(2500) - UL00; LTE band 1(2100), 2(1900), 3(1800), 4(1700/2100), 5(850), 7(2600), 8(900), 12(700), 17(700), 18(800), 19(800), 20(800), 25(1900), 26(850), 28(700), 40(2300) - L09
- Model: GRA-ULxx or GRA-Lxx
- Codename: GRACE
- Other: Signal+, WI-FI+
- Website: consumer.huawei.com/minisite/worldwide/p8/

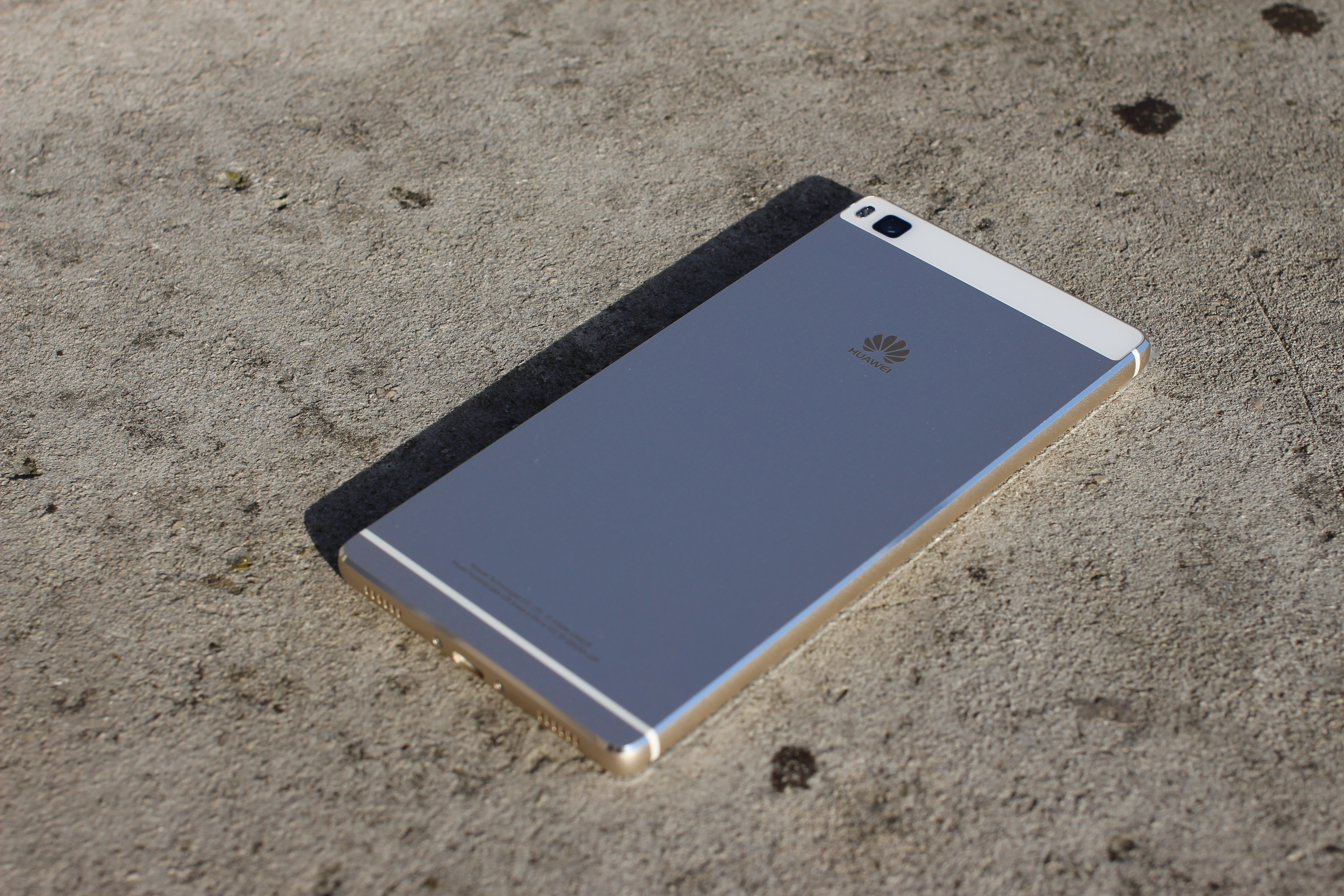
Huawei P8 back-cover

The Huawei P8 is a Huawei P Series high-end Android smartphone produced by Huawei. It was originally released in April 2015, alongside two different versions:

- The Huawei P8 Lite, a cheaper version was also released in 2015. It can be visually distinguished through the location of the rear flashlight, being to the right of the camera lens instead of between the lens and the edge. An updated version was released in 2017 and was built with less processing power and a smaller battery.
- The Huawei P8 Max, a more expensive version. It was built with a larger screen and battery, but otherwise similar to the regular P8.

== Reception ==
Online reviews of the Huawei P8 were positive, highlighting its design and camera but noting some limitations in performance and battery life.

In a review, GSMArena praised the P8's all-metal design and vibrant 5.2-inch Full HD display, calling it sharp and bright. The camera was also well-received for its detail and color accuracy, though its GPU performance lagged behind competitors. GSMArena also stated that the battery life is "hardly a champion", but called it "adequate by today's standards".

Android Authority praised the Huawei P8 for its premium design and vibrant 5.2-inch Full HD display. The 13MP camera with optical image stabilization delivered solid photos, especially in good lighting. Performance was strong for everyday tasks but lagged behind in gaming due to its GPU. Overall, it was seen as a well-balanced mid-range device offering good value.

PhoneArena appreciated the P8's sharp display and good overall performance but noted its struggles with graphically intensive tasks. The 13MP camera performed well in most conditions, though it had limitations in low light. Battery life was decent, but not impressive.

TechRadar highlighted the P8's premium build and vibrant display. While it handled everyday tasks well, the review found its performance lacking in gaming and heavy apps. The camera was good but missed advanced manual controls, and battery life was only average.

Engadget highlighted the P8's 13-megapixel main camera, noting its "best-in-class" features. They emphasized the device's imaging prowess as a key selling point.
