= Journal for Geoclimatic Studies =

Nonexistent journal

The Journal for Geoclimatic Studies is the name given to a nonexistent journal which published a fabricated global warming study in November 2007 entitled, "Carbon dioxide production by benthic bacteria: the death of manmade global warming theory?" The published study identified the Journal for Geoclimatic Studies as an official publication of Okinawa University's Institute for Geoclimatic Studies (The Institute for Geoclimatic Studies is also fraudulent and does not exist). The spurious study, ostensibly authored by Daniel Klein and Mandeep J. Gupta of the University of Arizona's Department of Climatology, and Philip Cooper and Arne FR Jansson at the University of Gothenburg's Department of Atmospheric Physics, claimed that global warming was not human caused, but the work of carbon-dioxide emitting bacteria based on the ocean floor.

The report was circulated by a number of global warming deniers before discovery that the study authors and university departments identified in the publication did not exist. The website where the study was published was taken down once the deception was revealed, and its ownership was traced to David Thorpe, a science journalist and web designer based in the United Kingdom. The true author of the article is purportedly a man identifying himself as Mark Cox, who has claimed the hoax was designed to expose the gullibility and scientific illiteracy of global warming deniers.
