= Lazarus Rising: A Personal and Political Autobiography =

Memoirs of former Australian prime minister John Howard

Lazarus Rising: A Personal and Political autobiography
- Cover art for Lazarus Rising
- Author: John Howard
- Genre: Autobiography
- Publisher: HarperCollins
- Publication date: October 2010
- Publication place: Australia
- Media type: Print
- Pages: 711
- ISBN: 978-0-7322-8995-9

Lazarus Rising: A Personal and Political Autobiography is an autobiography of John Howard, the 25th Prime Minister of Australia, who served between 1996 and 2007. Howard was leader of the Liberal Party of Australia between 1985 and 1989, and again between 1995 and 2007.

The use of the term Lazarus is commonly accepted as evidence of Howard's ability to regain leadership of the Liberal Party in 1995, and subsequently become Prime Minister the following year, in spite of earlier defeats. Howard first used the term in a press conference held in May 1989, after his loss as leader, where he said that the idea of him returning to the leadership was "Lazarus with a triple by-pass".

== Synopsis ==
Lazarus Rising is a personal memoir and covers Howard's life from his early childhood years, aged about 10, through to his four terms as Prime Minister of Australia, and defeat at the 2007 federal election, also losing his seat of Bennelong. Published by HarperCollins and released in October 2010, the 711-page book drew significant controversy in his criticism of his longstanding deputy, Peter Costello, and both Nick Minchin and Jeff Kennett.

== Reception ==
Howard used the memoir to settle some personal scores, calling Costello "an elitist, who's unable to connect to ordinary Australians" and accused Costello of bungling the leadership handover issue. Costello responded by claiming that Howard "appears to be incapable of taking responsibility for the defeat of the government and for losing his seat of Bennelong." Former Liberal leader Dr John Hewson said Costello "never had the balls to challenge Howard." A former Labor powerbroker, Graham Richardson commented that "the situation of Howard and Costello was similar to that of Labor prime minister Bob Hawke and his deputy Paul Keating."

Nick Minchin responded to criticism from John Howard for reportedly telling a meeting in 2006 that Work Choices did not go far enough. Howard claimed that the speech leaked and that Senator Minchin had been naive, broken cabinet solidarity and "worst of all, had played into the hands of the Labor Party." Minchin responded by calling Howard's criticism "unfair and unwarranted."

Howard's criticism of Kennett included a statement that "Kennett's government had gone soft on the Maritime Union of Australia during the 1998 waterfront dispute."

In an interview with both John and Janette Howard, Howard speaks about writing the book and some of the central points. Reviewing the memoirs in The Australian, Janet Albrechtsen rated them "nine out of ten", stating that "it's a shame John Howard used his memoirs to settle personal scores with Peter Costello." Reviewed in PSNews, a journal of the Public Service Association of NSW, the memoirs "provides valuable insight into how personalities interact, the conflicts, compromises and the resulting impact on creating government policy." Reviewed in the politically incorrect The Independent Australian, journalist Alan Fitzgerald focused on what was left out of Howard's memoirs, such as the 2001 appointment of Peter Hollingworth as Governor-General, and his resignation less than two years later. Meanwhile, in Quadrant, an Australian social and political journal, summarised what it took to be the typical reviews of Howard's memoirs from the left-wing commentariat:

Jack Waterford in The Canberra Times finds Howard's memoir "fairly boring" and "cobbled together" from old speeches. Tony Walker in The Australian Financial Review considers it "interesting, if self serving". Virginia Trioli, interviewing Howard on the ... ABC morning show, appeared exasperated at his apparent lack of "doubt" when making controversial decisions....the editor of the Australian Spectator thinks the autobiography has "tarnished" Howard's "legacy", whilst in the same journal Peter Coleman deems Howard's assessment of Peter Costello "unworthy".

Howard was advanced A$400,000 by the publisher against a print run of 50,000 copies. It was claimed that the book was on remainder shelves at the reduced price of A$29.95; and a newspaper was giving away copies with subscriptions. However, by August 2011 the same newspaper reported that sales of the hardback edition exceeded 75,000 and a paperback edition was about to be released, pushing total expected sales up to 100,000.
