= Climate Change and Emissions Management Amendment Act =

The Climate Change and Emissions Management Amendment Act of Alberta was the first law of its type to impose greenhouse gas cuts on large industrial facilities.

Starting from July 1, 2007, Alberta facilities that emit more than 100,000 tonnes of greenhouse gases per year will be required to reduce their emissions intensity by 12% under the Climate Change and Emissions Management Amendment Act.

Companies have three ways to meet their reductions: they can make operating improvements, buy an Alberta-based credit, or contribute to the Climate Change and Emissions Management Fund.

The regulations apply to about 100 large facilities which emit more than 100,000 tonnes of greenhouse gases a year. Those facilities account for about 70% of Alberta's industrial greenhouse gas emissions.

The annual cost of compliance is estimated to be $177 million - or less than one-tenth of one per cent of Alberta's nominal GDP ($242 billion in 2006).

== Alberta-based credits ==
A facility can purchase credits from large emitters that have reduced their emissions intensity beyond their 12 per cent target. They can also purchase credits from facilities whose emissions are below the 100,000-tonne threshold but are voluntarily reducing their emissions. The projects must have legitimate greenhouse gas reductions in the province.

== Climate Change and Emissions Management Fund ==
A third option would be for companies to pay $15 for every tonne over their reduction target. The money will be put into the Climate Change and Emissions Management Fund, which will be directed to strategic projects or transformative technology aimed at reducing greenhouse gas emissions in the province.

According to the Climate Change and Emissions Management Amendment Act, funds may be used only for purposes related to reducing emissions of specified gases or improving Alberta's ability to adapt to climate change; including without limitation, the following purposes:

- energy conservation and energy efficiency;
- demonstration and use of new technologies that emphasize reductions in specified gas emissions in the discovery, recovery, processing, * transportation and use of Alberta's energy resources;
- demonstration and use of new technologies that emphasize reductions in specified gas emissions through the use of alternative energy and renewable energy sources;
- demonstration and use of specified gas capture, use and storage technology;
- development of opportunities for removal of specified gases from the atmosphere through sequestration by sinks;
- measurement of the natural removal and storage of carbon;
- climate change adaptation programs and measures;
- paying salaries, fees, expenses, liabilities or other costs incurred by a delegated authority in carrying out a duty or function of or exercising a power of the Minister in respect of the Fund that has been delegated to the delegated authority, if authorized by the regulations.
