= P8 Group =

The P8 Group brings together senior leaders from some of the world's largest public pension funds to develop actions relating to global issues and particularly climate change. It is an initiative of the Cambridge Programme for Sustainability Leadership (CPSL) and HRH Prince of Wales’s Business and Environment Programme (BEP) supported by the Environmental Capital Group (ECG) and the Nand & Jeet Khemka Foundation.

The P8 Group involves ten leading global pension funds and sovereign wealth funds, including representatives from Europe, Asia, Australasia and North America. They represent over $3 trillion of investment capital and as pension funds have an inherently long term focus.

In November 2007 the first P8 Summit was held. This brought together leaders from eight of the world's largest public pension funds with key experts including Vice President Al Gore and HRH Prince of Wales. The P8 Summit was a critical start in getting pension funds to lead in the move toward a low-carbon economy. Participants agreed to continue working together to address climate change, both within their organizations and as a group to influence policy and markets.

The group, at this point 10 pension funds, met again in July 2008 to further develop their strategy. At this meeting HRH Prince of Wales welcomed their continued "determination to put substantial money into investments that address climate change."

This organisation has now disbanded, and was replaced in 2010 by the P80 Group Foundation.

== Members of P8 ==
- CalPERS
- CalSTRS
- New York State
- British Columbia
- AP7
- APG
- UK Universities Superannuation Scheme (USS)
- ACSI
- Korean National Pension Fund
- Norwegian Sovereign Wealth Fund

== See also ==
- Bali roadmap
