= Sydney Declaration =

Environmental protection agreement

The Sydney APEC Leaders' Declaration on Climate Change, Energy Security and Clean Development was adopted at APEC Australia 2007 on 8 September 2007.

The agreement indicates the wish of signatories to work towards aspirational goals on energy efficiency per unit of GDP while encouraging forest cover in the region. The APEC wide regional aspirational goal is to reduce energy intensity by at least 25 percent by 2030 from the 2005 level, and set an APEC-wide regional goal of increasing forest cover in the region by 200,000 square kilometres by 2020.

== Criticism ==
Environmental and climate organisations such as Greenpeace, the Australian Conservation Foundation and the Climate Action Network criticised the agreement for not setting binding targets on greenhouse gas emissions for developed countries, and that the statement was little more than a political stunt.

Greenpeace pointed out that Foreign Minister Alexander Downer told an APEC lecture in Melbourne in April 2007 that aspirational targets are a "political stunt" and "not a real target at all". One Greenpeace spokesperson said the declaration should be named the "Sydney Distraction" on climate change.

The Australian Conservation Foundation called the declaration "very weak" and said the "declaration does not advance global discussions on climate change."
