= Huawei P Smart Pro =

2019 smartphone model

Huawei P Smart Pro (Huawei Y9s) Huawei Enjoy 10 Plus
- Brand: Huawei
- Manufacturer: Huawei
- Type: Smartphone
- Series: P Smart/Y
- Family: P
- First released: Enjoy 10 Plus: September 5, 2019; 6 years ago P Smart Pro: November 14, 2019; 6 years ago
- Predecessor: Huawei P Smart Z Huawei Y9 2019
- Successor: Huawei Y9a
- Related: Huawei P Smart S Huawei P Smart Z Huawei Y6s; Huawei Y8s; Huawei Enjoy 10; Huawei Enjoy 10e Honor 9X
- Compatible networks: GSM, 3G, 4G (LTE)
- Form factor: Monoblock
- Colors: Midnight Black, Breathing Crystal, Phantom Purple (Y9s only)
- Dimensions: P Smart Pro & Y9s: 163.1 × 77.2 × 8.8 mm Enjoy 10 Plus: 163.5 × 77.3 × 8.8 mm
- Weight: P Smart Pro & Y9s: 206 g Enjoy 10 Plus: 163.5 g
- Operating system: Original: Android 9 Pie + EMUI 9.1; Current: P Smart Pro/Y9s: Android 10 + EMUI 12; Enjoy 10 Plus: HarmonyOS 3
- CPU: Kirin 710F (12 nm), Octa-core (4×2.2 GHz Cortex-A73 & 4×1.7 GHz Cortex-A53)
- GPU: Mali-G51 MP4
- Memory: P Smart Pro & Y9s: 6 GB; Enjoy 10 Plus: 4/6/8 GB; LPDDR4
- Storage: 128 GB, UFS 2.1
- Removable storage: MicroSDXC up to 512 GB
- Battery: Non-removable, Li-Po 4000 mAh
- Rear camera: 48 MP, f/1.8, 26 mm (wide-angle), 1/2.0", 0.8 μm, PDAF + 8 MP, f/2.4, 13 mm (ultrawide) + 2 MP, f/2.4, (depth sensor); LED flash, HDR, panorama Video: 1080p@30fps
- Front camera: Pop-up; 16 MP, f/2.2 HDR; Video: 1080p@60fps
- Display: LTPS LCD, 6.59", 2340 × 1080 (FullHD+), 19.5:9, 391 ppi
- Sound: Video: 3gp, mp4
- Connectivity: USB-C 2.0, 3.5 mm Audio Jack, Bluetooth 4.2 (A2DP, LE), FM radio, Wi-Fi 802.11 b/g/n (Wi-Fi Direct, hotspot), Wi-Fi 802.11 a/b/g/n/ac (dual-band, Wi-Fi Direct, hotspot) (Enjoy 10 Plus in STK-AL00 model), GPS, A-GPS, GLONASS, BDS
- Data inputs: Fingerprint scanner (side-mounted (P Smart Pro & Y9s) / rear-mounted (Enjoy 10 Plus)), proximity sensor, accelerometer, gyroscope, compass

The Huawei P Smart Pro (stylized as HUAWEI P smart Pro) is a mid-range smartphone developed by Huawei. It was launched officially in Ukraine on November 14, 2019. In some countries, the smartphone was introduced as Huawei Y9s. In the People's Republic of China, a similar model, the Huawei Enjoy 10 Plus, primarily differs in the placement of the fingerprint scanner.

== Design ==
The screen is made of glass. The back panel and side frame has a plastic .

On the bottom, there is a USB-C port, a speaker, a microphone, and a 3.5 mm audio jack. On the top, there is a retractable front camera module, a second microphone, and a slot for two SIM cards and a MicroSD memory card up to 512 GB. On the right side, there are volume buttons and the power button, which integrates a fingerprint scanner in the P Smart Pro. In the Enjoy 10 Plus, the fingerprint scanner is located on the rear panel.

The Huawei P Smart Pro was sold in 2 color options: Midnight Black and Breathing Crystal.

The Huawei Y9s was sold in 3 color options: Midnight Black, Breathing Crystal, and Phantom Purple.

In China, the Huawei Enjoy 10 Plus was sold in 4 colors: Magic Night Black, Gradient (blue), Red Tea Orange, and Emerald.

== Technical specifications ==
=== Hardware ===
Both smartphones are powered by the Kirin 710F processor and Mali-G51 MP4 GPU. The battery has a capacity of 4000 mAh.

Both smartphones features a 6.59-inch LTPS LCD with a FullHD+ (2340 × 1080) resolution, 393 ppi pixel density, and a 19.5:9 aspect ratio.

The P Smart Pro was sold in a 6/128 GB configuration. The Enjoy 10 Plus was available in 4/128, 6/128, and 8/128 GB configurations.

=== Camera ===
The smartphones feature a 48 MP triple main camera: f/1.8 (wide-angle) + 8 MP, f/2.4 (ultrawide-angle) + 2 MP, f/2.4 (depth sensor), with phase autofocus and 1080p@30fps video recording capability. The front camera has a pop-up mechanism, 16 MP resolution, f/2.2 aperture, and 1080p@60fps video recording capability.

=== Software ===
Both smartphones were released on EMUI 9.1 based on Android 9 Pie. The Huawei P Smart Pro and Y9s were updated to EMUI 12 based on Android 10, while the Huawei Enjoy 10 Plus was updated to HarmonyOS 3.

== See also ==
- Huawei Mate 30
- Samsung Galaxy A70s
- OnePlus 7T
