= Huawei Nova Y61 =

LTE Android smartphones

Huawei Nova Y61 / Y62 / Y62 Plus (EVE-LX9 / EVE-LX9N, EVE-LX3) (Huawei Enjoy 50z (EVE-AL00) in China)
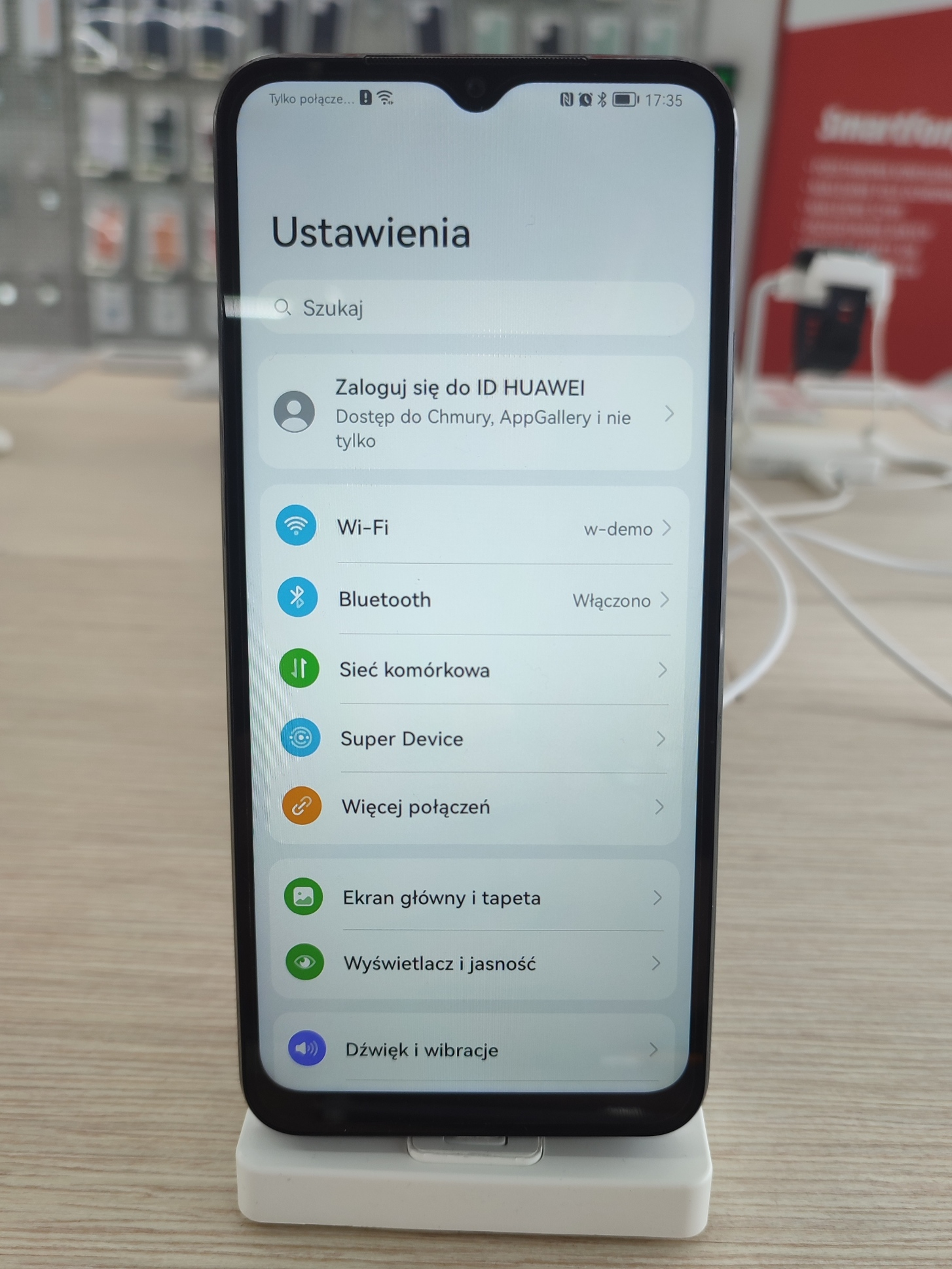
- Front of the Huawei Nova Y61
- Also known as: Huawei Y62/Y62 Plus (South Africa)
- Brand: Huawei
- Manufacturer: Huawei
- Type: Phablet
- Series: Nova / Enjoy
- First released: Nova Y61: November 1, 2022; 3 years ago Enjoy 50z: December 9, 2022; 3 years ago Nova Y62 / Y62 Plus: December 2023; 2 years ago
- Availability by region: Nova Y61: Worldwide; Nova Y62 / Y62 Plus: South Africa; Enjoy 50z: China
- Predecessor: Huawei Nova Y60; Huawei Enjoy 20e
- Successor: Huawei Nova Y63; Huawei Enjoy 70z
- Related: Huawei Nova Y71; Huawei Enjoy 50; Huawei Nova Y91; Huawei Nova Y72; Huawei Enjoy 50 Pro
- Compatible networks: GSM, 3G, 4G LTE
- Form factor: Slate
- Colors: Nova Y61 / Enjoy 50z: Midnight Black, Sapphire Blue, Mint Green; Nova Y62 / Y62 Plus: Midnight Black, Sapphire Blue
- Dimensions: 164.28×75.8×8.94 mm (6.468×2.984×0.352 in)
- Weight: 188 g (7 oz)
- Operating system: Nova Y61 / Y62 / Y62 Plus: Android 11 (no Google Play Services), EMUI 12; Enjoy 50z: HarmonyOS 2.0
- System-on-chip: Huawei HiSilicon KIRIN 710
- CPU: Octa-core; 4x ARM Cortex A73 @ 2.2GHz and 4x ARM Cortex A53 @ 1.7GHz
- GPU: Mali-G51 MP4
- Memory: Nova Y61: 4 / 6 GB; Nova Y62: 4 GB; Nova Y62 Plus: 8 GB; Enjoy 50z: 6 / 8 GB; LPDDR4X
- Storage: Nova Y61: 64 GB; Nova Y62 / Y62 Plus: 128 GB; Enjoy 50z: 128 / 256 GB eMMC 5.1
- Removable storage: microSDXC up to 512 GB
- SIM: Dual SIM
- Battery: Non-removable Li-Po 5000 mAh
- Charging: 22.5W Huawei SuperCharge
- Rear camera: 50 MP, f/1.8, 26mm (wide), AF + 2 MP, f/2.4 (macro) + 2 MP, f/2.4 (depth); LED flash, HDR, panorama Video: 1080p@30fps
- Front camera: 5 MP, f/2.2 (wide); Video: 1080p@30fps
- Display: IPS LCD, 6.52", 1600 × 720 (HD+), 20:9, 269 ppi
- Sound: Loudspeaker, 3.5 mm jack
- Media: Audio: MP3, MIDI, AWB, MP4, M4A, 3GP, Ogg, AMR, AAC, FLAC, WAV, MKV; Video: 3GP, MP4, WebM, MKV
- Connectivity: USB-C 2.0, Bluetooth 5.1 (A2DP, LE), NFC (Nova Y61 EVE-LX9N), Wi-Fi 802.11 a/b/g/n/ac (dual-band), GPS, A-GPS, GLONASS, Galileo, BeiDou, QZSS
- Codename: Everlyn
- Made in: China
- Other: Fingerprint (side-mounted), proximity sensor, accelerometer, compass

The Huawei Nova Y61 is an entry-level smartphone developed by Huawei. It was announced on November 1, 2022, as the successor to the Huawei Nova Y60.

On December 9, 2022, the Huawei Enjoy 50z was introduced in China; it is a rebranded Huawei Nova Y61 with higher memory configurations. In December 2023, Huawei introduced the Huawei Nova Y62 and Huawei Nova Y62 Plus in South Africa, which differ from the Nova Y61 by offering more memory and removing the Mint Green color option. The Nova Y62 and Y62 Plus differ from each other only in the amount of RAM.

== Design ==
=== Appearance ===
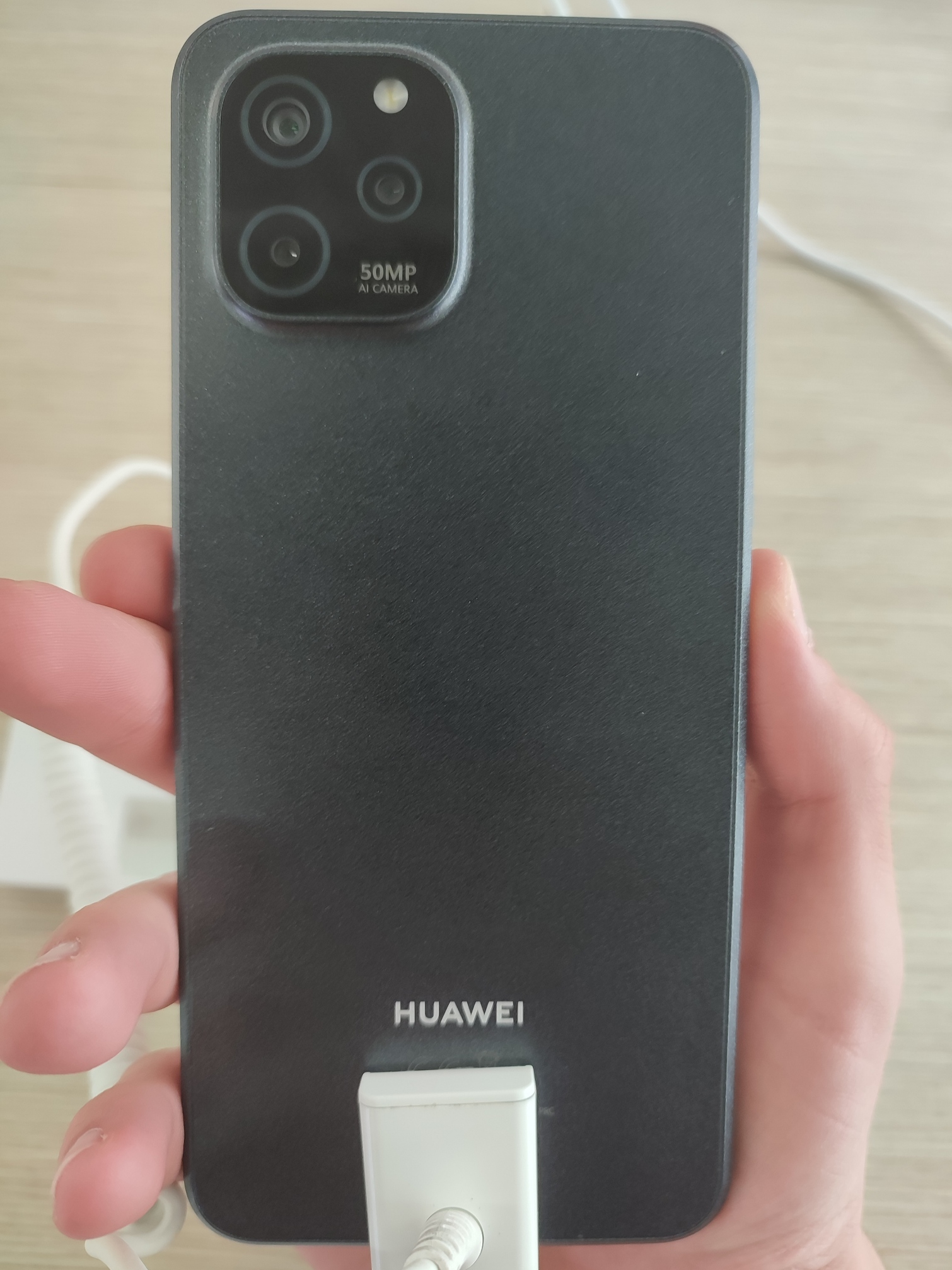
Rear panel of the Huawei Nova Y61 in Midnight Black

The screen is made of glass, while the back panel and frame are constructed from matte plastic with a touch of ceramic finish.

The camera module design resembles the Pro models of the iPhone.

The bottom features a USB-C port, a microphone, and a 3.5 mm audio jack. The top houses a speaker and a second microphone. The left side contains a slot for two SIM cards and a microSD card up to 512 GB. The right side features the volume rocker and a power button with an integrated fingerprint scanner.

=== Color options ===
- The Huawei Nova Y61 and Enjoy 50z were sold in three colors: Midnight Black, Sapphire Blue, and Mint Green.
- The Huawei Nova Y62 and Y62 Plus were only available in the first two colors.

== Technical specifications ==
=== Hardware ===
All models were equipped with a Kirin 710 chipset and a Mali-G51 GPU. It also has an octa-core CPU with four ARM Cortex-A73 processors @ 2.2GHz and four ARM Cortex-A53 processors @ 1.7GHz.

The Huawei Nova Y61 was sold in 4/64 GB and 6/64 GB configurations. The Nova Y62 comes with 4/128 GB, the Nova Y62 Plus with 8/128 GB, and the Enjoy 50z with 6/128 GB, 6/256 GB, and 8/256 GB.

The battery has a capacity of 5000 mAh and supports 22.5W fast charging.

All models feature a 6.52-inch IPS LCD with HD+ resolution (1600 × 720), a pixel density of 269 ppi, a 20:9 aspect ratio, and a waterdrop notch for the front camera.

The smartphones feature an AI triple rear camera setup consisting of a 50 MP wide lens with f/1.8 aperture and PDAF, a 2 MP macro lens, and a 2 MP depth sensor (both with f/2.4). The front-facing camera is 5 MP with an f/2.2 aperture. Both the front and rear cameras can record video at 1080p@30fps.

=== Software ===
The Huawei Nova Y61, Y62, and Y62 Plus models run on EMUI 12, which is based on Android 11 but lacks Google Play Services. The Huawei Enjoy 50z runs on HarmonyOS 2.0.

Preceded by Huawei Nova Y60	Huawei Nova Y61; 2022	Succeeded by Huawei Nova Y62/Plus
Preceded by Huawei Nova Y61	Huawei Nova Y62/Plus; 2023	Succeeded by Huawei Nova Y63
Preceded by Huawei Enjoy 20e	Huawei Enjoy 50z 2022	Succeeded by Huawei Enjoy 70z
