= Honor Play 20 =

2021 Smartphone

Honor Play 20 Honor Play 20a Honor Play 5T
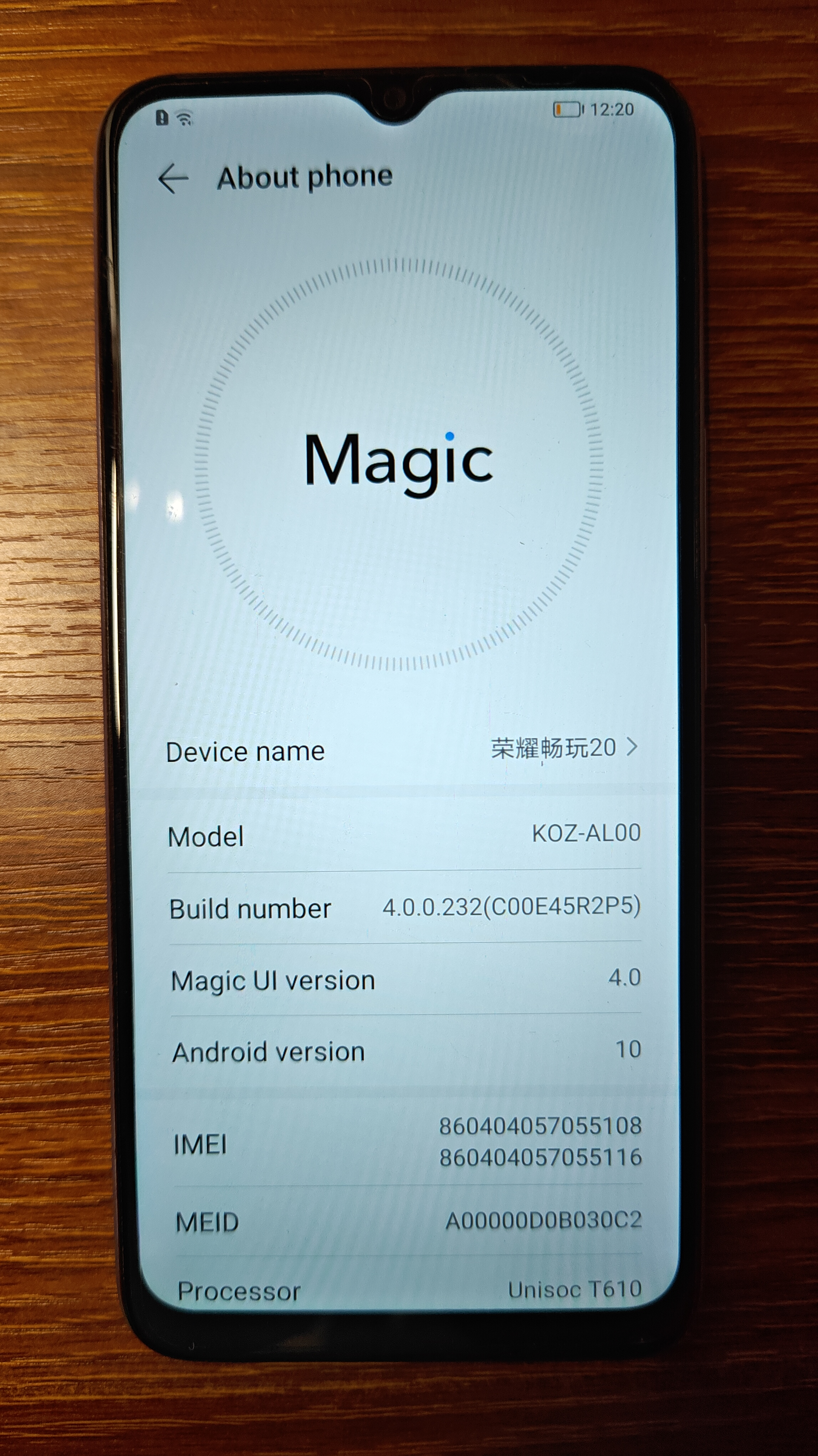
- Manufacturer: Honor
- Type: Phablet
- Series: Play
- First released: Play 20: April 26, 2021; 5 years ago Play 5T: May 2021; 5 years ago Play 20a: September 30, 2022; 3 years ago
- Availability by region: China
- Predecessor: Honor Play 9A
- Successor: Honor Play 30
- Related: Honor Play 20 Pro; Honor Play 5T Pro; Honor Play 5T Youth
- Compatible networks: GSM, 3G, LTE
- Form factor: Slate
- Dimensions: 163.93×75.79×8.95 mm (6.454×2.984×0.352 in)
- Weight: 198 g (7 oz)
- Operating system: Play 20/5T: Android 10 with Magic UI 4.0 (no Google Play Services); Play 20a: Android 12 with Magic UI 6.1 (no Google Play Services)
- System-on-chip: Play 20/5T: Unisoc T610 (12 nm); Play 20a: MediaTek Helio G85 (12 nm)
- CPU: Play 20/5T: Octa-core (2×1.8 GHz Cortex-A75 & 6×1.8 GHz Cortex-A55); Play 20a: Octa-core (2×2 GHz Cortex-A75 & 6×1.8 GHz Cortex-A55)
- GPU: Play 20/5T: Mali-G52 MP2; Play 20a: Mali-G52 MC2
- Memory: Play 20: 4/6/8 GB; Play 20a: 6 GB; Play 5T: 8 GB
- Storage: Play 20: 64/128 GB; Play 20a/5T: 128 GB eMMC 5.1
- Removable storage: microSDXC up to 512 GB
- SIM: Hybrid Dual SIM (Nano-SIM)
- Battery: Non-removable Li-Po 5000 mAh
- Charging: 10 W
- Rear camera: 13 MP, f/1.8 (wide), PDAF + 2 MP, f/2.4, (depth); LED flash, HDR, panorama Video: 1080p@30fps
- Front camera: 5 MP, f/2.2 (wide); HDR; Video: 1080p@30fps
- Display: IPS LCD, 6.52", 1600 × 720 (HD+), 20:9 ratio, 269 ppi
- Sound: Mono speaker
- Connectivity: USB-C 2.0, 3.5 mm jack, Bluetooth 5.0 (A2DP, LE), FM radio, Wi-Fi 802.11 b/g/n, GPS, A-GPS, BeiDou
- Data inputs: Fingerprint (rear-mounted on Play 5T), proximity, accelerometer, compass
- Model: Play 20: KOZ-AL00; Play 20a: KOZ-AL00CM; Play 5T: KOZ-AL40
- Codename: Play 20: Konstanze; Play 5T: Konstanze B Play 20a: Konstanze C
- Website: Official website (Honor Play 20); Official website (Honor Play 20a); Official website (Honor Play 5T)

The Honor Play 20 is an entry-level smartphone developed by Honor. It was announced on April 26, 2021, and is the successor to the Honor Play 9A.

In May 2021, the Honor Play 5T was introduced, which differs from the Honor Play 20 by the presence of a fingerprint scanner, the design of the camera module, the absence of a white color option, and the availability of only an 8/128 GB configuration.

Additionally, on September 30, 2022, the Honor Play 20a was announced, which differs from the Honor Play 20 in its processor, the absence of a white color option, and being available only in a 6/128 GB configuration.

== Specifications ==
=== Design ===
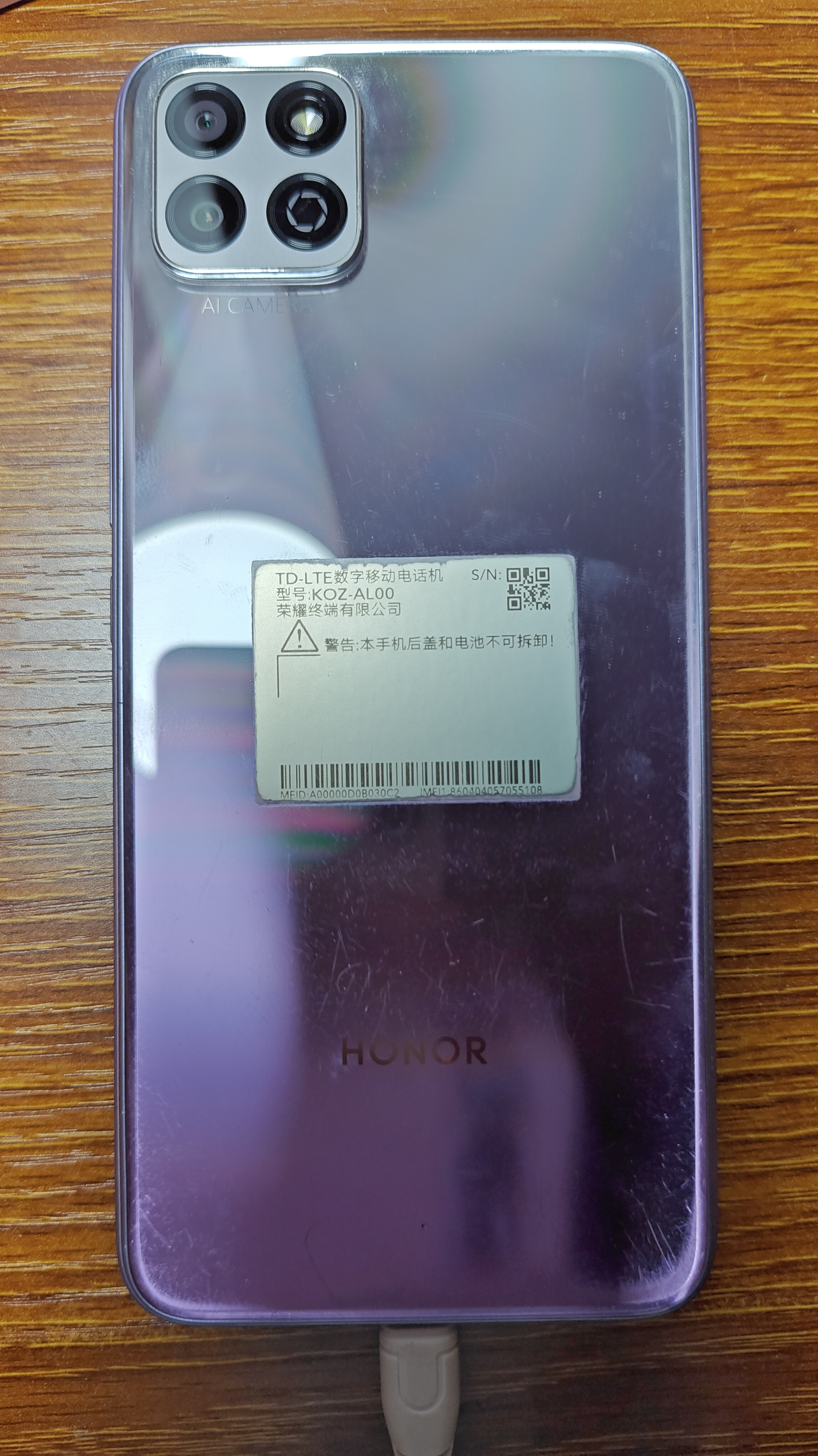
Back of the Honor Play 20 in Titanium Silver

The screen is made of glass, while the body is made of glossy plastic.

On the bottom, there is a USB-C port, a speaker, a microphone, and a 3.5 mm audio jack. A second microphone is located at the top. On the left side, there is a hybrid slot for two SIM cards or one SIM card and a microSD memory card up to 512 GB. The volume buttons and the power button are located on the right side. The Honor Play 5T also features a fingerprint scanner on the back panel.

The Honor Play 20 was sold in four colors: Aurora Blue, Magic Night Black, Titanium Silver (silver-pink), and Iceland White, while the Honor Play 5T and Play 20a feature the same color options except for Iceland White.

=== Platform ===
The Honor Play 20 and Play 5T are powered by the Unisoc T610 processor with a Mali-G52 MP2 GPU, while the Play 20a uses the MediaTek Helio G85 with a Mali-G52 MC2 GPU.

=== Battery ===
The battery has a capacity of 5000 mAh.

=== Cameras ===
The smartphones feature a dual rear camera setup: 13 MP, f/1.8 with phase detection autofocus (wide) + 2 MP, f/2.4 (depth sensor), and a front camera: 5 MP, f/2.2 (wide). Both the main and front cameras can record video in 1080p resolution at 30fps.

=== Display ===
The display is an IPS LCD, 6.52", HD+ (1600 × 720) with a pixel density of 269 ppi, a 20:9 aspect ratio, and a waterdrop notch for the front camera.

=== Memory ===
The Honor Play 20 was sold in 4/64, 4/128, 6/128, and 8/128 GB configurations, the Play 20a in 6/128 GB, and the Play 5T in 8/128 GB.

=== Software ===
The Honor Play 20 and Play 5T run Magic UI 4.0 based on Android 10, while the Play 20a runs Magic UI 6.1 based on Android 12. None of the models include Google Play Services, and they use Honor's own app store for software installation.
