= Huawei P Smart Z =

Smartphone by Huawei

Huawei P Smart Z Huawei Y9 Prime 2019
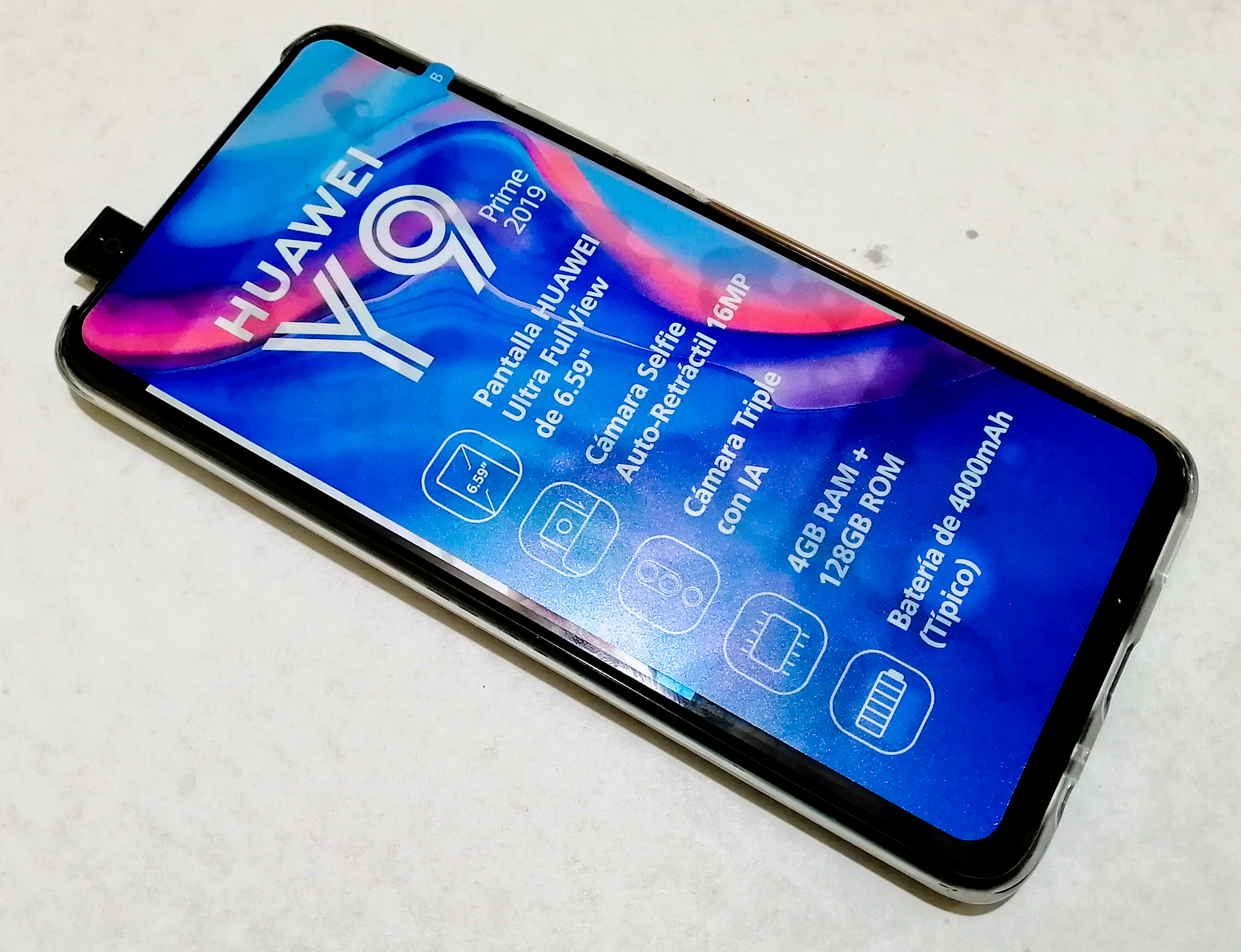
- Huawei Y9 Prime 2019
- Brand: Huawei
- Type: Phablet
- Series: P Smart/Y
- Family: P
- First released: P Smart Z: May 8, 2019; 7 years ago Y9 Prime 2019: August 1, 2019; 6 years ago
- Successor: Huawei P Smart Pro
- Related: Huawei P Smart 2019; Huawei P Smart+ 2019; Huawei P Smart Pro; Huawei Y9 2019; Huawei Y6 2019; Huawei Y7 2019; Honor 9X
- Compatible networks: GSM, 3G, 4G (LTE)
- Form factor: Slate
- Colors: Emerald Green, Midnight Black, Sapphire Blue
- Dimensions: H: 163.5 mm W: 77.3 mm D: 8.8 mm
- Weight: 196.8 g (7 oz)
- Operating system: Original: Android 9 Pie + EMUI 9.0; Current: Android 10 + EMUI 12
- System-on-chip: Kirin 710F (12 nm)
- CPU: Octa-core (4×2.2 GHz Cortex-A73 & 4×1.7 GHz Cortex-A53)
- GPU: Mali-G51 MP4
- Memory: 4 GB LPDDR4X
- Storage: P Smart Z: 64 GB; Y9 Prime 2019: 64/128 GB eMMC 5.1
- Removable storage: microSDXC up to 512 GB
- SIM: Nano-SIM or Dual SIM (Nano-SIM)
- Battery: Non-removable Li-Ion 4000 mAh
- Charging: 10 W
- Rear camera: Wide: 16 MP, f/1.8, PDAF; Ultra-wide: P Smart Z: None; Y9 Prime 2019: 8 MP, f/2.4, 13 mm; Depth: 2 MP, f/2.4 LED flash, panorama, HDR; Video: 1080p@30fps
- Front camera: Motorized pop-up 16 MP, f/2.0 HDR; Video: 1080p@30fps
- Display: IPS LCD, 6.59", 2340 × 1080 (FHD+), 19.5:9, 391 ppi
- Sound: Mono speaker
- Connectivity: USB-C 2.0, 3.5 mm jack, Bluetooth 5.0 (A2DP, LE), NFC (region dependent for P Smart Z), FM radio, Wi-Fi 802.11 a/b/g/n/ac (dual-band, Wi-Fi Direct), GPS (A-GPS), GLONASS, BeiDou, QZSS (Y9 Prime 2019)
- Data inputs: Fingerprint (rear-mounted), accelerometer, gyroscope, proximity, compass
- Codename: Stockholm A

The Huawei P Smart Z is a mid-range smartphone from the "P" series, announced by Huawei on May 8, 2019. Its main feature is a motorized pop-up camera mechanism, which is Huawei's first pop-up front camera and allowed for a full-screen design with slim bezels and no notches.

On August 1, 2019, the Huawei Y9 Prime 2019 was introduced, differing from the Huawei P Smart Z by the inclusion of an ultra-wide-angle lens and the absence of NFC.

It was initially launched in June 2019 in international markets. The Huawei Y9 Prime was launched in Philippine markets on July 1, 2019. Preorders runs from July 5 to 12.

== Technical specifications ==
=== Design & Build ===
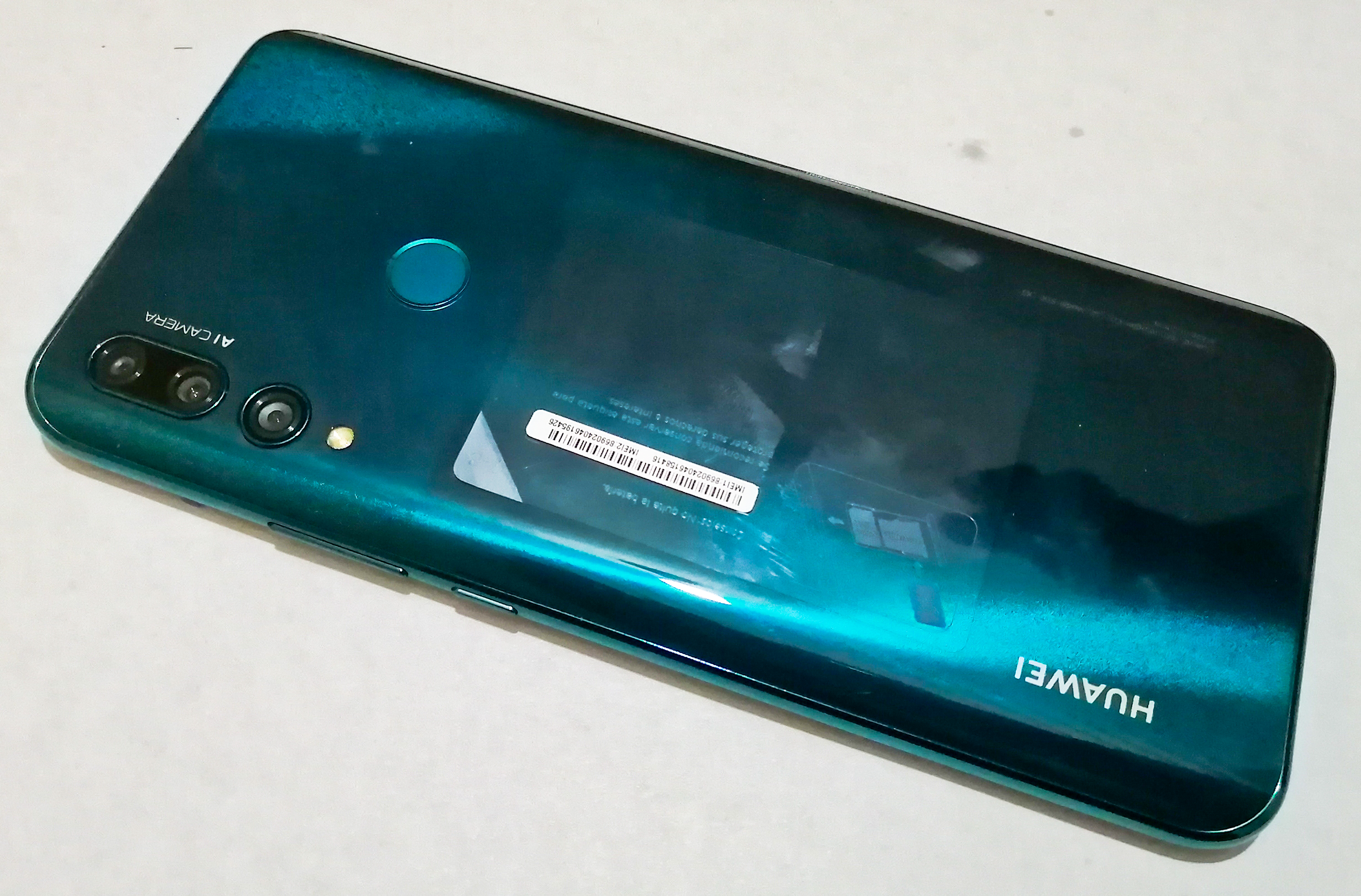
Rear view of the Huawei Y9 Prime 2019 in Emerald Green

The back panel and frame are made of glossy plastic, while the front is covered with 2.5D glass.

It measure the dimensions at 77.3 mm of width, 163.5 mm of height, 8.8 mm of thickness, and weights at about 196.8 g. Aspect ratio is 19.5:9.

The bottom houses a 3.5 mm audio jack, microphone, USB-C port, and speaker. The top features the pop-up front camera, a hybrid slot for 2 SIM cards or 1 SIM and a memory card (depending on the model), and a second microphone. The right side contains the volume rocker and power button. The fingerprint scanner is located on the rear panel.

The smartphones were released in three colors: Midnight Black, Emerald Green, and Sapphire Blue.

=== Hardware ===
The smartphones are built on the octa-core HiSilicon Kirin 710F, which includes four Cortex-A73 cores (64-bit) at 2.2 GHz and four Cortex-A53 cores (64-bit) at 1.7 GHz. The GPU is the ARM Mali-G51 MP4. Internal storage for the P Smart Z is 64 GB, while the Y9 Prime 2019 offers 64 GB or 128 GB depending on the configuration. Storage is expandable up to 512 GB. It features 4 GB of RAM.

The devices are equipped with a 4000 mAh lithium-ion battery with standard USB Type-C 2.0 10-watt charging.

The display is a 6.59" LTPS IPS LCD, Full HD+ (2340 × 1080) with a pixel density of 391 ppi and a 19.5:9 aspect ratio.

The Huawei P Smart Z features a dual rear camera system with a 16 MP main lens (f/1.8 aperture, PDAF) and a 2 MP depth sensor (f/2.4). The Huawei Y9 Prime 2019 adds an 8 MP ultra-wide lens (f/2.4). Both smartphones have a 16 MP motorized pop-up front camera (f/2.0). Both the front and rear cameras can record video at 1080p@30fps. Wireless interfaces include Wi-Fi 802.11 b/g/n/ac (2.4/5 GHz), Bluetooth 5.0 (A2DP, LE), and NFC. Navigation systems supported include GPS, A-GPS, GLONASS, and BeiDou.

=== Software & UI updates ===
The smartphones were launched with Android 9 Pie and the EMUI 9.0 User Interface. It received multiple UI updates:

Software update
Date	OS	UI
December 2019	Android 10	EMUI 10 beta
February 2020	Android 10	EMUI 10 official
August 2022	Android 10	EMUI 12 (latest)
