= Huawei Nova Y60 =

Android smartphones developed by Huawei & Honor

Huawei Nova Y60 Huawei Enjoy 20 Honor Play 5T Youth
- Brand: Huawei; Honor
- Manufacturers: Huawei; Honor
- Type: Phablet
- Series: Huawei Nova / Enjoy; Honor Play
- First released: Enjoy 20: September 3, 2020; 5 years ago Honor Play 5T Youth: April 20, 2021; 5 years ago Nova Y60: August 26, 2021; 4 years ago
- Availability by region: Nova Y60: Worldwide; Enjoy 20 / Honor Play 5T Youth: China
- Predecessor: Huawei Y6p; Huawei Enjoy 10
- Successor: Huawei Nova Y61; Huawei Enjoy 50
- Related: Huawei Nova Y70; Huawei Nova Y90; Huawei Enjoy 20 Plus; Huawei Enjoy 20 Pro; Huawei Enjoy 20 SE; Honor Play 5T; Honor Play 5T Pro
- Compatible networks: GSM, 3G, 4G (LTE), 5G (Enjoy 20)
- Form factor: Slate
- Colors: Nova Y60: Crush Green, Midnight Black; Enjoy 20: Dawn Gold, Sakura Snow Clear Sky, Beautiful Forest, Bright Black; Honor Play 5T Youth: Black, Blue
- Dimensions: 165.2×76×9.2 mm (6.50×2.99×0.36 in)
- Weight: Nova Y60: 185 g Enjoy 20: 188 g Honor Play 5T Youth: 191 g
- Operating system: Nova Y60: Android 10 without Google Play Services, EMUI 11; Enjoy 20: Original: Android 10 without Google Play Services, EMUI 10.1; Current: HarmonyOS 3 Honor Play 5T Youth: Android 10 without Google Play Services, Magic UI 4.0
- System-on-chip: Nova Y60/Honor Play 5T Youth: MediaTek MT6765 Helio P35 (12 nm); Enjoy 20: MediaTek MT6853V Dimensity 720 (7 nm)
- CPU: Nova Y60/Honor Play 5T Youth: Octa-core (4×2.35 GHz Cortex-A53 & 4×1.8 GHz Cortex-A53); Enjoy 20: Octa-core (2×2.0 GHz Cortex-A76 & 6×2.0 GHz Cortex-A55)
- GPU: Nova Y60/Honor Play 5T Youth: PowerVR GE8320; Enjoy 20: Mali-G57 MC3
- Memory: Nova Y60: 4 GB; Enjoy 20: 6/8 GB; Honor Play 5T Youth: 4/6 GB; LPDDR4X
- Storage: Nova Y60: 64 GB; Enjoy 20: 128 GB; Honor Play 5T Youth: 64/128 GB eMMC 5.1
- Removable storage: microSDXC up to 512 GB
- SIM: Dual SIM
- Battery: Non-removable Li-Po 5000 mAh
- Charging: Nova Y60/Enjoy 20: 10 W Honor Play 5T Youth: 22.5 W fast charging
- Rear camera: Nova Y60/Enjoy 20: 13 MP, f/1.8, 26 mm (wide), PDAF + 5 MP, f/2.2, 120˚ (ultrawide) + 2 MP, f/2.4, (depth); Honor Play 5T Youth: 13 MP, f/1.8, 26 mm (wide), PDAF + 5 MP, f/2.2, 120˚ (ultrawide) + 2 MP, f/2.4, (macro) + 2 MP, f/2.4, (depth); LED flash, HDR, panorama Video: 1080p@30fps
- Front camera: 8 MP, f/2.0 (wide); HDR; Video: 1080p@30fps
- Display: IPS LCD, 6.6", 1600 × 720 (HD+), 20:9, 266 ppi
- Sound: Loudspeaker, earpiece 3.5 mm audio jack
- Media: Audio: MP3, MIDI, AWB, MP4, MP4a, 3gp, Ogg, AMR, AAC, FLAC, WAV, MKV; Video: 3gp, MP4, WebM, MKV
- Connectivity: USB-C 2.0, Bluetooth 5.0 (A2DP, LE), Wi-Fi 802.11 a (Enjoy 20)b/g/n/ac (Enjoy 20) (dual-band (Enjoy 20), Wi-Fi Direct (except Nova Y60), hotspot), GPS, A-GPS, GLONASS, BeiDou
- Other: Fingerprint sensor (side-mounted), proximity sensor, accelerometer
- Website: https://consumer.huawei.com/en/phones/nova-y60/

The Huawei Nova Y60 is an entry-level smartphone developed by Huawei, announced on August 26, 2021, and the successor to the Huawei Y6p.

In China, the Huawei Enjoy 20 was introduced along with the Huawei Enjoy 20 Plus, with 5G support and a Helio P35 chipset.

The Honor Play 5T Youth was developed and announced on April 20, 2021, by Honor, which features a macro camera, fast charging support up to 22.5W, and a same chipset from the Enjoy 20.

The color options differ from the following models:

- Nova Y60: Crush Green and Black
- Enjoy 20: Dawn Gold, Sakura Snow Clear Sky, Beautiful Forest and Bright Black
- Honor Play 5T Youth: Black and Blue

== Specifications ==
=== Processor ===
The Huawei Y6p and Honor Play 5T Youth are equipped with a MediaTek Helio P35 processor and a PowerVR GE8320 GPU.

The Huawei Enjoy 20 features a MediaTek Dimensity 720 processor with a Mali-G57 MC3 GPU.

=== Battery ===
Both smartphones received a 5000 mAh battery. The Huawei Nova Y60 and Enjoy 20 support 10 W charging, while the Honor Play 5T Youth supports 22.5 W fast charging.

=== Cameras ===
The Huawei Nova Y60 and Enjoy 20 feature a triple main camera setup: 13 MP, f/1.8 (wide-angle) with phase detection autofocus + 5 MP, f/2.2 (ultrawide) + 2 MP, f/2.4 (depth sensor).

The Honor Play 5T Youth features a quad main camera setup: 13 MP, f/1.8 (wide-angle) with phase detection autofocus + 5 MP, f/2.2 (ultrawide) + 2 MP, f/2.4 (macro) + 2 MP, f/2.4 (depth sensor).

The front camera on all models has a resolution of 8 MP with an f/2.0 aperture. Both the main and front cameras are capable of recording video at 1080p@30fps.

=== Display ===
All phones are equipped with a 6.6" IPS LCD with HD+ resolution (1600 × 720, 20:9 aspect ratio), a pixel density of 266 ppi, and a waterdrop notch for the front camera.

=== Storage ===
The storage configuration differs from the model:

- The Huawei Nova Y60 was only sold in 4/64 GB configuration.
- The Enjoy 20 was sold in 6/128 and 8/128 GB configurations.
- The Honor Play 5T Youth was sold in 4/64, 4/128, and 6/128 GB configurations.

It is expandable up to 512 GB with the MicroSD memory card.

=== Software ===
The Huawei Nova Y60 was released with EMUI 10, the Enjoy 20 with EMUI 10.1, and the Honor Play 5T Youth with Magic UI 4.0. On all three models, the interface is based on Android 10. Additionally, all models lack Google Play Services; while they are missing from Huawei due to sanctions, they are absent from the Honor Play 5T Youth because it is sold exclusively in China.

The Huawei Enjoy 20 was updated to HarmonyOS 3.
