= Huawei P Smart S =

Android mobile phone

Huawei P Smart S (Huawei Y8p; Huawei Enjoy 10S in China)
- Brand: Huawei
- Manufacturer: Huawei
- Type: Smartphone
- Series: P/Y/Enjoy
- First released: Enjoy 10S: October 25, 2019; Y8p: May 18, 2020; P Smart S: June 9, 2020
- Predecessor: Huawei P Smart+ 2019
- Related: Huawei P Smart 2020; Huawei P Smart 2021; Huawei P Smart Pro; Huawei Y5p; Huawei Y6p; Huawei Y7p
- Compatible networks: GSM, 3G, 4G (LTE)
- Form factor: Slate
- Dimensions: 157.4×73.2×7.8 mm (6.20×2.88×0.31 in)
- Weight: 163 g (6 oz)
- Operating system: P Smart S & Y8p: Android 10 + EMUI 10.1; Current: Android 10 + EMUI 12; Enjoy 10S: Initial: Android 9 Pie + EMUI 9.1; Current: HarmonyOS 3
- CPU: Kirin 710F (12 nm), octa-core (4×2.2 GHz Cortex-A73 & 4×1.7 GHz Cortex-A53)
- GPU: Mali-G51 MP4
- Memory: P Smart S: 4 GB; Y8p: 4/6 GB; Enjoy 10S: 4 GB; LPDDR4
- Storage: P Smart S & Y8p: 128 GB; Enjoy 10S: 64/128 GB eMMC 5.1
- Removable storage: NM (Nano Memory) up to 256 GB
- Battery: Non-removable, Li-Po 4000 mAh
- Charging: 10 W
- Rear camera: 48 MP, f/1.8, 27mm (wide), 1/2.0", 0.8 µm, PDAF + 8 MP, f/2.4, 120˚ (ultrawide) + 2 MP, f/2.4 (depth); LED flash, HDR, panorama Video: 1080p@30fps
- Front camera: 16 MP, f/2.0 HDR; Video: 1080p@30fps
- Display: OLED, 6.3", 2400 × 1080 pixels (FullHD+), 20:9 ratio, 418 ppi
- Media: Audio: MP3, MP4, 3GP, OGG, AMR, AAC, FLAC, WAV, MIDI; Video: 3GP, MP4
- Connectivity: USB-C 2.0, 3.5 mm Audio jack, Bluetooth 5.0 (A2DP, LE), NFC, FM radio, Wi-Fi 802.11 a/b/g/n/ac (dual-band, Wi-Fi Direct, hotspot), GPS, A-GPS, GLONASS, BeiDou
- Other: Fingerprint scanner (under display, optical), proximity sensor, accelerometer, gyroscope, compass
- Website: https://consumer.huawei.com/za/phones/p-smart-s/

The Huawei P Smart S (stylized as HUAWEI P smart S) is a mid-range smartphone developed by Huawei. It was unveiled on June 9, 2020. In several countries, the smartphone was released under the name Huawei Y8p. In China, the device was announced on October 25, 2019, as the Huawei Enjoy 10S.

== Hardware and design ==
The front display panel is made of glass, while the back panel and outer frame are constructed out of plastic composite materials.

The bottom edge of the device features a USB-C port, main speaker grille, and primary microphone. The top edge retains a 3.5 mm headphone jack and a secondary noise-canceling microphone. The left side houses a hybrid card tray accepting two SIM cards or a Nano Memory expandable storage card up to 256 GB. The right side features the physical hardware volume rocker keys and the power sleep/wake button.

=== Display and performance ===
The smartphone is equipped with a 6.3-inch OLED display panel displaying a resolution of 2400 × 1080 pixels (FullHD+). It features a 20:9 aspect ratio, a pixel density of 418 ppi, a waterdrop-style camera notch cutout, and an integrated optical under-display fingerprint scanner.

It runs on a HiSilicon Kirin 710F system-on-chip platform combined with a Mali-G51 MP4 graphics processor unit. Powering the system components is a non-removable 4000 mAh battery capacity cell capable of charging at up to 10 W.

=== Camera setup ===
The rear primary camera array features three sensors:

- A 48 MP main wide-angle lens with an f/1.8 aperture, phase detection autofocus (PDAF), and 0.8 µm pixel size.
- An 8 MP ultrawide lens with an f/2.4 aperture and 120˚ field-of-view.
- A 2 MP depth sensor with an f/2.4 aperture.

The main array captures standard 1080p video resolution configurations at 30 frames per second. The front selfie camera consists of a single 16 MP f/2.0 lens capable of matching 1080p video captures at 30fps.

=== Storage variants ===
The device configurations vary across naming markets:

- P Smart S: Sold with a single setup of 4 GB RAM and 128 GB internal storage.
- Y8p: Available in configurations of 4 GB or 6 GB RAM paired with 128 GB internal storage.
- Enjoy 10S: Offered in 6 GB/64 GB, 4 GB/128 GB, 6 GB/128 GB, and 8 GB/128 GB options.

== Software ==
The Huawei P Smart S and Y8p models originally launched running EMUI 10.1 built over the Android 10 open-source codebase, and were subsequently updated to EMUI 12. The Chinese market variant, the Huawei Enjoy 10S, originally shipped using EMUI 9.1 based on Android 9 Pie and was updated to HarmonyOS 3.
