= Huawei Y9a =

Smartphone model

Huawei (Nova) Y9a Huawei Enjoy 20 Plus 5G
- Brand: Huawei
- Manufacturer: Huawei
- Type: Phablet
- Series: Y/Nova/Enjoy
- First released: Enjoy 20 Plus 5G: September 3, 2020; 5 years ago Y9a: September 7, 2020; 5 years ago Nova Y9a: January 31, 2022; 4 years ago
- Predecessor: Huawei Y9s
- Successor: Huawei Nova Y90
- Related: Huawei Y7a; Huawei Enjoy 20; Huawei Enjoy 20 Pro; Huawei Enjoy 20e Huawei Enjoy 20 SE
- Compatible networks: GSM, 3G, 4G (LTE), 5G (Enjoy 20 Plus 5G)
- Form factor: Slate
- Dimensions: 163.5×76.5×8.95 mm (6.437×3.012×0.352 in)
- Weight: 197 g (7 oz)
- Operating system: Android (operating system) 10 + EMUI 10; Without Google Play
- CPU: Y9a: MediaTek Helio G80 (12 nm), 8 cores (2×2.0 GHz Cortex-A75 & 6×1.8 GHz Cortex-A55); Enjoy 20 Plus 5G: MediaTek MT6853V Dimensity 720 5G (7 nm), 8 cores (2×2.0 GHz Cortex-A75 & 6×2.0 GHz Cortex-A55)
- GPU: Y9a: Mali-G55 MC2; Enjoy 20 Plus 5G: Mali-G57 MC2
- Memory: Y9a/Enjoy 20 Plus 5G: 6/8 GB; Nova Y9a: 8 GB
- Storage: 128 GB, UFS 2.1
- Removable storage: NM (Nano Memory) up to 256 GB
- Battery: All models: non-removable, Li-Po; Y9a/Nova Y9a: 4200/4300 mAh; Enjoy 20 Plus: 4200 mAh
- Charging: Y9a: fast charging at 22.5 W (4200 mAh) fast charging at 40 W (4300 mAh); Enjoy 20 Plus: fast charging at 40 W
- Rear camera: Y9a/Nova Y9a: 64 MP, f/1.8, 26 mm (wide-angle), 1/1.73", 0.8 μm, PDAF + 8 MP, f/2.4, 13 mm (ultra wide-angle) + 2 MP, f/2.4 (macro) + 2 MP, f/2.4 (depth sensor); Enjoy 20 Plus 5G: 48 MP, f/1.8, 26 mm (wide-angle), 1/2.0", 0.8 μm, PDAF + 8 MP, f/2.4, 120˚ (ultra wide-angle) + 2 MP, f/2.4 (depth sensor); LED flash, HDR, panorama Video: 4K@30fps (Enjoy 20 Plus 5G), 1080p@30fps, gyro-EIS
- Front camera: Pop-up; 16 MP, f/2.2 (wide-angle), 1/3.1", 1.0 μm HDR; Video: 1080p@30fps
- Display: Both models: IPS LCD, 6.63", 2400 × 1080 (FullHD+), 20:9, 397 ppi Y9a: 60 Hz; Enjoy 20 Plus 5G: 90 Hz
- Media: Audio: MP3, mp4, MIDI, 3gp, ogg, amr, aac, FLAC, WAV; Video: 3gp, mp4
- Connectivity: USB-C 2.0, 3.5 mm Audio, Bluetooth 5.1 (A2DP, LE), Wi-Fi 802.11 a/b/g/n/ac (dual-band, Wi-Fi Direct, hotspot), GPS, A-GPS, GLONASS, Beidou
- Other: Fingerprint scanner (integrated into the power button), proximity sensor, accelerometer, gyroscope, compass

The Huawei Y9a is a mid-range smartphone developed by Huawei. It was announced on 7 September 2020. Also, on 3 September of the same year in China, Huawei Enjoy 20 Plus 5G was announced, which is a similar model to the Y9a.

On 31 January 2022, the smartphone was re-released under the name Huawei Nova Y9a.

== Design ==
The smartphone's screen is made of glass, and the body case is composed of glossy plastic.

In terms of various designs, the Y9a and Enjoy 20 Plus 5G differ in the placement of the LED flash. On the Y9a, it is positioned outside the camera module, whereas on the Enjoy 20 Plus 5G, it replaces the fourth camera module.

The bottom has a USB-C port, speaker, microphone, and a hybrid slot that supports either two SIM cards or one SIM card and an NM-format memory card with a capacity of up to 256 GB. The top houses a pop-up front camera module, a 3.5 mm audio jack, and a secondary microphone. On the right side, there are volume buttons and a power button, which integrates a fingerprint scanner.

The Huawei (Nova) Y9a is available in three colors: Black (Midnight Black), Silver (Space Silver), and Pink (Sakura Pink).

In China, the Huawei Enjoy 20 Plus 5G was sold in four colors: Black, Silver, Pink, and Green.

== Technical specifications ==
=== Hardware ===
The Huawei (Nova) Y9a is powered by a MediaTek Helio G80 processor paired with a Mali-G52 MC2 GPU, while the Enjoy 20 Plus 5G features the MediaTek Dimensity 720 5G along with a Mali-G57 MC2 GPU.

=== Battery ===
The battery capacity of the Huawei (Nova) Y9a varies by region, offering either 4200 or 4300 mAh with support for fast charging at 22.5 W or 40 W, respectively.

The Huawei Enjoy 20 Plus 5G is equipped with a 4200 mAh battery and supports fast charging at 40 W.

=== Camera ===
The (Nova) Y9a features a primary quad-camera setup: 64 MP, f/1.8 (wide-angle) + 8 MP, f/2.4 (ultra wide-angle) + 2 MP, f/2.4 (macro) + 2 MP, f/2.4 (depth sensor) with phase detection autofocus and video recording at 1080p@30fps.

The Enjoy 20 Plus 5G features a primary triple-camera setup: 48 MP, f/1.8 (wide-angle) + 8 MP, f/2.4 (ultra wide-angle) + 2 MP, f/2.4 (depth sensor) with phase detection autofocus and video recording at 4K@30fps.

The front camera has a pop-up mechanism, a resolution of 16 MP, an aperture of f/2.2 (wide-angle), and can record video at 1080p@30fps.

=== Display ===
The display is an IPS LCD measuring 6.63" with FullHD+ resolution (2400 × 1080), a pixel density of 397 ppi, and an aspect ratio of 20:9. Additionally, the Enjoy 20 Plus features a 90 Hz refresh rate.

=== Storage ===
The Y9a and Enjoy 20 Plus 5G were available in configurations of 6/128 and 8/128 GB, while the Nova Y9a was available only in the 8/128 GB configuration.

=== Software ===
The smartphones were released with EMUI 10.1 based on Android 10. Applications can be installed via the proprietary Huawei AppGallery.
