= Huawei Nova 9 =

Smartphone by Huawei

Huawei Nova 9 Huawei Nova 9 Pro
- Manufacturer: Huawei
- Type: Smartphone
- Series: Nova
- First released: September 23, 2021; 4 years ago
- Predecessor: Huawei Nova 8
- Successor: Huawei Nova 10
- Related: Huawei Nova 9 SE; Honor 50
- Compatible networks: GSM / CDMA / HSPA / LTE
- Form factor: Slate
- Dimensions: Nova 9: 160 mm (6.3 in) H 73.7 mm (2.90 in) W 7.8 mm (0.31 in) D; Nova 9 Pro: 163.4 mm (6.43 in) H 74.4 mm (2.93 in) W 8 mm (0.31 in) D
- Weight: Nova 9: 175 g (6.2 oz); Nova 9 Pro: 186 g (6.6 oz)
- Operating system: HarmonyOS 2.0 (China), EMUI 12 (Europe) (no Google Play Services)
- System-on-chip: Snapdragon 778G 4G (6 nm)
- CPU: Octa-core (4x2.4 GHz Kryo 670 & 4x1.8 GHz Kryo 670)
- GPU: Adreno 642L
- Memory: 8 GB RAM
- Storage: 128 GB, 256 GB
- Removable storage: None
- SIM: Single SIM (Nano-SIM) or Dual SIM (Nano-SIM, dual stand-by)
- Battery: 4300 mAh
- Charging: Fast charging 66W
- Rear camera: 50 MP, f/1.9, 23mm (wide), PDAF; 8 MP, f/2.2, (ultrawide); 2 MP, f/2.4, (depth); 2 MP, f/2.4, (macro); LED flash, panorama, HDR; 4K, 1080p, 720p@960fps, gyro-EIS
- Front camera: Nova 9: 32 MP, f/2.0, (wide) 4K@30fps, 1080p@30fps, 720p@240fps, gyro-EIS; Nova 9 Pro: 32 MP, f/2.0, (wide) 32 MP, f/2.4, 100˚ (ultrawide) 4K@30fps, 1080p@30fps, gyro-EIS
- Display: Nova 9: 6.57 in (167 mm) 1080 x 2340 resolution, 19.5:9 ratio (~392 ppi density); Nova 9 Pro: 6.72 in (171 mm) 1236 x 2676 pixels, 19.5:9 ratio (~439 ppi density); Both: OLED, 1B colors, HDR10, 120Hz refresh rate
- Sound: Loudspeaker
- Connectivity: Wi-Fi 802.11 a/b/g/n/a/6, dual-band, Wi-Fi Direct, hotspot Bluetooth 5.2, A2DP, LE
- Data inputs: Multi-touch screen USB Type-C 2.0; Sensors: Fingerprint scanner (under display, optical); Accelerometer; Gyroscope; Proximity sensor; Compass
- Website: consumer.huawei.com/en/phones/nova9/

Huawei Nova 9 is a smartphone manufactured by Huawei. It was announced on September 23, 2021.
