= Huawei P Smart 2021 =

Android mobile smartphone

Huawei P Smart 2021 (Huawei Y7a) Huawei Enjoy 20 SE Honor 10X Lite
- Brand: Huawei, Honor
- Manufacturer: Huawei
- Type: Phablet
- Series: Huawei P / Y / Enjoy series Honor X series
- First released: P Smart 2021: September 28, 2020; 5 years ago Y7a: October 21, 2020; 5 years ago Honor 10X Lite: October 29, 2020; 5 years ago Enjoy 20 SE: December 23, 2020; 5 years ago
- Predecessor: Huawei P Smart 2020; Huawei Y7p; Honor 9X Lite
- Successor: Huawei Nova Y70
- Related: Huawei P Smart S Huawei Y9a; Huawei Enjoy 20; Huawei Enjoy 20 Pro; Honor X10; Honor X10 Max
- Compatible networks: GSM, 3G, 4G LTE
- Form factor: Slate
- Dimensions: 165.7×76.9×9.3 mm (6.52×3.03×0.37 in)
- Weight: 206 g (7 oz)
- Operating system: P Smart 2021 / Y7a / Enjoy 20 SE: Android 10 without Google Play Services, EMUI 10.1; Honor 10X Lite: Android 10 without Google Play Services, Magic UI 3.1
- System-on-chip: Kirin 710A (14 nm)
- CPU: Octa-core (4×2.0 GHz Cortex-A73 & 4×1.7 GHz Cortex-A53)
- GPU: Mali-G51 MP4
- Memory: P Smart 2021 / Y7a / Honor 10X Lite: 4 GB RAM; Enjoy 20 SE: 4 GB or 8 GB RAM
- Storage: P Smart 2021 / Enjoy 20 SE: 128 GB; Y7a / Honor 10X Lite: 64 GB or 128 GB
- Removable storage: microSDXC up to 512 GB
- SIM: Dual SIM (Nano-SIM)
- Battery: Non-removable Li-Po 5000 mAh
- Charging: 22.5 W fast charging
- Rear camera: P Smart 2021 / Y7a / Honor 10X Lite: 48 MP, f/1.8, 26mm (wide), 1/2", 0.8µm, PDAF + 8 MP, f/2.4, 120˚ (ultrawide) + 2 MP, f/2.4 (macro) + 2 MP, f/2.4 (depth); Enjoy 20 SE: 13 MP, f/1.8, 26mm (wide), PDAF + 8 MP, f/2.4, 120˚ (ultrawide) + 2 MP, f/2.4 (macro); LED flash, HDR, panorama Video: 1080p@30/60fps
- Front camera: 8 MP, f/2.0 HDR; Video: 1080p@30fps
- Display: IPS LCD, 6.67 inches, 2400 × 1080 pixels (FHD+), 20:9 aspect ratio, 395 ppi
- Sound: Mono speaker
- Media: Audio: MP3, MP4, 3GP, OGG, AMR, AAC, FLAC, WAV, MIDI; Video: 3GP, MP4
- Connectivity: USB-C 2.0, 3.5 mm audio jack, Bluetooth 5.1 (A2DP, LE), NFC (region dependent on P Smart 2021 / included on Honor 10X Lite), Wi-Fi 802.11 b/g/n (Wi-Fi Direct), GPS, A-GPS, GLONASS, BeiDou
- Data inputs: Side-mounted fingerprint scanner, Proximity sensor, accelerometer, gyroscope, compass
- Model: P Smart 2021: PPA-LX2, PPA-L22; Y7a: PPA-L02B, PPA-LX2B, PPA-L22B, PPA-L03B, PPA-LX3B, PPA-L23B; Enjoy 20 SE: PPA-AL20; Honor 10X Lite: DNN-LX9, DNN-L29
- Codename: P Smart 2021 / Y7a / Honor 10X Lite: Peppa; Enjoy 20 SE: Peppa C

The Huawei P Smart 2021 (stylized as HUAWEI P smart 2021) is a mid-range Android smartphone developed by Huawei. It was announced on September 28, 2020. In several regions, the device was released under the marketing name Huawei Y7a. In China, the device was introduced alongside the Huawei Nova 8 series as the Huawei Enjoy 20 SE on December 23, 2020, featuring a modified rear camera architecture configuration.

On October 29, 2020, the Honor 10X Lite was announced, differing from the primary P Smart 2021 design primarily via its rear panel camera housing cosmetics layout.

== Design ==
The smartphones feature a front glass display assembly built into a structural plastic mid-frame and a plastic rear unibody cover.

The primary visual distinction between the P Smart 2021 and the Enjoy 20 SE is the exclusion of the fourth camera sensor module on the Enjoy 20 SE, which features an "AI" print logo branding mark in its place. The Honor 10X Lite features a redesigned, wider rectangular camera housing module island arrangement compared to its sibling variations.

The physical I/O layout consists of a USB-C 2.0 port, secondary loudspeaker grill, primary microphone acoustic port, and a 3.5 mm headphone jack at the base, while the secondary noise-canceling microphone sits at the top edge. The left chassis rail houses a triple-slot card tray supporting dual Nano-SIM cards alongside dedicated hardware expansion via a microSD slot supporting capacities up to 512 GB. The right rail integrates the volume rocker matrix and an embedded capacitive fingerprint scanner built directly into the sleep/wake power button assembly.

The Honor 10X Lite was made available in three color finishes: Midnight Black, Icelandic Frost, and Emerald Green. All other models shared a separate color selection palette: Midnight Black, Blush Gold, and Crush Green.

== Specifications ==
=== Hardware and performance ===
The smartphone series is powered by the HiSilicon Kirin 710A system-on-chip built on a 14 nm fabrication process node. The central processing unit configuration is arranged in an octa-core layout comprising 4×2.0 GHz Cortex-A73 performance cores along with 4×1.7 GHz Cortex-A53 efficiency cores. Graphics rendering processing tasks are handled by an integrated Mali-G51 MP4 graphics processing unit.

Storage allocations scale across models: the Huawei P Smart 2021 is configured exclusively with 4 GB of RAM and 128 GB of internal storage; the Huawei Y7a and Honor 10X Lite offer a choice between 64 GB or 128 GB variants coupled with 4 GB of RAM; the Chinese market Enjoy 20 SE provides either 4 GB or 8 GB of RAM combined with 128 GB of onboard flash storage.

=== Battery and charging ===
The system relies on a non-removable 5,000 mAh lithium polymer internal battery cell. Power delivery profiles support proprietary SuperCharge fast charging protocols up to a maximum throughput rating of 22.5 watts via the USB-C interface.

=== Camera systems ===
The primary camera arrangement on the Huawei P Smart 2021, Y7a, and Honor 10X Lite consists of a quad-camera system:

- Wide: 48 MP image sensor with an f/1.8 aperture lens, 26mm focal equivalence, 1/2" optical format size, 0.8 µm pixel pitch, and phase-detection autofocus (PDAF).
- Ultrawide: 8 MP sensor with an f/2.4 aperture lens delivering a 120-degree field of view.
- Macro: 2 MP dedicated close-up lens with an f/2.4 aperture.
- Depth: 2 MP spatial calculation sensor with an f/2.4 aperture profile.

The Enjoy 20 SE downscales to a triple-camera system, substituting a lower resolution 13 MP, f/1.8 primary wide sensor and omitting the depth sensor module completely. The rear video capture capabilities across all variants top out at an unstabilized resolution ceiling of 1080p at either 30 or 60 frames per second. The front-facing selfie camera camera system contains an 8 MP sensor matrix behind an f/2.0 optical lens array capable of recording 1080p video clips at 30 frames per second.

=== Display ===
The front of the device contains an external 6.67-inch IPS LCD capacitive touchscreen panel featuring a display resolution of 2400 × 1080 pixels (Full HD+). This yields an overall pixel density of roughly 395 ppi across a modern elongated 20:9 cinematic aspect ratio. The screen layout features a centralized punch-hole cutout near the top edge for the selfie camera assembly.

=== Connectivity ===
Wireless network radios include single-band Wi-Fi 802.11 b/g/n networks, Wi-Fi Direct file transport, and Bluetooth 5.1 with legacy A2DP audio profiles and LE. Global positioning engine calculations resolve across GPS, A-GPS, GLONASS, and BeiDou satellite arrays. NFC hardware configuration parameters depend completely on local global market regions for the core Huawei P Smart 2021 models, whereas NFC support comes standard on all global editions of the Honor 10X Lite.

=== Software ===
The Honor 10X Lite variant runs Magic UI 3.1 software skin out of the box, whereas the counterpart Huawei models ship running EMUI 10.1 software layers. Both proprietary operating configurations are deployed directly on top of an open-source framework core of Android 10. It was received an optimization from the update.

Due to trade restrictions, none of these model configurations contain proprietary closed-source Google Play Services frameworks or the Google Play Store storefront. Instead, app management relies completely on the Huawei Mobile Services (HMS) system framework and the Huawei AppGallery distribution app marketplace platform. Alternative software options bundled out of the box include localized utility platforms developed directly by Huawei, such as Petal Maps for location navigation services, Petal Search for universal indexing lookups, and Phone Clone for secure local data migrations from external devices.

== Reception ==
GSMArena reviewers marked the positive features like charging, battery life, display, and the camera, but it was criticized its Google Play Services and 4K support due to its absence. It was also criticized its low display refresh rate. UnboxPH review Duey Guison criticizes the front camera due to overexposure in daylight conditions, stating "I guess that this is more of a software-related issue, and I hope that Huawei addresses the exposure issues of the Y7a's front camera."
