= Huawei P Smart 2020 =

2020 Android Smartphone

- Brand: Huawei
- Manufacturer: Huawei
- Type: Smartphone
- Series: P series
- First released: April 29, 2020; 6 years ago
- Predecessor: Huawei P Smart 2019
- Successor: Huawei P Smart 2021
- Related: Huawei P Smart S
- Compatible networks: GSM, 3G, 4G (LTE)
- Form factor: Slate
- Colors: Midnight Black, Aurora Blue, Green
- Dimensions: 155.2×73.4×8 mm (6.11×2.89×0.31 in)
- Weight: 160 g (6 oz)
- Operating system: Android 9 Pie with EMUI 9.1
- CPU: Kirin 710 (12 nm), octa-core (4x2.2 GHz Cortex-A73 & 4x1.7 GHz Cortex-A53)
- GPU: Mali-G51 MP4
- Memory: 4 GB LPDDR4
- Storage: 128 GB UFS 2.1
- Removable storage: MicroSDXC up to 512 GB
- Battery: Non-removable Li-Ion 3400 mAh
- Rear camera: 13 MP, f/1.8, PDAF + 2 MP, f/2.4 (depth sensor); LED flash, HDR, panorama Video: 1080p@30fps
- Front camera: 8 MP, f/2.0 HDR; Video: 1080p@30fps
- Display: LTPS IPS LCD, 6.21", 2340 x 1080 (Full HD+), 19.5:9 ratio, 415 ppi
- Media: Audio: MP3, mp4, 3GP, ogg, amr, aac, flac, wav, midi Video: 3GP, mp4
- Connectivity: USB-C 2.0, 3.5 mm audio jack, Bluetooth 4.2 (A2DP, LE), NFC, FM radio, Wi-Fi 802.11 b/g/n/ac (Wi-Fi Direct, hotspot), GPS, A-GPS, GLONASS, BDS
- Data inputs: Fingerprint (rear-mounted), proximity, accelerometer, gyroscope, compass
- Website: https://consumer.huawei.com/en/phones/p-smart-2020/

The Huawei P Smart 2020 (stylized as HUAWEI P smart 2020) is a mid-range smartphone manufactured by Huawei. It was announced on April 29, 2020.

== Specifications ==
=== Hardware ===
The P smart 2020 in powered by the Kirin 710 processor and the Mali-G51 MP4 graphics processor. It has a battery capacity of 3400 mAh.

The P smart 2020 features a 6.21-inch LTPS In-Plane Switching LCD, with full HD (resulution of 2340 x 1080 and an aspect ratio of 19.5:9) at a pixel density of 415 ppi, and the front camera's teardrop notch.

It is only sold in 4 GB RAM/128 GB internal memory configuration.

The P smart's main camera is a dual camera module, featuring with a 13 MP main camera (f/1.8) and a 2 MP depth sensor camera (f/2.4) with phase detection autofocus. The front camera features an 8 MP camera (f/2.0) and uses Huawei's AI algorithm. Both the main and front can record a video resolution of 1080p at 30fps.

=== Software ===
The smartphone was released on EMUI 9.1, which is based on Android Pie. Installation of applications are accessed via Huawei AppGallery or Google Play Store.

== Reception ==
The design features a "quite slim and light smartphone" due to its small battery. The power consumption is a little higher than the predecessor. Despite the charging, it can take less than two hours to fully charge the battery.
