= Honor X10 =

2020 Honor smartphone

- Brand: Honor
- Manufacturer: Huawei
- Type: Smartphone
- Series: Honor X
- First released: May 20, 2020
- Predecessor: Honor 9X
- Successor: Honor X20
- Related: Honor X10 Max; Honor 10X Lite
- Compatible networks: GSM, HSPA, 4G (LTE), 5G
- Form factor: Slate
- Colors: Fiery Orange, Midnight Black, Sapphire Blue, Titanium Silver
- Dimensions: 163.7×76.5×8.8 mm (6.44×3.01×0.35 in)
- Weight: 203 g (7 oz)
- Operating system: Initial: Android 10, without Google Play Services, Magic UI 3 Current: HarmonyOS 3
- CPU: Hisilicon Kirin 820 5G; Cortex-A76 1×2.36 GHz; Cortex-A76 3×2.22 GHz; Cortex-A55 4×1.84 GHz
- GPU: Mali-G57 (6-core)
- Memory: 6 GB; 8 GB
- Storage: 64 GB; 128 GB
- Removable storage: NM (Nano Memory) up to 256 GB
- Battery: Li-Po 4300 mAh
- Charging: 22.5 W fast charging
- Rear camera: 40 MP with Sony IMX600y RYYB sensor (f/1.8) PDAF + 8 MP (f/2.4) + 2 MP (f/2.4)
- Front camera: 16 MP (f/2.2)
- Display: 6.63" IPS; 1080 × 2400 px (FullHD+), with 90Hz refresh rate
- Connectivity: USB-C, 3.5 mm jack, Wi-Fi 802.11 a/b/g/n/ac Bluetooth 4.2 + BLE; NFC
- Data inputs: Multi-touch touchscreen

The Honor X10, also known as Honor X10 5G, is a smartphone manufactured by Huawei under the subsidiary brand Honor. It was anoounced on May 20, 2020, until it was available on May 26, 2020, in China.

It was available in 4 color options: Fiery Orange, Midnight Black, Sapphire Blue, and Titanium Silver. The whole display is notchless, featuring a pop-up front camera.

== Specifications ==
Hardware
Category	Honor X20
CPU (Central processor)	8 cores - 1x 2.36 GHz Cortex-A76, 3x 2.22 GHz Cortex-A76 & 4x 1.84 GHz Cortex-A55
GPU	6x Mali-G57
Chpset	Kirin 820 5G
Internal Memory	64GB or 128GB
RAM	6GB or 8GB
Battery	Lithium polymer 4300 mAh; with 22.5W charger; 5W reverse wired
Main Camera	Triple: 40MP "Ultra Vision Camera" (Sony IMX600y, aperture f/1.8), wide-angle, 1/1.7" with PDAF; 8MP ( aperture f/2.4) 17mm, at 120 degrees (ultrawide) (auxiliary lens); 2MP in-depth sensor (aperture f/2.4); features LED flash, panorama and HDR; Video can record up to 4K@30fps, 1080p@30fps or 720p@960fps with EIS
Front Camera	Pop-up 16MP, (aperture f/2.2), 24mm (wide), 1/3.06", 1.0 µm with HDR Video can record up to 1080p@30fps
Display	Notchless display, 6.63" IPS LCD with 90 Hz refresh rate, 1080 x 2400 px (20:9) with 397 ppi density

Software, connectivity and sensors
Category	Honor X10
Software	Android 10, with Magic UI 3 (exception of Google Play Services)
Connectivity	Wi-Fi a/b/g/n/ac DualBand, Wi-Fi Direct, hotspot, Bluetooth 5.0 (A2DP, LE), and NFC
Navigation	GPS, GLONASS, BeiDou, and A-GPS
Sensors	Proximity sensor, light sensor, digital compass, accelerometer, gyroscope, fingerprint scanner, and face unlock
