= Huawei Y8s =

2020 Androind smartphone by Huawei

- Manufacturer: Huawei
- Type: Smartphone
- Series: Y
- First released: May 6, 2020; 6 years ago
- Related: Huawei Y6s; Huawei Y9s
- Compatible networks: GSM, 3G, 4G (LTE)
- Form factor: Slate
- Dimensions: 162.4×77.1×8.1 mm (6.39×3.04×0.32 in)
- Weight: 180 g (6 oz)
- Operating system: Android 9 Pie + EMUI 9.1
- System-on-chip: Kirin 710 (12 nm)
- CPU: Octa-core (4×2.2 GHz Cortex-A73 & 4×1.7 GHz Cortex-A53)
- GPU: Mali-G51 MP4
- Memory: 4 GB LPDDR4
- Storage: 64/128 GB eMMC 5.1
- Removable storage: microSDXC up to 512 GB
- Battery: Non-removable, Li-Po 4000 mAh
- Rear camera: 48 MP, f/1.8, 26 mm (wide), 1/2.0", 0.8μm, PDAF + 2 MP, f/2.4, (depth sensor); LED flash, HDR, panorama Video: 1080p@30fps
- Front camera: 8 MP, f/2.0 (wide) + 2 MP, f/2.4, (depth sensor); HDR; Video: 1080p@30fps
- Display: IPS LCD, 6.5", 2340 x 1080 (FullHD+), 19.5:9, 396 ppi
- Media: Audio: mp3, mp4, midi, 3gp, ogg, amr, aac, flac, wav Video: 3gp, mp4
- Connectivity: MicroUSB 2.0, 3.5 mm Audio, Bluetooth 4.2 (A2DP, LE), FM radio, Wi-Fi 802.11 b/g/n (Wi-Fi Direct, hotspot), GPS, A-GPS, GLONASS, BDS
- Other: Fingerprint scanner (rear-mounted), proximity sensor, accelerometer, compass

The Huawei Y8s is an Android smartphone developed by Huawei, belonging to the Y series. It was unveiled on May 6, 2020.

== Design ==
The smartphone's screen is made of glass. The body is made of glossy plastic.

At the bottom are a microUSB connector, a speaker, a microphone, and a 3.5 mm audio jack. A second microphone is located at the top. On the left side, depending on the version, there is a slot for 1 or 2 SIM cards and a microSD memory card up to 512 GB. On the right side are the volume control buttons and the smartphone lock button. The fingerprint scanner is located on the back panel.

The Huawei Y8s is sold in Midnight Black and Emerald Green colors.

== Specifications ==
=== Platform ===
The smartphone features a Kirin 710 processor and a Mali-G51 MP4 GPU.

=== Battery ===
The battery has a capacity of 4000 mAh.

=== Cameras ===
The smartphone is equipped with a dual main camera consisting of a 48 MP, f/1.8 (wide-angle) and a 2 MP, f/2.4 (depth sensor) with phase detection autofocus, capable of recording video at 1080p@30fps. It also features a dual front camera: an 8 MP, f/2.0 (wide-angle) and a 2 MP, f/2.4 (depth sensor), capable of recording video at 1080p@30fps.

=== Display ===
The display is an IPS LCD measuring 6.5", with FullHD+ resolution (2340 x 1080), a pixel density of 393 ppi, a 19.5:9 aspect ratio, and a notch for the dual front camera.

=== Storage ===
The smartphone is available in 4/64 GB and 4/128 GB configurations.

=== Software ===
The smartphone was released running EMUI 9.1 based on Android 9 Pie.

== See also ==
- Huawei Y6 (2017)
- Redmi 8
