= Huawei Nova Y90 =

2022 smartphone model

Huawei Nova Y90 (Huawei Enjoy 50 Pro in China) Nzone 50 Pro
- Brand: Huawei/China Mobile
- Manufacturer: Huawei
- Type: Phablet
- Series: Huawei Y/Enjoy; Nzone
- First released: Nova Y90: June 23, 2022; 4 years ago Enjoy 50 Pro: July 27, 2022; 4 years ago Nzone 50 Pro: August 29, 2022; 3 years ago
- Availability by region: China, Worldwide
- Predecessor: Huawei Y9a; Huawei Enjoy 20 Pro
- Successor: Huawei Nova Y91; Huawei Enjoy 60 Pro
- Related: Huawei Nova Y60; Huawei Nova Y70; Huawei Enjoy 50z
- Compatible networks: Nova Y90/Enjoy 50 Pro: GSM, 3G, 4G (LTE); Nzone 50 Pro: GSM, 3G, 4G (LTE), 5G
- Form factor: Slate
- Colors: Nova Y90: Midnight Black, Pearl White, Crystal Blue, Emerald Green; Enjoy 50 Pro/Nzone 50 Pro: Black, White, Blue, Green
- Dimensions: H: 163.3 mm W: 74.7 mm T: 8.4 mm
- Weight: 195 g (7 oz)
- Operating system: Nova Y90: Original: Android 11 (without Google services) + EMUI 12; Current: Android 12 (without Google services) + EMUI 14.2; Enjoy 50 Pro/Nzone 50 Pro: Original: HarmonyOS 2.0; Current: HarmonyOS 4.2
- System-on-chip: Nova Y90/Enjoy 50 Pro: Qualcomm SM6225 Snapdragon 680 4G (6 nm); Nzone 50 Pro: MediaTek Dimensity 700 (7 nm)
- CPU: Nova Y90/Enjoy 50 Pro: Octa-core (4×2.4 GHz Kryo 265 Gold & 4×1.9 GHz Kryo 265 Silver); Nzone 50 Pro: Octa-core (2×2.2 GHz Cortex-A76 & 6×2 GHz Cortex-A55)
- GPU: Nova Y90/Enjoy 50 Pro: Adreno 610; Nzone 50 Pro: Mali-G57 MC2
- Memory: Nova Y90: 4/6/8 GB; Enjoy 50 Pro/Nzone 50 Pro: 8 GB; LPDDR4X
- Storage: Nova Y90: 128 GB; Enjoy 50 Pro/Nzone 50 Pro: 128/256 GB; UFS 2.2
- SIM: Nova Y90: Nano-SIM or Dual SIM (Nano-SIM); Enjoy 50 Pro/Nzone 50 Pro:: Dual SIM (Nano-SIM)
- Battery: Non-removable, Li-Po 5000 mAh
- Charging: 40 W fast charging
- Rear camera: 50 MP, f/1.8 (wide), PDAF + 2 MP, f/2.4 (macro) + 2 MP, f/2.4 (depth sensor); LED flash, panorama, HDR; Video: 1080p@30fps
- Front camera: Nova Y90/Enjoy 50 Pro: 8 MP, f/2.0 Nzone 50 Pro: 16 MP; Video: 1080p@30fps
- Display: IPS LCD, 90 Hz, 6.7", 2388 × 1080 (FHD+), 19.9:9, 391 ppi
- Sound: Mono speaker
- Connectivity: USB-C 2.0, 3.5 mm audio, Bluetooth 5.0 (A2DP, LE), NFC (Enjoy 50 Pro/region/market dependent Nova Y90), Wi-Fi 802.11 a/b/g/n/ac (dual-band, Wi-Fi Direct), GPS (A-GPS), GLONASS, BeiDou, Galileo, QZSS
- Data inputs: Fingerprint scanner (side-mounted), accelerometer, virtual proximity sensor, compass
- Codename: Nova Y90/Enjoy 50 Pro: Cartier

The Huawei Nova Y90 (stylized as HUAWEI nova Y90) is a mid-range smartphone from the Nova series, developed by Huawei. It was unveiled on June 23, 2022. It is the successor to the Huawei Y9a. In the People's Republic of China, the smartphone was sold under the name Huawei Enjoy 50 Pro.

On August 29, 2022, Chinese telecommunications operator China Mobile also unveiled the Nzone 50 Pro, which differs from the Huawei Enjoy 50 Pro only in its processor with 5G support and its front camera.

== Design ==
The front panel is made of glass, while the frame and back panel are made of plastic.

The rear of the smartphones resembles the Huawei Mate 40.

On the bottom, there's a slot for either 2 SIM cards (depending on the Nova Y90 model) or 1 SIM card, and exclusively 2 SIM cards for the Enjoy 50 Pro and Nzone 50 Pro. Also on the bottom are a microphone, a USB-C port, and a speaker. On the top, there's a 3.5 mm audio jack and a second microphone. The right side features a volume rocker and a power button with a built-in fingerprint scanner.

The smartphones were sold in 4 colors: Black (Midnight Black), White (Pearl White), Blue (Crystal Blue), and Green (Emerald Green).

== Technical specifications ==
=== Hardware ===
The Huawei Nova Y90/Enjoy 50 Pro features a Qualcomm Snapdragon 680 4G processor with an Adreno 610 GPU, while the Nzone 50 Pro uses a MediaTek Dimensity 700 with Mali-G57 MC2.

=== Storage ===
The Huawei Nova Y90 has 128 GB of internal storage and 4 GB, 6 GB, or 8 GB of RAM depending on the configuration. The Enjoy 50 Pro and Nzone 50 Pro come with 128 GB or 256 GB of internal storage and 8 GB of RAM.

=== Battery ===
The battery has a capacity of 5000 mAh and supports fast charging up to 40 W.

=== Display ===
The display is a 6.7-inch IPS LCD with Full HD+ resolution (2340 × 1080), a pixel density of 391 ppi, a 19.9:9 aspect ratio, and a circular cutout for the front camera.

=== Camera ===
The models feature a triple main camera with a 50 MP wide-angle lens with an f/1.8 aperture and phase detection autofocus, along with a 2 MP macro lens and a 2 MP depth sensor, both with an f/2.4 aperture. The Huawei Nova Y90/Enjoy 50 Pro also has an 8 MP front camera with an f/2.0 aperture, while the Nzone 50 Pro has a 16 MP front camera. Both the main and front cameras can record video at 1080p@30fps.

=== Software ===
The Huawei Nova Y90 was released with EMUI 12 based on Android 11 without Google services and was updated to EMUI 14.2 based on Android 12. The Enjoy 50 Pro and Nzone 50 Pro were released with HarmonyOS 2.0 and were updated to HarmonyOS 4.2.
