= Huawei Nova 8i =

Huawei smartphone

Huawei Nova 8i Honor X20 Honor Play 5 Youth Edition Honor 50 Lite
- Brand: Huawei, Honor
- Manufacturer: Huawei
- Type: Phablet
- Series: Huawei Nova; Honor N / X / Play
- First released: Nova 8i: July 7, 2021; 4 years ago Honor X20: August 13, 2021; 4 years ago Honor Play 5 Youth & 50 Lite: August 13, 2021; 4 years ago
- Availability by region: August 12, 2021: Philippines; October 12, 2021: Germany
- Predecessor: Huawei Nova 7i Honor X10; Honor 30 Lite
- Successor: Huawei Nova 11i Honor X30
- Related: Huawei Nova 8 Huawei Nova 8 SE; Honor Play 5 Honor 50
- Compatible networks: GSM, 3G, 4G, LTE, 5G (Honor X20 & Play 5 Youth)
- Form factor: Slate
- Dimensions: 161.85×74.7×8.58 mm (6.372×2.941×0.338 in)
- Weight: Nova 8i: 190 g Honor X20 & Play 5 Youth & 50 Lite: 192 g
- Operating system: Initial: Nova 8i: Android 10 with EMUI 11; Honor X20 & Play 5 Youth & 50 Lite: Android 11 with Magic UI 4.2; Without Google Play Services (except Honor 50 Lite)
- CPU: Nova 8i: Qualcomm Snapdragon 662 (11 nm), octa-core (4×2.0 GHz Kryo 260 Gold & 4×1.8 GHz Kryo 260 Silver); Honor X20 & Play 5 Youth: MediaTek Dimensity 900 (6 nm), octa-core (2×2.4 GHz Cortex-A78 & 6×2.0 GHz Cortex-A55)
- GPU: Nova 8i & Honor 50 Lite: Adreno 610; Honor X20 & Play 5 Youth: Mali-G78 MC4
- Memory: Nova 8i & Honor X20 & 50 Lite: 6/8 GB; Honor Play 5 Youth: 6/8 GB; LPDDR4X
- Storage: Nova 8i & Honor 50 Lite: 128 GB; Honor X20 & Play 5 Youth: 128/256 GB; UFS 2.1
- Battery: Non-removable, Li-Po 4300 mAh
- Charging: 66W fast charging, 60% in 17 min, 100% in 38 min
- Rear camera: Nova 8i & Honor 50 Lite: 64 MP, f/1.9, 26 mm (wide), PDAF + 8 MP f/2.4, 120° (ultrawide) + 2 MP, f/2.4 (macro) + 2 MP, f/2.4 (depth); Honor X20: 64 MP, f/1.9, 26 mm (wide), PDAF + 2 MP, f/2.4 (macro) + 2 MP, f/2.4 (depth) Honor Play 5 Youth: 64 MP, f/1.9, 26 mm (wide), PDAF + 2 MP, f/2.4 (depth); LED flash, HDR, panorama Video: 1080p@30fps
- Front camera: 16 MP, f/2.0 (wide); HDR; Video: 1080p@30fps
- Display: All models: IPS LCD 6.67", 2376 × 1080 (FullHD+), 391 ppi Nova 8i and Honor X20 & 50 Lite: 60 Hz; Honor Play 5 Youth: 120 Hz
- Connectivity: USB-C 2.0, 3.5 mm audio jack, Bluetooth 5.0 (Nova 8i & Honor 50 Lite) / 5.1 (Honor X20 & Play 5 Youth) (A2DP, LE), Wi-Fi 802.11 a/b/g/n/ac (dual-band, Wi-Fi Direct, hotspot), GPS, A-GPS, GLONASS, BeiDou, Galileo
- Data inputs: Fingerprint scanner (side-mounted), proximity sensor, accelerometer, gyroscope, compass

The Huawei Nova 8i (stylized as HUAWEI nova 8i) is a mid-range Android smartphone developed, manufactured, and marketed by Huawei as part of its Nova series. It was introduced on July 7, 2021. On August 13 of the same year, the spin-off brand Honor introduced a similar model, the Honor X20, which differs in its processor, 5G support, and the lack of an ultrawide camera module. On October 25 of the same year, the Honor Play 5 Youth Edition was announced, differing from the Honor X20 in its camera module design, the absence of a macro module, and a higher display refresh rate. Also on October 25, the Honor 50 Lite was introduced for the global market, which is identical to the Huawei Nova 8i but features color options from the Honor X20 and includes Google Play Services.

== Design ==
The front screen is made of glass, while the body is constructed from glossy plastic.

The bottom features a USB-C port, loudspeaker, microphone, and a dual SIM card slot. The top houses a secondary microphone and a 3.5 mm audio jack. The right side contains the volume rocker and the power button, which integrates a fingerprint scanner.

- The Huawei Nova 8i is available in three colors: Starry Black, Moonlight Silver, and Interstellar Blue.
- In China, the Honor X20 is sold in three colors: Black, Silver, and Blue.
- In China, the Honor Play 5 Youth is available in Black and Blue.
- The Honor 50 Lite comes in three color options: Midnight Black, Space Silver, and Deep Sea Blue.

== Specifications ==
=== Hardware ===
The Huawei Nova 8i and Honor 50 Lite are powered by a Qualcomm Snapdragon 662 processor coupled with an Adreno 610 GPU.

The Honor X20 and Play 5 Youth Edition feature a MediaTek Dimensity 900 processor alongside a Mali-G78 MC4 GPU.

All models are equipped with a non-removable 4300 mAh battery that supports 66W fast charging, advertised to charge up to 60% in 17 minutes and reach 100% in 38 minutes.

=== Display ===
The phones feature a 6.67-inch IPS LCD display with a FullHD+ resolution (2376 × 1080 pixels) and a pixel density of 391 ppi. The screen has a pill-shaped cutout for the front camera located in the upper left corner. The Huawei Nova 8i, Honor X20, and Honor 50 Lite support a standard 60 Hz refresh rate, while the Honor Play 5 Youth configuration supports a 120 Hz refresh rate.

=== Storage and memory ===
- Huawei Nova 8i & Honor 50 Lite: Available in 6 GB or 8 GB of RAM configurations with 128 GB of internal storage.
- Honor X20: Available in configurations of 6/128 GB and 8/256 GB.
- Honor Play 5 Youth: Available in 8/128 GB and 8/256 GB configurations.

=== Cameras ===
The camera module and design differ from the following models:

- Huawei Nova 8i & Honor 50 Lite were equipped with a quad-camera setup consisting of a 64 MP main sensor with an f/1.8 aperture (wide-angle) and phase-detection autofocus (PDAF), an 8 MP ultrawide lens (f/2.4, 120° field of view), a 2 MP macro lens (f/2.4), and a 2 MP depth sensor (f/2.4).
- Honor X20 was equipped with a triple-camera setup containing a 64 MP main sensor (f/1.8, PDAF), a 2 MP macro lens (f/2.4), and a 2 MP depth sensor (f/2.4).
- Honor Play 5 Youth Edition was featured a dual-camera system with a 64 MP main sensor (f/1.8, PDAF) and a 2 MP depth sensor (f/2.4).

The main camera configuration across all models supports video recording up to 1080p at 30fps. The front-facing selfie camera on these devices features a 16 MP resolution with an f/2.2 aperture and captures video at up to 1080p at 30fps.

=== Software ===
The Huawei Nova 8i was launched with EMUI 11 based on Android 10. Due to ongoing trade restrictions, it lacks Google Play Services, and software applications are instead provisioned through the AppGallery.

The Honor X20, Play 5 Youth Edition, and Honor 50 Lite shipped with Magic UI 4.2 based on Android 11. The Honor X20 and Play 5 Youth Edition were designed primarily for the mainland Chinese market and do not bundle Google Play Services, whereas the global Honor 50 Lite configuration fully includes Google ecosystem integration.
