= Honor 9X =

2019 Honor smartphone

- Brand: Honor
- Manufacturer: Huawei
- Type: Smartphone
- Series: Honor X
- First released: China: July 23, 2019
- Predecessor: Honor 8X
- Successor: Honor X10; Honor X9
- Compatible networks: GSM, HSPA, 4G (LTE)
- Dimensions: 163.5 mm (6.44 in) H 77.3 mm (3.04 in) W 8.8 mm (0.35 in) D
- Weight: 196.8 g (6.94 oz)
- Operating system: EMUI 9.1 compatible with Android 9
- System-on-chip: HiSilicon Kirin 710F
- CPU: Cortex-A73 (4 × 2.2 GHz); Cortex-A53 (4 × 1.7 GHz)
- GPU: Mali-G51 MP4
- Memory: 4 GB
- Storage: 128 GB
- Removable storage: microSD up to 512 GB
- Battery: 4000 mAh
- Rear camera: 48 MP (f/1.8); 20 MP (f/2.4) PDAF + 2 MP (f/2.4)
- Front camera: Pop-up; 16 MP (f/2.2)
- Display: 6.59" IPS LCD; 1080 × 2340 pixels (HONOR FullView)

The Honor 9X is a smartphone manufactured by Huawei under the Honor brand.

George Zhao announced that the smartphone will be unveiled in China on July 23, 2019 alongside the Honor 9X Pro. It was followed by the United Kingdom on November 14, 2019.

By model designation, the Honor 9X corresponds to the Huawei P Smart Z, with which it shares many technical specifications (processor, pop-up front camera, battery, etc.).

== Specifications ==
=== Design ===
The phone is available in two colors: Midnight Black and Sapphire Blue.

The device features a bezel-less design, with the screen occupying 91% of the front panel. The body is made of glass with aluminum frames.

The back panel of the Honor 9X in Sapphire Blue features a gradient color pattern with a large printed "X" that changes size depending on the viewing angle.

=== Hardware ===
The Honor 9X features a HiSilicon Kirin 710F processor, which includes four Cortex-A73 cores clocked at 2.2 GHz and four Cortex-A53 cores clocked at 1.7 GHz. The Chinese version of the phone runs on the Kirin 810 processor. It also has a built-in hardware-software GPU Turbo 3.0 technology.

The graphics processing unit is a Mali-G51 MP4.

Internal storage is 128 GB, expandable up to 512 GB using a microSD card. It comes with 4 GB of RAM.

The Honor 9X features a 6.59-inch LTPS (IPS LCD) screen with a resolution of 1080 × 2340 pixels, a pixel density of 391 ppi, and an aspect ratio of 19.5:9. The display incorporates TÜV Rheinland-certified technology to protect against harmful blue light.

The rear setup includes three camera modules: a 48 MP main camera (f/1.8), a 20 MP ultrawide sensor (f/2.4), and a 2 MP depth sensor (f/2.4). It records video in Full HD (1920 × 1080) with stereo sound.

The front pop-up camera is 16 MP with an f/2.2 aperture lens featuring 3D Portrait Lighting.

The non-removable Li-Po battery has a capacity of 4000 mAh.

=== Software ===
The Honor 9X runs on the Android 9 (Pie) operating system with the EMUI 9.1 interface.

Connectivity and interfaces include dual-band Wi-Fi 802.11 a/b/g/n/ac, Bluetooth 4.2 (A2DP, BLE, HWA, aptX/aptX HD), and NFC on the international version.

Navigation positioning features include GPS, GLONASS, BeiDou, and A-GPS.

It features a USB Type-C port and a 3.5 mm headphone jack.
