= Huawei Nova Y91 =

Android smartphone

Huawei Nova Y91 Huawei Nova 14i Huawei Enjoy 60X
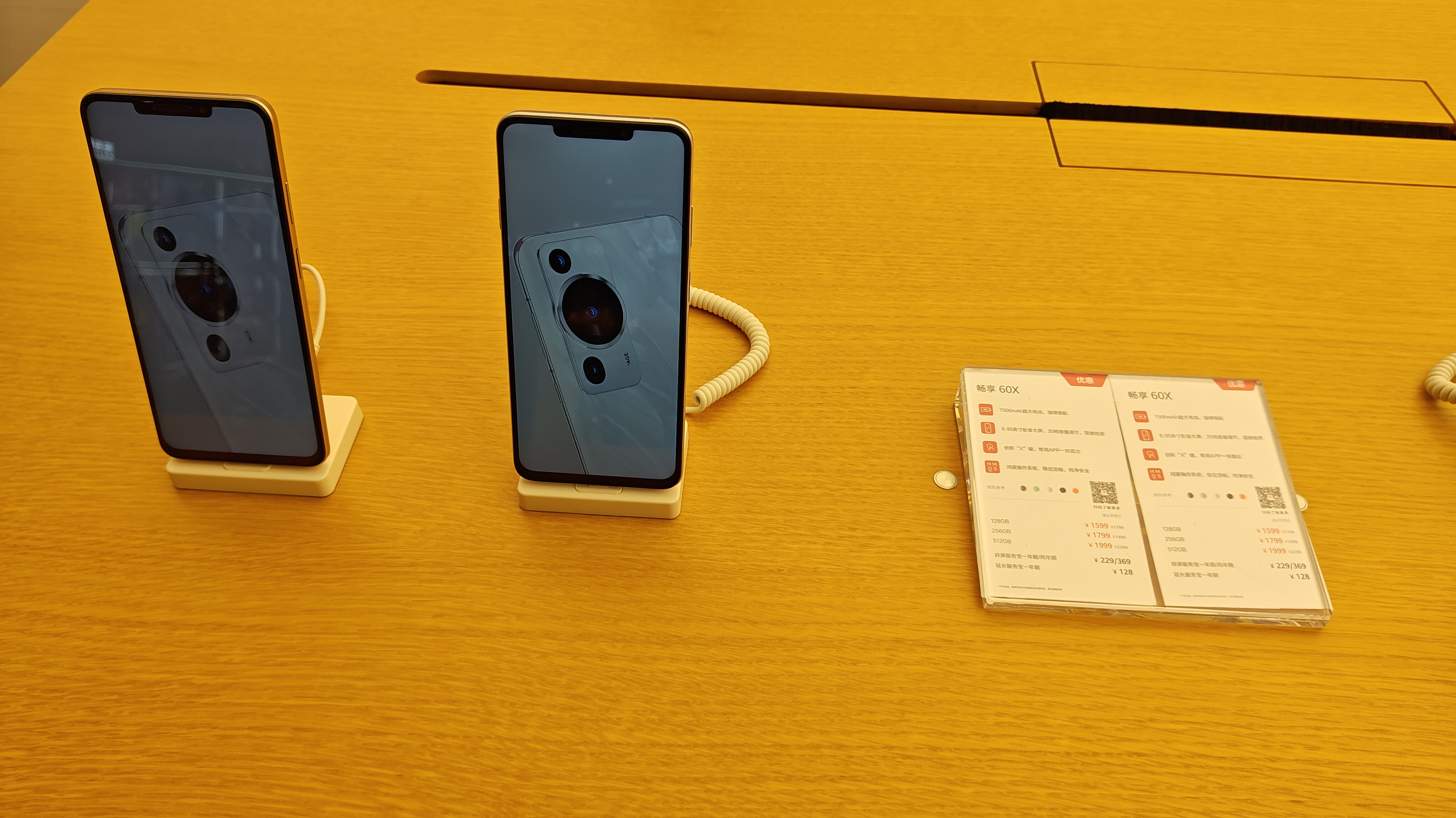
- Huawei Enjoy 60X
- Manufacturer: Huawei
- Type: Phablet
- Series: Nova / Enjoy
- First released: Enjoy 60X: April 17, 2023; 3 years ago Nova Y91: May 23, 2023; 3 years ago Nova 14i: October 8, 2025; 10 months ago
- Predecessor: Huawei Nova Y90; Huawei Nova 13i
- Successor: Huawei Enjoy 70X
- Related: Huawei Nova Y61; Huawei Nova Y71; Huawei Nova 14; Huawei Nova 14 Pro; Huawei Nova 14 Ultra; Huawei Nova 14 Lite; Huawei Enjoy 60 Pro
- Compatible networks: GSM, 3G, 4G (LTE)
- Form factor: Slate
- Colors: Nova Y91: Starry Black, Moonlight Silver; Nova 14i: Black, Blue; Enjoy 60X (128/256 GB): Obsidian Black, Moonlight Silver, Cold Jade Green; Enjoy 60X (512 GB): Gild Black, Orange Peel
- Dimensions: H: 171.6 mm W: 79.9 mm D: Nova Y91/Nova 14i/Enjoy 60X (128/256 GB): 8.9 mm Enjoy 60X (512 GB): 9.1 mm
- Weight: Nova Y91: 214 g Nova 14i/Enjoy 60X (128/256 GB): 216 g Enjoy 60X (512 GB): 219 g
- Operating system: Nova Y91: Initial: Android 12 (without Google Mobile Services) + EMUI 13; Current: Android 12 (without Google Mobile Services) + EMUI 14.2; Nova 14i: Android 12 (without Google Mobile Services) + EMUI 14.2; Enjoy 60X: Initial: HarmonyOS 3.0; Current: HarmonyOS 4.2
- System-on-chip: Qualcomm SM6225 Snapdragon 680 4G (6 nm)
- CPU: Octa-core (4×2.4 GHz Kryo 265 Gold & 4×1.9 GHz Kryo 265 Silver)
- GPU: Adreno 610
- Memory: Nova Y91: 6/8 GB; Nova 14i/Enjoy 60X: 8 GB; LPDDR4X
- Storage: Nova Y91/Nova 14i: 128/256 GB; Enjoy 60X: 128/256/512 GB; UFS 2.2
- SIM: Dual SIM (Nano-SIM)
- Battery: Non-removable Li-Po 7000 mAh
- Charging: 22.5 W fast charging Enjoy 60X (512 GB): 22.5 W reverse wired charging
- Rear camera: 50 MP, f/1.8, 26 mm (wide), 1/1.8", PDAF + 2 MP, f/2.4 (depth); LED flash, panorama, HDR; Video: 1080p@30fps
- Front camera: 8 MP, f/2.0 (wide); Video: 1080p@30fps
- Display: IPS LCD, 90 Hz, 6.95", 2388 × 1080 (FHD+), 19.8:9, 376 ppi
- Sound: Stereo speakers
- Connectivity: USB-C 2.0, Bluetooth 5.0 (A2DP, LE), NFC (Enjoy 60X), Wi-Fi 802.11 a/b/g/n/ac (dual-band, Wi-Fi Direct), GPS (A-GPS), GLONASS, BeiDou, Galileo, QZSS
- Data inputs: Fingerprint scanner (side-mounted), accelerometer, gyroscope, proximity sensor, compass
- Model: Nova Y91: STG-LX1, STG-LX2; Nova 14i: STG-LX2; Enjoy 60X: STG-AL00
- Codename: Stig

The Huawei Nova Y91 (stylized as HUAWEI nova Y91) is a mid-range budget phablet from the Nova series developed by Huawei. It was introduced on May 23, 2023. Additionally, on April 17, 2023, the Huawei Enjoy 60X was introduced in China, which mainly differs from the Nova Y91 by having an extra customizable physical button, additional color options, and NFC support.

On October 1, 2025, the Huawei Enjoy 60X was re-released in certain markets as the Huawei Nova 14i. It was released in Hong Kong on January 27, 2026.

== Design ==
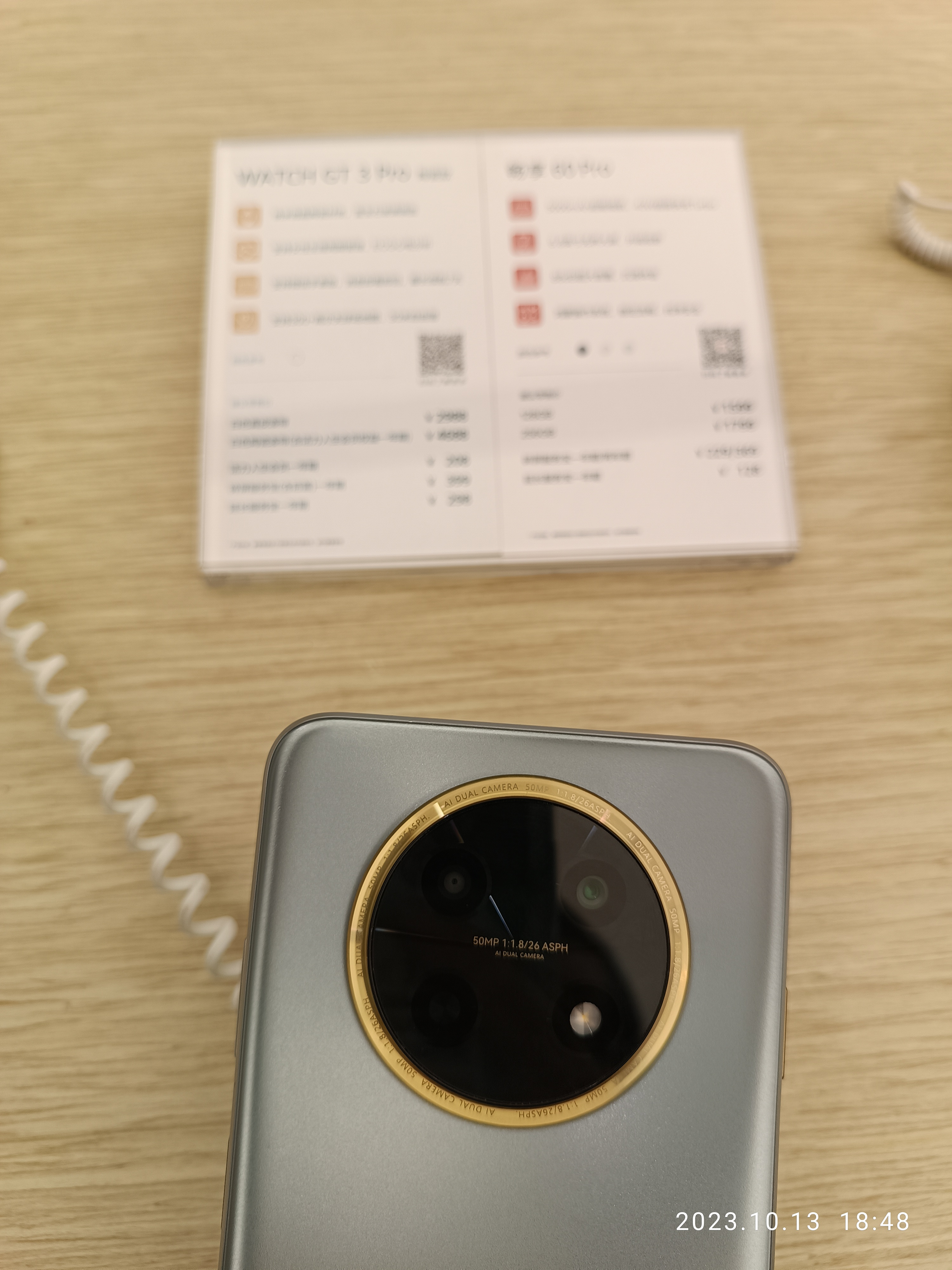
The camera module of the Huawei Enjoy 60X in Moonlight Silver

The front panel of the devices is made of glass, surrounded by a matte plastic frame. In terms of design, the front is also similar to iPhone. The back panel of the Huawei Nova Y91, Nova 14i, and the 128 GB or 256 GB variants of the Enjoy 60X is composed of matte plastic, while the 512 GB variant of the Enjoy 60X features a faux leather finish.

The bottom edge houses a dual Nano-SIM slot, a primary microphone, a USB-C port, and a loudspeaker grille, while the top edge features a secondary microphone. The right side contains the volume rocker and a power button that integrates a side-mounted fingerprint scanner. Exclusive to the Enjoy 60X and Nova 14i, the left side features an "X-Button" which can be mapped to quickly launch applications or toggle specific software features.

The Huawei Nova Y91 was sold in Starry Black and Moonlight Silver.

The 128 GB and 256 GB variants of the Huawei Enjoy 60X were distributed in three colors: Obsidian Black, Moonlight Silver, and Cold Jade Green, while its 512 GB counterpart was offered in Gild Black and Orange Peel.

The Huawei Nova 14i is available in Black and Blue options.

== Specifications ==
=== Hardware ===
The smartphones are powered by a Qualcomm Snapdragon 680 4G processor paired with an Adreno 610 GPU. The Huawei Nova Y91 was available in 6/128 GB, 8/128 GB, and 8/256 GB configurations; the Enjoy 60X comes in 8/128 GB, 8/256 GB, and 8/512 GB configurations; and the Nova 14i is sold in 8/128 GB and 8/256 GB tiers.

A standout feature across the lineup is a large 7000 mAh non-removable battery that supports fast charging up to 22.5 W. Furthermore, the 512 GB variant of the Huawei Enjoy 60X supports 22.5 W reverse wired charging to charge external equipment.

In the front, all modeled received a 6.95-inch IPS LCD display with a Full HD+ resolution (2388 × 1080), a 90 Hz refresh rate, a 376 ppi pixel density, and a 19.8:9 aspect ratio. The screen features a wide notch housing the proximity sensor, earpiece, and front-facing camera.

Audio is supported by a stereo speaker configuration where the earpiece speaker acts as the secondary channel.

The rear camera arrangement consists of a dual setup: a 50 MP wide-angle primary lens with a f/1.8 aperture and PDAF, coupled with a 2 MP depth sensor with a f/2.4 aperture. For selfies, an 8 MP wide-angle camera with a f/2.0 aperture is integrated on the front. Both the front and rear modules support video recording up to 1080p at 30fps.

=== Software ===
The Huawei Nova Y91 launched with EMUI 13 based on an open-source Android 12 platform without Google Mobile Services and was subsequently upgraded to EMUI 14.2. The Nova 14i shipped with EMUI 14.2 based on Android 12 out of the box. Meanwhile, the domestic Chinese Enjoy 60X debuted with HarmonyOS 3.0 and received subsequent updates to HarmonyOS 4.2.
