= Huawei P Smart 2019 =

2019 LTE smartphone

- Manufacturer: Huawei
- Type: Smartphone
- Series: Huawei P
- First released: January 11, 2019
- Predecessor: Huawei P Smart
- Successor: Huawei P Smart 2020
- Related: Huawei P Smart+ 2019
- Compatible networks: GSM; HSDPA; LTE
- Form factor: Slate
- Colors: Midnight Black, Aurora Blue, Sapphire Blue, Coral Red
- Dimensions: 155.2×73.4×7.95 mm (6.110×2.890×0.313 in)
- Weight: 160 g (6 oz)
- Operating system: Android 9 Pie, EMUI 9.0
- CPU: HiSilicon Kirin 710
- Memory: 3 GB RAM
- Storage: 64 GB
- Removable storage: up to 512 GB
- Battery: 3400 mAh
- Rear camera: Rear: 13 MP (f/1.8) + 2 MP; Front: 8 MP
- Display: 6.21" IPS; 1080 x 2340 px (FullHD+); 415 ppi
- Connectivity: Wi-Fi (802.11 a/b/g/n); Bluetooth 4.2, A2DP, LTE; NFC
- Data inputs: Multi-touch touchscreen
- Other: Accelerometer; Gyroscope; Proximity sensor Digital compass Face unlock FM radio

Huawei P Smart 2019 is a smartphone from the Huawei P lineup series, announced by Huawei in December 2018. It is the successor to the model also released in 2018, the Huawei P Smart.

== Availability & Pricing ==
In Europe, the starting price was 250 USD, with sales beginning on January 2, 2019. In Ukraine, the Huawei P Smart 2019 went on sale at the end of December 2018 for 6499 UAH.

== Design & Build ==
The device features an IPS matrix display with a 6.21-inch diagonal and a resolution of 2340x1080 (Full HD+), which the manufacturer calls the "Dewdrop Display." The screen supports Eye Comfort mode to reduce the negative impact of blue light on the eyes.

The device is available in two colors: Black and Aurora Blue. The body is made of plastic with minimal bezels. A key feature of the phone is the display with a teardrop notch.

With dimensions at 73.4 ×155.2 mm × 7.95 mm, it has an aspect ratio of 19.5:9 and weights at 160g.

== Specifications ==
=== Hardware ===
The smartphone is powered by the HiSilicon Kirin 710 chipset. Huawei's proprietary central processor includes four Cortex-A73 (64-bit) cores clocked at 2.2 GHz and four Cortex-A53 (64-bit) cores at 1.7 GHz. The graphics core is the ARM Mali-G51 MP4. It has a non-removable Li-Ion 3400 mAh battery.

It has an internal storage is 64 GB, with expandable storage up to 512 GB and a 3GB RAM.

The main camera is a dual 13 + 2 MP setup with an f/1.8 aperture, autofocus, and Bokeh effect. The front camera is 8 MP (f/2.0) for photos with Bokeh effects and face recognition functionality.

This model includes an NFC module for contactless payments via Google Pay.

=== Software ===
The Huawei P Smart 2019 runs on the Android 9 (Pie) operating system with the EMUI 9.0 skin.
