= Huawei Nova 8 =

Smartphone manufactured by Huawei

Huawei Nova 8 Huawei Nova 8 5G
- Manufacturer: Huawei
- Type: Smartphone
- Series: The nova series
- First released: August 5, 2021; 5 years ago
- Predecessor: Huawei Nova 7
- Successor: Huawei Nova 9
- Related: Huawei Nova 8 Pro; Huawei Nova 8i HONOR V40 lite
- Compatible networks: Nova 8: GSM / HSPA / LTE; Nova 8 5G: GSM / CDMA / HSPA / LTE / 5G
- Form factor: Slate
- Dimensions: 160.1 mm (6.30 in) H 74.1 mm (2.92 in) W 7.6 mm (0.30 in) D
- Weight: 169 g (6.0 oz)
- Operating system: Android 11, EMUI 12 (no Google Play Services)
- System-on-chip: Nova 8: Kirin 820E (7nm); Nova 8 5G: Kirin 985 5G (7 nm)
- CPU: Nova 8: Hexa-core (3x2.22 GHz Cortex-A76 & 3x1.84 GHz Cortex-A55); Nova 8 5G: Octa-core (1x2.58 GHz Cortex-A76 & 3x2.40 GHz Cortex-A76 & 4x1.84 GHz Cortex-A55)
- GPU: Nova 8: Mali-G57 (6-core); Nova 8 5G: Mali-G77 (8-core)
- Memory: 8 GB RAM
- Storage: 128 GB, 256 GB
- Removable storage: None
- SIM: Single SIM (Nano-SIM) or Dual SIM (Nano-SIM, dual stand-by)
- Battery: 3800 mAh
- Charging: Fast charging 66W
- Rear camera: 64 MP, f/1.9, 26mm (wide), PDAF; 8 MP, f/2.4, 120˚, 17mm (ultrawide); 2 MP, f/2.4, (depth); 2 MP, f/2.4, (macro); LED flash, panorama, HDR; 4K, 1080p, 720p@960fps, gyro-EIS
- Front camera: 32 MP, f/2.0, 26mm (wide); 4K video recording
- Display: 6.57 in (167 mm); 1080 x 2340 pixels, 19.5:9 ratio (~392 ppi density); OLED, 1B colors, HDR10, 90Hz refresh rate
- Sound: Loudspeaker-mono
- Connectivity: Wi-Fi 802.11 a/b/g/n/ac, dual-band, Wi-Fi Direct, hotspot Bluetooth 5.0, A2DP, LE; A-GPS, GLONASS, BDS, GALILEO, QZSS
- Data inputs: Multi-touch screen USB Type-C 2.0
- Water resistance: No official test done
- Website: consumer.huawei.com/en/phones/nova8/

Huawei Nova 8 is a smartphone manufactured by Huawei. It is a part of Huawei Nova series. It was announced on August 5, 2021.
