= Huawei Y6p =

Budget smartphone smartphone by Huawei

- Manufacturer: Huawei
- Series: Y series
- First released: May 6, 2020; 6 years ago
- Predecessor: Huawei Y6s
- Successor: Huawei Nova Y60
- Form factor: Slate
- Dimensions: 159.1 mm × 74.1 mm × 9 mm (6.26 in × 2.92 in × 0.35 in)
- Weight: 185 g (6.5 oz)
- Operating system: EMUI 10.1 Based on Android 10
- System-on-chip: Mediatek Helio P22
- CPU: Octa-core (4x2.0 GHz Cortex-A53 & 4x1.5 GHz Cortex-A53)
- GPU: PowerVR GE8320
- Memory: 3GB RAM, 4GB RAM (region dependent)
- Storage: 64GB ROM
- Removable storage: microSDXC (Up to 512gb expandable storage)
- SIM: nanoSIM
- Battery: 5000mAh
- Charging: 10W Standard Charging
- Rear camera: Triple Camera: 13 MP, f/1.8, (wide) + PDAF 5 MP, f/2.2, 120˚ (ultrawide)+ 2 MP, f/2.4 (depth)
- Front camera: 8 MP, f/2.0 (wide)
- Display: 6.3 in (160 mm) 720x1600 IPS LCD, 278ppi
- Codename: Modena B2 (Y6p)
- Made in: China
- Website: consumer.huawei.com/ph/phones/y6p

Huawei Y6p (also known as Huawei Y6p 2020 or Honor Play 9A) is an Android smartphone manufactured by Huawei. Unveiled on 6 May 2020, they succeed the Huawei Y6s in the company's Y series line.

== Specifications ==
=== Hardware ===
The Huawei Y6p is powered by 4x2.0 GHz Cortex-A53 & 4x1.5 GHz Cortex-A53 octa-core processors with Mediatek Helio P22 chipset. It has a Dual-sim slot and comes equipped with 64 GB of ROM and up to 512 GB additional memory via MicroSD for extra storage. The Huawei Y6p operates on EMUI 10.1 based on Android 10.

=== Memory ===
The Huawei Y6p has 64 GB of built in memory and a dedicated Micro SD slot which supports up to 512 GB.

=== Display ===
The Huawei Y6p features a 6.5-inch (160mm) screen with a 1600 by 720 pixels resolution and an 81.3% screen-to-body ratio.

=== Battery ===
The Huawei Y6p is equipped with a Non-removable 5000 mAh Li-Po battery with reverse charging capability.

=== Camera ===
The Huawei Y6p has a triple-camera setup on the rear camera, including a 13 MP main camera, a 5 MP ultrawide camera, and a 2 MP depth sensor. While the front camera has an 8 MP wide camera.

== Software ==
The Huawei Y6p is equipped with EMUI 10.1 which is based on the Android 10 operating system.

Due to the ongoing United States sanctions against Huawei, the models of the Y6p did not ship with, or support, Google Mobile Services—the proprietary software suite (including Google Play-branded software) shipped on certified Android devices. Huawei was also not allowed to market the device using the Android trademark.
