= List of Realme products =

Realme logo

realme first started releasing its products as a sub-brand of Oppo from March 2018.

This is a list of products developed by Realme.

== Home and other technology ==
Realme offered different products, from air purifiers, headphones, and smartwatches, to TVs.

- Laptops - Realme launched its first ever laptop named Realme Book Slim, alongside Realme GT Master Edition.
- Realme TechLife - Realme also has various products that suits people's lifestyles, including beard removals, electric toothbrushes, air conditioners, smartwatches, tripods, power banks, Bluetooth speakers, earbuds, hair dryers, tablets, vacuum cleaners, cameras and smart scales.

== Realme UI ==
Realme UI is a user interface created by Realme for its smartphones and tablet computers. It is mostly based on Oppo's ColorOS user interface, which, in turn, is based on Android.

Realme UI was announced in January 2020 and initially was based on ColorOS 7.0, which was built on Android 10. Also, realme UI had some variations like realme UI Go Edition, which is based on Android Go, and Realme UI R-T Editions, which were simplified versions of Realme UI examples: Realme UI 5, Realme UI 6 ETC

== Smartphones ==
=== Number Series ===
The Number Series is a line of budget and mid-range Realme smartphones. It started in May 2018 with the announcement of the Realme 1.

Model	Model number	Release date	Display type	Display size	Display resolution	5G support	SoC	GPU	RAM	Internal Storage	Camera		Battery	Charging	Operating system	
Model	Model number	Release date	Display type	Display size	Display resolution	5G support	SoC	GPU	RAM	Internal Storage	Rear	Front	Battery	Charging	Initial	Latest
Realme 1Also: Oppo F7 Youth China: Oppo A73s	CPH1859; CPH1861	May 2018	IPS LCD Corning Gorilla Glass 3	6.0"	1080 x 2160 (~402 ppi)	No	MediaTek Helio P60 4x 2.0 GHz Cortex-A73 + 4x 2.0 GHz Cortex-A53	Mali-G72 MP3 @800 MHz	3 GB; 4 GB; 6 GB (LPDDR4X)	32 GB; 64 GB; 128 GB (eMMC 5.1)	13 MP, f/2.2	8 MP, f/2.2	3410 mAh (Li-Ion)	microUSB, 10 W	Android 8.1 (ColorOS 5.2)	Android 9 (ColorOS 6.0)
Realme 2Also: Oppo A5, Oppo AX5	RMX1805; RMX1809	September 2018	IPS LCD Corning Gorilla Glass 3	6.2"	720 x 1520 (~271 ppi)	No	Qualcomm Snapdragon 450 8x 1.8 GHz Cortex-A53	Adreno 506 @600 MHz	3 GB; 4 GB (LPDDR3)	32 GB; 64 GB (eMMC 5.1)	13 MP, f/2.2 + 2 MP, f/2.4 (depth)	8 MP, f/2.2	4230 mAh (Li-Ion)	microUSB, 10 W	Android 8.1 (ColorOS 5.1)	Android 9 (ColorOS 6.0)
Realme 2 Pro	RMX1801; RMX1803; RMX1807	October 2018	IPS LCD Corning Gorilla Glass 3	6.3"	1080 x 2340 (~409 ppi)	No	Qualcomm Snapdragon 660 4x 2.2 GHz Cortex-A73 + 4x 1.84 GHz Cortex-A53	Adreno 512	4 GB; 6 GB; 8 GB (LPDDR4)	64 GB; 128 GB (eMMC 5.1)	16 MP, f/1.7 + 2 MP (depth)	16 MP, f/2.0	3500 mAh (Li-Ion)	microUSB, 10 W	Android 8.1 (ColorOS 5.2)	Android 10 (Realme UI 1.0)
Realme 3	RMX1821; RMX1825	March 2019	IPS LCD Corning Gorilla Glass 3	6.22"	720 x 1520 (~270 ppi)	No	MediaTek Helio P60 (Global); 4x 2.0 GHz Cortex-A73 + 4x 2.0 GHz Cortex-A53 MediaTek Helio P70 (India); 4x 2.1 GHz Cortex-A73 + 4x 2.0 GHz Cortex-A53	Mali-G72 MP3 @800 MHz (Global) @900 MHz (India)	3 GB; 4 GB (LPDDR4X)	32 GB; 64 GB (eMMC 5.1)	13 MP, f/1.8 + 2 MP (depth)	13 MP, f/2.0	4230 mAh	microUSB, 10 W	Android 9 (ColorOS 6.0)	Android 10 (Realme UI 1.0)
Realme 3 Pro China: Realme X Lite	RMX1851	May 2019	IPS LCD Corning Gorilla Glass 5	6.3"	1080 x 2340 (~409 ppi)	No	Qualcomm Snapdragon 710 2x 2.2 GHz Cortex-A75 + 6x 1.7 GHz Cortex-A55	Adreno 616 @750 MHz	4 GB; 6 GB (LPDDR4X)	64 GB; 128 GB (eMMC 5.1)	16 MP, f/1.7 + 5 MP, f/2.4 (depth)	25 MP, f/2.0	4045 mAh	microUSB, 20 W	Android 9 (ColorOS 6.0)	Android 11 (Realme UI 2.0)
Realme 3i	RMX1827	July 2019	IPS LCD Corning Gorilla Glass 3	6.2"	720 x 1520 (~271 ppi)	No	MediaTek Helio P60 4x 2.0 GHz Cortex-A73 + 4x 2.0 GHz Cortex-A53	Mali-G72 MP3 @800 MHz	3 GB; 4 GB (LPDDR4X)	32 GB; 64 GB (eMMC 5.1)	13 MP, f/1.8 + 2 MP (depth)	13 MP, f/2.0	4230 mAh	microUSB, 10 W	Android 9 (ColorOS 6.0)	Android 10 (Realme UI 1.0)
Realme 5	RMX1911, RMX1919; RMX1927	August 2019	IPS LCD	6.5"	720 x 1600 (~269 ppi)	No	Qualcomm Snapdragon 665 4x 2.0 GHz Cortex-A73 + 4x 1.8 GHz Cortex-A53	Adreno 610 @950 MHz	3 GB; 4 GB	32 GB; 64 GB; 128 GB	12 MP, f/1.8 + 8 MP, f/2.2 (ultrawide) + 2 MP, f/2.4 (macro) + 2 MP, f/2.4 (depth)	13 MP, f/2.0	5000 mAh (Li-Po)	microUSB, 10 W	Android 9 (ColorOS 6.0)	Android 10 (Realme UI 1.0)
Realme 5 ProChina: Q	RMX1971; RMX1973	September 2019	IPS LCD	6.3"	1080 x 2340 (~409 ppi)	No	Qualcomm Snapdragon 712 2x 2.3 GHz Cortex-A75 + 6x 1.7 GHz Cortex-A55	Adreno 616 @750 MHz	4 GB; 6 GB; 8 GB (LPDDR4X)	64 GB; 128 GB (UFS 2.1)	48 MP, f/1.8 + 8 MP, f/2.2 (ultrawide) + 2 MP, f/2.4 (macro) + 2 MP, f/2.4 (depth)	16 MP, f/2.0	4035 mAh (Li-Po)	USB-C, 20 W	Android 9 (ColorOS 6.0)	Android 11 (Realme UI 2.0)
Realme 5s	RMX1925	November 2019	IPS LCD	6.5"	720 x 1600 (~269 ppi)	No	Qualcomm Snapdragon 665 4x 2.0 GHz Cortex-A73 + 4x 1.8 GHz Cortex-A53	Adreno 610 @950 MHz	4 GB	64 GB; 128 GB	48 MP, f/1.8 + 8 MP, f/2.2 (ultrawide) + 2 MP, f/2.4 (macro) + 2 MP, f/2.4 (depth)	13 MP, f/2.0	5000 mAh (Li-Po)	microUSB, 10 W	Android 9 (ColorOS 6.0)	Android 10 (Realme UI 1.0)
Realme 5i	RMX2030; RMX2032	January 2020	IPS LCD	6.52"	720 x 1600 (~269 ppi)	No	Qualcomm Snapdragon 665 4x 2.0 GHz Cortex-A73 + 4x 1.8 GHz Cortex-A53	Adreno 610 @950 MHz	3 GB; 4 GB	32 GB; 64 GB; 128 GB	12 MP, f/1.8 + 8 MP, f/2.3 (ultrawide) + 2 MP, f/2.4 (macro) + 2 MP, f/2.4 (depth)	8 MP, f/2.0	5000 mAh (Li-Po)	microUSB, 10 W	Android 9 (ColorOS 6.0)	Android 10 (Realme UI 1.0)
Realme 6	RMX2001	March 2020	IPS LCD, 90 Hz Corning Gorilla Glass 3	6.5"	1080 x 2400 (~405 ppi)	No	MediaTek Helio G90T 2x 2.05 GHz Cortex-A76 + 6x 2.0 GHz Cortex-A55	Mali-G76 MC4 @800 MHz	4 GB; 6 GB; 8 GB (LPDDR4X)	64 GB; 128 GB (UFS 2.1)	64 MP, f/1.8 + 8 MP, f/2.3 (ultrawide) + 2 MP, f/2.4 (macro) + 2 MP, f/2.4 (depth)	16 MP, f/2.0	4300 mAh (Li-Po)	USB-C, 30 W	Android 10 (Realme UI 1.0)	Android 11 (Realme UI 2.0)
Realme 6 Pro	RMX2061; RMX2063	March 2020	IPS LCD, 90 Hz Corning Gorilla Glass 5	6.6"	1080 x 2400 (~399 ppi)	No	Qualcomm Snapdragon 720G 2x 2.3 GHz Cortex-A76 + 6x 1.8 GHz Cortex-A55	Adreno 618 @700 MHz	6 GB; 8 GB (LPDDR4X)	64 GB; 128 GB (UFS 2.1)	64 MP, f/1.8 + 12 MP, f/2.5 (telephoto) + 8 MP, f/2.3 (ultrawide) + 2 MP, f/2.4 (macro)	16 MP, f/2.1 + 8 MP, f/2.2 (ultrawide)	4300 mAh (Li-Po)	USB-C, 30 W	Android 10 (Realme UI 1.0)	Android 11 (Realme UI 2.0)
Realme 6i	RMX2040	March 2020	IPS LCD Corning Gorilla Glass 3	6.5"	720 x 1600 (~269 ppi)	No	MediaTek Helio G80 2x 2.0 GHz Cortex-A75 + 6x 1.8 GHz Cortex-A55	Mali-G52 MC2	3 GB; 4 GB (LPDDR4X)	64 GB; 128 GB (eMMC 5.1)	48 MP, f/1.8 + 8 MP, f/2.3 (ultrawide) + 2 MP, f/2.4 (macro) + 2 MP, f/2.4 (depth)	16 MP, f/2.0	5000 mAh (Li-Po)	USB-C, 18 W	Android 10 (Realme UI 1.0)	Android 11 (Realme UI 2.0)
Realme 6s	RMX2002	June 2020	IPS LCD, 90 Hz Corning Gorilla Glass 3	6.5"	1080 x 2400 (~405 ppi)	No	MediaTek Helio G90T 2x 2.05 GHz Cortex-A76 + 6x 2.0 GHz Cortex-A55	Mali-G76 MC4 @800 MHz	4 GB; 6 GB (LPDDR4X)	64 GB; 128 GB (UFS 2.1)	48 MP, f/1.8 + 8 MP, f/2.3 (ultrawide) + 2 MP, f/2.4 (macro) + 2 MP, f/2.4 (depth)	16 MP, f/2.0	4300 mAh (Li-Po)	USB-C, 30 W	Android 10 (Realme UI 1.0)	Android 11 (Realme UI 2.0)
Realme 6i (India)		July 2020	IPS LCD, 90 Hz Corning Gorilla Glass 3	6.5"		No	MediaTek Helio G90T 2x 2.05 GHz Cortex-A76 + 6x 2.0 GHz Cortex-A55	Mali-G76 MC4 @800 MHz	4 GB; 6 GB (LPDDR4X)	64 GB (UFS 2.1)	48 MP, f/1.8 + 8 MP, f/2.3 (ultrawide) + 2 MP, f/2.4 (macro) + 2 MP, f/2.4 (depth)	16 MP, f/2.0	4300 mAh (Li-Po)	USB-C, 30 W	Android 10 (Realme UI 1.0)	Android 11 (Realme UI 2.0)
Realme 7 (Asia)	RMX2151; RMX2163	September 2020	IPS LCD, 90 Hz Corning Gorilla Glass 3	6.5"	1080 x 2400 (~405 ppi)	No	MediaTek Helio G95 2x 2.05 GHz Cortex-A76 + 6x 2.0 GHz Cortex-A55	Mali-G76 MC4 @900 MHz	6 GB; 8 GB (LPDDR4X)	64 GB; 128 GB (UFS 2.1)	64 MP, f/1.8 + 8 MP, f/2.3 (ultrawide) + 2 MP, f/2.4 (macro) + 2 MP, f/2.4 (depth)	16 MP, f/2.1	5000 mAh (Li-Po)	USB-C, 30 W	Android 10 (Realme UI 1.0)	Android 12 (Realme UI 3.0)
Realme 7i (Asia)	RMX2103	September 2020	IPS LCD, 90 Hz	6.5"	720 x 1600 (~270 ppi)	No	Qualcomm Snapdragon 662 4x 2.0 GHz Cortex-A73 + 4x 1.8 GHz Cortex-A53	Adreno 610 @750 MHz	4 GB; 8 GB	64 GB; 128 GB (UFS 2.1)	64 MP, f/1.8 + 8 MP, f/2.3 (ultrawide) + 2 MP, f/2.4 (macro) + 2 MP, f/2.4 (depth)	16 MP, f/2.1	5000 mAh (Li-Po)	USB-C, 18 W	Android 10 (Realme UI 1.0)	Android 11 (Realme UI 2.0)
Realme 7 Pro	RMX2170	September 2020	Super AMOLED	6.4"	1080 x 2400 (~411 ppi)	No	Qualcomm Snapdragon 720G 2x 2.3 GHz Cortex-A76 + 6x 1.8 GHz Cortex-A55	Adreno 618 @700 MHz	6 GB; 8 GB (LPDDR4X)	128 GB (UFS 2.1)	64 MP, f/1.8 + 8 MP, f/2.3 (ultrawide) + 2 MP, f/2.4 (macro) + 2 MP, f/2.4 (depth)	32 MP, f/2.5	4500 mAh (Li-Po)	USB-C, 65 W	Android 10 (Realme UI 1.0)	Android 12 (Realme UI 3.0)
Realme 7 (Global)	RMX2155	October 2020	IPS LCD, 90 Hz Corning Gorilla Glass 3	6.5"	1080 x 2400 (~405 ppi)	No	MediaTek Helio G95 2x 2.05 GHz Cortex-A76 + 6x 2.0 GHz Cortex-A55	Mali-G76 MC4 @900 MHz	4 GB; 6 GB; 8 GB (LPDDR4X)	64 GB; 128 GB (UFS 2.1)	48 MP, f/1.8 + 8 MP, f/2.3 (ultrawide) + 2 MP, f/2.4 (macro) + 2 MP, f/2.4 (depth)	16 MP, f/2.1	5000 mAh (Li-Po)	USB-C, 30 W	Android 10 (Realme UI 1.0)	Android 12 (Realme UI 3.0)
Realme 7 5G	RMX2111	November 2020	IPS LCD, 120 Hz	6.5"	1080 x 2400 (~405 ppi)	Yes	MediaTek Dimensity 800U 2x 2.4 GHz Cortex-A76 + 6x 2.0 GHz Cortex-A55	Mali-G57 MC3 @850 MHz	6 GB; 8 GB (LPDDR4X)	128 GB (UFS 2.1)	48 MP, f/1.8 + 8 MP, f/2.3 (ultrawide) + 2 MP, f/2.4 (macro) + 2 MP, f/2.4 (depth)	16 MP, f/2.1	5000 mAh (Li-Po)	USB-C, 30 W	Android 10 (Realme UI 1.0)	Android 12 (Realme UI 3.0)
Realme 7i (Global)		December 2020	IPS LCD	6.5"	720 x 1600 (~270 ppi)	No	MediaTek Helio G85 2x 2.0 GHz Cortex-A75 + 6x 1.8 GHz Cortex-A55	Mali-G52 MC2 @1 GHz	4 GB (LPDDR4X)	128 GB (eMMC 5.1)	48 MP, f/1.8 + 8 MP, f/2.3 (ultrawide) + 2 MP, f/2.4 (macro)	8 MP, f/2.0	6000 mAh (Li-Po)	USB-C, 18 W	Android 10 (Realme UI 1.0)	Android 11 (Realme UI 2.0)
Realme 8	RMX3085	March 2021	Super AMOLED	6.43"	1080 x 2400 (~411 ppi)	No	MediaTek Helio G95 2x 2.05 GHz Cortex-A76 + 6x 2.0 GHz Cortex-A55	Mali-G76 MC4 @900 MHz	4 GB; 6 GB; 8 GB (LPDDR4X)	64 GB; 128 GB (UFS 2.1)	64 MP, f/1.8 + 8 MP, f/2.3 (ultrawide) + 2 MP, f/2.4 (macro) + 2 MP, f/2.4 (depth)	16 MP, f/2.5	5000 mAh (Li-Po)	USB-C, 30 W	Android 11 (Realme UI 2.0)	Android 13 (Realme UI 4.0)
Realme 8 Pro	RMX3081	March 2021	Super AMOLED	6.43"	1080 x 2400 (~411 ppi)	No	Qualcomm Snapdragon 720G 2x 2.3 GHz Cortex-A76 + 6x 1.8 GHz Cortex-A55	Adreno 618 @700 MHz	6 GB; 8 GB (LPDDR4X)	128 GB (UFS 2.1)	108 MP, f/1.9 + 8 MP, f/2.3 (ultrawide) + 2 MP, f/2.4 (macro) + 2 MP, f/2.4 (depth)	16 MP, f/2.5	4500 mAh (Li-Po)	USB-C, 50 W	Android 11 (Realme UI 2.0)	Android 13 (Realme UI 4.0)
Realme 8 5G Also: narzo 30 5G China: Q3i	RMX3241	April 2021	IPS LCD, 90 Hz	6.5"	1080 x 2400 (~405 ppi)	Yes	MediaTek Dimensity 700 2x 2.2 GHz Cortex-A76 + 6x 2.0 GHz Cortex-A55	Mali-G57 MC2 @950 MHz	4 GB; 6 GB; 8 GB (LPDDR4X)	64 GB; 128 GB (UFS 2.1)	48 MP, f/1.8 + 2 MP, f/2.4 (macro) + 2 MP, f/2.4 (depth)	16 MP, f/2.1	5000 mAh (Li-Po)	USB-C, 18 W	Android 11 (Realme UI 2.0)	Android 13 (Realme UI 4.0)
Realme 8s 5G	RMX3381	September 2021	IPS LCD, 90 Hz	6.5"	1080 x 2400 (~405 ppi)	Yes	MediaTek Dimensity 810 2x 2.4 GHz Cortex-A76 + 6x 2.0 GHz Cortex-A55	Mali-G57 MC2 @950 MHz	6 GB; 8 GB (LPDDR4X)	128 GB (UFS 2.1)	64 MP, f/1.8 + 2 MP, f/2.4 (macro) + 2 MP, f/2.4 (depth)	16 MP, f/2.1	5000 mAh (Li-Po)	USB-C, 33 W	Android 11 (Realme UI 2.0)	Android 13 (Realme UI 4.0)
Realme 8i Also: narzo 50	RMX3151	September 2021	IPS LCD, 120 Hz	6.6"	1080 x 2412 (~400 ppi)	No	MediaTek Helio G96 2x 2.05 GHz Cortex-A76 + 6x 2.0 GHz Cortex-A55	Mali-G57 MC2 @950 MHz	4 GB; 6 GB (LPDDR4X)	64 GB; 128 GB (UFS 2.1)	50 MP, f/1.8 + 2 MP, f/2.4 (macro) + 2 MP, f/2.4 (depth)	16 MP, f/2.1	5000 mAh (Li-Po)	USB-C, 18 W	Android 11 (Realme UI 2.0)	Android 13 (Realme UI 4.0)
Realme 9i	RMX3491	January 2022	IPS LCD, 90 Hz Dragontrail Pro Glass	6.6"	1080 x 2412 (~400 ppi)	No	Qualcomm Snapdragon 680 4x 2.4 GHz Cortex-A73 + 4x 1.9 GHz Cortex-A53	Adreno 610	4 GB; 6 GB (LPDDR4X)	64 GB; 128 GB (UFS 2.1 - India) (UFS 2.2 - Vietnam)	50 MP, f/1.8 + 2 MP, f/2.4 (macro) + 2 MP, f/2.4 (depth)	16 MP, f/2.1	5000 mAh (Li-Po)	USB-C, 33 W	Android 11 (Realme UI 2.0)	Android 13 (Realme UI 4.0)
Realme 9 Pro China: V25	RMX3471; RMX3472	February 2022	IPS LCD, 120 Hz	6.6"	1080 x 2412 (~400 ppi)	Yes	Qualcomm Snapdragon 695 4x 2.2 GHz Cortex-A78 + 4x 1.7 GHz Cortex-A55	Adreno 619	6 GB; 8 GB (LPDDR4X)	128 GB (UFS 2.2)	64 MP, f/1.8 + 8 MP, f/2.2 (ultrawide) + 2 MP, f/2.4 (macro)	16 MP, f/2.1	5000 mAh (Li-Po)	USB-C, 33 W	Android 12 (Realme UI 3.0)	Android 14 (Realme UI 5.0)
Realme 9 Pro+	RMX3392; RMX3393	February 2022	Super AMOLED, 90 Hz Corning Gorilla Glass 5	6.4"	1080 x 2400 (~411 ppi)	Yes	MediaTek Dimensity 920 2x 2.5 GHz Cortex-A78 + 6x 2.0 GHz Cortex-A55	Mali-G68 MC4 @950 MHz	6 GB; 8 GB	128 GB; 256 GB (UFS 2.2)	50 MP, f/1.8 + 8 MP, f/2.2 (ultrawide) + 2 MP, f/2.4 (macro)	16 MP, f/2.4	4500 mAh (Li-Po)	USB-C, 60 W	Android 12 (Realme UI 3.0)	Android 14 (Realme UI 5.0)
Realme 9 5G Speed Edition China: Q3s / Q3t	RMX3461	March 2022	IPS LCD, 144 Hz Panda Glass	6.6"	1080 x 2412 (~400 ppi)	Yes	Qualcomm Snapdragon 778G 1x 2.4 GHz Cortex-A78 + 3x 2.2 GHz Cortex-A78 + 4x 1.9 GHz Cortex-A55	Adreno 642L @490 MHz	6 GB; 8 GB (LPDDR4X)	128 GB (UFS 2.2)	48 MP, f/1.8 + 2 MP, f/2.4 (macro) + 2 MP, f/2.4 (depth)	16 MP, f/2.1	5000 mAh (Li-Po)	USB-C, 30 W	Android 11 (Realme UI 2.0)	Android 13 (Realme UI 4.0)
Realme 9 5G (India)	RMX3388	March 2022	IPS LCD, 90 Hz	6.5"	1080 x 2400 (~405 ppi)	Yes	MediaTek Dimensity 810 2x 2.4 GHz Cortex-A76 + 6x 2.0 GHz Cortex-A55	Mali-G57 MC2 @950 MHz	4 GB; 6 GB (LPDDR4X)	64 GB; 128 GB (UFS 2.2)	48 MP, f/1.8 + 2 MP, f/2.4 (macro) + 2 MP, f/2.4 (depth)	16 MP, f/2.1	5000 mAh (Li-Po)	USB-C, 18 W	Android 11 (Realme UI 2.0)	Android 13 (Realme UI 4.0)
Realme 9	RMX3521	April 2022	Super AMOLED, 90 Hz Corning Gorilla Glass 5	6.43"	1080 x 2400 (~411 ppi)	No	Qualcomm Snapdragon 680 4x 2.4 GHz Cortex-A73 + 4x 1.9 GHz Cortex-A53	Adreno 610	6 GB; 8 GB (LPDDR4X)	128 GB (UFS 2.2)	108 MP, f/1.8 + 8 MP, f/2.2 (ultrawide) + 2 MP, f/2.4 (macro)	16 MP, f/2.1	5000 mAh (Li-Po)	USB-C, 33 W	Android 12 (Realme UI 3.0)	Android 14 (Realme UI 5.0)
Realme 9 5G	RMX3474	June 2022	IPS LCD, 120 Hz	6.6"	1080 x 2412 (~400 ppi)	Yes	Qualcomm Snapdragon695 4x 2.2 GHz Cortex-A78 + 4x 1.7 GHz Cortex-A55	Adreno 619	4 GB (LPDDR4X)	64 GB; 128 GB (UFS 2.2)	50 MP, f/1.8 + 2 MP, f/2.4 (macro) + 2 MP, f/2.4 (depth)	16 MP, f/2.1	5000 mAh (Li-Po)	USB-C, 18 W	Android 12 (Realme UI 3.0)	Android 14 (Realme UI 5.0)
Realme 9i 5G	RMX3612	August 2022	IPS LCD, 120 Hz	6.6"	1080 x 2408 (~400 ppi)	Yes	MediaTek Dimensity 810 2x 2.4 GHz Cortex-A76 + 6x 2.0 GHz Cortex-A55	Mali-G57 MC2 @950 MHz	4 GB; 6 GB (LPDDR4X)	64 GB; 128 GB (UFS 2.2)	50 MP, f/1.8 + 2 MP, f/2.4 (macro) + 2 MP, f/2.4 (depth)	8 MP, f/2.0	5000 mAh (Li-Po)	USB-C, 18 W	Android 12 (Realme UI 3.0)	Android 14 (Realme UI 5.0)
Realme 10	RMX3630	November 2022	Super AMOLED, 90 Hz Corning Gorilla Glass 5	6.43"	1080 x 2400 (~411 ppi)	No	MediaTek Helio G99 2x 2.2 GHz Cortex-A76 + 6x 2.0 GHz Cortex-A55	Mali-G57 MC2	4 GB; 6 GB 8 GB (LPDDR4X)	64 GB; 128 GB 256 GB (UFS 2.2)	50 MP, f/1.8 + 2 MP, f/2.4 (depth)	16 MP, f/2.5	5000 mAh (Li-Po)	USB-C, 33 W	Android 12 (Realme UI 3.0)	Android 14 (Realme UI 5.0)
Realme 10 5G	RMX3615	November 2022	IPS LCD, 60 Hz	6.58"	1080 x 2408 (~400 ppi)	Yes	MediaTek Dimensity 700 2x 2.2 GHz Cortex-A76 + 6x 2.0 GHz Cortex-A55	Mali-G57 MC2 @950 MHz	8 GB (LPDDR4X)	128 GB; 256 GB (UFS 2.2)	50 MP, f/1.8 + 2 MP, f/2.4 (macro) + 0.3 MP, f/2.8 (depth)	8 MP, f/2.05	5000 mAh (Li-Po)	USB-C, 33 W	Android 12 (Realme UI 3.0)	Android 14 (Realme UI 5.0)
Realme 10 Pro	RMX3660 RMX3661 RMX3663	November 2022	IPS LCD, 120 Hz	6.72"	1080 x 2400 (~400 ppi)	Yes	Qualcomm Snapdragon695 4x 2.2 GHz Cortex-A78 + 4x 1.7 GHz Cortex-A55	Adreno 619	6 GB 8 GB; 12 GB (LPDDR4X)	128 GB; 256 GB (UFS 2.2)	108 MP, f/1.75 + 2 MP, f/2.4 (depth)	16 MP, f/2.45	5000 mAh (Li-Po)	USB-C, 33 W	Android 13 (Realme UI 4.0)	Android 15 (Realme UI 6.0)
Realme 10 Pro+	RMX3686 RMX3687	November 2022	Tianma curved OLED, 120hz	6.7"	1080 x 2412 (~394 ppi)	Yes	MediaTek Dimensity 1080 2x 2.6 GHz Cortex-A78 + 6x 2.0 GHz Cortex-A55	Mali-G68 MC4	8 GB; 12 GB (LPDDR4X)	128 GB; 256 GB (UFS 2.2)	108 MP, f/1.75 + 8 MP, f/2.2 (ultrawide) + 2 MP, f/2.4 (macro)	16 MP, f/2.45	5000 mAh (Li-Po)	USB-C, 67 W	Android 13 (Realme UI 4.0)	Android 15 (Realme UI 6.0)
Realme 10s	RMX3617	December 2022	IPS LCD, 60 Hz	6.58"	1080 x 2408 (~400 ppi)	Yes	MediaTek Dimensity 810 2x 2.4 GHz Cortex-A76 + 6x 2.0 GHz Cortex-A55	Mali-G57 MC2 @950 MHz	8 GB (LPDDR4X)	128 GB; 256 GB (UFS 2.2)	50 MP, f/1.8 + 2 MP, f/2.4 (macro) + 0.3 MP, f/2.8 (depth)	8 MP, f/2.05	5000 mAh (Li-Po)	USB-C, 33 W	Android 12 (Realme UI 3.0)	Android 14 (Realme UI 5.0)
Realme 10T	RMX3612	March 2023	IPS LCD, 90 Hz	6.58"	1080 x 2408 (~400 ppi)	Yes	MediaTek Dimensity 810 2x 2.4 GHz Cortex-A76 + 6x 2.0 GHz Cortex-A55	Mali-G57 MC2 @950 MHz	4 GB; 8 GB (LPDDR4X)	128 GB; 256 GB (UFS 2.2)	50 MP, f/1.8 + 2 MP, f/2.4 (macro) + 0.3 MP, f/2.8 (depth)	8 MP, f/2.05	5000 mAh (Li-Po)	USB-C, 18 W	Android 12 (Realme UI 3.0)	Android 14 (Realme UI 5.0)
Realme 11 Pro Also: Narzo 60 Pro	RMX3770 RMX3771	May 2023	Tianma curved OLED, 120 Hz	6.7"	1080 x 2412 (~394 ppi)	Yes	MediaTek Dimensity 7050 2x 2.6 GHz Cortex-A78 + 6x 2.0 GHz Cortex-A55	Mali-G68 MC4	8 GB; 12 GB (LPDDR4X)	128 GB; 256 GB (UFS 3.1)	100 MP, f/1.75 OIS + 2 MP, f/2.4 (depth)	16 MP, f/2.45	5000 mAh (Li-Po)	USB-C, 67 W	Android 13 (Realme UI 4.0)	Android 15 (Realme UI 6.0)
Realme 11 Pro+	RMX3740 RMX3741	May 2023	Tianma curved OLED, 120 Hz	6.7"	1080 x 2412 (~394 ppi)	Yes	MediaTek Dimensity 7050 2x 2.6 GHz Cortex-A78 + 6x 2.0 GHz Cortex-A55	Mali-G68 MC4	12 GB (LPDDR4X)	256 GB 512 GB 1 TB (UFS 3.1)	200 MP, f/1.69 OIS + 8 MP, f/2.2 (ultrawide) + 2 MP, f/2.4 (macro)	32 MP, f/2.45	5000 mAh (Li-Po)	USB-C, 100 W	Android 13 (Realme UI 4.0)	Android 15 (Realme UI 6.0)
Realme 11 (China) India: Narzo 60	RMX3751	June 2023	Super AMOLED, 90 Hz Corning Gorilla Glass 5	6.43"	1080 x 2400 (~409 ppi)	Yes	MediaTek Dimensity 6020 2x 2.2 GHz Cortex-A76 + 6x 2.0 GHz Cortex-A55	Mali-G57 MC2 @950 MHz	8 GB; 12 GB (LPDDR4X)	256 GB (UFS 2.2)	64 MP, f/1.8 + 2 MP, f/2.4 (depth)	8 MP, f/2.05	5000 mAh (Li-Po)	USB-C, 33 W	Android 13 (Realme UI 4.0)	Android 15 (Realme UI 6.0)
Realme 11	RMX3636	July 2023	Super AMOLED, 90 Hz Corning Gorilla Glass 5	6.4"	1080 x 2400 (~411 ppi)	No	MediaTek Helio G99 2x 2.2 GHz Cortex-A76 + 6x 2.0 GHz Cortex-A55	Mali-G57 MC2	8 GB (LPDDR4X)	128 GB 256 GB (UFS 2.2)	108 MP, f/1.8 + 2 MP, f/2.4 (depth)	16 MP, f/2.5	5000 mAh (Li-Po)	USB-C, 67 W	Android 12 (Realme UI 3.0)	Android 14 (Realme UI 5.0)
Realme 11 5G	RMX3780	July 2023	IPS LCD, 120 Hz	6.72"	1080 x 2400 (~392 ppi)	Yes	MediaTek Dimensity 6100+ 2x 2.2 GHz Cortex-A76 + 6x 2.0 GHz Cortex-A55	Mali-G57 MC2	8 GB (LPDDR4X)	128 GB 256 GB (UFS 2.2)	108 MP, f/1.8 + 2 MP, f/2.4 (depth)	16 MP, f/2.5	5000 mAh (Li-Po)	USB-C, 67 W	Android 13 (Realme UI 4.0)	Android 15 (Realme UI 6.0)
Realme 11x	RMX3785	August 2023	IPS LCD, 120 Hz	6.72"	1080 x 2400 (~392 ppi)	Yes	MediaTek Dimensity 6100+ 2x 2.2 GHz Cortex-A76 + 6x 2.0 GHz Cortex-A55	Mali-G57 MC2	6 GB8; GB (LPDDR4X)	128 GB (UFS 2.2)	64 MP, f/1.8 + 2 MP, f/2.4 (depth)	8 MP, f/2.05	5000 mAh (Li-Po)	USB-C, 33 W	Android 13 (Realme UI 4.0)	Android 15 (Realme UI 6.0)
Realme 12 Pro+	RMX3840 RMX3841	January 2024	Curved AMOLED, 120 Hz	6.7"	1080 x 2412 (~394 ppi)		Qualcomm Snapdragon7s Gen 2 4x 2.4 GHz Cortex-A78 + 4x 1.95 GHz Cortex-A55	Adreno 710	8 GB 12 GB (LPDDR4X)	128 GB 256 GB 512 GB (UFS 2.2)	50 MP, f/1.8 OIS + 8 MP, f/2.2 (ultrawide) + 64 MP, f/2.8 OIS (periscope telephoto)	32 MP, f/2.4	5000 mAh (Li-Po)	USB-C, 67 W	Android 14 (Realme UI 5.0)	Android 15 (Realme UI 6.0)
Realme 12 Pro	RMX3842	January 2024	Curved AMOLED, 120 Hz	6.7"	1080 x 2412 (~394 ppi)		Qualcomm Snapdragon6 Gen 1 4x 2.2 GHz Cortex-A78 + 4x 1.8 GHz Cortex-A55	Adreno 710	8 GB 12 GB (LPDDR4X)	128 GB 256 GB 512 GB (UFS 2.2)	50 MP, f/1.8 OIS + 8 MP, f/2.2 (ultrawide) + 32 MP, f/2.0 OIS (telephoto)	16 MP, f/2.4	5000 mAh (Li-Po)	USB-C, 67 W	Android 14 (Realme UI 5.0)	Android 15 (Realme UI 6.0)
Realme 12+ Also: Narzo 70 Pro	RMX3867	March 2024	AMOLED, 120 Hz	6.67"	1080 x 2400 (~395 ppi)		MediaTek Dimensity 7050 2x 2.6 GHz Cortex-A78 + 6x 2.0 GHz Cortex-A55	Mali-G68 MC4	6 GB 8 GB 12 GB (LPDDR4X)	128 GB 256 GB 512 GB (UFS 2.2)	50 MP, f/1.9 OIS + 8 MP, f/2.2 (ultrawide) + 2 MP, f/2.4 (macro)	16 MP, f/2.5	5000 mAh (Li-Po)	USB-C, 67 W	Android 14 (Realme UI 5.0)	Android 15 (Realme UI 6.0)
Realme 12 5G	RMX3999	March 2024	IPS LCD, 120 Hz	6.72"	1080 x 2400 (~392 ppi)		MediaTek Dimensity 6100+ 2x 2.2 GHz Cortex-A76 + 6x 2.0 GHz Cortex-A55	Mali-G57 MC2	6 GB 8 GB (LPDDR4X)	128 GB 256 GB 512 GB (UFS 2.2)	108 MP, f/1.8 + 2 MP, f/2.4 (depth)	8 MP, f/2.0	5000 mAh (Li-Po)	USB-C, 45 W	Android 14 (Realme UI 5.0)	Android 15 (Realme UI 6.0)
Realme 12x (Global) India: C65 5G / Narzo N65	RMX3997	April 2024	IPS LCD, 120 Hz	6.67"	720 x 1604 (~264 ppi)		MediaTek Dimensity 6100+ 2x 2.2 GHz Cortex-A76 + 6x 2.0 GHz Cortex-A55	Mali-G57 MC2	6 GB 8 GB 12 GB (LPDDR4X)	128 GB 256 GB 512 GB (UFS 2.2)	50 MP, f/1.8 + 2 MP, f/2.4 (depth)	8 MP, f/2.0	5000 mAh (Li-Po)	USB-C, 15 W	Android 14 (Realme UI 5.0)	Android 15 (Realme UI 6.0)
Realme 12x (India)	RMX3998	April 2024	IPS LCD, 120 Hz	6.72"	1080 x 2400 (~392 ppi)		MediaTek Dimensity 6100+ 2x 2.2 GHz Cortex-A76 + 6x 2.0 GHz Cortex-A55	Mali-G57 MC2	4 GB 6 GB 8 GB (LPDDR4X)	128 GB 256 GB 512 GB (UFS 2.2)	50 MP, f/1.8 + 2 MP, f/2.4 (depth)	8 MP, f/2.0	5000 mAh (Li-Po)	USB-C, 45 W	Android 14 (Realme UI 5.0)	Android 15 (Realme UI 6.0)
Realme 12 Lite Also: C67		April 2024	IPS LCD, 90 Hz	6.72"	1080 x 2400 (~392 ppi)	No	Qualcomm Snapdragon 685 4x 2.8 GHz Cortex-A73 + 4x 1.9 GHz Cortex-A53	Adreno 610	6 GB 8 GB (LPDDR4X)	128 GB 256 GB (UFS 2.2)	108 MP, f/1.8 + 2 MP, f/2.4 (depth)	8 MP, f/2.1	5000 mAh (Li-Po)	USB-C, 33 W	Android 14 (Realme UI 5.0)	Android 15 (Realme UI 6.0)
Realme 12	RMX3871	July 2024	AMOLED, 120 Hz	6.67"	1080 x 2400 (~395 ppi)	No	Qualcomm Snapdragon 685 4x 2.8 GHz Cortex-A73 + 4x 1.9 GHz Cortex-A53	Adreno 610	8 GB; 12 GB (LPDDR4X)	128 GB 256 GB 512 GB (UFS 2.2)	50 MP, f/1.8 + 2 MP, f/2.4 (depth)	16 MP, f/2.5	5000 mAh (Li-Po)	USB-C, 67 W	Android 14 (Realme UI 5.0)	Android 15 (Realme UI 6.0)
Realme 13 Pro+	RMX3920 RMX3921	August 2024	Curved AMOLED, 120 Hz Corning Gorilla Glass 7i	6.7"	1080 x 2412 (~394 ppi)	Yes	Qualcomm Snapdragon7s Gen 2 4x 2.4 GHz Cortex-A78 + 4x 1.95 GHz Cortex-A55	Adreno 710	8 GB; 12 GB (LPDDR4X)	256 GB 512 GB (UFS 2.2)	50 MP, f/1.9 OIS + 8 MP, f/2.2 (ultrawide) + 50 MP, f/2.7 OIS (periscope telephoto)	32 MP, f/2.45	5200 mAh (Li-Po)	USB-C, 80 W	Android 14 (Realme UI 5.0)	Android 15 (Realme UI 6.0)
Realme 13 Pro Also: Realme 14 Pro Lite China: Realme 13 Pro Extreme	RMX3990	August 2024	Curved AMOLED, 120 Hz Corning Gorilla Glass 7i	6.7"	1080 x 2412 (~394 ppi)	Yes	Qualcomm Snapdragon7s Gen 2 4x 2.4 GHz Cortex-A78 + 4x 1.95 GHz Cortex-A55	Adreno 710	8 GB; 12 GB (LPDDR4X)	128 GB 256 GB 512 GB (UFS 2.2)	50 MP, f/1.9 OIS + 8 MP, f/2.2 (ultrawide)	32 MP, f/2.45	5200 mAh (Li-Po)	USB-C, 45 W	Android 14 (Realme UI 5.0)	Android 15 (Realme UI 6.0)
Realme 13		August 2024	AMOLED, 120 Hz	6.67"	1080 x 2400 (~395 ppi)	No	Qualcomm Snapdragon 685 4x 2.8 GHz Cortex-A73 + 4x 1.9 GHz Cortex-A53	Adreno 610	8 GB (LPDDR4X)	128 GB 256 GB (UFS 2.2)	50 MP, f/1.8 + 2 MP, f/2.4 (depth)	16 MP, f/2.5	5000 mAh (Li-Po)	USB-C, 67 W	Android 14 (Realme UI 5.0)	Android 15 (Realme UI 6.0)
Realme 13 Pro Extreme Global: Realme 13 Pro / 14 Pro Lite	RMX3989	September 2024	Curved AMOLED, 120 Hz Corning Gorilla Glass 7i	6.7"	1080 x 2412 (~394 ppi)	Yes	Qualcomm Snapdragon7s Gen 2 4x 2.4 GHz Cortex-A78 + 4x 1.95 GHz Cortex-A55	Adreno 710	12 GB (LPDDR4X)	256 GB 512 GB (UFS 2.2)	50 MP, f/1.9 OIS + 8 MP, f/2.2 (ultrawide)	32 MP, f/2.45	5200 mAh (Li-Po)	USB-C, 45 W	Android 14 (Realme UI 5.0)	Android 15 (Realme UI 6.0)
Realme 13 Pro (China) Global: Realme 13+ / 15 Lite	RMX5002	September 2024	AMOLED, 120 Hz	6.67"	1080 x 2400 (~395 ppi)	Yes	MediaTek Dimensity 7300 Energy 4x 2.5 GHz Cortex-A78 + 4x 2.0 GHz Cortex-A55	Mali-G615 MC2	8 GB; 12 GB (LPDDR4X)	256 GB (UFS 3.1)	50 MP, f/1.9 OIS + 2 MP, f/2.4 (depth) + flicker sensor	16 MP, f/2.4	5000 mAh (Li-Po)	USB-C, 80 W	Android 14 (Realme UI 5.0)	Android 15 (Realme UI 6.0)
Realme 13+ Also: Realme 15 Lite China: Realme 13 Pro	RMX5000	September 2024	AMOLED, 120 Hz	6.67"	1080 x 2400 (~395 ppi)	Yes	MediaTek Dimensity 7300 Energy 4x 2.5 GHz Cortex-A78 + 4x 2.0 GHz Cortex-A55	Mali-G615 MC2	8 GB; 12 GB (LPDDR4X)	128 GB 256 GB 512 GB (UFS 3.1)	50 MP, f/1.9 OIS + 2 MP, f/2.4 (depth) + flicker sensor	16 MP, f/2.4	5000 mAh (Li-Po)	USB-C, 80 W	Android 14 (Realme UI 5.0)	Android 15 (Realme UI 6.0)
Realme 13 5G	RMX3921 RMX3952	September 2024	IPS LCD, 120 Hz	6.72"	1080 x 2400 (~392 ppi)	Yes	MediaTek Dimensity 6300 2x 2.4 GHz Cortex-A76 + 6x 2.0 GHz Cortex-A55	Mali-G57 MC2	8 GB; 12 GB (LPDDR4X)	128 GB 256 GB (UFS 2.2)	50 MP, f/1.8 + 2 MP, f/2.4 (depth)	16 MP, f/2.5	5000 mAh (Li-Po)	USB-C, 45 W	Android 14 (Realme UI 5.0)	Android 15 (Realme UI 6.0)
Realme 14x (India)	RMX3940	December 2024	IPS LCD, 120 Hz	6.67"	720 x 1604 (~264 ppi)	Yes	MediaTek Dimensity 6300 2x 2.4 GHz Cortex-A76 + 6x 2.0 GHz Cortex-A55	Mali-G57 MC2	6 GB 8 GB (LPDDR4X)	128 GB (UFS 2.2)	50 MP, f/1.8 + Auxileary lens	8 MP	6000 mAh (Si/C Li-Ion)	USB-C, 45 W	Android 14 (Realme UI 5.0)	Android 15 (Realme UI 6.0)
Realme 14x (Global) China: V70 / V70x	RMX5020	January 2025	IPS LCD, 120 Hz	6.67"	720 x 1604 (~264 ppi)	Yes	MediaTek Dimensity 6300 2x 2.4 GHz Cortex-A76 + 6x 2.0 GHz Cortex-A55	Mali-G57 MC2	8 GB (LPDDR4X)	256 GB (UFS 2.2)	50 MP, f/1.8 + Auxileary lens	8 MP	5000 mAh (Li-Po)	USB-C, 15 W	Android 15 (Realme UI 6.0)	Android 15 (Realme UI 6.0)
Realme 14 Pro+		January 2025	OLED, 120 Hz Corning Gorilla Glass 7i	6.83"	1272 x 2800 (~450 ppi)	Yes	Qualcomm Snapdragon7s Gen 3 1x 2.5 GHz Cortex-A720 + 3x 2.4 GHz Cortex-A720 + 4x 1.8 GHz Cortex-A520	Adreno 810 @940 MHz	8 GB; 12 GB (LPDDR4X)	128 GB 256 GB 512 GB (UFS 2.2)	50 MP, f/1.8 OIS + 8 MP, f/2.2 (ultrawide) + 50 MP, f/2.7 OIS (periscope telephoto)	32 MP, f/2.0	6000 mAh (Si/C Li-Ion)	USB-C, 80 W	Android 15 (Realme UI 6.0)	Android 15 (Realme UI 6.0)
Realme 14 Pro		January 2025	Curved OLED, 120 Hz	6.77"	1080 x 2392 (~394 ppi)	Yes	MediaTek Dimensity 7300 Energy 4x 2.5 GHz Cortex-A78 + 4x 2.0 GHz Cortex-A55	Mali-G615 MC2	8 GB; 12 GB (LPDDR4X)	128 GB 256 GB 512 GB (UFS 2.2)	50 MP, f/1.8 OIS + 2 MP, f/2.4 (depth)	16 MP, f/2.4	6000 mAh (Si/C Li-Ion)	USB-C, 45 W	Android 15 (Realme UI 6.0)	Android 15 (Realme UI 6.0)
Realme 14 Pro Lite Also: Realme 13 Pro China: Realme 13 Pro Extreme	RMX3990	March 2025	Curved AMOLED, 120 Hz Corning Gorilla Glass 7i	6.7"	1080 x 2412 (~394 ppi)	Yes	Qualcomm Snapdragon7s Gen 2 4x 2.4 GHz Cortex-A78 + 4x 1.95 GHz Cortex-A55	Adreno 710	8 GB (LPDDR4X)	128 GB 256 GB (UFS 2.2)	50 MP, f/1.9 OIS + 8 MP, f/2.2 (ultrawide)	32 MP, f/2.45	5200 mAh (Li-Po)	USB-C, 45 W	Android 15 (Realme UI 6.0)	Android 15 (Realme UI 6.0)
Realme 14 Also: P3	RMX5075 (China)	March 2025	AMOLED, 120 Hz	6.67"	1080 x 2400 (~395 ppi)	Yes	Qualcomm Snapdragon6 Gen 4 1x 2.3 GHz Cortex-A720s + 3x 2.2 GHz Cortex-A720s + 4x 1.8 GHz Cortex-A520s	Adreno 810	16 GB (LPDDR4X)	256 GB 512 GB (UFS 2.2)	50 MP, f/1.8 + 2 MP, f/2.4 (depth)	16 MP, f/2.4	6000 mAh (Si/C Li-Ion)	USB-C, 45 W	Android 15 (Realme UI 6.0)	Android 15 (Realme UI 6.0)
Realme 14 Also: P3	RMX5070 (Global)	March 2025	AMOLED, 120 Hz	6.67"	1080 x 2400 (~395 ppi)	Yes	Qualcomm Snapdragon6 Gen 4 1x 2.3 GHz Cortex-A720s + 3x 2.2 GHz Cortex-A720s + 4x 1.8 GHz Cortex-A520s	Adreno 810	12 GB (LPDDR4X)	256 GB 512 GB (UFS 2.2)	50 MP, f/1.8 + 2 MP, f/2.4 (depth)	16 MP, f/2.4	6000 mAh (Si/C Li-Ion)	USB-C, 45 W	Android 15 (Realme UI 6.0)	Android 15 (Realme UI 6.0)
Realme 14T		April 2025	AMOLED, 120 Hz	6.67"	1080 x 2400 (~395 ppi)	Yes	MediaTek Dimensity 6300 2x 2.4 GHz Cortex-A76 + 6x 2.0 GHz Cortex-A55	Mali-G57 MC2	8 GB; 12 GB (LPDDR4X)	128 GB 256 GB (UFS 2.2)	50 MP, f/1.8 + 2 MP, f/2.4 (depth)	16 MP, f/2.4	6000 mAh (Si/C Li-Ion)	USB-C, 45 W	Android 15 (Realme UI 6.0)	Android 15 (Realme UI 6.0)
Realme 15 Pro	RMX5100 (China) RMX5101 (Global)	July 2025	Curved OLED, 144 Hz Corning Gorilla Glass 7i	6.8"	1280 x 2800 (~453 ppi)	Yes	Qualcomm Snapdragon7 Gen 4 1x 2.8 GHz Cortex-A720 + 4x 2.4 GHz Cortex-A720 + 3x 1.8 GHz Cortex-A520	Adreno 722	8 GB; 12 GB (LPDDR4X)	128 GB 256 GB 512 GB (UFS 3.1)	50 MP, f/1.8 OIS + 50 MP, f/2.0 (ultrawide) + Auxileary lens	50 MP, f/2.4	7000 mAh (Si/C Li-Ion)	USB-C, 80 W	Android 15 (Realme UI 6.0)	
Realme 15	RMX5105 (China) RMX5106 (Global)	July 2025	Curved OLED, 144 Hz	6.8"	1280 x 2800 (~453 ppi)	Yes	MediaTek Dimensity 7300+ 4x 2.6 GHz Cortex-A78 + 4x 2.0 GHz Cortex-A55	Mali-G615 MC2	8 GB; 12 GB (LPDDR4X)	128 GB 256 GB 512 GB (UFS 3.1)	50 MP, f/1.8 OIS + 8 MP, f/2.2 (ultrawide) + Auxileary lens	50 MP, f/2.4	7000 mAh (Si/C Li-Ion)	USB-C, 80 W	Android 15 (Realme UI 6.0)	
Realme 15T	RMX5111 (Global) RMX5112 (China)	September 2025	AMOLED, 120 Hz	6.57"	1080 x 2372 (~401 ppi)	Yes	MediaTek Dimensity 6400 Max 2x 2.5 GHz Cortex-A76 + 6x 2.0 GHz Cortex-A55	Mali-G57 MC2	8 GB; 12 GB (LPDDR4X)	128 GB 256 GB 512 GB (UFS 2.2)	50 MP, f/1.8 + 2 MP, f/2.4 (depth)	50 MP, f/2.4	7000 mAh (Si/C Li-Ion)	USB-C, 60 W	Android 15 (Realme UI 6.0)	
Realme 15 Lite Also: Realme 13+ China: Realme 13 Pro	RMX5000	October 2025	OLED, 120 Hz	6.67"	1080 x 2400 (~395 ppi)	Yes	MediaTek Dimensity 7300 Energy 4x 2.5 GHz Cortex-A78 + 4x 2.0 GHz Cortex-A55	Mali-G615 MC2	8 GB; 12 GB (LPDDR4X)	128 GB 256 GB (UFS 3.1)	50 MP, f/1.9 OIS + 2 MP, f/2.4 (depth) + flicker sensor	16 MP, f/2.4	5000 mAh (Li-Po)	USB-C, 80 W	Android 15 (Realme UI 6.0)	
Realme 15x	RMX5250	October 2025	IPS LCD, 144 Hz	6.81"	720 x 1570 (~254 ppi)	Yes	MediaTek Dimensity 6300 2x 2.4 GHz Cortex-A76 + 6x 2.0 GHz Cortex-A55	Mali-G57 MC2	6 GB; 8 GB (LPDDR4X)	128 GB 256 GB (UFS 2.2)	50 MP, f/1.8 + Auxileary lens	50 MP, f/2.4	7000 mAh (Si/C Li-Ion)	USB-C, 60 W	Android 15 (Realme UI 6.0)	
Model	Model number	Release date	Display type	Display size	Display resolution	5G support	SoC	GPU	RAM	Internal Storage	Rear	Front	Battery	Charging	Initial	Latest
Model	Model number	Release date	Display type	Display size	Display resolution	5G support	SoC	GPU	RAM	Internal Storage	Camera		Battery	Charging	Operating system	

=== GT Series ===
Model	Model number	Release date	Display type	Display size	Display resolution	5G support	SoC	GPU	RAM	Internal Storage	Camera		Battery	Charging	Operating system	
Model	Model number	Release date	Display type	Display size	Display resolution	5G support	SoC	GPU	RAM	Internal Storage	Rear	Front	Battery	Charging	Initial	Latest
GT	RMX2202	March 2021	Super AMOLED, 120 Hz	6.43"	1080 x 2400 (~409 ppi)	Yes	Qualcomm Snapdragon 888 1x 2.84 GHz Cortex-X1 + 3x 2.42 GHz Cortex-A78 + 4x 1.80 GHz Cortex-A55	Adreno 660 @840 MHz	8 GB; 12 GB (LPDDR5)	128 GB; 256 GB (UFS 3.1)	64 MP, f/1.8 + 8 MP, f/2.3 (ultrawide) + 2 MP, f/2.4 (macro)	16 MP, f/2.5	4500 mAh (Li-Po)	USB-C, 65 W	Android 11	Android 13
GT Neo	RMX3031	April 2021	Super AMOLED, 120 Hz	6.43"	1080 x 2400 (~409 ppi)	Yes	MediaTek Dimensity 1200 1x 3.0 GHz Cortex-A78 + 3x 2.6 GHz Cortex-A78 + 4x 2.0 GHz Cortex-A55	Mali-G77 MC9 @886 MHz	6 GB; 8 GB; 12 GB (LPDDR4X)	128 GB; 256 GB (UFS 3.1)	64 MP, f/1.8 + 8 MP, f/2.3 (ultrawide) + 2 MP, f/2.4 (macro)	16 MP, f/2.5	4500 mAh (Li-Po)	USB-C, 50 W	Android 11	Android 13
GT Neo Flash	RMX3350	June 2021	Super AMOLED, 120 Hz	6.43"	1080 x 2400 (~409 ppi)	Yes	MediaTek Dimensity 1200 1x 3.0 GHz Cortex-A78 + 3x 2.6 GHz Cortex-A78 + 4x 2.0 GHz Cortex-A55	Mali-G77 MC9 @886 MHz	8 GB; 12 GB (LPDDR4X)	256 GB (UFS 3.1)	64 MP, f/1.8 + 8 MP, f/2.3 (ultrawide) + 2 MP, f/2.4 (macro)	16 MP, f/2.5	4500 mAh (Li-Po)	USB-C, 65 W	Android 11	Android 13
GT Master	RMX3360 RMX3361; RMX3363	July 2021	Super AMOLED, 120 Hz	6.43"	1080 x 2400 (~409 ppi)	Yes	Qualcomm Snapdragon 778G 1x 2.4 GHz Cortex-A78 + 3x 2.2 GHz Cortex-A78 + 4x 1.9 GHz Cortex-A55	Adreno 642L @950 MH	6 GB 8 GB (LPDDR4X)	128 GB 256 GB (UFS 2.2)	64 MP, f/1.8 + 8 MP, f/2.2 (ultrawide) + 2 MP, f/2.4 (macro)	32 MP, f/2.5	4300 mAh (Li-Po)	USB-C, 65 W	Android 11	Android 13
GT Explorer Master	RMX3366	July 2021	Curved Super AMOLED, 120 Hz Corning Gorilla Glass 5	6.55"	1080 x 2400 (~402 ppi)	Yes	Qualcomm Snapdragon 870 1x 3.20 GHz + 3x 2.42 GHz + 4x 1.80 GHz	Adreno 650 @670 MHz	8 GB 12 GB (LPDDR4X)	128 GB; 256 GB (UFS 3.1)	50 MP OIS, f/1.88 + 16 MP, f/2.2 (ultrawide) + 2 MP, f/2.4 (macro)	32 MP, f/2.5	4500 mAh (Li-Po)	USB-C, 65 W	Android 11	Android 13
GT Neo2	RMX3370	September 2021	E4 Super AMOLED, 120 Hz	6.62"	1080 x 2400 (~398 ppi)	Yes	Qualcomm Snapdragon 870 1x 3.20 GHz + 3x 2.42 GHz + 4x 1.80 GHz	Adreno 650 @670 MHz	8 GB 12 GB (LPDDR4X)	128 GB; 256 GB (UFS 3.1)	64 MP, f/1.8 + 8 MP, f/2.3 (ultrawide) + 2 MP, f/2.4 (macro)	16 MP, f/2.5	5000 mAh (Li-Po)	USB-C, 65 W	Android 11	Android 13
GT Neo2T	RMX3357	November 2021	Super AMOLED, 120 Hz	6.43"	1080 x 2400 (~409 ppi)	Yes	MediaTek Dimensity 1200 AI 1x 3.0 GHz Cortex-A78 + 3x 2.6 GHz Cortex-A78 + 4x 2.0 GHz Cortex-A55	Mali-G77 MC9	8 GB 12 GB (LPDDR4X)	128 GB; 256 GB (UFS 3.1)	64 MP, f/1.79 + 8 MP, f/2.3 (ultrawide) + 2 MP, f/2.4 (macro)	16 MP, f/2.5	4500 mAh (Li-Po)	USB-C, 65 W	Android 11	Android 13
GT2	RMX3310; RMX3311; RMX3312	January 2022	E4 Super AMOLED, 120 Hz Corning Gorilla Glass 5	6.62"	1080 x 2400 (~398 ppi)	Yes	Qualcomm Snapdragon 888 1x 2.84 GHz Cortex-X1 + 3x 2.42 GHz Cortex-A78 + 4x 1.80 GHz Cortex-A55	Adreno 660 @840 MHz	8 GB; 12 GB (LPDDR5)	128 GB; 256 GB (UFS 3.1)	50 MP OIS, f/1.8 + 8 MP, f/2.2 (ultrawide) + 2 MP, f/2.4 (macro)	16 MP, f/2.5	5000 mAh (Li-Po)	USB-C, 65 W	Android 12	Android 13
GT2 Pro	RMX3300; RMX3301	January 2022	E4 LTPO 2.0 AMOLED, 120 Hz Corning Gorilla Glass Victus	6.7"	1440 x 3216 (~526 ppi)	Yes	Qualcomm Snapdragon 8 Gen 1 1x 3.0 GHz Cortex-X2 + 3x 2.5 GHz Cortex-A710 + 4x 1.8 GHz Cortex-A510	Adreno 730 @818 MHz	8 GB; 12 GB (LPDDR5)	128 GB; 256 GB; 512 GB (UFS 3.1)	50 MP OIS, f/1.8 + 50 MP, f/2.2 (ultrawide) +2 MP, f/3.3 (microscope)	32 MP, f/2.4	5000 mAh (Li-Po)	USB-C, 65 W	Android 12	Android 13
GT Neo3	RMX3560; RMX3561	March 2022	BOE/Tianma AMOLED, 120 Hz Corning Gorilla Glass 5	6.7"	1080 x 2412 (~394 ppi)	Yes	MediaTek Dimensity 8100 4x 2.85 GHz Cortex-A78 + 4x 2.0 GHz Cortex-A55	Mali-G610 MC6	6 GB; 8 GB; 12 GB (LPDDR5)	128 GB; 256 GB; 512 GB (UFS 3.1)	50 MP OIS, f/1.88 + 8 MP, f/2.3 (ultrawide) + 2 MP, f/2.4 (macro)	16 MP, f/2.5	5000 mAh (Li-Po)	USB-C, 80 W	Android 12	Android 13
GT Neo3 150 W	RMX3563	March 2022	BOE/Tianma AMOLED, 120 Hz Corning Gorilla Glass 5	6.7"	1080 x 2412 (~394 ppi)	Yes	MediaTek Dimensity 8100 4x 2.85 GHz Cortex-A78 + 4x 2.0 GHz Cortex-A55	Mali-G610 MC6	8 GB; 12 GB (LPDDR5)	256 GB 512 GB (UFS 3.1)	50 MP OIS, f/1.88 + 8 MP, f/2.3 (ultrawide) + 2 MP, f/2.4 (macro)	16 MP, f/2.5	4500 mAh (Li-Po)	USB-C, 150 W	Android 12	Android 13
GT Neo3T	RMX3371; RMX3372	June 2022	E4 Super AMOLED, 120 Hz Corning Gorilla Glass 5	6.62"	1080 x 2412 (~398 ppi)	Yes	Qualcomm Snapdragon 870 1x 3.20 GHz + 3x 2.42 GHz + 4x 1.80 GHz	Adreno 650 @670 MHz	6 GB 8 GB (LPDDR4X)	128 GB; 256 GB (UFS 3.1)	64 MP, f/1.8 + 8 MP, f/2.3 (ultrawide) + 2 MP, f/2.4 (macro)	16 MP, f/2.5	5000 mAh (Li-Po)	USB-C, 80 W	Android 12	Android 13
Realme GT2 Explorer Master	RMX3551	July 2022	BOE OLED, 120 Hz	6.7"	1080 x 2412 (~393 ppi)	Yes	Qualcomm Snapdragon 8+ Gen 1 1x 3.2 GHz Cortex-X2 + 3x 2.75 GHz Cortex-A710 + 4x 2.0 GHz Cortex-A510	Adreno 730 @900 MHz	8 GB; 12 GB (LPDDR5X)	128 GB 256 GB (UFS 3.1)	50 MP OIS, f/1.88 + 50 MP, f/2.2 (ultrawide) +2 MP, f/3.3 (microscope)	16 MP, f/2.5	5000 mAh (Li-Po)	USB-C, 100 W	Android 12	Android 13
GT Neo5		February 2023	Tianma T7+ OLED, 144 Hz	6.74"	1240 x 2772 (~451 ppi)	Yes	Qualcomm Snapdragon 8+ Gen 1 1x 3.0 GHz Cortex-X2 + 3x 2.5 GHz Cortex-A710 + 4x 1.8 GHz Cortex-A510	Adreno 730 @900 MHz	8 GB; 12 GB 16 GB (LPDDR5X)	256 GB 512 GB 1 TB (UFS 3.1)	50 MP OIS, f/1.88 + 8 MP, f/2.2 (ultrawide) +2 MP, f/3.3 (microscope)	16 MP, f/2.5	5000 mAh (Li-Po)	USB-C, 150 W	Android 13	Android 13
GT Neo5 240 W Global: GT3		February 2023	Tianma T7+ OLED, 144 Hz	6.74"	1240 x 2772 (~451 ppi)	Yes	Qualcomm Snapdragon 8+ Gen 1 1x 3.0 GHz Cortex-X2 + 3x 2.5 GHz Cortex-A710 + 4x 1.8 GHz Cortex-A510	Adreno 730 @900 MHz	16 GB (LPDDR5X)	256 GB 512 GB 1 TB (UFS 3.1)	50 MP OIS, f/1.88 + 8 MP, f/2.2 (ultrawide) +2 MP, f/3.3 (microscope)	16 MP, f/2.5	4600 mAh (Li-Po)	USB-C, 240 W	Android 13	Android 13
GT Neo5 SE		April 2023	Tianma T7+ OLED, 144 Hz	6.74"	1240 x 2772 (~451 ppi)	Yes	Qualcomm Snapdragon 7+ Gen 2 1x 2.91 GHz Cortex-X2 + 3x 2.5 GHz Cortex-A710 + 4x 1.8 GHz Cortex-A510	Adreno 725 @580 MHz	8 GB; 12 GB 16 GB (LPDDR5X)	256 GB 512 GB 1 TB (UFS 3.1)	64 MP, f/1.79 + 8 MP, f/2.2 (ultrawide) +2 MP, f/3.3 (microscope)	16 MP, f/2.5	5500 mAh (Li-Po)	USB-C, 100 W	Android 13	Android 13
GT 6T		May 2024	LTPO AMOLED	6.78”	1264 × 2780 pixels	Yes	Snapdragon 7+ Gen 3 (4nm)	Adreno 732	8 GB, 12 GB	128 GB, 256 GB, 512 GB	50 MP f/1.88 + 8 MP f/2.2	32 MP f/2.45	5,500 mAh	120 W SuperVOOC fast charging	Android 14	Realme UI 5.0
GT 7 Pro China: GT7 Pro		November 2024	LTPO AMOLED	6.78”		Yes	Snapdragon 8 Elite (3nm)	Adreno 830	12GB, 16GB	256GB, 512GB	50+8+2MP	16MP	5800 mAh	120 W	Android 15	Realme UI 6.0
Model	Model number	Release date	Display type	Display size	Display resolution	5G support	SoC	GPU	RAM	Internal Storage	Rear	Front	Battery	Charging	Initial	Latest
Model	Model number	Release date	Display type	Display size	Display resolution	5G support	SoC	GPU	RAM	Internal Storage	Camera		Battery	Charging	Operating system	

=== C Series ===
Model	Model number	Release date	Display type	Display size	Display resolution	5G support	SoC	GPU	RAM	Internal Storage	Camera		Battery	Charging	Operating system	
Model	Model number	Release date	Display type	Display size	Display resolution	5G support	SoC	GPU	RAM	Internal Storage	Rear	Front	Battery	Charging	Initial	Latest
C1	A1603	October 2018	IPS LCD Corning Gorilla Glass 3	6.2"	720 x 1520 (~271 ppi)	No	Qualcomm Snapdragon 450 8x 1.8 GHz Cortex-A53	Adreno 506 @600 MHz	2 GB (LPDDR3)	16 GB (eMMC 5.1)	13 MP, f/2.2 + 2 MP, f/2.4 (depth)	5 MP, f/2.2	4230 mAh (Li-Ion)		Android 8.1 (ColorOS 5.0)	Android 9 (ColorOS 6.0)
C1 (2019)	RMX1811	February 2019	IPS LCD Corning Gorilla Glass 3	6.2"	720 x 1520 (~271 ppi)	No	Qualcomm Snapdragon 450 8x 1.8 GHz Cortex-A53	Adreno 506 @600 MHz	2 GB; 3 GB (LPDDR3)	32 GB (eMMC 5.1)	13 MP, f/2.2 + 2 MP, f/2.4 (depth)	5 MP, f/2.2	4230 mAh (Li-Ion)		Android 8.1 (ColorOS 5.0)	Android 9 (ColorOS 6.0)
C2	RMX1941	May 2019	IPS LCD	6.1"	720 x 1560 (~282 ppi)	No	Mediatek Helio P22 8x 2.0 GHz Cortex-A53	PowerVR GE8320 @650 MHz	2 GB; 3 GB	16 GB; 32 GB; 64 GB (eMMC 5.1)	13 MP, f/2.2 + 2 MP, f/2.4 (depth)	5 MP, f/2.0	4000 mAh (Li-Po)		Android 9 (ColorOS 6 Lite)	
C2 (2020)		November 2019	IPS LCD	6.1"	720 x 1560 (~282 ppi)	No	Mediatek Helio P22 8x 2.0 GHz Cortex-A53	PowerVR GE8320 @650 MHz	2 GB; 3 GB	32 GB; 64 GB (eMMC 5.1)	13 MP, f/2.2 + 2 MP, f/2.4 (depth)	5 MP, f/2.0	4000 mAh (Li-Po)		Android 9 (ColorOS 6 Lite)	
C2s		January 2020	IPS LCD	6.1"	720 x 1560 (~282 ppi)	No	Mediatek Helio P22 8x 2.0 GHz Cortex-A53	PowerVR GE8320 @650 MHz	3 GB	32 GB (eMMC 5.1)	13 MP, f/2.2 + 2 MP, f/2.4 (depth)	5 MP, f/2.0	4000 mAh (Li-Po)		Android 9 (ColorOS 6.1)	
C3	RMX2027	February 2020	IPS LCD Corning Gorilla Glass 3	6.5"	720 x 1600 (~270 ppi)	No	MediaTek Helio G70 2x 2.0 GHz Cortex-A75 + 6x 1.7 GHz Cortex-A55	Mali-G52 MC2 @820 MHz	2 GB; 3 GB; 4 GB (LPDDR4X)	32 GB; 64 GB (eMMC 5.1)	12 MP, f/1.8 + 2 MP, f/2.4 (depth)	5 MP, f/2.4	5000 mAh (Li-Po)	microUSB, 10 W	Android 10 (Realme UI 1.0)	Android 11 (Realme UI 2.0)
C3	RMX2020; RMX2021	February 2020	IPS LCD Corning Gorilla Glass 3	6.5"	720 x 1600 (~270 ppi)	No	MediaTek Helio G70 2x 2.0 GHz Cortex-A75 + 6x 1.7 GHz Cortex-A55	Mali-G52 MC2 @820 MHz	2 GB; 3 GB; 4 GB (LPDDR4X)	32 GB; 64 GB (eMMC 5.1)	12 MP, f/1.8 + 2 MP, (macro) + 2 MP, f/2.4 (depth)	5 MP, f/2.4	5000 mAh (Li-Po)	microUSB, 10 W	Android 10 (Realme UI 1.0)	Android 11 (Realme UI 2.0)
C3i	RMX2020; RMX2027	July 2020	IPS LCD Corning Gorilla Glass 3	6.5"	720 x 1600 (~270 ppi)	No	MediaTek Helio G70 2x 2.0 GHz Cortex-A75 + 6x 1.7 GHz Cortex-A55	Mali-G52 MC2 @820 MHz	2 GB (LPDDR4X)	32 GB (eMMC 5.1)	12 MP, f/1.8 + 2 MP, f/2.4 (depth)	5 MP, f/2.4	5000 mAh (Li-Po)	microUSB, 10 W	Android 10 (Realme UI 1.0)	Android 11 (Realme UI 2.0)
C11	RMX2185	July 2020	IPS LCD	6.5"	720 x 1560 (~264 ppi)	No	MediaTek Helio G35 4x 2.3 GHz Cortex-A53 + 4x 1.8 GHz Cortex-A53	PowerVR GE8320 @680 MHz	2 GB; 3 GB	32 GB (eMMC 5.1)	13 MP, f/2.2 + 2 MP, f/2.4 (depth)	5 MP, f/2.4	5000 mAh (Li-Po)	microUSB, 10 W	Android 10 (Realme UI 1.0)	Android 10 (Realme UI 1.0)
C15	RMX2180	July 2020	IPS LCD Corning Gorilla Glass	6.5"	720 x 1600 (~270 ppi)	No	MediaTek Helio G35 4x 2.3 GHz Cortex-A53 + 4x 1.8 GHz Cortex-A53	PowerVR GE8320 @680 MHz	3 GB; 4 GB	32 GB; 64 GB; 128 GB (eMMC 5.1)	13 MP, f/2.2 + 8 MP, f/2.3 (ultrawide) + 2 MP, f/2.4 + 2 MP, f/2.4	8 MP, f/2.0	6000 mAh (Li-Po)	microUSB, 18 W	Android 10 (Realme UI 1.0)	Android 11 (Realme UI 2.0)
C12	RMX2189	August 2020	IPS LCD Corning Gorilla Glass	6.5"	720 x 1560 (~264 ppi)	No	MediaTek Helio G35 4x 2.3 GHz Cortex-A53 + 4x 1.8 GHz Cortex-A53	PowerVR GE8320 @680 MHz	3 GB; 4 GB	32 GB; 64 GB (eMMC 5.1)	13 MP, f/2.2 + 2 MP, f/2.4 + 2 MP, f/2.4	5 MP, f/2.0	6000 mAh (Li-Po)	microUSB, 10 W	Android 10 (Realme UI 1.0)	Android 11 (Realme UI 2.0)
C17	RMX2101	September 2020	IPS LCD Corning Gorilla Glass	6.5"	720 x 1600 (~270 ppi)	No	Qualcomm Snapdragon 460 4x 1.8 GHz Cortex-A73 + 4x 1.8 GHz Cortex-A53	Adreno 610 @600 MHz		64 GB; 128 GB; 256 GB (UFS 2.2)	13 MP, f/2.2 + 8 MP, f/2.3 (ultrawide) + 2 MP, f/2.4 (macro) + 2 MP, f/2.4 (depth)	8 MP, f/2.0	5000 mAh (Li-Po)	USB-C, 18 W	Android 10 (Realme UI 1.0)	Android 11 (Realme UI 2.0)
C15 Qualcomm Edititon	RMX2195	October 2020	IPS LCD Corning Gorilla Glass	6.5"	720 x 1600 (~270 ppi)	No	Qualcomm Snapdragon 460 4x 1.8 GHz Cortex-A73 + 4x 1.8 GHz Cortex-A53	Adreno 610 @600 MHz	3 GB; 4 GB	32 GB; 64 GB; 128 GB (eMMC 5.1)	13 MP, f/2.2 + 8 MP, f/2.3 (ultrawide) + 2 MP, f/2.4 + 2 MP, f/2.4	8 MP, f/2.0	6000 mAh (Li-Po)	microUSB, 18 W	Android 10 (Realme UI 1.0)	Android 11 (Realme UI 2.0)
C11 (2021) Also: narzo 50i	RMX3231	June 2021	IPS LCD	6.52"	720 x 1600 (~269 ppi)	No	UNISOC SC9863A 4x 1.6 GHz Cortex-A55 + 4x 1.2 GHz Cortex-A55	PowerVR GE8322 @550 MHz	2 GB; 4 GB	32 GB; 64 GB (eMMC 5.1)	8 MP, f/2.0	5 MP, f/2.2	5000 mAh (Li-Po)	microUSB, 10 W	Android 11 (Realme UI Go Edition)	
C20 Bangladesh: C20A	RMX3061; RMX3063	January 2021	IPS LCD Corning Gorilla Glass 3	6.5"	720 x 1600 (~270 ppi)	No	MediaTek Helio G35 4x 2.3 GHz Cortex-A53 + 4x 1.8 GHz Cortex-A53	PowerVR GE8320 @680 MHz	2 GB	32 GB (eMMC 5.1)	8 MP, f/2.0	5 MP, f/2.2	5000 mAh (Li-Po)	microUSB, 10 W	Android 10 (Realme UI 1.0)	Android 11 (Realme UI 2.0)
C21	RMX3201	March 2021	IPS LCD	6.5"	720 x 1600 (~270 ppi)	No	MediaTek Helio G35 4x 2.3 GHz Cortex-A53 + 4x 1.8 GHz Cortex-A53	PowerVR GE8320 @680 MHz	2 GB; 3 GB	32 GB; 64 GB (eMMC 5.1)	13 MP, f/2.2 + 2 MP, f/2.4 (macro) + 2 MP, f/2.4 (depth)	5 MP, f/2.2	5000 mAh (Li-Po)	microUSB, 10 W	Android 10 (Realme UI 1.0)	Android 11 (Realme UI 2.0)
C25	RMX3191	March 2021	IPS LCD	6.5"	720 x 1600 (~270 ppi)	No	MediaTek Helio G70 2x 2.0 GHz Cortex-A75 + 6x 1.7 GHz Cortex-A55	Mali-G52 MC2 @820 MHz	4 GB (LPDDR4X)	32 GB; 64 GB (eMMC 5.1)	48 MP, f/1.8 + 2 MP, f/2.4 (macro) + 2 MP, f/2.4 (depth)	8 MP, f/2.0	6000 mAh (Li-Po)	USB-C, 18 W	Android 11 (Realme UI 2.0)	Android 13 (Realme UI 4.0)
C25	RMX3193 (India)	March 2021	IPS LCD	6.5"	720 x 1600 (~270 ppi)	No	MediaTek Helio G70 2x 2.0 GHz Cortex-A75 + 6x 1.7 GHz Cortex-A55	Mali-G52 MC2 @820 MHz	4 GB (LPDDR4X)	32 GB; 64 GB (eMMC 5.1)	13 MP, f/2.2 + 2 MP, f/2.4 (macro) + 2 MP, f/2.4 (depth)	8 MP, f/2.0	6000 mAh (Li-Po)	USB-C, 18 W	Android 11 (Realme UI 2.0)	Android 13 (Realme UI 4.0)
C25s	RMX3195	June 2021	IPS LCD	6.5"	720 x 1600 (~270 ppi)	No	MediaTek Helio G85 2x 2.0 GHz Cortex-A75 + 6x 1.8 GHz Cortex-A55	Mali-G52 MC2 @1 GHz	4 GB (LPDDR4X)	64 GB; 128 GB (eMMC 5.1)	48 MP, f/1.8 + 2 MP, f/2.4 (macro) + 2 MP, f/2.4 (depth)	8 MP, f/2.0	6000 mAh (Li-Po)	USB-C, 18 W	Android 11 (Realme UI 2.0)	Android 13 (Realme UI 4.0)
C25s	RMX3197 (India)	June 2021	IPS LCD	6.5"	720 x 1600 (~270 ppi)	No	MediaTek Helio G85 2x 2.0 GHz Cortex-A75 + 6x 1.8 GHz Cortex-A55	Mali-G52 MC2 @1 GHz	4 GB (LPDDR4X)	64 GB; 128 GB (eMMC 5.1)	13 MP, f/2.2 + 2 MP, f/2.4 (macro) + 2 MP, f/2.4 (depth)	8 MP, f/2.0	6000 mAh (Li-Po)	USB-C, 18 W	Android 11 (Realme UI 2.0)	Android 13 (Realme UI 4.0)
C21Y	RMX3261; RMX3263	July 2021	IPS LCD	6.5"	720 x 1600 (~270 ppi)	No	UNISOC T610 2x 1.8 GHz Cortex-A75 + 6x 1.8 GHz Cortex-A55	Mali-G52 MC2 @614 MHz	3 GB; 4 GB (LPDDR4X)	32 GB; 64 GB (eMMC 5.1)	13 MP, f/2.2 + 2 MP, f/2.4 (macro) + 2 MP, f/2.4 (depth)	5 MP, f/2.2	5000 mAh (Li-Po)	microUSB, 10 W	Android 11 (Realme UI R Edition)	
C25Y	RMX3265; RMX3268; RMX3269	September 2021	IPS LCD		720 x 1600 (~270 ppi)	No	UNISOC Tiger T610 2x 1.8 GHz Cortex-A75 + 6x 1.8 GHz Cortex-A55	Mali-G52 MC2 @614 MHz	4 GB; 6 GB	64 GB; 128 GB (eMMC 5.1)	50 MP, f/1.8 + 2 MP, f/2.4 (macro) + 2 MP, f/2.4 (depth)	8 MP, f/2.0	5000 mAh (Li-Po)	microUSB, 18 W	Android 11 (Realme UI R Edition)	
C35	RMX3511	January 2022	IPS LCD Panda Glass	6.6"	1080 x 2408 (~401 ppi)	No	UNISOC Tiger T616 2x 2.0 GHz Cortex-A75 + 6x 1.8 GHz Cortex-A55	Mali-G57 MC1 @750 MHz	4 GB; 6 GB (LPDDR4X)	64 GB; 128 GB (UFS 2.2)	50 MP, f/1.8 + 2 MP, f/2.4 (macro) + 0.3 MP, f/2.8 (depth)	8 MP, f/2.0	5000 mAh (Li-Po)	USB-C, 18 W	Android 11 (Realme UI 2.0)	Android 13 (Realme UI 4.0)
C31	RMX3501	March 2022	IPS LCD Panda Glass	6.5"	720 x 1600 (~270 ppi)	No	UNISOC Tiger T612 2x 1.8 GHz Cortex-A75 + 6x 1.8 GHz Cortex-A55	Mali-G57 MC1	3 GB; 4 GB	32 GB; 64 GB (UFS 2.2)	13 MP, f/2.2 + 2 MP, f/2.4 (macro) + 0.3 MP, f/2.8 (depth)	5 MP, f/2.2	5000 mAh (Li-Po)	microUSB, 10 W	Android 11 (Realme UI R Edition)	Android 13 (Realme UI T Edition)
C30 Also: narzo 50i Prime	RMX3581	June 2022	IPS LCD	6.5"	720 x 1600 (~270 ppi)	No	UNISOC Tiger T612 2x 1.8 GHz Cortex-A75 + 6x 1.8 GHz Cortex-A55	Mali-G57 MC1	2 GB; 3 GB; 4 GB	32 GB; 64 GB (UFS 2.2)	8 MP, f/2.0	5 MP, f/2.2	5000 mAh (Li-Po)	microUSB, 10 W	Android 11 (Realme UI Go Edition)	
C33	RMX3624	September 2022	IPS LCD	6.5"	720 x 1600 (~270 ppi)	No	UNISOC Tiger T612 2x 1.8 GHz Cortex-A75 + 6x 1.8 GHz Cortex-A55	Mali-G57 MC1	3 GB; 4 GB (LPDDR4X)	32 GB; 64 GB; 128 GB (UFS 2.2)	50 MP + 0.3 MP, f/2.8 (depth)	5 MP, f/2.2	5000 mAh (Li-Po)	microUSB, 10 W	Android 12 (Realme UI S Edition)	Android 13 (Realme UI T Edition)
C30s	RMX3690	September 2022	IPS LCD	6.5"	720 x 1600 (~270 ppi)	No	UNISOC SC9863A 4x 1.6 GHz Cortex-A55 + 4x 1.2 GHz Cortex-A55	PowerVR GE8322 @550 MHz	2 GB; 3 GB; 4 GB	32 GB; 64 GB (eMMC 5.1)	8 MP, f/2.0	5 MP, f/2.2	5000 mAh (Li-Po)	microUSB, 10 W	Android 12 (Realme UI Go Edition)	
C33 (2023)	RMX3627	March 2023	IPS LCD	6.5"	720 x 1600 (~270 ppi)	No	UNISOC Tiger T612 2x 1.8 GHz Cortex-A75 + 6x 1.8 GHz Cortex-A55	Mali-G57 MC1	4 GB (LPDDR4X)	64 GB; 128 GB (UFS 2.2)	50 MP + 0.3 MP, f/2.8 (depth)	5 MP, f/2.2	5000 mAh (Li-Po)	microUSB, 10 W	Android 12 (Realme UI S Edition)	Android 13 (Realme UI T Edition)
C55 Also: Narzo N55	RMX3710	March 2023	IPS LCD, 90 Hz	6.72"	1080 x 2400 (~392 ppi)	No	MediaTek Helio G88 2x 2.0 GHz Cortex-A75 + 6x 1.8 GHz Cortex-A55	Mali-G52 MC2 @1 GHz	4 GB; 6 GB 8 GB(LPDDR4X)	64 GB; 128 GB; 256 GB (eMMC 5.1)	64 MP, f/1.8 + 2 MP, f/2.4 (depth)	8 MP, f/2.0	5000 mAh (Li-Po)	USB-C, 33 W	Android 13 (Realme UI 4.0)	Android 15 (Realme UI 6.0)
C51s	RMX3765	March 2023	IPS LCD, 90 Hz	6.74"	720 x 1600 (~260 ppi)	No	UNISOC Tiger T612 2x 1.8 GHz Cortex-A75 + 6x 1.8 GHz Cortex-A55	Mali-G57 MC1	6 GB (LPDDR4X)	128 GB (eMMC 5.1)	50 MP, f/1.8 + 0.08 MP, f/3.0 (auxiliary lens)	5 MP, f/2.2	5000 mAh (Li-Po)	USB-C, 33 W	Android 13 (Realme UI T Edition)	Android 14 (Realme UI 5.0)
C53	RMX3760	May 2023	IPS LCD, 90 Hz	6.74"	720 x 1600 (~260 ppi)	No	UNISOC Tiger T612 2x 1.8 GHz Cortex-A75 + 6x 1.8 GHz Cortex-A55	Mali-G57 MC1	6 GB 8 GB(LPDDR4X)	128 GB; 256 GB (eMMC 5.1)	50 MP, f/1.8 + 0.3 MP (depth)	8 MP, f/2.0	5000 mAh (Li-Po)	USB-C, 33 W	Android 13 (Realme UI T Edition)	Android 14 (Realme UI 5.0)
C53	RMX3762 (India)	July 2023	IPS LCD, 90 Hz	6.74"	720 x 1600 (~260 ppi)	No	UNISOC Tiger T612 2x 1.8 GHz Cortex-A75 + 6x 1.8 GHz Cortex-A55	Mali-G57 MC1	4 GB; 6 GB (LPDDR4X)	128 GB; 256 GB (eMMC 5.1)	108 MP + 0.3 MP (depth)	8 MP, f/2.0	5000 mAh (Li-Po)	USB-C, 18 W	Android 13 (Realme UI T Edition)	Android 14 (Realme UI 5.0)
C51	RMX3830	July 2023	IPS LCD, 90 Hz	6.74"	720 x 1600 (~260 ppi)	No	UNISOC Tiger T612 2x 1.8 GHz Cortex-A75 + 6x 1.8 GHz Cortex-A55	Mali-G57 MC1	3 GB; 4 GB 6 GB(LPDDR4X)	64 GB; 128 GB; 256 GB (eMMC 5.1)	50 MP, f/1.8 + 0.08 MP, f/3.0 (auxiliary lens)	5 MP, f/2.2	5000 mAh (Li-Po)	USB-C, 33 W	Android 13 (Realme UI T Edition)	Android 14 (Realme UI 5.0)
C67 5G Also: Narzo 60x	RMX3782	December 2023	IPS LCD, 120 Hz	6.72"	1080 x 2400 (~392 ppi)	Yes	MediaTek Dimensity 6100+ 2x 2.2 GHz Cortex-A76 + 6x 2.0 GHz Cortex-A55	Mali-G57 MC2	4 GB 6 GB(LPDDR4X)	128 GB (UFS 2.2)	50 MP, f/1.8 + 2 MP, f/2.4 (depth)	8 MP, f/2.1	5000 mAh (Li-Po)	USB-C, 33 W	Android 13 (Realme UI 4.0)	Android 15 (Realme UI 6.0)
C67 Also: Realme 12 Lite	RMX3890	December 2023	IPS LCD, 90 Hz	6.72"	1080 x 2400 (~392 ppi)	No	Qualcomm Snapdragon 685 4x 2.8 GHz Cortex-A73 + 4x 1.9 GHz Cortex-A53	Adreno 610	6 GB; 8 GB (LPDDR4X)	128 GB; 256 GB (UFS 2.2)	108 MP, f/1.8 + 2 MP, f/2.4 (depth)	8 MP, f/2.0	5000 mAh (Li-Po)	USB-C, 33 W	Android 14 (Realme UI 5.0)	Android 15 (Realme UI 6.0)
C65	RMX3910	April 2024	IPS LCD, 90 Hz	6.67"	720 x 1600 (~264 ppi)	No	MediaTek Helio G85 2x 2.0 GHz Cortex-A75 + 6x 1.8 GHz Cortex-A55	Mali-G52 MC2 @1 GHz	6 GB; 8 GB (LPDDR4X)	128 GB; 256 GB (eMMC 5.1)	50 MP, f/1.8 + 2 MP, f/2.4 (depth)	8 MP, f/2.0	5000 mAh (Li-Po)	USB-C, 45 W	Android 14 (Realme UI 5.0)	Android 15 (Realme UI 6.0)
C65 5G Also: Narzo N65 Global: Realme 12x	RMX3997	April 2024	IPS LCD, 120 Hz	6.67"	720 x 1604 (~264 ppi)	Yes	MediaTek Dimensity 6300 2x 2.4 GHz Cortex-A76 + 6x 2.0 GHz Cortex-A55	Mali-G57 MC2	4 GB; 6 GB 8 GB(LPDDR4X)	64 GB; 128 GB (UFS 2.2)	50 MP, f/1.8 + 2 MP, f/2.4 (depth)	8 MP, f/2.0	5000 mAh (Li-Po)	USB-C, 15 W	Android 14 (Realme UI 5.0)	Android 15 (Realme UI 6.0)
C63 Vietnam: C65s	RMX3939	June 2024	IPS LCD, 90 Hz	6.75"	720 x 1600 (~260 ppi)	No	UNISOC Tiger T612 2x 1.8 GHz Cortex-A75 + 6x 1.8 GHz Cortex-A55	Mali-G57 MC1	4 GB; 6 GB 8 GB(LPDDR4X)	64 GB; 128 GB; 256 GB (eMMC 5.1)	50 MP, f/1.8 + Auxileary lens	8 MP, f/2.0	5000 mAh (Li-Po)	USB-C, 45 W	Android 14 (Realme UI 5.0)	Android 14 (Realme UI 5.0)
C61 (India) Also: Narzo N61 Global: Note 60	RMX3933	July 2024	IPS LCD, 90 Hz	6.78"	720 x 1600 (~259 ppi)	No	UNISOC Tiger T612 2x 1.8 GHz Cortex-A75 + 6x 1.8 GHz Cortex-A55	Mali-G57 MC1	4 GB; 6 GB (LPDDR4X)	64 GB; 128 GBB (eMMC 5.1)	32 MP, f/1.8 + Auxileary lens	5 MP, f/2.2	5000 mAh (Li-Po)	USB-C, 10 W	Android 14 (Realme UI 5.0)	Android 14 (Realme UI 5.0)
C61	RMX3930 RMX3939	July 2024	IPS LCD, 90 Hz	6.74"	720 x 1600 (~260 ppi)	No	UNISOC Tiger T612 2x 1.8 GHz Cortex-A75 + 6x 1.8 GHz Cortex-A55	Mali-G57 MC1	4 GB; 6 GB 8 GB (LPDDR4X)	64 GB; 128 GB; 256 GB (eMMC 5.1)	50 MP, f/1.8 + 0.08 MP, f/3.0 (auxiliary lens)	5 MP, f/2.2	5000 mAh (Li-Po)	USB-C, 15 W	Android 14 (Realme UI 5.0)	Android 14 (Realme UI 5.0)
C63 5G China: V60 / V60s	RMX3950	August 2024	IPS LCD, 120 Hz	6.67"	720 x 1604 (~264 ppi)	Yes	MediaTek Dimensity 6300 2x 2.4 GHz Cortex-A76 + 6x 2.0 GHz Cortex-A55	Mali-G57 MC2	4 GB; 6 GB 8 GB (LPDDR4X)	128 GB (UFS 2.2)	32 MP, f/1.9 + Auxileary lens	8 MP, f/2.0	5000 mAh (Li-Po)	USB-C, 15 W	Android 14 (Realme UI 5.0)	Android 15 (Realme UI 6.0)
C75	RMX3941	November 2024	IPS LCD, 90 Hz ArmorShell	6.72"	1080 x 2400 (~392 ppi)	No	MediaTek Helio G92 Max 2x 2.0 GHz Cortex-A75 + 6x 1.8 GHz Cortex-A55	Mali-G57 MC2	6 GB 8 GB (LPDDR4X)	128 GB; 256 GB (eMMC 5.1)	50 MP, f/1.8 + Auxileary lens	8 MP, f/2.0	6000 mAh (Si/C Li-Ion)	USB-C, 45 W	Android 14 (Realme UI 5.0)	Android 15 (Realme UI 6.0)
C75x	RMX5020	March 2025	IPS LCD, 120 Hz ArmorShell	6.67"	720 x 1604 (~264 ppi)	No	MediaTek Helio G81 Ultra 2x 2.0 GHz Cortex-A75 + 6x 1.8 GHz Cortex-A55	Mali-G57 MC2	8 GB (LPDDR4X)	128 GB (eMMC 5.1)	50 MP, f/1.8 + Auxileary lens	5 MP, f/2.2	5600 mAh (Si/C Li-Ion)	USB-C, 45 W	Android 15 (Realme UI 6.0)	Android 15 (Realme UI 6.0)
C75 5G	RMX3943	May 2025	IPS LCD, 120 Hz	6.67"	720 x 1604 (~264 ppi)	Yes	MediaTek Dimensity 6300 2x 2.4 GHz Cortex-A76 + 6x 2.0 GHz Cortex-A55	Mali-G57 MC2	4 GB; 6 GB (LPDDR4X)	64 GB; 128 GB (UFS 2.2)	32 MP, f/1.8 + Auxileary lens	8 MP, f/2.0	6000 mAh (Si/C Li-Ion)	USB-C, 45 W	Android 15 (Realme UI 6.0)	Android 15 (Realme UI 6.0)
C73	RMX3945	June 2025	IPS LCD, 120 Hz	6.67"	720 x 1604 (~264 ppi)	Yes	MediaTek Dimensity 6300 2x 2.4 GHz Cortex-A76 + 6x 2.0 GHz Cortex-A55	Mali-G57 MC2	4 GB (LPDDR4X)	64 GB; 128 GB (UFS 2.2)	32 MP, f/1.8 + Auxileary lens	8 MP, f/2.0	6000 mAh (Si/C Li-Ion)	USB-C, 15 W	Android 15 (Realme UI 6.0)	Android 15 (Realme UI 6.0)
C71	RMX5303	June 2025	IPS LCD, 120 Hz	6.67"	720 x 1604 (~264 ppi)	No	UNISOC Tiger T7250 2x 1.8 GHz Cortex-A75 + 6x 1.6 GHz Cortex-A55	Mali-G57 MC1	4 GB; 6 GB 8 GB (LPDDR4X)	64 GB; 128 GB; 256 GB (eMMC 5.1)	50 MP, f/1.8 + Auxileary lens	5 MP, f/2.2	6000 mAh (Europe) 6300 mAh (Asia) (Si/C Li-Ion)	USB-C, 45 W	Android 15 (Realme UI 6.0)	Android 15 (Realme UI 6.0)
C71 (India) Global: Note 70	RMX5313	July 2025	IPS LCD, 90 Hz	6.74"	720 x 1600 (~264 ppi)	No	UNISOC Tiger T7250 2x 1.8 GHz Cortex-A75 + 6x 1.6 GHz Cortex-A55	Mali-G57 MC1	4 GB; 6 GB (LPDDR4X)	64 GB; 128 GB (eMMC 5.1)	13 MP, f/2.2 + Auxileary lens	5 MP, f/2.2	6300 mAh (Si/C Li-Ion)	USB-C, 15 W	Android 15 (Realme UI 6.0)	Android 15 (Realme UI 6.0)
C85 Pro	RMX5250	November 2025	AMOLED, 120 Hz	6.8"	1080 x 2344 (~392 ppi)	No	Qualcomm Snapdragon 685 4x 2.8 GHz Cortex-A73 + 4x 1.9 GHz Cortex-A53	Adreno 610	6 GB 8 GB (LPDDR4X)	128 GB; 256 GB (UFS 2.2)	50 MP, f/1.8 + Auxileary lens	8 MP, f/2.0	7000 mAh (Si/C Li-Ion)	USB-C, 45 W	Android 15 (Realme UI 6.0)	
C85	RMX5253	November 2025	IPS LCD, 144 Hz	6.8"	720 x 1570 (~254 ppi)	Yes	MediaTek Dimensity 6300 2x 2.4 GHz Cortex-A76 + 6x 2.0 GHz Cortex-A55	Mali-G57 MC2	8 GB (LPDDR4X)	256 GB (UFS 2.2)	50 MP, f/1.8 + Auxileary lens	8 MP, f/2.0	7000 mAh (Si/C Li-Ion)	USB-C, 45 W	Android 15 (Realme UI 6.0)	
Model	Model number	Release date	Display type	Display size	Display resolution	5G support	SoC	GPU	RAM	Internal Storage	Rear	Front	Battery	Charging	Initial	Latest
Model	Model number	Release date	Display type	Display size	Display resolution	5G support	SoC	GPU	RAM	Internal Storage	Camera		Battery	Charging	Operating system	

=== Narzo Series ===
Model	Model number	Release date	Display type	Display size	Display resolution	5G support	SoC	GPU	RAM	Internal Storage	Camera		Battery	Charging	Operating system	
Model	Model number	Release date	Display type	Display size	Display resolution	5G support	SoC	GPU	RAM	Internal Storage	Rear	Front	Battery	Charging	Initial	Latest
Narzo 10 Global: Realme 6i	RMX2040	May 2020	IPS LCD Corning Gorilla Glass 3	6.5"	720 x 1600 (~270 ppi)	No	MediaTek Helio G80 2x 2.0 GHz Cortex-A75 + 6x 1.8 GHz Cortex-A55	Mali-G52 MC2 @950 MHz	4 GB (LPDDR4X)	128 GB (eMMC 5.1)	48 MP, f/1.8 + 8 MP, f/2.3 (ultrawide) + 2 MP, f/2.4 (macro) + 2 MP, f/2.4	16 MP, f/2.0	5000 mAh (Li-Po)	USB-C, 18 W	Android 10 (Realme UI 1.0)	Android 12 (Realme UI 3.0)
Narzo 10A Global: Realme C3	RMX2020	May 2020	IPS LCD Corning Gorilla Glass 3	6.5"	720 x 1600 (~270 ppi)	No	MediaTek Helio G70 2x 2.0 GHz Cortex-A75 + 6x 1.7 GHz Cortex-A55	Mali-G52 MC2 @820 MHz	3 GB; 4 GB (LPDDR4X)	32 GB; 64 GB (eMMC 5.1)	12 MP, f/1.8 + 2 MP, f/2.4 (macro) + 2 MP, f/1.8 (depth)	5 MP, f/2.4	5000 mAh (Li-Po)	microUSB, 10 W	Android 10 (Realme UI 1.0)	Android 11 (Realme UI 2.0)
Narzo Global: Realme 6s India: Realme 6i	RMX2002	June 2020	IPS LCD Corning Gorilla Glass 3	6.5"	1080 x 2400 (~405 ppi)	No	MediaTek Helio G90T 2x 2.05 GHz Cortex-A76 + 6x 2.0 GHz Cortex-A55	Mali-G76 MC4 @800 MHz	4 GB (LPDDR4X)	128 GB (UFS 2.1)	48 MP, f/1.8 + 8 MP, f/2.3 (ultrawide) + 2 MP, f/2.4 (macro) + 2 MP, f/2.4 (depth)	16 MP, f/2.0	4300 mAh (Li-Po)	USB-C, 30 W	Android 10 (Realme UI 1.0)	Android 12 (Realme UI 3.0)
narzo 20A	RMX2050	September 2020	IPS LCD Corning Gorilla Glass 3	6.5"	720 x 1600 (~270 ppi)	No	Qualcomm Snapdragon 665 4x 2.0 GHz Cortex-A73 + 4x 1.8 GHz Cortex-A53	Adreno 610 @950 MHz	3 GB; 4 GB	32 GB; 64 GB (eMMC 5.1)	12 MP, f/1.8 + 2 MP, f/2.4 (depth) + 2 MP, f/2.4 (depth)	8 MP, f/2.0	5000 mAh (Li-Po)	microUSB, 10 W	Android 10 (Realme UI 1.0)	Android 11 (Realme UI 2.0)
narzo 20 Global: Realme 7i	RMX2193	September 2020	IPS LCD	6.5"	720 x 1600 (~270 ppi)	No	MediaTek Helio G85 2x 2.0 GHz Cortex-A75 + 6x 1.8 GHz Cortex-A55	Mali-G52 MC2 @1 GHz	4 GB (LPDDR4X)	64 GB; 128 GB (eMMC 5.1)	48 MP, f/1.8 + 8 MP, f/2.3 (ultrawide) + 2 MP, f/2.4 (macro)	8 MP, f/2.0	6000 mAh (Li-Po)	USB-C, 18 W	Android 10 (Realme UI 1.0)	Android 11 (Realme UI 2.0)
narzo 20 Pro	RMX2161	September 2020	IPS LCD, 90 Hz Corning Gorilla Glass	6.5"	1080 x 2400 (~405 ppi)	No	MediaTek Helio G95 2x 2.05 GHz Cortex-A76 + 6x 2.0 GHz Cortex-A55	Mali-G76 MC4 @900 MHz	6 GB; 8 GB (LPDDR4X)	64 GB; 128 GB (UFS 2.1)	48 MP, f/1.8 + 8 MP, f/2.3 (ultrawide) + 2 MP, f/2.4 (macro) + 2 MP, f/2.4 (depth)	16 MP, f/2.1	4500 mAh (Li-Po)	USB-C, 65 W	Android 10 (Realme UI 1.0)	Android 12 (Realme UI 3.0)
narzo 30A	RMX3171	March 2021	IPS LCD	6.5"	720 x 1600 (~270 ppi)	No	MediaTek Helio G85 2x 2.0 GHz Cortex-A75 + 6x 1.8 GHz Cortex-A55	Mali-G52 MC2 @1 GHz	3 GB; 4 GB (LPDDR4X)	32 GB; 64 GB (eMMC 5.1)	13 MP, f/2.2 + 2 MP, f/2.4 (depth)	8 MP, f/2.0	6000 mAh (Li-Po)	USB-C, 18 W	Android 10 (Realme UI 1.0)	Android 12 (Realme UI 3.0)
narzo 30 Pro 5G	RMX2117	March 2021	IPS LCD, 120 Hz Corning Gorilla Glass 3	6.5"	1080 x 2400 (~405 ppi)	Yes	MediaTek Dimensity 800U 2x 2.4 GHz Cortex-A76 + 6x 2.0 GHz Cortex-A55	Mali-G57 MC3 @850 MHz	6 GB; 8 GB (LPDDR4X)	64 GB; 128 GB (UFS 2.1)	48 MP, f/1.8 + 8 MP, f/2.3 (ultrawide) + 2 MP, f/2.4 (macro)	16 MP, f/2.1	5000 mAh (Li-Po)	USB-C, 30 W	Android 10 (Realme UI 1.0)	Android 12 (Realme UI 3.0)
narzo 30	RMX2156	May 2021	IPS LCD, 90 Hz	6.5"	1080 x 2400 (~405 ppi)	No	MediaTek Helio G95 2x 2.05 GHz Cortex-A76 + 6x 2.0 GHz Cortex-A55	Mali-G76 MC4 @900 MHz	4 GB; 6 GB (LPDDR4X)	64 GB; 128 GB	48 MP, f/1.8 + 2 MP, f/2.4 (macro) + 2 MP, f/2.4 (depth)	16 MP, f/2.1	5000 mAh (Li-Po)	USB-C, 30 W	Android 11 (Realme UI 2.0)	Android 13 (Realme UI 4.0)
narzo 30 5G Also: Realme 8 5G China: Q3i	RMX3242	June 2021	IPS LCD, 90 Hz	6.5"	1080 x 2400 (~405 ppi)	Yes	MediaTek Dimensity 700 2x 2.2 GHz Cortex-A76 + 6x 2.0 GHz Cortex-A55	Mali-G57 MC2 @950 MHz	4 GB; 6 GB (LPDDR4X)	64 GB; 128 GB	48 MP, f/1.8 + 2 MP, f/2.4 (macro) + 2 MP, f/2.4 (depth)	16 MP, f/2.1	5000 mAh (Li-Po)	USB-C, 18 W	Android 11 (Realme UI 2.0)	Android 13 (Realme UI 4.0)
narzo 50A	RMX3430	October 2021	IPS LCD, 90 Hz		720 x 1600 (~270 ppi)	No	MediaTek Helio G85 2x 2.0 GHz Cortex-A75 + 6x 1.8 GHz Cortex-A55	Mali-G52 MC2 @1 GHz	4 GB (LPDDR4X)	64 GB; 128 GB	50 MP, f/1.8 + 2 MP, f/2.4 (macro) + 2 MP, f/2.4 (depth)	8 MP, f/2.0	6000 mAh (Li-Po)	USB-C, 18 W	Android 11 (Realme UI 2.0)	Android 12 (Realme UI 3.0)
narzo 50i Also: C11 (2021)	RMX3235	October 2021	IPS LCD		720 x 1600 (~270 ppi)	No	UNISOC SC9863A 4x 1.6 GHz Cortex-A55 + 4x 1.2 GHz Cortex-A55	PowerVR GE8322 @550 MHz	2 GB; 4 GB	32 GB; 64 GB	8 MP, f/2.0	5 MP, f/2.2	5000 mAh (Li-Po)	microUSB, 10 W	Android 11 (Realme UI Go Edition)	
narzo 50 Also: Realme 8i	RMX3286	March 2022	IPS LCD, 120 Hz	6.6"	1080 x 2412 (~400 ppi)	No	MediaTek Helio G96 2x 2.05 GHz Cortex-A76 + 6x 2.0 GHz Cortex-A55	Mali-G57 MC2 @950 MHz	4 GB; 6 GB (LPDDR4X)	64 GB; 128 GB (UFS 2.1)	50 MP, f/1.8 + 2 MP, f/2.4 (macro) + 2 MP, f/2.4 (depth)	16 MP, f/2.1	5000 mAh (Li-Po)	USB-C, 33 W	Android 11 (Realme UI 2.0)	Android 13 (Realme UI 4.0)
narzo 50A Prime	RMX3516	March 2022	IPS LCD	6.6"	1080 x 2408 (~400 ppi)	No	UNISOC Tiger T612 2x 1.8 GHz Cortex-A75 + 6x 1.8 GHz Cortex-A55	Mali-G57 MC1	4 GB (LPDDR4X)	64 GB; 128 GB (UFS 2.2)	50 MP, f/1.8 + 2 MP, f/2.4 (macro) + 0.3, f/2.8 (depth)	8 MP, f/2.0	5000 mAh (Li-Po)	USB-C, 18 W	Android 12 (Realme UI 3.0)	Android 13 (Realme UI 4.0)
narzo 50 5G	RMX3571; RMX3572	May 2022	IPS LCD, 90 Hz	6.6"	1080 x 2408 (~400 ppi)	Yes	MediaTek Dimensity 810 2x 2.4 GHz Cortex-A76 + 6x 2.0 GHz Cortex-A55	Mali-G57 MC2 @950 MHz	4 GB; 6 GB (LPDDR4X)	64 GB; 128 GB	48 MP, f/1.8 + 2 MP, f/2.4 (depth)	8 MP, f/2.0	5000 mAh (Li-Po)	USB-C, 33 W	Android 12 (Realme UI 3.0)	Android 14 (Realme UI 5.0)
narzo 50 Pro	RMX3395	May 2022	Super AMOLED, 90 Hz Corning Gorilla Glass 5	6.4"	1080 x 2400 (~411 ppi)	Yes	MediaTek Dimensity 920 2x 2.5 GHz Cortex-A78 + 6x 2.0 GHz Cortex-A55	Mali-G68 MC4 @950 MHz	6 GB; 8 GB (LPDDR4X)	128 GB (UFS 2.2)	48 MP, f/1.8 + 8 MP, f/2.2 (ultrawide) + 2 MP, f/2.4 (macro)	16 MP, f/2.4	5000 mAh (Li-Po)	USB-C, 33 W	Android 12 (Realme UI 3.0)	Android 14 (Realme UI 5.0)
narzo 50i Prime Also: C30	RMX3506	June 2022	IPS LCD	6.5"	720 x 1600 (~270 ppi)	No	UNISOC Tiger T612 2x 1.8 GHz Cortex-A75 + 6x 1.8 GHz Cortex-A55	Mali-G57 MC1	3 GB; 4 GB (LPDDR4X)	32 GB; 64 GB (UFS 2.2)	8 MP, f/2.0	5 MP, f/2.2	5000 mAh (Li-Po)	microUSB, 10 W	Android 11 (Realme UI Go Edition)	
Narzo N55 Also: C55	RMX3761	April 2023	IPS LCD, 90 Hz	6.72"	1080 x 2400 (~392 ppi)	No	MediaTek Helio G88 2x 2.0 GHz Cortex-A75 + 6x 1.8 GHz Cortex-A55	Mali-G52 MC2 @1 GHz	4 GB; 6 GB 8 GB (LPDDR4X)	64 GB; 128 GB (eMMC 5.1)	64 MP, f/1.8 + 2 MP, f/2.4 (depth)	8 MP, f/2.0	5000 mAh (Li-Po)	USB-C, 33 W	Android 13 (Realme UI 4.0)	Android 15 (Realme UI 6.0)
Narzo N53	RMX3710	May 2023	IPS LCD, 90 Hz	6.74"	1080 x 2400 (~390 ppi)	No	UNISOC Tiger T612 2x 1.8 GHz Cortex-A75 + 6x 1.8 GHz Cortex-A55	Mali-G57 MC1	4 GB; 6 GB 8 GB (LPDDR4X)	64 GB; 128 GB (eMMC 5.1)	50 MP, f/1.8 + 0.3 MP (depth)	8 MP, f/2.0	5000 mAh (Li-Po)	USB-C, 33 W	Android 13 (Realme UI T Edition)	Android 14 (Realme UI 5.0)
Narzo 60 Pro Also: Realme 11 Pro	RMX3771	July 2023	AMOLED, 120Hz	6.7"	1080 x 2412 (~394 ppi)	Yes	MediaTek Dimensity 7050 2x 2.6 GHzCortex-A78+ 6x 2.0 GHz Cortex-A55	Mali-G68 MC4	8GB 12GB (LPDDR5)	128GB 256GB 1TB	100 MP, f/1.8 OIS + 2 MP, f/2.4 (depth)	16MP, f/2.5	5000 mAh (Li-Po)	USB-C, 67 W	Android 13 (Realme UI 4.0)	Android 15 (Realme UI 6.0)
Narzo 60 China: Realme 11	RMX3750	July 2023	Super AMOLED, 90Hz Corning Gorilla Glass 5	6.43"	1080 x 2400 (~409 ppi)	Yes	MediaTek Dimensity 6020 2x 2.2 GHz Cortex-A76+ 6x 2.0 GHz Cortex-A55	Mali-G57 MC2	8GB (LPDDR4X)	128GB 256GB (UFS 2.2)	64 MP, f/1.8 + 2 MP, f/2.4 (depth)	16MP, f/2.5	5000 mAh (Li-Po)	USB-C, 33 W	Android 13 (Realme UI 4.0)	Android 15 (Realme UI 6.0)
Narzo 60x Also: C67 5G	RMX3782	September 2023	IPS LCD, 120Hz	6.72"	1080 x 2400 (~392 ppi)	Yes	MediaTek Dimensity 6100+ 2x 2.2 GHzCortex-A76+ 6x 2.0 GHz Cortex-A55	Mali-G57 MC2	4GB 6GB (LPDDR4X)	128GB (UFS 2.2)	50 MP, f/1.8 + 2 MP, f/2.4 (depth)	8 MP, f/2.1	5000 mAh (Li-Po)	USB-C, 33 W	Android 13 (Realme UI 4.0)	Android 15 (Realme UI 6.0)
Narzo 70 Pro Also: Realme 12+	RMX3868	March 2024	AMOLED, 120Hz	6.67"	1080 x 2400 (~395 ppi)	Yes	MediaTek Dimensity 7050 2x 2.6 GHzCortex-A78+ 6x 2.0 GHz Cortex-A55	Mali-G68 MC4	8GB (LPDDR4X)	128GB 256GB 1TB	50 MP, f/1.9 OIS + 8 MP, f/2.2 (ultrawide) + 2 MP, f/2.4 (macro)	16 MP, f/2.5	5000 mAh (Li-Po)	USB-C, 67 W	Android 14 (Realme UI 5.0)	Android 15 (Realme UI 6.0)
Narzo 70	RMX3869	April 2024	AMOLED, 120Hz	6.67"	1080 x 2400 (~395 ppi)	Yes	MediaTek Dimensity 7050 2x 2.6 GHzCortex-A78+ 6x 2.0 GHz Cortex-A55	Mali-G68 MC4	6GB 8GB (LPDDR4X)	128GB 256GB (UFS 2.2)	50 MP, f/1.8 + 2 MP, f/2.4 (depth)	16 MP, f/2.5	5000 mAh (Li-Po)	USB-C, 45 W	Android 14 (Realme UI 5.0)	Android 15 (Realme UI 6.0)
Narzo 70x	RMX3998	April 2024	IPS LCD, 120Hz	6.72"	1080 x 2400 (~392 ppi)	Yes	MediaTek Dimensity 6100+ 2x 2.2 GHzCortex-A76+ 6x 2.0 GHz Cortex-A55	Mali-G57 MC2	4GB 6GB (LPDDR4X)	128GB (UFS 2.2)	50 MP, f/1.8 + 2 MP, f/2.4 (depth)	8MP, f/2.1	5000 mAh (Li-Po)	USB-C, 45 W	Android 14 (Realme UI 5.0)	Android 15 (Realme UI 6.0)
Narzo 70 Turbo Also: P1 Speed	RMX5003	September 2024	OLED, 120Hz	6.67"	1080 x 2400 (~395 ppi)	Yes	MediaTek Dimensity 7300 Energy 4x 2.5 GHz Cortex-A78 + 4x 2.0 GHz Cortex-A55	Mali-G615 MC2	6 GB 8 GB; 12 GB (LPDDR4X)	128GB 256GB (UFS 3.1)	50 MP, f/1.8 + 2 MP, f/2.4 (depth) + flicker sensor	16 MP, f/2.4	5000 mAh (Li-Po)	USB-C, 45 W	Android 14 (Realme UI 5.0)	Android 15 (Realme UI 6.0)
Narzo N65 Also: C65 5G Global: Realme 12x	RMX3997	May 2024	IPS LCD, 120 Hz	6.67"	720 x 1604 (~264 ppi)	Yes	MediaTek Dimensity 6100+ 2x 2.2 GHz Cortex-A76 + 6x 2.0 GHz Cortex-A55	Mali-G57 MC2	4 GB; 6 GB 8 GB (LPDDR4X)	128GB (UFS 2.2)	50 MP, f/1.8 + 2 MP, f/2.4 (depth)	8 MP, f/2.0	5000 mAh (Li-Po)	USB-C, 15 W	Android 14 (Realme UI 5.0)	Android 15 (Realme UI 6.0)
Narzo N63 Also: C63	RMX3939	June 2024	IPS LCD, 90 Hz	6.75"	720 x 1600 (~260 ppi)	No	MediaTek Helio G88 2x 2.0 GHz Cortex-A75 + 6x 1.8 GHz Cortex-A55	Mali-G52 MC2 @1 GHz	4 GB (LPDDR4X)	64 GB; 128 GB (eMMC 5.1)	64 MP, f/1.8 + 2 MP, f/2.4 (depth)	8 MP, f/2.0	5000 mAh (Li-Po)	USB-C, 45 W	Android 14 (Realme UI 5.0)	Android 14 (Realme UI 5.0)
Narzo N61 Also: C61 Global: Note 60	RMX3933	August 2024	IPS LCD, 90 Hz	6.74"	720 x 1600 (~259 ppi)	No	UNISOC Tiger T612 2x 1.8 GHz Cortex-A75 + 6x 1.8 GHz Cortex-A55	Mali-G57 MC1	4 GB; 6 GB (LPDDR4X)	64 GB; 128 GB (eMMC 5.1)	50 MP, f/1.8 + 0.3 MP (depth)	5 MP, f/2.2	5000 mAh (Li-Po)	USB-C, 10 W	Android 14 (Realme UI 5.0)	Android 14 (Realme UI 5.0)
Model	Model number	Release date	Display type	Display size	Display resolution	5G support	SoC	GPU	RAM	Internal Storage	Rear	Front	Battery	Charging	Initial	Latest
Model	Model number	Release date	Display type	Display size	Display resolution	5G support	SoC	GPU	RAM	Internal Storage	Camera		Battery	Charging	Operating system	

=== Note Series ===
Model	Model number	Release date	Display type	Display size	Display resolution	5G support	SoC	GPU	RAM	Internal Storage	Camera		Battery	Charging	Operating system	
Model	Model number	Release date	Display type	Display size	Display resolution	5G support	SoC	GPU	RAM	Internal Storage	Rear	Front	Battery	Charging	Initial	Latest
Note 50	RMX3834	January 2024	IPS LCD, 90 Hz	6.74"	720 x 1600 (~260 ppi)	No	UNISOC Tiger T612 2x 1.8 GHz Cortex-A75 + 6x 1.8 GHz Cortex-A55	Mali-G57 MC1	3 GB; 4 GB (LPDDR4X)	64 GB; 128 GB (eMMC 5.1)	13 MP, f/2.2 + 0.08 MP, f/3.0 (auxiliary lens)	5 MP, f/2.2	5000 mAh (Li-Po)	USB-C, 10 W	Android 13 (Realme UI T Edition)	Android 15 (Realme UI 6.0)
Note 60 India: C61 / Narzo N61	RMX3933	August 2024	IPS LCD, 90 Hz	6.74"	720 x 1600 (~260 ppi)	No	UNISOC Tiger T612 2x 1.8 GHz Cortex-A75 + 6x 1.8 GHz Cortex-A55	Mali-G57 MC1	4 GB; 6 GB 8 GB (LPDDR4X)	64 GB; 128 GB; 256 GB (eMMC 5.1)	32 MP, f/1.8 + Auxileary lens	5 MP, f/2.2	5000 mAh (Li-Po)	USB-C, 10 W	Android 14 (Realme UI 5.0)	
Note 60x	RMX3938	December 2024	IPS LCD, 90 Hz	6.74"	720 x 1600 (~260 ppi)	No	UNISOC Tiger T612 2x 1.8 GHz Cortex-A75 + 6x 1.8 GHz Cortex-A55	Mali-G57 MC1	4 GB (LPDDR4X)	64 GB; 128 GB (eMMC 5.1)	8 MP + Auxileary lens	5 MP, f/2.2	5000 mAh (Li-Po)	USB-C, 10 W	Android 14 (Realme UI 5.0)	
Note 70 India: C71	RMX5313	July 2025	IPS LCD, 90 Hz	6.74"	720 x 1600 (~260 ppi)	No	UNISOC Tiger T7250 2x 1.8 GHz Cortex-A75 + 6x 1.6 GHz Cortex-A55	Mali-G57 MC1	4 GB (LPDDR4X)	128 GB (eMMC 5.1)	13 MP, f/2.2 + Auxileary lens	5 MP, f/2.2	6300 mAh (Si/C Li-Ion)	USB-C, 15 W	Android 15 (Realme UI 6.0)	
Note 70T	RMX5313	July 2025	IPS LCD, 90 Hz	6.74"	720 x 1600 (~260 ppi)	No	UNISOC Tiger T7250 2x 1.8 GHz Cortex-A75 + 6x 1.6 GHz Cortex-A55	Mali-G57 MC1	4 GB (LPDDR4X)	64 GB; 128 GB; 256 GB (eMMC 5.1)	13 MP, f/2.2 + Auxileary lens	5 MP, f/2.2	6000 mAh (Si/C Li-Ion)	USB-C, 15 W	Android 15 (Realme UI 6.0)	
Model	Model number	Release date	Display type	Display size	Display resolution	5G support	SoC	GPU	RAM	Internal Storage	Rear	Front	Battery	Charging	Initial	Latest
Model	Model number	Release date	Display type	Display size	Display resolution	5G support	SoC	GPU	RAM	Internal Storage	Camera		Battery	Charging	Operating system	

=== P Series ===
Model name	Model number	Release date	Display type	Display size	Display resolution	5G support	SoC (Core/Freq)	GPU	RAM	Internal Storage	Camera		Battery	Charging	Operating system	
Model name	Model number	Release date	Display type	Display size	Display resolution	5G support	SoC (Core/Freq)	GPU	RAM	Internal Storage	Rear	Front	Battery	Charging	Initial	Latest
P1 Pro	RMX3844	April 2024	Curved AMOLED, 120 Hz	6.7"	1080 x 2412 (~394 ppi)	Yes	Qualcomm Snapdragon; 6 Gen 1 4x 2.2 GHz Cortex-A78 + 4x 1.8 GHz Cortex-A55	Adreno 710	8 GB; 12 GB (LPDDR4X)	128 GB; 256 GB; 512 GB (UFS 3.1)	50 MP, f/1.8 OIS + 8 MP, f/1.7 (ultrawide)	16 MP, f/2.4	5000 mAh (Li-Po)	USB-C, 45 W	Android 14 (Realme UI 5.0)	Android 15 (Realme UI 6.0)
P1	RMX3870	April 2024	AMOLED, 120 Hz	6.67"	1080 x 2400 (~395 ppi)	Yes	MediaTek Dimensity 7050 2x 2.6 GHz Cortex-A78 + 6x 2.0 GHz Cortex-A55	Mali-G68 MC4	6 GB; 8 GB (LPDDR4X)	128 GB; 256 GB; 512 GB (UFS 3.1)	50 MP, f/1.8 + 2 MP, f/2.4 (depth)	16 MP, f/2.5	5000 mAh (Li-Po)	USB-C, 45 W	Android 14 (Realme UI 5.0)	Android 15 (Realme UI 6.0)
P1 Speed (Narzo 70 Turbo)	RMX5004	October 2024	OLED, 120 Hz	6.67"	1080 x 2400 (~395 ppi)	Yes	MediaTek Dimensity 7300 (Energy) 4x 2.5 GHz Cortex-A78 + 4x 2.0 GHz Cortex-A55	Mali-G615 MC2	8 GB; 12 GB (LPDDR4X)	128 GB; 256 GB; 512 GB (UFS 3.1)	50 MP, f/1.8 + 2 MP, f/2.4 (depth) + flicker sensor	16 MP, f/2.4	5000 mAh (Li-Po)	USB-C, 45 W	Android 14 (Realme UI 5.0)	Android 15 (Realme UI 6.0)
P2 Pro	RMX3987	September 2024	Curved AMOLED, 120 Hz Corning Gorilla Glass 7i	6.7"	1080 x 2412 (~394 ppi)	Yes	Qualcomm Snapdragon; 7s Gen 2 4x 2.4 GHz Cortex-A78 + 4x 1.95 GHz Cortex-A55	Adreno 710	8 GB; 12 GB (LPDDR4X)	128 GB; 256 GB; 512 GB (UFS 2.2)	50 MP, f/1.9 OIS + 8 MP, f/2.2 (ultrawide)	32 MP, f/2.45	5200 mAh (Li-Po)	USB-C, 80 W	Android 14 (Realme UI 5.0)	Android 15 (Realme UI 6.0)
P3 Pro	RMX5032	February 2025	AMOLED, 120 Hz	6.83"	1272 x 2800 (~450 ppi)	Yes	Qualcomm Snapdragon; 7s Gen 3 1x 2.5 GHz Cortex-A720 + 3x 2.4 GHz Cortex-A720 + 4x 1.8 GHz Cortex-A520	Adreno 810 @ 940 MHz	8 GB; 12 GB (LPDDR4X)	128 GB; 256 GB; 512 GB (UFS 2.2)	50 MP, f/1.8 OIS + 2 MP, f/2.4 (depth)	16 MP, f/2.4	6000 mAh (Si/C Li-Ion)	USB-C, 80 W	Android 15 (Realme UI 6.0)	
P3x	RMX3944	February 2025	IPS LCD, 120 Hz ArmorShell	6.72"	1080 x 2400 (~392 ppi)	Yes	MediaTek Dimensity 6400 2x 2.5 GHz Cortex-A76 + 6x 2.0 GHz Cortex-A55	Mali-G57 MC2	8 GB; 12 GB (LPDDR4X)	128 GB; 256 GB (UFS 2.2)	50 MP, f/1.8 + 2 MP, f/2.4 (depth)	8 MP	6000 mAh (Si/C Li-Ion)	USB-C, 45 W	Android 15 (Realme UI 6.0)	
P3 (China: Realme 14)	RMX5070	March 2025	AMOLED, 120 Hz	6.67"	1080 x 2400 (~395 ppi)	Yes	Qualcomm Snapdragon; 6 Gen 4 1x 2.3 GHz Cortex-A720 + 3x 2.2 GHz Cortex-A720 + 4x 1.8 GHz Cortex-A520	Adreno 810	6 GB; 8 GB (LPDDR4X)	128 GB; 256 GB (UFS 3.1)	50 MP, f/1.8 + 2 MP, f/2.4 (depth)	16 MP, f/2.4	6000 mAh (Si/C Li-Ion)	USB-C, 45 W	Android 15 (Realme UI 6.0)	
P3 Ultra	RMX5030	March 2025	AMOLED, 120 Hz Corning Gorilla Glass 7i	6.83"	1272 x 2800 (~450 ppi)	Yes	MediaTek Dimensity 8350 (Ultra) 1x 3.35 GHz Cortex-A715 + 3x 3.2 GHz Cortex-A715 + 4x 2.2 GHz Cortex-A510	Mali-G615 MC6	8 GB; 12 GB (LPDDR4X)	128 GB; 256 GB; 512 GB (UFS 3.1)	50 MP, f/1.8 OIS + 8 MP, f/2.2 (ultrawide)	16 MP, f/2.4	6000 mAh (Si/C Li-Ion)	USB-C, 80 W	Android 15 (Realme UI 6.0)	
Model name	Model number	Release date	Display type	Display size	Display resolution	5G support	SoC (Core/Freq)	GPU	RAM	Internal Storage	Rear	Front	Battery	Charging	Initial	Latest
Model name	Model number	Release date	Display type	Display size	Display resolution	5G support	SoC (Core/Freq)	GPU	RAM	Internal Storage	Camera		Battery	Charging	Operating system	

=== X Series ===
Model	Model number	Release date	Display type	Display size	Display resolution	5G support	SoC	GPU	RAM	Internal Storage	Camera		Battery	Charging	Operating system	
Model	Model number	Release date	Display type	Display size	Display resolution	5G support	SoC	GPU	RAM	Internal Storage	Rear	Front	Battery	Charging	Initial	Latest
X	RMX1901; RMX1903	May 2019	AMOLED Corning Gorilla Glass 5	6.53"	1080 x 2340 (~394 ppi)	No	Qualcomm Snapdragon 710 2x 2.2 GHz Cortex-A75 + 6x 1.7 GHz Cortex-A55	Adreno 616 @750 MHz	4 GB; 6 GB; 8 GB (LPDDR4X)	64 GB; 128 GB; 256 GB (UFS 2.1)	48 MP, f/1.7 + 5 MP, f/2.4 (depth)	16 MP, f/2.0	3765 mAh (Li-Po)	USB-C, 20 W	Android 9 (ColorOS 6.0)	Android 11 (Realme UI 2.0)
X Lite Global: Realme 3	RMX1851	May 2019	IPS LCD, Corning Gorilla Glass 5	6.3"	1080 x 2340 (~409 ppi)	No	Qualcomm Snapdragon 710 2x 2.2 GHz Cortex-A75 + 6x 1.7 GHz Cortex-A55	Adreno 616 @750 MHz	4 GB; 6 GB; 8 GB (LPDDR4X)	64 GB; 128 GB (eMMC 5.1)	16 MP, f/1.7 + 5 MP, f/2.4 (depth)	25 MP, f/2.0	4065 mAh (Li-Po)	microUSB, 20 W	Android 9 (ColorOS 6.0)	Android 11 (Realme UI 2.0)
XT	RMX1921	September 2019	Super AMOLED Corning Gorilla Glass 5	6.4"	1080 x 2340 (~403 ppi)	No	Qualcomm Snapdragon 712 2x 2.3 GHz Cortex-A75 + 6x 1.7 GHz Cortex-A55	Adreno 616 @750 MHz	4 GB; 6 GB; 8 GB (LPDDR4X)	64 GB; 128 GB (UFS 2.1)	64 MP, f/1.8 + 8 MP, f/2.3 (ultrawide) + 2 MP, f/2.4 (macro) + 2 MP, f/2.4 (depth)	16 MP, f/2.0	4000 mAh (Li-Po)	USB-C, 20 W	Android 9 (ColorOS 6.0)	Android 11 (Realme UI 2.0)
X2	RMX1991; RMX1992; RMX1993	September 2019	Super AMOLED Corning Gorilla Glass 5	6.4"	1080 x 2340 (~403 ppi)	No	Qualcomm Snapdragon 730G 2x 2.2 GHz Cortex-A76 + 6x 1.8 GHz Cortex-A55	Adreno 618 @825 MHz		64 GB; 128 GB; 256 GB (UFS 2.1)		32 MP, f/2.0		USB-C, 30 W	Android 9 (ColorOS 6.0)	Android 11 (Realme UI 2.0)
X2 Pro	RMX1931	October 2019	Super AMOLED, 90 Hz Corning Gorilla Glass 5	6.5"	1080 x 2400 (~402 ppi)		Qualcomm Snapdragon 855+ 1x 2.96 GHz + 3x 2.42 GHz + 4x 1.80 GHz	Adreno 640	6 GB; 8 GB; 12 GB (LPDDR4X)	64 GB (UFS 2.1) 128 GB; 256 GB (UFS 3.0)	64 MP, f/1.8 + 13 MP, f/2.5 (telephoto) + 8 MP, f/2.2 (ultrawide) + 2 MP, f/2.4 (depth)	16 MP, f/2.0		USB-C, 50 W	Android 9 (ColorOS 6.0)	Android 11 (Realme UI 2.0)
X50 5G (China)	RMX2025; RMX2051	January 2020	IPS LCD, 120 Hz Corning Gorilla Glass 5	6.57"	1080 x 2400 (~401 ppi)	Yes	Qualcomm Snapdragon 765G 1x 2.4 GHz Cortex-A76 + 1x 2.2 GHz Cortex-A76 + 6x 1.8 GHz Cortex-A55	Adreno 620	6 GB; 8 GB; 12 GB (LPDDR4X)	64 GB; 128 GB; 256 GB (UFS 2.1)	64 MP, f/1.8 + 12 MP, f/3.0 (telephoto) + 8 MP, f/2.3 (ultrawide) + 2 MP, f/2.4 (macro)	16 MP, f/2.0 + 8 MP, f/2.2 (ultrawide)	4200 mAh (Li-Po)	USB-C, 30 W	Android 10 (Realme UI 1.0)	Android 12 (Realme UI 3.0)
X50 Pro 5G	RMX2071; RMX2075; RMX2076	March 2020	Super AMOLED, 120 Hz Corning Gorilla Glass 5	6.44"	1080 x 2400 (~409 ppi)	Yes	Qualcomm Snapdragon 865 1x 2.84 GHz + 3x 2.42 GHz + 4x 1.80 GHz	Adreno 650	6 GB; 8 GB; 12 GB	128 GB; 256 GB (UFS 3.0)	64 MP, f/1.8 + 12 MP, f/2.5 (telephoto) + 8 MP, f/2.3 (ultrawide) + 2 MP, f/2.4 (depth)	32 MP, f/2.5 + 8 MP, f/2.2 (ultrawide)	4200 mAh (Li-Po)	USB-C, 65 W	Android 10 (Realme UI 1.0)	Android 12 (Realme UI 3.0)
X50m/X50t		April 2020	IPS LCD, 120 Hz	6.57"	1080 x 2400 (~399 ppi)	Yes	Qualcomm Snapdragon 765G 1x 2.4 GHz Cortex-A76 + 1x 2.2 GHz Cortex-A76 + 6x 1.8 GHz Cortex-A55	Adreno 620	6 GB; 8 GB (LPDDR4X)	128 GB (UFS 2.1)	48 MP, f/1.8 + 8 MP, f/2.3 (ultrawide) + 2 MP, f/2.4 (macro) + 2 MP, f/2.4 (depth)	16 MP, f/2.0 + 2 MP, f/2.4 (depth)	4200 mAh (Li-Po)	USB-C, 30 W	Android 10 (Realme UI 1.0)	Android 12 (Realme UI 3.0)
X50 Pro Play	RMX2072	June 2020	Super AMOLED, 90 Hz	6.44"	1080 x 2400 (~409 ppi)	Yes	Qualcomm Snapdragon 865 1x 2.84 GHz + 3x 2.42 GHz + 4x 1.80 GHz	Adreno 650	6 GB; 8 GB; 12 GB	128 GB (UFS 3.1)	48 MP, f/1.8 + 8 MP, f/2.3 (ultrawide) + 2 MP, f/2.4 (macro) + 2 MP, f/2.4 (depth)	16 MP, f/2.0 + 2 MP, f/2.4 (depth)	4200 mAh (Li-Po)	USB-C, 65 W	Android 10 (Realme UI 1.0)	Android 12 (Realme UI 3.0)
X50 5G	RMX2144	July 2020	IPS LCD, 120 Hz	6.57"	1080 x 2400 (~401 ppi)	Yes	Qualcomm Snapdragon 765G 1x 2.4 GHz Cortex-A76 + 1x 2.2 GHz Cortex-A76 + 6x 1.8 GHz Cortex-A55	Adreno 620	6 GB; 8 GB (LPDDR4X)	128 GB (UFS 2.1)	48 MP, f/1.8 + 8 MP, f/2.3 (ultrawide) + 2 MP, f/2.4 (macro) + 2 MP, f/2.4 (depth)	16 MP, f/2.0 + 2 MP, f/2.4 (depth)	4200 mAh (Li-Po)	USB-C, 30 W	Android 10 (Realme UI 1.0)	Android 12 (Realme UI 3.0)
X3	RMX2081; RMX2083; RMX2085; RMX2142	June 2020	IPS LCD, 120 Hz Corning Gorilla Glass 5	6.6"	1080 x 2400 (~399 ppi)	No	Qualcomm Snapdragon 855+ 1x 2.96 GHz + 3x 2.42 GHz + 4x 1.80 GHz	Adreno 640	6 GB; 8 GB (LPDDR4X)	128 GB (UFS 3.0)	64 MP, f/1.8 + 12 MP, f/2.5 (telephoto) + 8 MP, f/2.3 (ultrawide) + 2 MP, f/2.4 (macro)	16 MP, f/2.0 + 8 MP, f/2.2 (ultrawide)	4200 mAh (Li-Po)	USB-C, 30 W	Android 10 (Realme UI 1.0)	Android 12 (Realme UI 3.0)
X3 SuperZoom	RMX2086	June 2020	IPS LCD, 120 Hz Corning Gorilla Glass 5	6.6"	1080 x 2400 (~399 ppi)	No	Qualcomm Snapdragon 855+ 1x 2.96 GHz + 3x 2.42 GHz + 4x 1.80 GHz	Adreno 640	8 GB; 12 GB (LPDDR4X)	128 GB; 256 GB (UFS 3.0)	64 MP, f/1.8 + 8 MP, f/3.4 (periscope telephoto) + 8 MP, f/2.3 (ultrawide) + 2 MP, f/2.4 (macro)	32 MP, f/2.5 + 8 MP, f/2.2 (ultrawide)	4200 mAh (Li-Po)	USB-C, 30 W	Android 10 (Realme UI 1.0)	Android 12 (Realme UI 3.0)
X7	RMX2176	September 2020	AMOLED Corning Gorilla Glass	6.4"	1080 x 2400 (~411 ppi)	Yes	MediaTek Dimensity 800U 2x 2.4 GHz Cortex-A76 + 6x 2.0 GHz Cortex-A55	Mali-G57 MC3 @850 MHz	6 GB; 8 GB (LPDDR4X)	128 GB (UFS 2.1)	64 MP, f/1.8 + 8 MP, f/2.3 (ultrawide) + 2 MP, f/2.4 (macro) + 2 MP, f/2.4 (depth)	32 MP, f/2.5	4300 mAh (Li-Po)	USB-C, 65 W	Android 10 (Realme UI 1.0)	Android 12 (Realme UI 3.0)
X7 Pro	RMX2111; RMX2121	September 2020	Super AMOLED, 120 Hz Corning Gorilla Glass	6.55"	1080 x 2400 (~402 ppi)	Yes	MediaTek Dimensity 1000+ 4x 2.6 GHz Cortex-A77 + 4x 2.0 GHz Cortex-A55	Mali-G77 MC9 @836 MHz	6 GB; 8 GB (LPDDR4X)	128 GB; 256 GB (UFS 2.1)	64 MP, f/1.8 + 8 MP, f/2.3 (ultrawide) + 2 MP, f/2.4 (macro) + 2 MP, f/2.4 (depth)	32 MP, f/2.5	4500 mAh (Li-Po)	USB-C, 65 W	Android 10 (Realme UI 1.0)	Android 12 (Realme UI 3.0)
X7 (India) China: V15	RMX3092	February 2021	Super AMOLED	6.4"	1080 x 2400 (~411 ppi)	Yes	MediaTek Dimensity 800U 2x 2.4 GHz Cortex-A76 + 6x 2.0 GHz Cortex-A55	Mali-G57 MC3 @850 MHz	6 GB; 8 GB (LPDDR4X)	128 GB (UFS 2.1)	64 MP, f/1.8 + 8 MP, f/2.3 (ultrawide) + 2 MP, f/2.4 (macro)	16 MP, f/2.5	4310 mAh (Li-Po)	USB-C, 50 W	Android 10 (Realme UI 1.0)	Android 12 (Realme UI 3.0)
X7 Pro Ultra	RMX3115	April 2021	Super AMOLED, 90 Hz Corning Gorilla Glass 5	6.55"	1080 x 2400 (~402 ppi)	Yes	MediaTek Dimensity 1000+ 4x 2.6 GHz Cortex-A77 + 4x 2.0 GHz Cortex-A55	Mali-G77 MC9 @836 MHz	8 GB; 12 GB (LPDDR4X)	128 GB; 256 GB (UFS 2.1)	64 MP, f/1.8 + 8 MP, f/2.3 (ultrawide) + 2 MP, f/2.4 (macro)	32 MP, f/2.5	4500 mAh (Li-Po)	USB-C, 65 W	Android 11 (Realme UI 2.0)	Android 13 (Realme UI 4.0)
X7 Max China: Realme GT Neo	RMX3031	June 2021	Super AMOLED, 120 Hz Dragontrail Glass	6.43"	1080 x 2400 (~409 ppi)	Yes	MediaTek Dimensity 1200 1x 3.0 GHz Cortex-A78 + 3x 2.6 GHz Cortex-A78 + 4x 2.0 GHz Cortex-A55	Mali-G77 MC9 @886 MHz	8 GB; 12 GB (LPDDR4X)	128 GB; 256 GB (UFS 3.1)	64 MP, f/1.8 + 8 MP, f/2.3 (ultrawide) + 2 MP, f/2.4 (macro)	16 MP, f/2.5	4500 mAh (Li-Po)	USB-C, 50 W	Android 11 (Realme UI 2.0)	Android 13 (Realme UI 4.0)
Model	Model number	Release date	Display type	Display size	Display resolution	5G support	SoC	GPU	RAM	Internal Storage	Rear	Front	Battery	Charging	Initial	Latest
Model	Model number	Release date	Display type	Display size	Display resolution	5G support	SoC	GPU	RAM	Internal Storage	Camera		Battery	Charging	Operating system	

=== Q Series ===
Model	Model number	Release date	Display type	Display size	Display resolution	5G support	SoC	GPU	RAM	Internal Storage	Camera		Battery	Charging	Operating system	
Model	Model number	Release date	Display type	Display size	Display resolution	5G support	SoC	GPU	RAM	Internal Storage	Rear	Front	Battery	Charging	Initial	Latest
Q Global: Realme 5 Pro	RMX1971	September 2019	IPS LCD Corning Gorilla Glass 3+	6.3"	1080 x 2340 (~409 ppi)	No	Qualcomm Snapdragon 712 2x 2.3 GHz Cortex-A75 + 6x 1.7 GHz Cortex-A55	Adreno 616 @750 MHz	4 GB; 6 GB; 8 GB (LPDDR4X)	64 GB; 128 GB	48 MP, f/1.8 + 8 MP, f/2.2 (ultrawide) + 2 MP, f/2.4 (macro) + 2 MP, f/2.4 (depth)	16 MP, f/2.0	4035 mAh (Li-Po)	USB-C, 20 W	Android 9 (ColorOS 6.0)	Android 11 (Realme UI 2.0)
Q2	RMX2117	October 2020	IPS LCD, 120 Hz	6.5"	1080 x 2400 (~405 ppi)	Yes	MediaTek Dimensity 800U 2x 2.4 GHz Cortex-A76 + 6x 2.0 GHz Cortex-A55	Mali-G57 MC3 @850 MHz	4 GB; 6 GB (LPDDR4X)	128 GB (UFS 2.1)	48 MP, f/1.8 + 8 MP, f/2.3 (ultrawide) + 2 MP, f/2.4 (macro)	16 MP, f/2.1	5000 mAh (Li-Po)	USB-C, 30 W	Android 10 (Realme UI 1.0)	Android 12 (Realme UI 2.0)
Q2 Pro	RMX2173	October 2020	Super AMOLED Corning Gorilla Glass	6.4"	1080 x 2400 (~411 ppi)	Yes	MediaTek Dimensity 800U 2x 2.4 GHz Cortex-A76 + 6x 2.0 GHz Cortex-A55	Mali-G57 MC3 @850 MHz	8 GB (LPDDR4X)	128 GB; 256 GB (UFS 2.1)	48 MP, f/1.8 + 8 MP, f/2.3 (ultrawide) + 2 MP, f/2.4 (depth) + 2 MP, f/2.4 (macro)	16 MP, f/2.5	4300 mAh (Li-Po)	USB-C, 65 W	Android 10 (Realme UI 1.0)	Android 12 (Realme UI 2.0)
Q2i Also: V3	RMX2200	October 2020	IPS LCDCorning Gorilla Glass	6.5"	720 x 1600 (~270 ppi)	Yes	MediaTek Dimensity 720 2x 2.0 GHz Cortex-A76 + 6x 2.0 GHz Cortex-A55	Mali-G57 MC3 @850 MHz	4 GB (LPDDR4X)	128 GB (UFS 2.1)	13 MP, f/2.2 + 2 MP, f/2.4 (macro) + 2 MP, f/2.4 (depth)	8 MP, f/2.0	5000 mAh (Li-Po)	USB-C, 18 W	Android 10 (Realme UI 1.0)	Android 12 (Realme UI 2.0)
Q3	RMX3161	April 2021	IPS LCD, 120 Hz	6.5"	1080 x 2400 (~405 ppi)	Yes	Qualcomm Snapdragon 750G 2x 2.2 GHz Cortex-A77 + 6x 1.8 GHz Cortex-A55	Adreno 619 @950 MHz	6 GB; 8 GB (LPDDR4X)	128 GB	48 MP, f/1.8 + 8 MP, f/2.3 (ultrawide) + 2 MP, f/2.4 (macro)	16 MP, f/2.1	5000 mAh (Li-Po)	USB-C, 30 W	Android 11 (Realme UI 2.0)	Android 13 (Realme UI 4.0)
Q3i Global: Realme 8 5G / narzo 30 5G	RMX3042	April 2021	IPS LCD, 90 Hz	6.5"	1080 x 2400 (~405 ppi)	Yes	MediaTek Dimensity 700 2x 2.2 GHz Cortex-A76 + 6x 2.0 GHz Cortex-A55	Mali-G57 MC2 @950 MHz	4 GB; 6 GB (LPDDR4X)	128 GB (UFS 2.1)	48 MP, f/1.8 + 2 MP, f/2.4 (macro) + 2 MP, f/2.4 (depth)	16 MP, f/2.1	5000 mAh (Li-Po)	USB-C, 18 W	Android 11 (Realme UI 2.0)	Android 13 (Realme UI 4.0)
Q3 Pro	RMX2205	April 2021	Super AMOLED, 90 Hz	6.43"	1080 x 2400 (~409 ppi)	Yes	MediaTek Dimensity 1100 4x 2.6 GHz Cortex-A78 + 4x 2.0 GHz Cortex-A55	Mali-G77 MC9 @836 MHz	6 GB; 8 GB (LPDDR4X)	128 GB; 256 GB (UFS 3.1)	64 MP, f/1.8 + 8 MP, f/2.3 (ultrawide) + 2 MP, f/2.4 (macro)	16 MP, f/2.5	4500 mAh (Li-Po)	USB-C, 30 W	Android 11 (Realme UI 2.0)	Android 13 (Realme UI 4.0)
Q3 Pro Special	RMX3142	June 2021	Super AMOLED, 120 Hz	6.43"	1080 x 2400 (~409 ppi)	Yes	Qualcomm Snapdragon 768G 1x 2.8 GHz Cortex-A76 + 1x 2.4 GHz Cortex-A76 + 6x 1.8 GHz Cortex-A55	Adreno 620 @750 MHz	8 GB; 12 GB (LPDDR4X)	128 GB; 256 GB (UFS 2.2)	64 MP, f/1.8 + 8 MP, f/2.3 (ultrawide) + 2 MP, f/2.4 (macro)	32 MP	4500 mAh (Li-Po)	USB-C, 50 W	Android 11 (Realme UI 2.0)	Android 13 (Realme UI 4.0)
Q3s India: Realme 9 5G Speed Edition	RMX3461	November 2021	IPS LCD, 144 Hz	6.6"	1080 x 2412 (~400 ppi)	Yes	Qualcomm Snapdragon 778G 1x 2.4 GHz Cortex-A78 + 3x 2.2 GHz Cortex-A78 + 4x 1.9 GHz Cortex-A55	Adreno 642L @950 MHz	6 GB; 8 GB (LPDDR4X)	128 GB; 256 GB (UFS 2.2)	48 MP, f/1.8 + 2 MP, f/2.4 (macro) + 2 MP, f/2.4 (depth)	16 MP, f/2.1	5000 mAh (Li-Po)	USB-C, 30 W	Android 11 (Realme UI 2.0)	Android 13 (Realme UI 4.0)
Q3t	RMX3462	November 2021	IPS LCD, 144 Hz	6.6"	1080 x 2412 (~400 ppi)	Yes	Qualcomm Snapdragon 778G 1x 2.4 GHz Cortex-A78 + 3x 2.2 GHz Cortex-A78 + 4x 1.9 GHz Cortex-A55	Adreno 642L @950 MHz	8 GB (LPDDR4X)	256 GB (UFS 2.2)	48 MP, f/1.8 + 2 MP, f/2.4 (macro) + 2 MP, f/2.4 (depth)	16 MP, f/2.1	5000 mAh (Li-Po)	USB-C, 30 W	Android 11 (Realme UI 2.0)	Android 13 (Realme UI 4.0)
Q5 / (Q5 Special) Global: Realme 9 5G	RMX3478	April 2022	IPS LCD, 120 Hz	6.6"	1080 x 2412 (~400 ppi)	Yes	Qualcomm Snapdragon 695 4x 2.2 GHz Cortex-A78 + 4x 1.7 GHz Cortex-A55	Adreno 619	6 GB; 8 GB 12 GB (Q5 Special only) (LPDDR4X)	128 GB; 256 GB (UFS 2.2)	50 MP, f/1.8 + 2 MP, f/2.4 (macro) + 2 MP, f/2.4 (depth)	16 MP, f/2.1	5000 mAh (Li-Po)	USB-C, 60 W	Android 12 (Realme UI 3.0)	Android 14 (Realme UI 5.0)
Q5 Pro Global: GT Neo3T	RMX3372	April 2022	AMOLED, 120 Hz	6.62"	1080 x 2400 (~398 ppi)	Yes	Qualcomm Snapdragon 870 1x 3.20 GHz + 3x 2.42 GHz + 4x 1.80 GHz	Adreno 650 @670 MHz	6 GB; 8 GB (LPDDR4X)	128 GB; 256 GB (UFS 3.1)	64 MP, f/1.8 + 8 MP, f/2.25 (ultrawide) + 2 MP, f/2.4 (macro)	16 MP, f/2.5	5000 mAh (Li-Po)	USB-C, 80 W	Android 12 (Realme UI 3.0)	Android 14 (Realme UI 5.0)
Q5i	RMX3574	April 2022	IPS LCD, 90 Hz	6.58"	1080 x 2400 (~401 ppi)	Yes	MediaTek Dimensity 810 2x 2.4 GHz Cortex-A76 + 6x 2.0 GHz Cortex-A55	Mali-G57 MC2 @950 MHz	4 GB; 6 GB (LPDDR4X)	128 GB (UFS 2.2)	13 MP, f/2.2 + 2 MP, f/2.4 (depth)	8 MP, f/2.0	5000 mAh (Li-Po)	USB-C, 33 W	Android 12 (Realme UI 3.0)	Android 14 (Realme UI 5.0)
Q5x	RMX3616	June 2022	IPS LCD	6.5"	720 x 1600 (~270 ppi)	Yes	MediaTek Dimensity 700 2x 2.2 GHz Cortex-A76 + 6x 2.0 GHz Cortex-A55	Mali-G57 MC2 @950 MHz	4 GB (LPDDR4X)	64 GB (UFS 2.2)	13 MP, f/2.2 + 0.3 MP, f/2.8 (depth)	5 MP	5000 mAh (Li-Po)	USB-C, 10 W	Android 12 (Realme UI 3.0)	Android 14 (Realme UI 5.0)
Model	Model number	Release date	Display type	Display size	Display resolution	5G support	SoC	GPU	RAM	Internal Storage	Rear	Front	Battery	Charging	Initial	Latest
Model	Model number	Release date	Display type	Display size	Display resolution	5G support	SoC	GPU	RAM	Internal Storage	Camera		Battery	Charging	Operating system	

=== V Series ===
Model	Model number	Release date	Display type	Display size	Display resolution	5G support	SoC	GPU	RAM	Internal Storage	Camera		Battery	Charging	Operating system	
Model	Model number	Release date	Display type	Display size	Display resolution	5G support	SoC	GPU	RAM	Internal Storage	Rear	Front	Battery	Charging	Initial	Latest
V5	RMX2111	August 2020	IPS LCD, 90 Hz	6.5"	1080 x 2400 (~405 ppi)	Yes	MediaTek Dimensity 720 2x 2.0 GHz Cortex-A76 + 6x 2.0 GHz Cortex-A55	Mali-G57 MC3 @850 MHz	6 GB; 8 GB (LPDDR4X)	128 GB (UFS 2.1)	48 MP, f/1.8 + 8 MP, f/2.3 (ultrawide) + 2 MP, f/2.4 (depth) + 2 MP, f/2.4 (macro)	16 MP, f/2.1	5000 mAh (Li-Po)	USB-C, 30 W	Android 10 (Realme UI 1.0)	Android 12 (Realme UI 2.0)
V3 Also: Q2i	RMX2200	September 2024	IPS LCD Corning Gorilla Glass	6.52"	720 x 1600 (~270 ppi)	Yes	MediaTek Dimensity 720 2x 2.0 GHz Cortex-A76 + 6x 2.0 GHz Cortex-A55	Mali-G57 MC3 @850 MHz	6 GB; 8 GB (LPDDR4X)	128 GB (UFS 2.1)	13 MP, f/2.2 + 2 MP, f/2.4 (macro) + 2 MP, f/2.4 (depth)	8 MP, f/2.0	5000 mAh (Li-Po)	USB-C, 18 W	Android 10 (Realme UI 1.0)	Android 12 (Realme UI 2.0)
V15 India: X7	RMX3092 RMX3093	January 2021	Super AMOLED	6.43"	1080 x 2400 (~411 ppi)	Yes	MediaTek Dimensity 800U 2x 2.4 GHz Cortex-A76 + 6x 2.0 GHz Cortex-A55	Mali-G57 MC3 @850 MHz	6 GB; 8 GB (LPDDR4X)	128 GB (UFS 2.1)	64 MP, f/1.8 + 8 MP, f/2.3 (ultrawide) + 2 MP, f/2.4 (macro)	16 MP, f/2.5	4310 mAh (Li-Po)	USB-C, 50 W	Android 10 (Realme UI 1.0)	Android 12 (Realme UI 3.0)
V11	RMX3121 RMX3122	February 2021	IPS LCD	6.52"	720 x 1600 (~270 ppi)	Yes	MediaTek Dimensity 700 2x 2.2 GHz Cortex-A76 + 6x 2.0 GHz Cortex-A55	Mali-G57 MC2 @950 MHz	4 GB; 6 GB (LPDDR4X)	128 GB (UFS 2.2)	13 MP, f/2.2) + 2 MP, f/2.4 (depth)	8 MP, f/2.0	5000 mAh (Li-Po)	USB-C, 18 W	Android 11 (Realme UI 2.0)	Android 13 (Realme UI 4.0)
V13	RMX3041	April 2021	IPS LCD, 90 Hz	6.5"	1080 x 2400 (~405 ppi)	Yes	MediaTek Dimensity 700 2x 2.2 GHz Cortex-A76 + 6x 2.0 GHz Cortex-A55	Mali-G57 MC2 @950 MHz	8 GB (LPDDR4X)	128 GB; 256 GB (UFS 2.2)	48 MP, f/1.8 + 2 MP, f/2.4 (depth) + 2 MP, f/2.4 (macro)	8 MP, f/2.0	5000 mAh (Li-Po)	USB-C, 18 W	Android 11 (Realme UI 2.0)	Android 13 (Realme UI 4.0)
V11s	RMX3125	September 2021	IPS LCD	6.52"	720 x 1600 (~270 ppi)	Yes	MediaTek Dimensity 810 2x 2.4 GHz Cortex-A76 + 6x 2.0 GHz Cortex-A55	Mali-G57 MC2 @950 MHz	4 GB; 6 GB (LPDDR4X)	128 GB (UFS 2.2)	13 MP, f/2.2) + 2 MP, f/2.4 (depth)	8 MP, f/2.0	5000 mAh (Li-Po)	USB-C, 18 W	Android 11 (Realme UI 2.0)	Android 13 (Realme UI 4.0)
V25 Global: Realme 9 Pro	RMX3475	March 2022	IPS LCD, 120 Hz	6.59"	1080 x 2412 (~401 ppi)	Yes	Qualcomm Snapdragon 695 4x 2.2 GHz Cortex-A78 + 4x 1.7 GHz Cortex-A55	Adreno 619	12 GB (LPDDR4X)	256 GB (UFS 2.2)	64 MP, f/1.8 + 2 MP, f/2.4 (depth) + 2 MP, f/2.4 (macro)	16 MP, f/2.1	5000 mAh (Li-Po)	USB-C, 33 W	Android 12 (Realme UI 3.0)	Android 14 (Realme UI 5.0)
V23	RMX3571	April 2022	IPS LCD, 90 Hz	6.58"	1080 x 2408 (~401 ppi)	Yes	MediaTek Dimensity 810 2x 2.4 GHz Cortex-A76 + 6x 2.0 GHz Cortex-A55	Mali-G57 MC2 @950 MHz	8 GB; 12 GB (LPDDR4X)	256 GB (UFS 2.2)	48 MP, f/1.8 + 2 MP, f/2.4 (depth)	8 MP	5000 mAh (Li-Po)	USB-C, 33 W	Android 12 (Realme UI 3.0)	Android 14 (Realme UI 5.0)
V23i	RMX3576	May 2022	IPS LCD	6.56"	720 x 1612 (~269 ppi)	Yes	MediaTek Dimensity 700 2x 2.2 GHz Cortex-A76 + 6x 2.0 GHz Cortex-A55	Mali-G57 MC2 @950 MHz	4 GB; 8 GB (LPDDR4X)	128 GB; 256 GB (UFS 2.2)	13 MP, f/2.2) + 2 MP, f/2.4 (depth)	8 MP	5000 mAh (Li-Po)	USB-C, 10 W	Android 12 (Realme UI 3.0)	Android 14 (Realme UI 5.0)
V20	RMX3610 RMX3611	June 2022	IPS LCD	6.5"	720 x 1600 (~270 ppi)	Yes	MediaTek Dimensity 700 2x 2.2 GHz Cortex-A76 + 6x 2.0 GHz Cortex-A55	Mali-G57 MC2 @950 MHz	4 GB; 8 GB (LPDDR4X)	128 GB (UFS 2.2)	13 MP, f/2.2 + 0.3 MP, f/2.8 (depth)	5 MP	5000 mAh (Li-Po)	USB-C, 10 W	Android 12 (Realme UI 3.0)	Android 14 (Realme UI 5.0)
V30	RMX3619	February 2023	IPS LCD	6.52"	720 x 1600 (~269 ppi)	Yes	MediaTek Dimensity 700 2x 2.2 GHz Cortex-A76 + 6x 2.0 GHz Cortex-A55	Mali-G57 MC2 @950 MHz	6 GB; 8 GB (LPDDR4X)	128 GB (UFS 2.2)	13 MP, f/2.2 + 0.3 MP, f/2.8 (depth)	5 MP	5000 mAh (Li-Po)	USB-C, 10 W	Android 12 (Realme UI 3.0)	Android 14 (Realme UI 5.0)
V30t	RMX3618	February 2023	IPS LCD	6.52"	720 x 1600 (~269 ppi)	Yes	MediaTek Dimensity 700 2x 2.2 GHz Cortex-A76 + 6x 2.0 GHz Cortex-A55	Mali-G57 MC2 @950 MHz	6 GB; 8 GB (LPDDR4X)	128 GB (UFS 2.2)	13 MP, f/2.2 + 0.3 MP, f/2.8 (depth)	5 MP	5000 mAh (Li-Po)	USB-C, 10 W	Android 12 (Realme UI 3.0)	Android 14 (Realme UI 5.0)
V50	RMX3783	December 2023	IPS LCD, 120 Hz	6.72"	1080 x 2400 (~392 ppi)	Yes	MediaTek Dimensity 6100+ 2x 2.2 GHz Cortex-A76 + 6x 2.0 GHz Cortex-A55	Mali-G57 MC2	6 GB; 8 GB (LPDDR4X)	128 GB; 256 GB (UFS 2.2)	13 MP + 2 MP, f/2.4 (depth)	8 MP, f/2.1	5000 mAh (Li-Po)	USB-C, 10 W	Android 13 (Realme UI 4.0)	Android 15 (Realme UI 6.0)
V50s	RMX3781	December 2023	IPS LCD, 120 Hz	6.72"	1080 x 2400 (~392 ppi)	Yes	MediaTek Dimensity 6100+ 2x 2.2 GHz Cortex-A76 + 6x 2.0 GHz Cortex-A55	Mali-G57 MC2	6 GB; 8 GB (LPDDR4X)	128 GB; 256 GB (UFS 2.2)	13 MP + 2 MP, f/2.4 (depth)	8 MP, f/2.1	5000 mAh (Li-Po)	USB-C, 10 W	Android 13 (Realme UI 4.0)	Android 15 (Realme UI 6.0)
V60 India: C63 5G	RMX3995	July 2024	IPS LCD, 120 Hz	6.67"	720 x 1600 (~264 ppi)	Yes	MediaTek Dimensity 6300 2x 2.4 GHz Cortex-A76 + 6x 2.0 GHz Cortex-A55	Mali-G57 MC2	6 GB; 8 GB (LPDDR4X)	128 GB; 256 GB (UFS 2.2)	32 MP, f/1.9 + Auxileary lens	8 MP, f/2.0	5000 mAh (Li-Po)	USB-C, 15 W	Android 14 (Realme UI 5.0)	Android 15 (Realme UI 6.0)
V60s India: C63 5G	RMX3996	July 2024	IPS LCD, 120 Hz	6.67"	720 x 1600 (~264 ppi)	Yes	MediaTek Dimensity 6300 2x 2.4 GHz Cortex-A76 + 6x 2.0 GHz Cortex-A55	Mali-G57 MC2	6 GB; 8 GB (LPDDR4X)	128 GB; 256 GB (UFS 2.2)	32 MP, f/1.9 + Auxileary lens	8 MP, f/2.0	5000 mAh (Li-Po)	USB-C, 15 W	Android 14 (Realme UI 5.0)	Android 15 (Realme UI 6.0)
V60 Pro	RMX3953	November 2024	IPS LCD, 120 Hz	6.67"	720 x 1600 (~264 ppi)	Yes	MediaTek Dimensity 6300 2x 2.4 GHz Cortex-A76 + 6x 2.0 GHz Cortex-A55	Mali-G57 MC2	12 GB (LPDDR4X)	256 GB; 512 GB (UFS 2.2)	50 MP, f/1.8 + Auxileary lens	8 MP	6000 mAh (Si/C Li-Ion)	USB-C, 45 W	Android 14 (Realme UI 5.0)	Android 15 (Realme UI 6.0)
V70 Global: Realme 14x	RMX3946	March 2025	IPS LCD, 120 Hz	6.67"	720 x 1604 (~264 ppi)	Yes	MediaTek Dimensity 6300 2x 2.4 GHz Cortex-A76 + 6x 2.0 GHz Cortex-A55	Mali-G57 MC2	6 GB; 8 GB (LPDDR4X)	128 GB; 256 GB (UFS 2.2)	50 MP, f/1.8 + Auxileary lens	8 MP	5000 mAh (Li-Po)	USB-C, 15 W	Android 15 (Realme UI 6.0)	
V70s Global: Realme 14x	RMX3948	March 2025	IPS LCD, 120 Hz	6.67"	720 x 1604 (~264 ppi)	Yes	MediaTek Dimensity 6300 2x 2.4 GHz Cortex-A76 + 6x 2.0 GHz Cortex-A55	Mali-G57 MC2	6 GB; 8 GB (LPDDR4X)	128 GB; 256 GB (UFS 2.2)	50 MP, f/1.8 + Auxileary lens	8 MP	5000 mAh (Li-Po)	USB-C, 15 W	Android 15 (Realme UI 6.0)	
Model	Model number	Release date	Display type	Display size	Display resolution	5G support	SoC	GPU	RAM	Internal Storage	Rear	Front	Battery	Charging	Initial	Latest
Model	Model number	Release date	Display type	Display size	Display resolution	5G support	SoC	GPU	RAM	Internal Storage	Camera		Battery	Charging	Operating system	

=== U Series ===
Model	Model number	Release date	Display type	Display size	Display resolution	5G support	SoC	GPU	RAM	Internal Storage	Camera		Battery	Charging	Operating system	
Model	Model number	Release date	Display type	Display size	Display resolution	5G support	SoC	GPU	RAM	Internal Storage	Rear	Front	Battery	Charging	Initial	Latest
U1	RMX1831; RMX1833	December 2018	IPS LCD Corning Gorilla Glass 3	6.3"	1080 x 2340 (~409 ppi)	No	MediaTek Helio P70 4x 2.1 GHz Cortex-A73 + 4x 2.0 GHz Cortex-A53	Mali-G72 MP3 @900 MHz	3 GB; 4 GB (LPDDR4X)	32 GB; 64 GB (eMMC 5.1)	13 MP, f/2.2 + 2 MP, f/2.4 (depth)	25 MP, f/2.0	3500 mAh (Li-Ion)	microUSB, 10 W	Android 8.1 (ColorOS 5.0)	Android 9 (ColorOS 6.0)

== Tablet computers ==
Model	Model number	Release date	Display type	Display size	Display resolution	Network support	SoC	GPU	RAM	Internal Storage	Camera		Battery	Charging	Operating system	
Model	Model number	Release date	Display type	Display size	Display resolution	Network support	SoC	GPU	RAM	Internal Storage	Rear	Front	Battery	Charging	Initial	Latest
Pad	RMP2102	September 2021	IPS LCD	10.4"	1200 x 2000 (~224 ppi)	No / Yes, LTE version	MediaTek Helio G80 2x 2.0 GHz Cortex-A75 + 6x 1.8 GHz Cortex-A55	Mali-G52 MC2 @950 MHz	3 GB; 4 GB; 6 GB (LPDDR4X)	32 GB; 64 GB; 128 GB	8 MP	8 MP (ultrawide)	7100 mAh (Li-Po)	USB-C, 18 W	Android 11	Android 11
Pad Mini		April 2022	IPS LCD	8.7"	800 x 1340 (~179 ppi)	No / Yes, LTE version	UNISOC Tiger T616 2x 2.0 GHz Cortex-A75 + 6x 1.8 GHz Cortex-A55	Mali-G57 MC1 @750 MHz	3 GB; 4 GB (LPDDR4X)	32 GB; 64 GB (UFS 2.1)	8 MP, f/2.0	5 MP, f/2.2	6400 mAh (Li-Po)	USB-C, 18 W	Android 11	Android 11
Pad X	RMP2107; RMP2108	June 2022	IPS LCD	10.95"	1200 x 2000 (~213 ppi)	No / Yes, 5G version	Qualcomm Snapdragon 695 4x 2.2 GHz Cortex-A78 + 4x 1.8 GHz Cortex-A55	Adreno 619	4 GB; 6 GB (LPDDR4X)	64 GB; 128 GB	13 MP, f/2.2	8 MP, f/2.0 (ultrawide)	8340 mAh (Li-Po)	USB-C, 33 W	Android 12	
Pad 2		July 2023	IPS LCD, 120 Hz	11.5"	1200 x 2000 (~203 ppi)	No / Yes, LTE version	MediaTek Helio G99 2x 2.2 GHz Cortex-A76 + 6x 2.0 GHz Cortex-A55	Mali-G57 MC2	6GB 8GB LPDDR4X	128GB 256GB	8MP, f2.0 (wide)	5MP, f2.2 (wide)	8360 mAh	USB-C, 33 W	Android 13	Android 14
Pad 2 Lite		September 2024	IPS LCD, 90 Hz	10.95"	1200 x 1920 (~207 ppi)	No / Yes, LTE version	MediaTek Helio G99 2x 2.2 GHz Cortex-A76 + 6x 2.0 GHz Cortex-A55	Mali-G57 MC2	4GB 8GB LPDDR4X	128GB	8MP, f2.0 (wide)	5MP, f2.2 (wide)	8300 mAh	USB-C, 15 W	Android 14	Android 14
Model	Model number	Release date	Display type	Display size	Display resolution	Network support	SoC	GPU	RAM	Internal Storage	Camera		Battery		Operating system	
Model	Model number	Release date	Display type	Display size	Display resolution	Network support	SoC	GPU	RAM	Internal Storage	Rear	Front	Battery		Initial	Latest

== TVs ==
=== Realme Smart TV Full HD (32") ===
Realme Smart TV Full HD 32-inch comes with an ultra-bright FHD display with an ultra-wide gamut of up to 85% NTSC. With bezels as thin as 8.7 mm, the Realme Smart TV Full HD promises an immersive viewing experience. For sound, the Realme Smart TV Full HD comes with 24 W Quad Stereo Speakers with Dolby Atmos support and is powered by a MediaTek 64-bit Quad-core Processor. The smart TV comes with an all-in-one smart remote, multiple connectivity support including multiple ports. The Realme Smart TV Full HD runs on Android 9 and it comes with Prime Video, Netflix, YouTube, Live TV and Google Play pre-loaded.

=== Realme Smart TV 4K (43'' & 50'') ===
The TV is quite simple, with slim borders, adding to its minimalistic look. The TV boasts of Dolby Vision HDR and Dolby Atmos sound — making it the key features of this device. It offers Ultra-HD (3840 x 2160 pixel) resolution and supports various HDR formats including HDR10 and HDR10+.

The Realme Smart TV 4K runs on Android TV 10 and offers a stock Android TV launcher. Some OTT apps are pre-installed, and others can be downloaded from the Google Play Store.

Powering the TV is a MediaTek quad-core processor.

=== Realme Smart TV SLED 4K (55") ===
The Realme Smart TV SLED offers Ultra-HD (3840 x 2160 pixel) resolution and supports various HDR formats including HDR10 and HDR10+ with a screen size of 55 inches.

It has 4 speakers of 6 W each, thus providing a total audio output of 24 W.
