= List of ARM processors =

This is a list of central processing units based on the ARM family of instruction sets designed by ARM Ltd. and third parties, sorted by version of the ARM instruction set, release and name. In 2005, ARM provided a summary of the numerous vendors who implement ARM cores in their design. Keil also provides a somewhat newer summary of vendors of ARM based processors. ARM further provides a chart displaying an overview of the ARM processor lineup with performance and functionality versus capabilities for the more recent ARM core families.

== Processors ==
=== Designed by ARM ===
Product family	ARM architecture	Processor	Feature	Cache (I / D), MMU	Typical MIPS @ MHz	Reference
ARM1	ARMv1	ARM1	First implementation	None		
ARM2	ARMv2	ARM2	ARMv2 added the MUL (multiply) instruction	None	0.33 DMIPS/MHz	
ARM2aS	ARMv2a	ARM250	Integrated MEMC (MMU), graphics and I/O processor. ARMv2a added the SWP and SWPB (swap) instructions	None, MEMC1a		
ARM2aS	ARMv2a	ARM3	First integrated memory cache	4 KB unified	0.50 DMIPS/MHz	
ARM6	ARMv3	ARM60	ARMv3 first to support 32-bit memory address space (previously 26-bit). ARMv3M first added long multiply instructions (32x32=64).	None	10 MIPS @ 12 MHz	
ARM6	ARMv3	ARM600	As ARM60, cache and coprocessor bus (for FPA10 floating-point unit)	4 KB unified	28 MIPS @ 33 MHz	
ARM6	ARMv3	ARM610	As ARM60, cache, no coprocessor bus	4 KB unified	17 MIPS @ 20 MHz; 0.65 DMIPS/MHz	
ARM7	ARMv3	ARM700	coprocessor bus (for FPA11 floating-point unit)	8 KB unified	40 MHz	
ARM7	ARMv3	ARM710	As ARM700, no coprocessor bus	8 KB unified	40 MHz	
ARM7	ARMv3	ARM710a	As ARM710, also used as core of ARM7100	8 KB unified	40 MHz; 0.68 DMIPS/MHz	
ARM7T	ARMv4T	ARM7TDMI(-S)	3-stage pipeline, Thumb, ARMv4 first to drop legacy ARM 26-bit addressing	None	15 MIPS @ 16.8 MHz; 63 DMIPS @ 70 MHz	
ARM7T	ARMv4T	ARM710T	As ARM7TDMI, cache	8 KB unified, MMU	36 MIPS @ 40 MHz	
ARM7T	ARMv4T	ARM720T	As ARM7TDMI, cache	8 KB unified, MMU with FCSE (Fast Context Switch Extension)	60 MIPS @ 59.8 MHz	
ARM7T	ARMv4T	ARM740T	As ARM7TDMI, cache	MPU		
ARM7EJ	ARMv5TEJ	ARM7EJ-S	5-stage pipeline, Thumb, Jazelle DBX, enhanced DSP instructions	None		
ARM8	ARMv4	ARM810	5-stage pipeline, static branch prediction, double-bandwidth memory	8 KB unified, MMU	84 MIPS @ 72 MHz; 1.16 DMIPS/MHz	
ARM9T	ARMv4T	ARM9TDMI	5-stage pipeline, Thumb	None		
ARM9T	ARMv4T	ARM920T	As ARM9TDMI, cache	16 KB / 16 KB, MMU with FCSE (Fast Context Switch Extension)	200 MIPS @ 180 MHz	
ARM9T	ARMv4T	ARM922T	As ARM9TDMI, caches	8 KB / 8 KB, MMU		
ARM9T	ARMv4T	ARM940T	As ARM9TDMI, caches	4 KB / 4 KB, MPU		
ARM9E	ARMv5TE	ARM946E-S	Thumb, enhanced DSP instructions, caches	Variable, tightly coupled memories, MPU		
ARM9E	ARMv5TE	ARM966E-S	Thumb, enhanced DSP instructions	No cache, TCMs		
ARM9E	ARMv5TE	ARM968E-S	As ARM966E-S	No cache, TCMs		
ARM9E	ARMv5TEJ	ARM926EJ-S	Thumb, Jazelle DBX, enhanced DSP instructions	Variable, TCMs, MMU	220 MIPS @ 200 MHz	
ARM9E	ARMv5TE	ARM996HS	Clockless processor, as ARM966E-S	No caches, TCMs, MPU		
ARM10E	ARMv5TE	ARM1020E	6-stage pipeline, Thumb, enhanced DSP instructions, (VFP)	32 KB / 32 KB, MMU		
ARM10E	ARMv5TE	ARM1022E	As ARM1020E	16 KB / 16 KB, MMU		
ARM10E	ARMv5TEJ	ARM1026EJ-S	Thumb, Jazelle DBX, enhanced DSP instructions, (VFP)	Variable, MMU or MPU		
ARM11	ARMv6	ARM1136J(F)-S	8-stage pipeline, SIMD, Thumb, Jazelle DBX, (VFP), enhanced DSP instructions, unaligned memory access	Variable, MMU	740 @ 532–665 MHz (i.MX31 SoC), 400–528 MHz	
ARM11	ARMv6T2	ARM1156T2(F)-S	9-stage pipeline, SIMD, Thumb-2, (VFP), enhanced DSP instructions	Variable, MPU		
ARM11	ARMv6Z	ARM1176JZ(F)-S	As ARM1136EJ(F)-S	Variable, MMU + TrustZone	965 DMIPS @ 772 MHz	
ARM11	ARMv6K	ARM11MPCore	As ARM1136EJ(F)-S, 1–4 core SMP	Variable, MMU		
SecurCore	ARMv6-M	SC000	As Cortex-M0		0.9 DMIPS/MHz	
SecurCore	ARMv4T	SC100	As ARM7TDMI			
SecurCore	ARMv7-M	SC300	As Cortex-M3		1.25 DMIPS/MHz	
Cortex-M	ARMv6-M	Cortex-M0	Microcontroller profile, most Thumb + some Thumb-2, hardware multiply instruction (optional small), optional system timer, optional bit-banding memory	Optional cache, no TCM, no MPU	0.84 DMIPS/MHz	
Cortex-M	ARMv6-M	Cortex-M0+	Microcontroller profile, most Thumb + some Thumb-2, hardware multiply instruction (optional small), optional system timer, optional bit-banding memory	Optional cache, no TCM, optional MPU with 8 regions	0.93 DMIPS/MHz	
Cortex-M	ARMv6-M	Cortex-M1	Microcontroller profile, most Thumb + some Thumb-2, hardware multiply instruction (optional small), OS option adds SVC / banked stack pointer, optional system timer, no bit-banding memory	Optional cache, 0–1024 KB I-TCM, 0–1024 KB D-TCM, no MPU	136 DMIPS @ 170 MHz, (0.8 DMIPS/MHz FPGA-dependent)	
Cortex-M	ARMv7-M	Cortex-M3	Microcontroller profile, Thumb / Thumb-2, hardware multiply and divide instructions, optional bit-banding memory	Optional cache, no TCM, optional MPU with 8 regions	1.25 DMIPS/MHz	
Cortex-M	ARMv7E-M	Cortex-M4	Microcontroller profile, Thumb / Thumb-2 / DSP / optional VFPv4-SP single-precision FPU, hardware multiply and divide instructions, optional bit-banding memory	Optional cache, no TCM, optional MPU with 8 regions	1.25 DMIPS/MHz (1.27 w/FPU)	
Cortex-M	ARMv7E-M	Cortex-M7	Microcontroller profile, Thumb / Thumb-2 / DSP / optional VFPv5 single and double precision FPU, hardware multiply and divide instructions	0−64 KB I-cache, 0−64 KB D-cache, 0–16 MB I-TCM, 0–16 MB D-TCM (all these w/optional ECC), optional MPU with 8 or 16 regions	2.14 DMIPS/MHz	
Cortex-M	ARMv8-M Baseline	Cortex-M23	Microcontroller profile, Thumb-1 (most), Thumb-2 (some), Divide, TrustZone	Optional cache, no TCM, optional MPU with 16 regions	1.03 DMIPS/MHz	
Cortex-M	ARMv8-M Mainline	Cortex-M33	Microcontroller profile, Thumb-1, Thumb-2, Saturated, DSP, Divide, FPU (SP), TrustZone, Co-processor	Optional cache, no TCM, optional MPU with 16 regions	1.50 DMIPS/MHz	
Cortex-M	ARMv8-M Mainline	Cortex-M35P	Microcontroller profile, Thumb-1, Thumb-2, Saturated, DSP, Divide, FPU (SP), TrustZone, Co-processor	Built-in cache (with option 2–16 KB), I-cache, no TCM, optional MPU with 16 regions	1.50 DMIPS/MHz	
Cortex-M	ARMv8.1-M Mainline	Cortex-M52			1.60 DMIPS/MHz	
Cortex-M	ARMv8.1-M Mainline	Cortex-M55			1.69 DMIPS/MHz	
Cortex-M	ARMv8.1-M Mainline	Cortex-M85			3.13 DMIPS/MHz	
Cortex-R	ARMv7-R	Cortex-R4	Real-time profile, Thumb / Thumb-2 / DSP / optional VFPv3 FPU, hardware multiply and optional divide instructions, optional parity & ECC for internal buses / cache / TCM, 8-stage pipeline dual-core running lockstep with fault logic	0–64 KB / 0–64 KB, 0–2 of 0–8 MB TCM, opt. MPU with 8/12 regions	1.67 DMIPS/MHz	
Cortex-R	ARMv7-R	Cortex-R5	Real-time profile, Thumb / Thumb-2 / DSP / optional VFPv3 FPU and precision, hardware multiply and optional divide instructions, optional parity & ECC for internal buses / cache / TCM, 8-stage pipeline dual-core running lock-step with fault logic / optional as 2 independent cores, low-latency peripheral port (LLPP), accelerator coherency port (ACP)	0–64 KB / 0–64 KB, 0–2 of 0–8 MB TCM, opt. MPU with 12/16 regions	1.67 DMIPS/MHz	
Cortex-R	ARMv7-R	Cortex-R7	Real-time profile, Thumb / Thumb-2 / DSP / optional VFPv3 FPU and precision, hardware multiply and optional divide instructions, optional parity & ECC for internal buses / cache / TCM, 11-stage pipeline dual-core running lock-step with fault logic / out-of-order execution / dynamic register renaming / optional as 2 independent cores, low-latency peripheral port (LLPP), ACP	0–64 KB / 0–64 KB, ? of 0–128 KB TCM, opt. MPU with 16 regions	2.50 DMIPS/MHz	
Cortex-R	ARMv7-R	Cortex-R8	TBD	0–64 KB / 0–64 KB L1, 0–1 / 0–1 MB TCM, opt MPU with 24 regions	2.50 DMIPS/MHz	
Cortex-R	ARMv8-R	Cortex-R52	TBD	0–32 KB / 0–32 KB L1, 0–1 / 0–1 MB TCM, opt MPU with 24+24 regions	2.09 DMIPS/MHz	
Cortex-R	ARMv8-R	Cortex-R52+	TBD	0–32 KB / 0–32 KB L1, 0–1 / 0–1 MB TCM, opt MPU with 24+24 regions	2.09 DMIPS/MHz	
Cortex-R	ARMv8-R	Cortex-R82	TBD	16–128 KB /16–64 KB L1, 64K–1MB L2, 0.16–1 / 0.16–1 MB TCM, opt MPU with 32+32 regions	3.41 DMIPS/MHz	
Cortex-A (32-bit)	ARMv7-A	Cortex-A5	Application profile, ARM / Thumb / Thumb-2 / DSP / SIMD / Optional VFPv4-D16 FPU / Optional NEON / Jazelle RCT and DBX, 1–4 cores / optional MPCore, snoop control unit (SCU), generic interrupt controller (GIC), accelerator coherence port (ACP)	4−64 KB / 4−64 KB L1, MMU + TrustZone	1.57 DMIPS/MHz per core	
Cortex-A (32-bit)	ARMv7-A	Cortex-A7	Application profile, ARM / Thumb / Thumb-2 / DSP / VFPv4 FPU / NEON / Jazelle RCT and DBX / Hardware virtualization, in-order execution, superscalar, 1–4 SMP cores, MPCore, Large Physical Address Extensions (LPAE), snoop control unit (SCU), generic interrupt controller (GIC), architecture and feature set are identical to A15, 8–10 stage pipeline, low-power design	8−64 KB / 8−64 KB L1, 0–1 MB L2, MMU + TrustZone	1.9 DMIPS/MHz per core	
Cortex-A (32-bit)	ARMv7-A	Cortex-A8	Application profile, ARM / Thumb / Thumb-2 / VFPv3 FPU / NEON / Jazelle RCT and DAC, 13-stage superscalar pipeline	16–32 KB / 16–32 KB L1, 0–1 MB L2 opt. ECC, MMU + TrustZone	2.0 DMIPS/MHz	
Cortex-A (32-bit)	ARMv7-A	Cortex-A9	Application profile, ARM / Thumb / Thumb-2 / DSP / Optional VFPv3 FPU / Optional NEON / Jazelle RCT and DBX, out-of-order speculative issue superscalar, 1–4 SMP cores, MPCore, snoop control unit (SCU), generic interrupt controller (GIC), accelerator coherence port (ACP)	16–64 KB / 16–64 KB L1, 0–8 MB L2 opt. parity, MMU + TrustZone	2.5 DMIPS/MHz per core, 10,000 DMIPS @ 2 GHz on Performance Optimized TSMC 40G (dual-core)	
Cortex-A (32-bit)	ARMv7-A	Cortex-A12	Application profile, ARM / Thumb-2 / DSP / VFPv4 FPU / NEON / Hardware virtualization, out-of-order speculative issue superscalar, 1–4 SMP cores, Large Physical Address Extensions (LPAE), snoop control unit (SCU), generic interrupt controller (GIC), accelerator coherence port (ACP)	32−64 KB	3.0 DMIPS/MHz per core	
Cortex-A (32-bit)	ARMv7-A	Cortex-A15	Application profile, ARM / Thumb / Thumb-2 / DSP / VFPv4 FPU / NEON / integer divide / fused MAC / Jazelle RCT / hardware virtualization, out-of-order speculative issue superscalar, 1–4 SMP cores, MPCore, Large Physical Address Extensions (LPAE), snoop control unit (SCU), generic interrupt controller (GIC), ACP, 15-24 stage pipeline	32 KB w/parity / 32 KB w/ECC L1, 0–4 MB L2, L2 has ECC, MMU + TrustZone	At least 3.5 DMIPS/MHz per core (up to 4.01 DMIPS/MHz depending on implementation)	
Cortex-A (32-bit)	ARMv7-A	Cortex-A17	Application profile, ARM / Thumb / Thumb-2 / DSP / VFPv4 FPU / NEON / integer divide / fused MAC / Jazelle RCT / hardware virtualization, out-of-order speculative issue superscalar, 1–4 SMP cores, MPCore, Large Physical Address Extensions (LPAE), snoop control unit (SCU), generic interrupt controller (GIC), ACP	32 KB L1, 256 KB–8 MB L2 w/optional ECC	2.8 DMIPS/MHz	
Cortex-A (32-bit)	ARMv8-A	Cortex-A32	Application profile, AArch32, 1–4 SMP cores, TrustZone, NEON advanced SIMD, VFPv4, hardware virtualization, dual issue, in-order pipeline	8–64 KB w/optional parity / 8−64 KB w/optional ECC L1 per core, 128 KB–1 MB L2 w/optional ECC shared		
Cortex-A (64-bit)	ARMv8-A	Cortex-A34	Application profile, AArch64, 1–4 SMP cores, TrustZone, NEON advanced SIMD, VFPv4, hardware virtualization, 2-width decode, in-order pipeline	8−64 KB w/parity / 8−64 KB w/ECC L1 per core, 128 KB–1 MB L2 shared, 40-bit physical addresses		
Cortex-A (64-bit)	ARMv8-A	Cortex-A35	Application profile, AArch32 and AArch64, 1–4 SMP cores, TrustZone, NEON advanced SIMD, VFPv4, hardware virtualization, 2-width decode, in-order pipeline	8−64 KB w/parity / 8−64 KB w/ECC L1 per core, 128 KB–1 MB L2 shared, 40-bit physical addresses	1.78 DMIPS/MHz	
Cortex-A (64-bit)	ARMv8-A	Cortex-A53	Application profile, AArch32 and AArch64, 1–4 SMP cores, TrustZone, NEON advanced SIMD, VFPv4, hardware virtualization, 2-width decode, in-order pipeline	8−64 KB w/parity / 8−64 KB w/ECC L1 per core, 128 KB–2 MB L2 shared, 40-bit physical addresses	2.3 DMIPS/MHz	
Cortex-A (64-bit)	ARMv8-A	Cortex-A57	Application profile, AArch32 and AArch64, 1–4 SMP cores, TrustZone, NEON advanced SIMD, VFPv4, hardware virtualization, 3-width decode superscalar, deeply out-of-order pipeline	48 KB w/DED parity / 32 KB w/ECC L1 per core; 512 KB–2 MB L2 shared w/ECC; 44-bit physical addresses	4.1–4.8 DMIPS/MHz	
Cortex-A (64-bit)	ARMv8-A	Cortex-A72	Application profile, AArch32 and AArch64, 1–4 SMP cores, TrustZone, NEON advanced SIMD, VFPv4, hardware virtualization, 3-width superscalar, deeply out-of-order pipeline	48 KB w/DED parity / 32 KB w/ECC L1 per core; 512 KB–2 MB L2 shared w/ECC; 44-bit physical addresses	6.3-7.3 DMIPS/MHz	
Cortex-A (64-bit)	ARMv8-A	Cortex-A73	Application profile, AArch32 and AArch64, 1–4 SMP cores, TrustZone, NEON advanced SIMD, VFPv4, hardware virtualization, 2-width superscalar, deeply out-of-order pipeline	64 KB / 32−64 KB L1 per core, 256 KB–8 MB L2 shared w/ optional ECC, 44-bit physical addresses	7.4-8.5 DMIPS/MHz	
Cortex-A (64-bit)	ARMv8.2-A	Cortex-A55	Application profile, AArch32 and AArch64, 1–8 SMP cores, TrustZone, NEON advanced SIMD, VFPv4, hardware virtualization, 2-width decode, in-order pipeline	16−64 KB / 16−64 KB L1, 256 KB L2 per core, 4 MB L3 shared	3 DMIPS/MHz	
Cortex-A (64-bit)	ARMv8.2-A	Cortex-A65	Application profile, AArch64, 1–8 SMP cores, TrustZone, NEON advanced SIMD, VFPv4, hardware virtualization, 2-wide decode superscalar, 3-width issue, out-of-order pipeline, SMT			
Cortex-A (64-bit)	ARMv8.2-A	Cortex-A65AE	As ARM Cortex-A65, adds dual core lockstep for safety applications	64 / 64 KB L1, 256 KB L2 per core, 4 MB L3 shared		
Cortex-A (64-bit)	ARMv8.2-A	Cortex-A75	Application profile, AArch32 and AArch64, 1–8 SMP cores, TrustZone, NEON advanced SIMD, VFPv4, hardware virtualization, 3-width decode superscalar, deeply out-of-order pipeline	64 / 64 KB L1, 512 KB L2 per core, 4 MB L3 shared	8.2-9.5 DMIPS/MHz	
Cortex-A (64-bit)	ARMv8.2-A	Cortex-A76	Application profile, AArch32 (non-privileged level or EL0 only) and AArch64, 1–4 SMP cores, TrustZone, NEON advanced SIMD, VFPv4, hardware virtualization, 4-width decode superscalar, 8-way issue, 13 stage pipeline, deeply out-of-order pipeline	64 / 64 KB L1, 256−512 KB L2 per core, 512 KB−4 MB L3 shared	10.7-12.4 DMIPS/MHz	
Cortex-A (64-bit)	ARMv8.2-A	Cortex-A76AE	As ARM Cortex-A76, adds dual core lockstep for safety applications			
Cortex-A (64-bit)	ARMv8.2-A	Cortex-A77	Application profile, AArch32 (non-privileged level or EL0 only) and AArch64, 1–4 SMP cores, TrustZone, NEON advanced SIMD, VFPv4, hardware virtualization, 4-width decode superscalar, 6-width instruction fetch, 12-way issue, 13 stage pipeline, deeply out-of-order pipeline	1.5K L0 MOPs cache, 64 / 64 KB L1, 256−512 KB L2 per core, 512 KB−4 MB L3 shared	13-16 DMIPS/MHz	
Cortex-A (64-bit)	ARMv8.2-A	Cortex-A78				
Cortex-A (64-bit)	ARMv8.2-A	Cortex-A78AE	As ARM Cortex-A78, adds dual core lockstep for safety applications			
Cortex-A (64-bit)	ARMv8.2-A	Cortex-A78C				
Cortex-A (64-bit)	ARMv9-A	Cortex-A510				
Cortex-A (64-bit)	ARMv9-A	Cortex-A710				
Cortex-A (64-bit)	ARMv9-A	Cortex-A715				
Cortex-A (64-bit)	ARMv9.2-A	Cortex-A320				
Cortex-A (64-bit)	ARMv9.2-A	Cortex-A520				
Cortex-A (64-bit)	ARMv9.2-A	Cortex-A720				
Cortex-A (64-bit)	ARMv9.2-A	Cortex-A725				
Cortex-X	ARMv8.2-A	Cortex-X1	Performance-tuned variant of Cortex-A78			
Cortex-X	ARMv9-A	Cortex-X2		64 / 64 KB L1, 512–1024 KiB L2 per core, 512 KiB–8 MiB L3 shared		
Cortex-X	ARMv9-A	Cortex-X3		64 / 64 KB L1, 512–2048 KiB L2 per core, 512 KiB–16 MiB L3 shared		
Cortex-X	ARMv9.2-A	Cortex-X4		64 / 64 KB L1, 512–2048 KiB L2 per core, 512 KiB–32 MiB L3 shared		
Cortex-X	ARMv9.2-A	Cortex-X925		64 / 64 KB L1, 2048–3072 KiB L2 per core, 512 KiB–32 MiB L3 shared		
Neoverse	ARMv8.2-A	Neoverse N1	Application profile, AArch32 (non-privileged level or EL0 only) and AArch64, 1–4 SMP cores, TrustZone, NEON advanced SIMD, VFPv4, hardware virtualization, 4-width decode superscalar, 8-way dispatch/issue, 13 stage pipeline, deeply out-of-order pipeline	64 / 64 KB L1, 512−1024 KB L2 per core, 2−128 MB L3 shared, 128 MB system level cache		
Neoverse	ARMv8.2-A	Neoverse E1	Application profile, AArch64, 1–8 SMP cores, TrustZone, NEON advanced SIMD, VFPv4, hardware virtualization, 2-wide decode superscalar, 3-width issue, 10 stage pipeline, out-of-order pipeline, SMT	32−64 KB / 32−64 KB L1, 256 KB L2 per core, 4 MB L3 shared		
Neoverse	ARMv8.4-A	Neoverse V1				
Neoverse	ARMv9-A	Neoverse N2				
Neoverse	ARMv9-A	Neoverse V2				
Neoverse	ARMv9.2-A	Neoverse N3				
Neoverse	ARMv9.2-A	Neoverse V3				
C1	ARMv9.3-A	C1-Ultra	Successor to Cortex X925 Native SME2 instruction set support introduced	64 / 128 KB L1, 2048–3072 KiB L2 per core, 256 KiB–32 MiB L3 shared, 40-bit MMU, SVE2 + SME2		
C1	ARMv9.3-A	C1-Premium	New tier	64 / 128 KB L1, 512–1024 KiB L2 per core, 256 KiB–32 MiB L3 shared, 40-bit MMU, SVE2 + SME2		
C1	ARMv9.3-A	C1-Pro	Successor to Cortex A725 Native SME2 instruction set support introduced	64 / 64 KB L1, 128–1024 KiB L2 per core, 256 KiB–32 MiB L3 shared, 40-bit MMU, SVE2 + SME2		
C1	ARMv9.3-A	C1-Nano	Successor to Cortex A520 Native SME2 instruction set support introduced	32/64 / 64 KB L1, 128–512 KiB L2 per core, 256 KiB–32 MiB L3 shared, 40-bit MMU, SVE2 + SME2		
ARM family	ARM architecture	ARM core	Feature	Cache (I / D), MMU	Typical MIPS @ MHz	Reference

=== Designed by third parties ===
These cores implement the ARM instruction set, and were developed independently by companies with an architectural license from ARM.

Product family	ARM architecture	Processor	Feature	Cache (I / D), MMU	Typical MIPS @ MHz
StrongARM (Digital)	ARMv4	SA-110	5-stage pipeline	16 KB / 16 KB, MMU	100–233 MHz; 1.0 DMIPS/MHz
StrongARM (Digital)	ARMv4	SA-1100	derivative of the SA-110	16 KB / 8 KB, MMU	
Faraday (Faraday Technology)	ARMv4	FA510	6-stage pipeline	Up to 32 KB / 32 KB cache, MPU	1.26 DMIPS/MHz; 100–200 MHz
Faraday (Faraday Technology)	ARMv4	FA526	6-stage pipeline	Up to 32 KB / 32 KB cache, MMU	1.26 MIPS/MHz; 166–300 MHz
Faraday (Faraday Technology)	ARMv4	FA626	8-stage pipeline	32 KB / 32 KB cache, MMU	1.35 DMIPS/MHz; 500 MHz
Faraday (Faraday Technology)	ARMv5TE	FA606TE	5-stage pipeline	No cache, no MMU	1.22 DMIPS/MHz; 200 MHz
Faraday (Faraday Technology)	ARMv5TE	FA626TE	8-stage pipeline	32 KB / 32 KB cache, MMU	1.43 MIPS/MHz; 800 MHz
Faraday (Faraday Technology)	ARMv5TE	FMP626TE	8-stage pipeline, SMP	32 KB / 32 KB cache, MMU	1.43 MIPS/MHz; 500 MHz
Faraday (Faraday Technology)	ARMv5TE	FA726TE	13 stage pipeline, dual issue	32 KB / 32 KB cache, MMU	2.4 DMIPS/MHz; 1000 MHz
XScale (Intel / Marvell)	ARMv5TE	XScale	7-stage pipeline, Thumb, enhanced DSP instructions	32 KB / 32 KB, MMU	133–400 MHz
XScale (Intel / Marvell)	ARMv5TE	Bulverde	Wireless MMX, wireless SpeedStep added	32 KB / 32 KB, MMU	312–624 MHz
XScale (Intel / Marvell)	ARMv5TE	Monahans	Wireless MMX2 added	32 KB / 32 KB L1, optional L2 cache up to 512 KB, MMU	Up to 1.25 GHz
Sheeva (Marvell)	ARMv5	Feroceon	5–8 stage pipeline, single-issue	16 KB / 16 KB, MMU	600–2000 MHz
Sheeva (Marvell)	ARMv5	Jolteon	5–8 stage pipeline, dual-issue	32 KB / 32 KB, MMU	600–2000 MHz
Sheeva (Marvell)	ARMv5	PJ1 (Mohawk)	5–8 stage pipeline, single-issue, Wireless MMX2	32 KB / 32 KB, MMU	1.46 DMIPS/MHz; 1.06 GHz
Sheeva (Marvell)	ARMv6 / ARMv7-A	PJ4	6–9 stage pipeline, dual-issue, Wireless MMX2, SMP	32 KB / 32 KB, MMU	2.41 DMIPS/MHz; 1.6 GHz
Snapdragon (Qualcomm)	ARMv7-A	Scorpion	1 or 2 cores. ARM / Thumb / Thumb-2 / DSP / SIMD / VFPv3 FPU / NEON (128-bit wide)	256 KB L2 per core	2.1 DMIPS/MHz per core
Snapdragon (Qualcomm)	ARMv7-A	Krait	1, 2, or 4 cores. ARM / Thumb / Thumb-2 / DSP / SIMD / VFPv4 FPU / NEON (128-bit wide)	4 KB / 4 KB L0, 16 KB / 16 KB L1, 512 KB L2 per core	3.3 DMIPS/MHz per core
Snapdragon (Qualcomm)	ARMv8-A	Kryo	4 cores.	?	Up to 2.2 GHz (6.3 DMIPS/MHz)
A series (Apple)	ARMv7-A	Swift	2 cores. ARM / Thumb / Thumb-2 / DSP / SIMD / VFPv4 FPU / NEON	L1: 32 KB / 32 KB, L2: 1 MB shared	3.5 DMIPS/MHz per core
A series (Apple)	ARMv8-A	Cyclone	2 cores. ARM / Thumb / Thumb-2 / DSP / SIMD / VFPv4 FPU / NEON / TrustZone / AArch64. Out-of-order, superscalar.	L1: 64 KB / 64 KB, L2: 1 MB shared SLC: 4 MB	1.3 or 1.4 GHz
A series (Apple)	ARMv8-A	Typhoon	2 or 3 cores. ARM / Thumb / Thumb-2 / DSP / SIMD / VFPv4 FPU / NEON / TrustZone / AArch64	L1: 64 KB / 64 KB, L2: 1 MB or 2 MB shared SLC: 4 MB	1.4 or 1.5 GHz
A series (Apple)	ARMv8-A	Twister	2 cores. ARM / Thumb / Thumb-2 / DSP / SIMD / VFPv4 FPU / NEON / TrustZone / AArch64	L1: 64 KB / 64 KB, L2: 2 MB shared SLC: 4 MB or 0 MB	1.85 or 2.26 GHz
A series (Apple)	ARMv8-A	Hurricane and Zephyr	Hurricane: 2 or 3 cores. AArch64, out-of-order, superscalar, 6-decode, 6-issue, 9-wide Zephyr: 2 or 3 cores. AArch64, out-of-order, superscalar.	L1: 64 KB / 64 KB, L2: 3 MB or 8 MB shared L1: 32 KB / 32 KB. L2: none SLC: 4 MB or 0 MB	2.34 or 2.38 GHz; 1.05 GHz
A series (Apple)	ARMv8.2-A	Monsoon and Mistral	Monsoon: 2 cores. AArch64, out-of-order, superscalar, 7-decode, ?-issue, 11-wide Mistral: 4 cores. AArch64, out-of-order, superscalar. Based on Swift.	L1I: 128 KB, L1D: 64 KB, L2: 8 MB shared L1: 32 KB / 32 KB, L2: 1 MB shared SLC: 4 MB	2.39 GHz; 1.70 GHz
A series (Apple)	ARMv8.3-A	Vortex and Tempest	Vortex: 2 or 4 cores. AArch64, out-of-order, superscalar, 7-decode, ?-issue, 11-wide Tempest: 4 cores. AArch64, out-of-order, superscalar, 3-decode. Based on Swift.	L1: 128 KB / 128 KB, L2: 8 MB shared L1: 32 KB / 32 KB, L2: 2 MB shared SLC: 8 MB	2.49 GHz; 1.59 GHz
A series (Apple)	ARMv8.4-A	Lightning and Thunder	Lightning: 2 cores. AArch64, out-of-order, superscalar, 7-decode, ?-issue, 11-wide Thunder: 4 cores. AArch64, out-of-order, superscalar.	L1: 128 KB / 128 KB, L2: 8 MB shared L1: 32 KB / 48 KB, L2: 4 MB shared SLC: 16 MB	2.66 GHz; 1.73 GHz
A series (Apple)	ARMv8.5-A	Firestorm and Icestorm	Firestorm: 2 cores. AArch64, out-of-order, superscalar, 8-decode, ?-issue, 14-wide Icestorm: 4 cores. AArch64, out-of-order, superscalar, 4-decode, ?-issue, 7-wide.	L1: 192 KB / 128 KB, L2: 8 MB shared L1: 128 KB / 64 KB, L2: 4 MB shared SLC: 16 MB	3.0 GHz; 1.82 GHz
A series (Apple)	ARMv8.6-A	Avalanche and Blizzard	Avalanche: 2 cores. AArch64, out-of-order, superscalar, 8-decode, ?-issue, 14-wide Blizzard: 4 cores. AArch64, out-of-order, superscalar, 4-decode, ?-issue, 8-wide.	L1: 192 KB / 128 KB, L2: 12 MB shared L1: 128 KB / 64 KB, L2: 4 MB shared SLC: 32 MB	2.93 or 3.23 GHz; 2.02 GHz
A series (Apple)	ARMv8.6-A	Everest and Sawtooth	Everest: 2 cores. AArch64, out-of-order, superscalar, 8-decode, ?-issue, 14-wide Sawtooth: 4 cores. AArch64, out-of-order, superscalar, 4-decode, ?-issue, 8-wide.	L1: 192 KB / 128 KB, L2: 16 MB shared L1: 128 KB / 64 KB, L2: 4 MB shared SLC: 24 MB	3.46 GHz; 2.02 GHz
A series (Apple)	ARMv8.6-A	Apple A17 Pro	Apple A17 Pro (P-cores): 2 cores. AArch64, out-of-order, superscalar, 8-decode, ?-issue, 14-wide Apple A17 Pro (E-cores): 4 cores. AArch64, out-of-order, superscalar, 4-decode, ?-issue, 8-wide.	L1: 192 KB / 128 KB, L2: 16 MB shared L1: 128 KB / 64 KB, L2: 4 MB shared SLC: 24 MB	3.78 GHz; 2.11 GHz
M series (Apple)	ARMv8.5-A	Firestorm and Icestorm	Firestorm: 4, 6, 8 or 16 cores. AArch64, out-of-order, superscalar, 8-decode, 8-issue, 14-wide Icestorm: 2 or 4 cores. AArch64, out-of-order, superscalar, 4-decode, 4-issue, 7-wide.	L1: 192 KB / 128 KB, L2: 12, 24 or 48 MB shared L1: 128 KB / 64 KB, L2: 4 or 8 MB shared SLC: 8, 24, 48 or 96 MB	3.2-3.23 GHz; 2.06 GHz
M series (Apple)	ARMv8.6-A	Avalanche and Blizzard	Avalanche: 4, 6, 8 or 16 cores. AArch64, out-of-order, superscalar, 8-decode, 8-issue, 14-wide Blizzard: 4 or 8 cores. AArch64, out-of-order, superscalar, 4-decode, 4-issue, 8-wide.	L1: 192 KB / 128 KB, L2: 16, 32 or 64 MB shared L1: 128 KB / 64 KB, L2: 4 or 8 MB shared SLC: 8, 24, 48 or 96 MB	3.49 GHz; 2.42 GHz
M series (Apple)	ARMv8.6-A	Apple M3	Apple M3 (P-cores): 4, 5, 6, 10, 12 or 16 cores. AArch64, out-of-order, superscalar, 9-decode, 9-issue, 14-wide Apple M3 (E-cores): 4 or 6 cores. AArch64, out-of-order, superscalar, 5-decode, 5-issue, 8-wide.	L1: 192 KB / 128 KB, L2: 16, 32 or 64 MB shared L1: 128 KB / 64 KB, L2: 4 or 8 MB shared SLC: 8, 24, 48 or 96 MB	4.05 GHz; 2.75 GHz
M series (Apple)	ARMv9.2-A	Apple M4	Apple M4 (P-cores): 3 or 4 cores. AArch64, out-of-order, superscalar, 10-decode, 10-issue, 16-wide Apple M4 (E-cores): 6 cores. AArch64, out-of-order, superscalar, 5-decode, 5-issue, 8-wide.	L1: 192 KB / 128 KB, L2: 16, 32 or 64 MB shared L1: 128 KB / 64 KB, L2: 4 or 8 MB shared SLC: 8, 24, 48 or 96 MB	4.40 GHz; 2.85 GHz
X-Gene (Applied Micro)	ARMv8-A	X-Gene	64-bit, quad issue, SMP, 64 cores	Cache, MMU, virtualization	3 GHz (4.2 DMIPS/MHz per core)
Denver (Nvidia)	ARMv8-A	Denver	2 cores. AArch64, 7-wide superscalar, in-order, dynamic code optimization, 128 MB optimization cache, Denver1: 28 nm, Denver2:16 nm	128 KB I-cache / 64 KB D-cache	Up to 2.5 GHz
Carmel (Nvidia)	ARMv8.2-A	Carmel	2 cores. AArch64, 10-wide superscalar, in-order, dynamic code optimization, ? MB optimization cache, functional safety, dual execution, parity & ECC	? KB I-cache / ? KB D-cache	Up to ? GHz
ThunderX (Cavium)	ARMv8-A	ThunderX	64-bit, with two models with 8–16 or 24–48 cores (×2 w/two chips)	?	Up to 2.2 GHz
K12 (AMD)	ARMv8-A	K12	?	?	?
Exynos (Samsung)	ARMv8-A	M1 ("Mongoose")	4 cores. AArch64, 4-wide, quad-issue, superscalar, out-of-order	64 KB I-cache / 32 KB D-cache, L2: 16-way shared 2 MB	5.1 DMIPS/MHz (2.6 GHz)
Exynos (Samsung)	ARMv8-A	M2 ("Mongoose")	4 cores. AArch64, 4-wide, quad-issue, superscalar, out-of-order	64 KB I-cache / 32 KB D-cache, L2: 16-way shared 2 MB	2.3 GHz
Exynos (Samsung)	ARMv8-A	M3 ("Meerkat")	4 cores, AArch64, 6-decode, 6-issue, 6-wide. superscalar, out-of-order	64 KB I-cache / 64 KB D-cache, L2: 8-way private 512 KB, L3: 16-way shared 4 MB	2.7 GHz
Exynos (Samsung)	ARMv8.2-A	M4 ("Cheetah")	2 cores, AArch64, 6-decode, 6-issue, 6-wide. superscalar, out-of-order	64 KB I-cache / 64 KB D-cache, L2: 8-way private 1 MB, L3: 16-way shared 3 MB	2.73 GHz
Exynos (Samsung)	ARMv8.2-A	M5 ("Lion")	2 cores, AArch64, 6-decode, 6-issue, 6-wide. superscalar, out-of-order	64 KB I-cache / 64 KB D-cache, L2: 8-way shared 2 MB, L3: 12-way shared 3 MB	2.73 GHz

== Timeline ==
The following table lists each core by the year it was announced.

=== ARM Classic ===
Year	Classic cores						
Year	ARM1-3	ARM6	ARM7	ARM8	ARM9	ARM10	ARM11
1985	ARM1						
1986	ARM2						
1989	ARM3						
1992	ARM250						
1993		ARM60; ARM610	ARM700				
1994			ARM710; ARM7DI; ARM7TDMI				
1995			ARM710a				
1996				ARM810			
1997			ARM710T; ARM720T; ARM740T				
1998					ARM9TDMI; ARM940T		
1999					ARM9E-S; ARM966E-S		
2000					ARM920T; ARM922T; ARM946E-S	ARM1020T	
2001			ARM7EJ-S; ARM7TDMI-S		ARM9EJ-S; ARM926EJ-S	ARM1020E; ARM1022E	
2002						ARM1026EJ-S	ARM1136J(F)-S
2003					ARM968E-S		ARM1156T2(F)-S; ARM1176JZ(F)-S
2004							
2005							ARM11MPCore
2006					ARM996HS		

=== ARM Cortex / Neoverse ===
Year	Cortex cores					Neoverse cores
Year	Microcontroller (Cortex-M)	Real-time (Cortex-R)	Application (Cortex-A) (32-bit)	Application (Cortex-A) (64-bit)	Application (Cortex-X) (64-bit)	Application (Neoverse) (64-bit)
2004	Cortex-M3					
2005			Cortex-A8			
2006						
2007	Cortex-M1		Cortex-A9			
2008						
2009	Cortex-M0		Cortex-A5			
2010	Cortex-M4(F)		Cortex-A15			
2011		Cortex-R4(F); Cortex-R5(F); Cortex-R7(F)	Cortex-A7			
2012	Cortex-M0+			Cortex-A53; Cortex-A57		
2013			Cortex-A12			
2014	Cortex-M7(F)		Cortex-A17			
2015				Cortex-A35; Cortex-A72		
2016	Cortex-M23; Cortex-M33(F)	Cortex-R8(F); Cortex-R52(F)	Cortex-A32	Cortex-A73		
2017				Cortex-A55; Cortex-A75		
2018	Cortex-M35P(F)			Cortex-A65; Cortex-A65AE; Cortex-A76; Cortex-A76AE		
2019			Cortex-A34	Cortex-A77		Neoverse E1; Neoverse N1
2020	Cortex-M55(F)	Cortex-R82(F)		Cortex-A78; Cortex-A78AE; Cortex-A78C	Cortex-X1	Neoverse V1
2021				Cortex-A510; Cortex-A710	Cortex-X2	Neoverse E2; Neoverse N2
2022	Cortex-M85(F)	Cortex-R52+(F)		Cortex-A715	Cortex-X3	Neoverse V2
2023	Cortex-M52(F)			Cortex-A520; Cortex-A720	Cortex-X4	Neoverse E3; Neoverse N3
2024		Cortex-R82AE		Cortex-A520AE; Cortex-A720AE; Cortex-A725	Cortex-X925	Neoverse V3; Neoverse V3AE; Neoverse VN
2025				Cortex-A320; Cortex-A530; Cortex-A730	Cortex-X930	Neoverse E4; Neoverse N4; Neoverse V4

== See also ==
- AArch64
- Comparison of ARM processors
- List of products using ARM processors
