= ARM Cortex-X4 =

High-performance CPU core design

General information
- Launched: 2023
- Designed by: ARM Ltd.

Performance
- Address width: 40-bit

Physical specifications
- Cores: 1–10 (per cluster)

Cache
- L1 cache: 128 KiB (64 KiB I-cache with parity, 64 KiB D-cache) per core
- L2 cache: 512–2048 KiB per core
- L3 cache: 512 KiB – 32 MiB (optional)

Architecture and classification
- Microarchitecture: ARM Cortex-X4
- Instruction set: ARMv9.2-A

Products, models, variants
- Product code name: "Hunter ELP"
- Variant: ARM Cortex-A720

History
- Predecessor: ARM Cortex-X3
- Successor: ARM Cortex-X925

The ARM Cortex-X4 is a high-performance CPU core from Arm, released in 2023 as part of Arm's "total compute solution". It serves as the successor of ARM Cortex-X3.

X-series CPU cores generally focus on high performance, and can be grouped with other ARM cores, such as ARM Cortex-A720 or/and ARM Cortex-A520 in a System-on-Chip (SoC).

== Architecture changes in comparison with ARM Cortex-X3 ==
The processor implements the following changes:

- ARMv9.2
- micro-op (MOP) cache removed (previously 1.5k entries)
- Decode width: 10
- Rename / Dispatch width: 10 (increased from 8)
- Reorder buffer (ROB): 384 entries (increased from 320)
- Execution ports: 21 (increased from 15)
- Pipeline length: 10 (increased from 9)
- Up to 2 MiB of private L2 cache (increased from 1 MiB)
- DSU-120
  - Up to 14 cores (up from 12 cores)
  - Up to 32 MiB of shared L3 cache (increased from 16 MiB)

Performance claims:

- 15% peak performance improvement over the Cortex-X3 in smartphones (3.4GHz, 2MB L2, 8MB L3).
- 13% IPC uplift over the Cortex-X3, when based on the same process, clock speed, and L3 cache (but 2 MiB L2 vs 1 MiB L2) setup (also known as ISO-process).

== Architecture comparison ==
"Prime" core

uArch	Cortex-A78	Cortex-X1	Cortex-X2	Cortex-X3	Cortex-X4	Cortex-X925
Code name	Hercules	Hera	Matterhorn-ELP	Makalu-ELP	Hunter-ELP	Blackhawk
Architecture	ARMv8.2		ARMv9		ARMv9.2	
Peak clock speed	~3.0 GHz			~3.3 GHz	~3.4 GHz	~3.8 GHz
Decode width	4	5		6	10	
Dispatch	6/cycle	8/cycle			10/cycle	
Max in-flight	2x 160	2x 224	2x 288	2x 320	2x 384	2x 768
L0 (Mops entries)	1536	3072		1536	0	
L1-I + L1-D	32+32 KiB	64+64 KiB				
L2	128–512 KiB	0.25–1 MiB			0.5–2 MiB	2–3 MiB
L3	0–8 MiB		0–16 MiB		0–32 MiB	

== Usage ==
- Google • Tensor G4
- MediaTek • Dimensity 9300/9300+
- Qualcomm • Snapdragon 8 Gen 3 (2023)

== See also ==
- ARM Cortex-A520, related high efficient microarchitecture
- ARM Cortex-A720, related efficient sustained performance microarchitecture
- Comparison of ARMv8-A cores
