= ARM Cortex-X925 =

High-performance CPU core design

General information
- Launched: 2024
- Designed by: ARM Ltd.

Performance
- Address width: 40-bit

Physical specifications
- Cores: 1–14 per cluster

Cache
- L1 cache: 128 KiB (64 KiB I-cache with parity, 64 KiB D-cache) per core
- L2 cache: 2048–3072 KiB per core
- L3 cache: 512 KiB – 32 MiB (optional)

Architecture and classification
- Microarchitecture: ARM Cortex-X925
- Instruction set: ARMv9.2-A

Products, models, variants
- Product code name: Blackhawk
- Variant: ARM Cortex-A725

History
- Predecessor: ARM Cortex-X4
- Successor: ARM C1-Ultra

The ARM Cortex-X925, codenamed "Blackhawk", is a high-performance CPU core designed by Arm and introduced in 2024. It is part of the second-generation ARMv9.2 architecture and is built on a 3 nm process node. The Cortex-X925 is designed to excel in single-threaded instruction per clock (IPC) performance, making it ideal for high-performance mobile computing. ARM states that at ISO-frequency, the Cortex-X925 delivers around 17% higher IPC than the preceding Cortex-X4.

== Key features ==
- 10-wide decode and dispatch width: This allows the core to process more instructions per cycle, increasing overall throughput.
- Doubled instruction window size: This reduces stalls and improves the efficiency of the execution pipeline.
- Increased L1 instruction cache (I$) bandwidth: The core features a 2x increase in L1 I$ bandwidth, ensuring quick instruction fetch and decode.
- Enhanced branch prediction unit: Techniques such as folded-out unconditional direct branches reduce mispredicted branches, leading to fewer pipeline flushes and higher sustained IPC.
- Support for ARMv9.2-A instruction set: The core supports A64 instruction set and AArch64 execution state at all exception levels.
- Scalable Vector Extension (SVE) and SVE2: These extensions provide advanced SIMD and floating-point support.
- Error protection: The core includes error protection on L1 instruction and data caches, L2 cache, and MMU Translation Cache (MMU TC) with parity or ECC.

The Cortex-X925 is designed to be used in both homogeneous and heterogeneous DynamIQ™ clusters, providing flexibility in various system configurations.

Released in 2024 as part of Arm's "total compute solution." It serves as the successor of ARM Cortex-X4. X-series CPU cores generally focus on high performance, and can be grouped with other ARM cores, such as ARM Cortex-A725 and/or ARM Cortex-A520 in a System-on-Chip (SoC).

== Architecture comparison ==
uArch	Cortex-A78	Cortex-X1	Cortex-X2	Cortex-X3	Cortex-X4	Cortex-X925
Code name	Hercules	Hera	Matterhorn-ELP	Makalu-ELP	Hunter-ELP	Blackhawk
Architecture	ARMv8.2		ARMv9		ARMv9.2	
Peak clock speed	~3.0 GHz			~3.25 GHz	~3.4 GHz	~3.8 GHz
Decode Width	4	5		6	10	
Dispatch	6/cycle	8/cycle			10/cycle	
Max In-flight	2× 160	2× 224	2× 288	2× 320	2× 384	2× 768
L0 (Mops entries)	1536	3072		1536	None	
L1-I + L1-D	32+32 kiB	64+64 kiB				
L2 (per Core)	128–512 kiB	256–1024 kiB			512–2048 kiB	2048–3072 kiB
L3 (total)	0–8 MiB		0–16 MiB		0–32 MiB	

== Usage ==
- MediaTek • Dimensity 9400/9400+
- Samsung • Exynos 2500
- Nvidia • GB10 Superchip
- Xiaomi Xring O1
