= Kryo =

Custom or semi-custom ARM-based CPU series

Qualcomm Kryo is a series of custom or semi-custom ARM-based CPUs included in the Snapdragon line of SoCs.

These CPUs implement the ARM 64-bit instruction set and serve as the successor to the previous 32-bit Krait CPUs. It was first introduced in the Snapdragon 820 (2015). In 2017 Qualcomm released the Snapdragon 636 and Snapdragon 660, the first mid-range Kryo SoCs. In 2018 the first entry-level SoC with Kryo architecture, the Snapdragon 632, was released.

== Kryo (original) ==
First announced in September 2015 and used in the Snapdragon 820 SoC. The original Kryo cores can be used in both parts of the big.LITTLE configuration, where two dual-core clusters (in the case of Snapdragon 820 and 821) run at different clock frequency, similar to how both Cortex-A53 clusters work in the Snapdragon 615.

The Kryo in the 820/821 is an in-house custom ARMv8.0-A (AArch64/AArch32) design and not based on an ARM Cortex design.

- 820: 2x Kryo Performance @ 2.15 GHz + 2x Kryo Efficiency @ 1.59 GHz
- 821: 2x Kryo Performance @ 2.34 GHz + 2x Kryo Efficiency @ 2.19 GHz
- 32 KB L1i + 32 KB L1d cache
- 1 MB L2 cache (Performance cluster) and 512 KB L2 cache for (Efficiency cluster)
- Samsung 14 nm LPP Process
- Performance core+L2 die size: 2.79mm^{2}

== Kryo 200 Series ==
The Kryo 200 Series CPUs is not a derivative of the original Kryo microarchitecture, but rather is a semi-custom design licensed under ARM’s Built on ARM Cortex Technology (BoC) license. The Kryo 200 Series CPUs is derivative of the ARM's Cortex-A73 for the Performance/Gold cluster and Cortex-A53 for the Efficiency/Silver cluster in a big.LITTLE arrangement.

=== Kryo 280 ===
The Kryo 280 CPU was announced along with the Snapdragon 835 Mobile Platform in November 2016. Compared to the original Kryo the new Kryo 280 core has improved integer instructions per clock but lower floating point instructions per clock. However overall the 835 was praised by reviewers for offering significant performance and efficiency advantage compared to the 820 and Exynos 8895 largely due to improvements in CPU scheduling and DVFS systems.

- 835: 4x Kryo 280 Performance @ 2.45 GHz + 4x Kryo 280 Efficiency @ 1.90 GHz
- 2 MB L2 cache (performance cluster) and 1 MB L2 cache (efficiency cluster)
- Samsung 10 nm LPE Process

=== Kryo 265 ===
The Kryo 265 CPU was announced along with the Snapdragon 680 Mobile Platform in October 2021.

- 685: 4x Kryo 265 Gold (Cortex-A73 derivative) @ 2.8 GHz + 4x Kryo 265 Silver (Cortex-A53 derivative) @ 1.9 GHz
- 680: 4x Kryo 265 Gold (Cortex-A73 derivative) @ 2.4 GHz + 4x Kryo 265 Silver (Cortex-A53 derivative) @ 1.9 GHz
- TSMC 6 nm N6 Process

=== Kryo 260 ===
The Kryo 260 CPU was announced along with the Snapdragon 660 Mobile Platform for mid-range smartphone in May 2017. The Kryo 260 cores are also used in the Snapdragon 636, Snapdragon 665, and Snapdragon 662.

- 665/662: 4x Kryo 260 Gold (Cortex-A73 derivative) @ 2.0 GHz + 4x Kryo 260 Silver (Cortex-A53 derivative) @ 1.8 GHz
- 660: 4x Kryo 260 Performance @ 2.2 GHz + 4x Kryo 260 Efficiency @ 1.8 GHz
- 636: 4x Kryo 260 Performance/Gold @ 1.8 GHz + 4x Kryo 260 Efficiency/Silver @ 1.6 GHz
- 2 MiB L2 cache for Performance/Gold and 1 MiB L2 cache for Efficiency/Silver cores
- 660/636: Samsung 14nm LPP Process
- 665/662: Samsung 11 nm LPP Process

=== Kryo 250 ===
Kryo 250 CPU was introduced in the Snapdragon 632 Mobile Platform, announced in June 2018. Also built on a 14 nm process, it is similar to Kryo 260, with a few differences in the size for L2 cache. Qualcomm claims the Snapdragon 632 has an increased performance of 40% compared to the Snapdragon 625/450, which only uses Cortex-A53 cores. Kryo 250 is also the first in the series to be used on an entry-level platform.

- 632: 4x Kryo 250 Performance (Cortex-A73 based) @ 1.8 GHz + 4x Kryo 250 Efficiency (Cortex-A53 based) @ 1.8 GHz
- Samsung 14LPP Process

=== Kryo 240 ===
Kryo 240 CPU was introduced in the Snapdragon 460 Mobile Platform, announced beginning 2020. Built on 11 nm process, uses Cortex-A73 and Cortex-A53 cores with big.LITTLE architecture. Qualcomm claims this CPU have an increased performance of 70% compared to previous generation (the Snapdragon 450), which only uses Cortex-A53 cores. Kryo 240 is to be used on an entry-level platform.

- 460: 4x Kryo 240 Gold (Cortex-A73 based) @ 1.8 GHz + 4x Kryo 240 Silver (Cortex-A53 based) @ 1.8 GHz
- 11 nm LPP process, first in Snapdragon 4-series line

== Kryo 300 Series ==
The Kryo 300 Series CPUs features semi-custom Gold and Silver cores derivative of Arm's Cortex-A75 and Cortex-A55 respectively, arranged in configurations with DynamIQ. These are Qualcomm's first CPUs to support ARMv8.2-A and DynamIQ. DynamIQ allows for more flexibility in CPU configuration including the amounts of cores/cache in each CPU clusters.

=== Kryo 385 ===
The Kryo 385 core was announced as a part of the Snapdragon 845 in December 2017. Qualcomm expected 25–30% increased performance in task run on the high-performance cores, and 15% increase on efficiency cores, relative to the Snapdragon 835. Testing found significant advantages in performance and efficiency compared with the Exynos 8895 and 9810. The Kryo 385 is also used in the Snapdragon 850.

- 845: 4x Kryo 385 Gold @ 2.8 GHz + 4x Kryo 385 Silver @ 1.8 GHz
- 850: 4x Kryo 385 Gold @ 2.95 GHz + 4x Kryo 385 Silver @ 1.8 GHz
- 4x256KB L2 cache for Gold and 4x128KB L2 cache for Silver
- 2MB L3 in DSU @ 1478 MHz and 3MB system cache
- Samsung 10 nm LPP Process
- CPU die size: 11.39mm²
- Gold core+L2 die size: 1.57mm²
- Silver core+L2 die size: ~0.53mm²

=== Kryo 360 ===
The Kryo 360 is Qualcomm's upper mid-range semi-custom core. It was introduced in Snapdragon 710, announced in May 2018. The Kryo 360 is also used in the Snapdragon 670 and 712.

- 712: 2x Kryo 360 Gold @ 2.3 GHz + 6x Kryo 360 Silver @ 1.7 GHz
- 710: 2x Kryo 360 Gold @ 2.2 GHz + 6x Kryo 360 Silver @ 1.7 GHz
- 670: 2x Kryo 360 Gold @ 2.0 GHz + 6x Kryo 360 Silver @ 1.7 GHz
- Samsung 10 nm LPP Process

== Kryo 400 Series ==
The Kryo 400 Series CPUs features semi-custom Gold Prime/Gold and Silver cores derivative of ARM's Cortex-A76 and Cortex-A55 respectively, arranged in configurations with DynamIQ. Qualcomm revealed that their semi-custom Cortex-A76 have larger out-of-order execution window (reorder buffer) and data prefetchers more optimised in floating point workloads.

=== Kryo 495 ===
The Kryo 495 CPU was announced with the Snapdragon 8cx on 6 December 2018. Qualcomm claims the 8cx is 60% more efficient than the Snapdragon 850.

- 8cx: 4x Kryo 495 Gold @ 2.84 GHz+ 4x Kryo 495 Silver @ 1.80 GHz
- Microsoft SQ1: 4x Kryo 495 Gold @ 3 GHz+ 4x Kryo 495 Silver @ 1.80 GHz
- 2MB L3 cache
- TSMC 7 nm CLN7FF (N7) Process

=== Kryo 490 ===
The Kryo 490 CPU was announced with the Snapdragon 8c on 5 December 2019.

- 8c: 4x Kryo 490 Gold @ 2.45 GHz + 4x Kryo 490 Silver
- 7 nm

=== Kryo 485 ===
The Kryo 485 CPU was announced with the Snapdragon 855 on 5 December 2018. Qualcomm claims up to 45% increase in performance compared to 845's Kryo 385. Testing found the 855 outperformed the 845 by 51% in SPECint2006, 61% in SPECfp2006 and 39% in power efficiency. The 855 also is significantly more efficient than the Exynos 9820.

- 855: 1x Kryo 485 Gold Prime @ 2.84 GHz + 3x Kryo 485 Gold @ 2.42 GHz + 4x Kryo 485 Silver @ 1.80 GHz
- 855+/860: 1x Kryo 485 Gold Prime @ 2.96 GHz + 3x Kryo 485 Gold @ 2.42 GHz + 4x Kryo 485 Silver @ 1.80 GHz
- 1x512KB pL2 cache for Gold Prime, 3x256KB pL2 cache for Gold and 4x128KB pL2 cache for Silver
- 2MB sL3 cache @ 1612 MHz and 3MB system level cache
- TSMC 7 nm CLN7FF (N7) Process

=== Kryo 475 ===
The Kryo 475 CPU is Qualcomm's upper mid-range semi-custom core. It was introduced on 4 December 2019 in the Snapdragon 765 and 765G, and May 2020 in the Snapdragon 768G.

- 768G: 1x Kryo 475 Prime @ 2.8 GHz + 1x Kryo 475 Gold @ 2.42 GHz + 6x Kryo 475 Silver @ 1.8 GHz
- 765: 1x Kryo 475 Prime @ 2.3 GHz + 1x Kryo 475 Gold @ 2.2 GHz + 6x Kryo 475 Silver @ 1.8 GHz
- 765G: 1x Kryo 475 Prime @ 2.4 GHz + 1x Kryo 475 Gold @ 2.2 GHz + 6x Kryo 475 Silver @ 1.8 GHz
- ?MB system level cache
- Samsung 7 nm EUV (7LPP) Process

=== Kryo 470 ===
The Kryo 470 CPU is Qualcomm's upper mid-range semi-custom core. It was introduced in April 2019 in the Snapdragon 730 and 730G, and August 2020 in the Snapdragon 732G.

- 732G: 2x Kryo 470 Gold @ 2.3 GHz + 6x Kryo 470 Silver @ 1.8 GHz
- 730/730G: 2x Kryo 470 Gold @ 2.2 GHz + 6x Kryo 470 Silver @ 1.8 GHz
- 256KB L2 cache for Gold and 128KB L2 cache for Silver cores
- 1MB system level cache
- Samsung 8 nm LPP Process

=== Kryo 468 ===
The Kryo 468 CPU was announced with the Snapdragon 7c on 5 December 2019.

- 7c: 2x Kryo 468 Gold @ 2.4 GHz + 6x Kryo 468 Silver
- 8 nm

=== Kryo 465 ===
The Kryo 465 CPU is Qualcomm's upper mid-range semi-custom core. It was introduced in January 2020 in the Snapdragon 720G, with hardware support for NavIC.

- 720G: 2x Kryo 465 Gold @ 2.3 GHz + 6x Kryo 465 Silver @ 1.8 GHz
- 1MB system level cache
- Samsung 8 nm LPP Process

=== Kryo 460 ===
The Kryo 460 CPU is Qualcomm's mid-range semi-custom core. It was introduced in October 2018 in the Snapdragon 675, in January 2021 in the Snapdragon 480

- 678: 2x Kryo 460 Gold @ 2.2 GHz + 6x Kryo 460 Silver @ 1.7 GHz
- 675: 2x Kryo 460 Gold @ 2.0 GHz + 6x Kryo 460 Silver @ 1.7 GHz
- 480+: 2x Kryo 460 Gold @ 2.2 GHz + 6x Kryo 460 Silver @ 1.8 GHz
- 480: 2x Kryo 460 Gold @ 2.0 GHz + 6x Kryo 460 Silver @ 1.8 GHz
- 256KB L2 cache for Gold and 64KB L2 cache for Silver cores
- 1MB system level cache
- 675/678: Samsung 11 nm LPP Process
- 480/480+: Samsung 8 nm LPP Process

== Kryo 500 Series ==
The Kryo 500 Series CPUs features semi-custom Prime/Gold and Silver cores derivative of ARM's Cortex-A77 and Cortex-A55 respectively, arranged in configurations with DynamIQ.

=== Kryo 585 ===
The Kryo 585 CPU was announced with the Snapdragon 865 on 4 December 2019. Qualcomm claims up to 25% increase in performance and 25% greater efficiency compared to the Kryo 485.

- 1x Kryo 585 Prime @ up to 2.84 GHz + 3x Kryo 585 Gold @ 2.42 GHz + 4x Kryo 585 Silver @ 1.80 GHz
- 1x 512 KB pL2 cache for Prime, 3x 256 KB pL2 cache for Gold and 4x 128 KB pL2 cache for Silver
- 4 MB sL3 cache and 3 MB system level cache
- TSMC 2nd generation 7 nm (N7P) Process

=== Kryo 570 ===
The Kryo 570 CPU was announced with the Snapdragon 750G on 22 September 2020.

- 2x Kryo 570 Gold @ 2.2 GHz + 6x Kryo 570 Silver @ 1.80 GHz
- 1 MB system level cache
- Samsung 8 nm LPP Process

=== Kryo 560 ===
The Kryo 560 CPU was announced with the Snapdragon 690 on 18 June 2020. Qualcomm claims up to 20% increase in performance compared to 675's Kryo 460.

- 690: 2x Kryo 560 Gold @ 2.0 GHz + 6x Kryo 560 Silver @ 1.70 GHz
- 1 MB system level cache
- Samsung 8 nm LPP Process

== Kryo 600 Series ==
The Kryo 600 Series CPUs features semi-custom Prime/Gold and Silver cores derivative of ARM's Cortex-X1/Cortex-A78 and Cortex-A55 respectively, arranged in configurations with DynamIQ.

=== Kryo 680 ===
The Kryo 680 CPU was announced with the Snapdragon 888 on 2 December 2020.

- 1 Kryo 680 Prime (ARM Cortex-X1 based), up to 2.84 GHz. Prime core with 1 MB pL2 and 64 KB pL1
- 3 Kryo 680 Gold (ARM Cortex-A78 based), up to 2.42 GHz. Performance cores with 512 KB pL2 each
- 4 Kryo 680 Silver (ARM Cortex-A55 based), up to 1.8 GHz. Efficiency cores with 128 KB pL2 each
- The Snapdragon 8cx has 4 Kryo 680 Prime, and 4 Kryo 680 Gold.
- Move to instruction set ARMv8.4-A (from ARMv8.2-A)
- DynamIQ with 4 MB sL3
- 3 MB system-level cache
- Samsung 5 nm LPE Process

=== Kryo 670 ===
The Kryo 670 CPU was announced with the Snapdragon 780G on 25 March 2021. It is also used in the Snapdragon 778G and 778G+, as well as the 782G.

- 1 Kryo 670 Prime (ARM Cortex-A78 based) @ 2.4-2.7 GHz
- 3 Kryo 670 Gold (ARM Cortex-A78 based) @ 2.2 GHz
- 4 Kryo 670 Silver (ARM Cortex-A55 based) @ 1.9 GHz
- 778G/778G+/782G: TSMC 6 nm (N6) Process
- 780G: Samsung 5 nm LPE Process

=== Kryo 660 ===
The Kryo 660 CPU was announced with the Snapdragon 695 on 26 October 2021.

- 2 Kryo 660 Gold (ARM Cortex-A78 based) @ 2.2 GHz
- 6 Kryo 660 Silver (ARM Cortex-A55 based) @ 1.8 GHz
- TSMC 6 nm (N6) Process

== Kryo ==
On November 22 2021, Qualcomm updated its Snapdragon branding and removed the numbering scheme on their Kryo CPUs and Adreno GPUs.

=== Kryo Mobile Platforms ===
==== 8 series ====
===== Gen 1 =====
The Snapdragon 8 Gen 1 was announced on 30 November 2021.

- 1 Kryo Prime (ARM Cortex-X2 based), up to 3.2 GHz. Prime core with 1 MB pL2 and 64 KB pL1
- 3 Kryo Gold (ARM Cortex-A710 based), up to 2.75 GHz. Performance cores with 512 KB pL2 each
- 4 Kryo Silver (ARM Cortex-A510 based), up to 2.0 GHz. Efficiency cores with 128 KB pL2 each
- Move to instruction set ARMv9-A (from ARMv8.4-A)
- DynamIQ with 6 MB sL3
- 4 MB system-level cache
- 8 Gen 1: Samsung 4 nm LPE Process
- 8+ Gen 1: TSMC N4 Process

===== Gen 2 =====
The Snapdragon 8 Gen 2 was announced on November 15 2022.

- 1 Kryo Prime (ARM Cortex-X3 based), up to 3.36 GHz. Prime core with 1 MB pL2 and 64 KB pL1
- 4 Kryo Gold (2 ARM Cortex-A715, 2 ARM Cortex-A710 based), up to 2.8 GHz. Performance cores with 512 KB pL2 each
- 3 Kryo Silver (ARM Cortex-A510 based), up to 2.0 GHz. Efficiency cores with 128 KB pL2 each
- DynamIQ with 8 MB sL3
- 4 MB system-level cache
- TSMC N4 Process

==== 7 series ====
===== Gen 1 =====
The Snapdragon 7 Gen 1 was announced on May 20 2022.

- 1 Kryo Prime (ARM Cortex-A710 based) @ 2.4 GHz
- 3 Kryo Gold (ARM Cortex-A710 based) @ 2.36 GHz
- 4 Kryo Silver (ARM Cortex-A510 based) @ 1.8 GHz
- Samsung 4 nm LPE Process

===== Gen 2 =====
The Snapdragon 7+ Gen 2 was announced on March 17, 2023.

- 1 Kryo Prime (ARM Cortex-X2 based) @ 2.91 GHz
- 3 Kryo Gold (ARM Cortex-A710 based) @ 2.49 GHz
- 4 Kryo Silver (ARM Cortex-A510 based) @ 1.8 GHz
- Snapdragon 7+ Gen 2: TSMC 4 nm N4 Process

=== Kryo Compute Platforms ===
==== 8cx series ====
===== Gen 3 =====
The Snapdragon 8cx Gen 3 was announced on December 1 2021.

- 4 Kryo Prime (ARM Cortex-X1 based), up to 3.0 GHz. Performance cores with 1 MB pL2 and 64 KB pL1
- 4 Kryo Gold (ARM Cortex-A78 based), up to 2.42 GHz. Efficiency cores with 512 KB pL2 each
- Move to instruction set ARMv8.4-A (from ARMv8.2-A)
- DynamIQ with 8 MB sL3
- 6 MB system-level cache
- Samsung 5 nm LPE Process

==== 7c+ series ====
===== Gen 3 =====
The Snapdragon 7c+ Gen 3 was announced on December 1 2021.

- 4 Kryo Silver (ARM Cortex-A55 r2p0 based)
- 4 Kryo Gold (ARM Cortex-A78 r1p1 based)
- Up to 2.4 GHz
- TSMC 6 nm N6 Process

== Oryon ==
On November 17 2022, Qualcomm announced that Qualcomm Oryon CPUs will replace Qualcomm Kryo CPUs

== See also ==
- Oryon (CPU)
- Krait (CPU)
- Scorpion (CPU)
- Comparison of ARMv8-A cores
- List of Qualcomm Snapdragon processors
- Always Connected PC (ACPC)
