= ARM Cortex-A720 =

High-performance CPU core design

General information
- Launched: 2023
- Designed by: ARM Ltd.

Cache
- L1 cache: 64/128 KiB (32/64 KiB I-cache with parity, 32/64 KiB D-cache) per core
- L2 cache: 128–512 KiB per core
- L3 cache: 512 KiB – 32 MiB (optional)

Architecture and classification
- Microarchitecture: ARM Cortex-A720
- Instruction set: ARMv9.2-A

Products, models, variants
- Product code name: "Hunter"
- Variant: ARM Cortex-X4

History
- Predecessor: ARM Cortex-A715
- Successor: ARM Cortex-A725

The ARM Cortex-A720 is a CPU core model from Arm unveiled in 2023. It serves as a successor to the ARM Cortex-A715.

Cortex-A700 CPU cores series focus on balanced performance and efficiency, and the CPU core can be paired with other cores in its family such as the high performance ARM Cortex-X4 or/and high efficiency ARM Cortex-A520 in a CPU cluster. It can be used as either "big" or "LITTLE".

== Architecture changes in comparison with ARM Cortex-A715 ==
- Update to ARMv9.2
- 15% peak performance improvement over the Cortex-A715
- Can down to same size as Cortex-A78 with 10% performance improvement
- Area optimize configuration for no area cost vs Cortex-A78
- Down L2 cache hit latency to 9 cycles (from 10 cycles)
- Down mispredict latency to 11 cycles (from 12 cycles)
- x2 L2 bandwidth
- DSU-120
  - Up to 14 cores (up from 12 cores)
  - Up to 32 MiB of shared L3 cache (increased from 16 MiB)

== Architecture comparison ==
"big" core

| μArch | Cortex-A77 | Cortex-A78 | Cortex-A710 | Cortex-A715 | Cortex-A720 | Cortex-A725 |
|---|---|---|---|---|---|---|
| Codename | Deimos | Hercules | Matterhorn | Makalu | Hunter | Chaberton |
| Peak clock speed | 2.6 GHz | ~3.0 GHz | | | | - |
| Architecture | ARMv8.2-A | | ARMv9.0-A | | ARMv9.2-A | |
| AArch | - | 32-bit and 64-bit | | 64-bit | | |
| Max In-flight | 160 | 160 | ? | 192+ | - | - |
| L0 (Mops entries) | - | 1536 | | 0 | | - |
| L1 (I + D) (KiB) | 64 + 64 KiB | 32/64 + 32/64 KiB | | | | 64 + 64 KiB |
| L2 Cache (KiB) | 256–512 KiB | 128–512 KiB | | | | 128 KiB–1 MiB |
| L3 Cache (MiB) | 0–4 MiB | 0–8 MiB | 0–16 MiB | | 0–32 MiB | |
| Decode width | 4-way | | | 5-way | | |
| Dispatch | 6 Mops/cycle | | 5 Mops/cycle | | ? | - |

== Usage ==
- Google • Tensor G4
- MediaTek • Dimensity 9300(+)
- Qualcomm • Snapdragon 6 Gen 4 • Snapdragon 7s/7+ Gen 3 • Snapdragon 8(s) Gen 3
- Samsung • Exynos 1580 • Exynos 2400
- Cixtech • Cix P1/CD8180

== See also ==
- ARM Cortex-X4, related high performance microarchitecture
- ARM Cortex-A520, related high efficient microarchitecture
- Comparison of ARMv8-A cores
