= ARM Cortex-X3 =

CPU core

General information
- Launched: 2022
- Designed by: Arm

Performance
- Max. CPU clock rate: 3.3 GHz to 3.6 GHz
- Address width: 40-bit

Physical specifications
- Cores: 1–8 (per cluster)

Cache
- L1 cache: 128 KiB (64 KiB I-cache with parity, 64 KiB D-cache) per core
- L2 cache: 256–1024 KiB per core
- L3 cache: 512 KiB – 16 MiB (optional)

Architecture and classification
- Microarchitecture: ARM Cortex-X3
- Instruction set: ARMv9.0-A

Products, models, variants
- Product code name: Makalu ELP
- Variant: ARM Cortex-A715

History
- Predecessor: ARM Cortex-X2
- Successor: ARM Cortex-X4

The ARM Cortex-X3 is the third generation X-series high-performance CPU core from Arm.

It forms part of Arm's Total Compute Solutions 2022 (TCS22) along with Arm's Cortex-A715, Cortex-A510, Immortalis-G715 and CoreLink CI-700/NI-700.

== Architecture changes in comparison with ARM Cortex-X2 ==
The processor implements the following changes:

- Decode width: 6 (increased from 5)
- Rename / Dispatch width: 8
- micro-op (MOP) cache: 1.5k entries (reduced from 3k)
- Reorder buffer (ROB): 320 entries (increased from 288)
- Execution ports: 15
- Pipeline length: 9 (reduced from 10)

Performance claims:

- 25% peak performance improvement over the ARM Cortex-X2 in smartphones (3.3GHz, 1MB L2, 8MB L3).
- 11% IPC uplift over the ARM Cortex-X2, when based on the same process, clock speed, and cache setup (also known as ISO-process).

== Usage ==
- Google • Tensor G3
- MediaTek • Dimensity 9200
- Qualcomm • Snapdragon 8 Gen 2

== Architecture comparison ==
"Prime" core

uArch	Cortex-A78	Cortex-X1	Cortex-X2	Cortex-X3	Cortex-X4	Cortex-X925
Code name	Hercules	Hera	Matterhorn-ELP	Makalu-ELP	Hunter-ELP	Blackhawk
Architecture	ARMv8.2		ARMv9		ARMv9.2	
Peak clock speed	~3.0 GHz			~3.3 GHz	~3.4 GHz	~3.8 GHz
Decode width	4	5		6	10	
Dispatch	6/cycle	8/cycle			10/cycle	
Max in-flight	2x 160	2x 224	2x 288	2x 320	2x 384	2x 768
L0 (Mops entries)	1536	3072		1536	0	
L1-I + L1-D	32+32 KiB	64+64 KiB				
L2	128–512 KiB	0.25–1 MiB			0.5–2 MiB	2–3 MiB
L3	0–8 MiB		0–16 MiB		0–32 MiB	

== See also ==
- ARM Cortex-A715, related high performance microarchitecture
- Comparison of ARMv8-A cores, ARMv8 family
