= ARM Cortex-A725 =

High-performance CPU core design

General information
- Launched: 2024
- Designed by: ARM Ltd.

Cache
- L1 cache: 64/128 KiB (32/64 KiB I-cache with parity, 32/64 KiB D-cache) per core
- L2 cache: 128 KiB – 1 MiB per core
- L3 cache: 256 KiB – 32 MiB (optional)

Architecture and classification
- Microarchitecture: ARM Cortex-A725
- Instruction set: ARMv9.2-A

Products, models, variants
- Product code name: "Chaberton"
- Variant: ARM Cortex-X925

History
- Predecessor: ARM Cortex-A720
- Successor: ARM C1-Pro

The ARM Cortex-A725 is a CPU core model from Arm unveiled in 2024. It serves as a successor to the ARM Cortex-A720. Cortex-A700 CPU cores series focus on balanced performance and efficiency, and the CPU core can be paired with other cores in its family, such as the high-performance ARM Cortex-X925 and/or high-efficiency ARM Cortex-A520 in a CPU cluster. It can be used as either "big" or "LITTLE".

== Architecture changes in comparison with ARM Cortex-A720 ==
- 25% improvement in efficiency
- 12% peak performance improvement
- 20% improvement in L3 cache traffic
- Double the L2 cache size
- Improved DSU-120

== Usage ==
- Google • Tensor G5 used in the Pixel 10 series
- MediaTek • Dimensity 8400
- Samsung • Exynos 2500

== See also ==
- ARM Cortex-X925, related high performance microarchitecture
- ARM Cortex-A520, related high efficiency microarchitecture
