= ARM Cortex-X2 =

Microprocessor core model by ARM

General information
- Launched: 2021
- Designed by: Arm

Performance
- Max. CPU clock rate: 2.85 GHz to 3.0 GHz
- Address width: 40-bit

Physical specifications
- Cores: 1–12 (per cluster)

Cache
- L1 cache: 128 KiB (64 KiB I-cache with parity, 64 KiB D-cache) per core
- L2 cache: 256–1024 KiB per core
- L3 cache: 512 KiB – 16 MiB (optional)

Architecture and classification
- Microarchitecture: ARM Cortex-X2
- Instruction set: ARMv9.0-A

Products, models, variants
- Product code name: Matterhorn ELP
- Variant: ARM Cortex-A710

History
- Predecessor: ARM Cortex-X1
- Successor: ARM Cortex-X3

The ARM Cortex-X2 is a CPU implementing the ARMv9-A 64-bit instruction set designed by ARM Holdings' Austin design centre as part of ARM's Cortex-X Custom (CXC) program.

It forms part of Arm's Total Compute Solutions 2021 (TCS21) along with Arm's Cortex-A710, Cortex-A510, Mali-G710 and CoreLink CI-700/NI-700.

== Architecture changes in comparison with ARM Cortex-X1 ==
The processor implements the following changes:

- ARMv9.0
- 10 cycle pipeline down from 11, created by reducing the dispatch stage from 2 cycles to 1
- Reorder buffer (ROB) increased by 30% from 224 entries to 288
- dTLB increased by 20% from 40 entries to 48
- SVE2 SIMD support
- Bfloat16 data type support
- Support for Aarch32 removed
- DSU-110
  - Up to 12 cores (up from 8 cores)
  - Up to 16M L3 cache (up from 8 MB)
- CoreLink CI-700/NI-700
  - Up to 32MB SLC

Performance claims:

- Comparing the Cortex-X2 to the Cortex-X1 with the same process,
  clock speed, and 4MB of L3 cache (also known as ISO-process):
  - 16% greater integer performance / IPC
  - 100% greater ML performance
- 30% peak performance improvement over the Cortex-X1 in smartphones (3.3 GHz, 1MB L2, 8MB L3)
- 40% faster than an Intel Core i5-1135G7 at 15W (3.5 GHz, 1MB L2, 16MB L3)

== Architecture comparison ==
"Prime" core

uArch	Cortex-A78	Cortex-X1	Cortex-X2	Cortex-X3	Cortex-X4	Cortex-X925
Code name	Hercules	Hera	Matterhorn-ELP	Makalu-ELP	Hunter-ELP	Blackhawk
Architecture	ARMv8.2		ARMv9		ARMv9.2	
Peak clock speed	~3.0 GHz			~3.3 GHz	~3.4 GHz	~3.8 GHz
Decode width	4	5		6	10	
Dispatch	6/cycle	8/cycle			10/cycle	
Max in-flight	2x 160	2x 224	2x 288	2x 320	2x 384	2x 768
L0 (Mops entries)	1536	3072		1536	0	
L1-I + L1-D	32+32 KiB	64+64 KiB				
L2	128–512 KiB	0.25–1 MiB			0.5–2 MiB	2–3 MiB
L3	0–8 MiB		0–16 MiB		0–32 MiB	

== Usage ==
- MediaTek • Dimensity 9000(+)
- Qualcomm • Snapdragon 7+ Gen 2 • Snapdragon 8/8+ Gen 1
- Samsung • Exynos 2200

== See also ==
- ARM Cortex-A710, related high performance microarchitecture
- Comparison of ARMv8-A cores, ARMv8 family
