= ARM Cortex-A520 =

CPU microarchitecture designed by ARM

General information
- Launched: 2023
- Designed by: ARM Ltd.

Performance
- Max. CPU clock rate: 1.8 GHz to 2.27 GHz

Cache
- L1 cache: 64/128 KiB (32/64 KiB I-cache with parity, 32/64 KiB D-cache) per core
- L2 cache: 0–512 KiB per complex
- L3 cache: 256 KiB – 32 MiB (optional)

Architecture and classification
- Microarchitecture: ARM Cortex-A520
- Instruction set: ARMv9.2-A

Products, models, variants
- Product code name: Hayes

History
- Predecessor: ARM Cortex-A510
- Successor: ARM C1-Nano

The ARM Cortex-A520 is a CPU microarchitecture designed by Arm Holdings and licensed as a semiconductor intellectual property core. It implements the 64-bit ARMv9 instruction set and supports heterogeneous computing via a big.LITTLE configuration. The design succeeds the Cortex-A510 in its role as a low performance, power efficient core, and is announced in 2023 together with the Cortex-A720 and the X4.

== Technical overview ==
The A520 is an in-order CPU core intended for low-performance, low-power workloads.

- ARMv9.2 instruction set
- Claimed performance improvement of up to 8% over the Cortex-A510
- Support only Aarch64 applications
- Optional L2 cache of up to 512KiB per core
- Supports QARMA3 pointer authentication codes (PAC)

== Architecture comparison ==
"LITTLE" core

uArch	Cortex-A53	Cortex-A55	Cortex-A510	Cortex-A520
Codename	Apollo	Ananke	Klein	Hayes
Peak clock speed	~2 GHz			
Architecture	ARMv8.0-A	ARMv8.2-A	ARMv9.0-A	ARMv9.2-A
AArch	32-bit and 64-bit			64-bit
Branch predictor history (entries)	3072	-		
Out-of-order execution	No			
L0 Cache	No			
L1-I + L1-D	8/64+8/64 KiB	16/64+16/64 KiB	32/64+32/64 KiB	
L2	0–256 KiB		0–512 KiB	
L3	None	0–4 MiB	0–16 MiB	0–32 MiB
Decode Width	2		3	3 (2 ALU)
Dispatch	8			

== See also ==
- ARM Cortex-X4, related high performance microarchitecture
- ARM Cortex-A720, related efficient sustained performance microarchitecture
- Comparison of ARMv8-A cores, ARMv8 family
