= ARM Cortex-A34 =

Family of microprocessor cores with ARM microarchitecture

General information
- Launched: 2019
- Designed by: ARM Holdings

Physical specifications
- Cores: 1–4 per cluster, multiple clusters

Cache
- L1 cache: 16–128 KB (8–64 KB I-cache with parity, 8–64 KB D-cache) per core
- L2 cache: 128–1024 KB
- L3 cache: No

Architecture and classification
- Application: Mobile; Network Infrastructure; Automotive designs Servers
- Instruction set: ARMv8-A

History
- Predecessor: ARM Cortex-A32 (32-bit only)

The ARM Cortex-A34 is a low power central processing unit implementing the ARMv8.2-A 64-bit instruction set designed by ARM Ltd.

== Licensing ==
The Cortex-A34 is available as a SIP core to licensees whilst its design makes it suitable for integration with other SIP cores (e.g. GPU, display controller, DSP, image processor, etc.) into one die constituting a system on a chip (SoC).

== Technical ==
Architecture	64-bit Armv8-A (AArch64 only)
Multicore	Up to 4 core
Superscalar	Partial
Pipeline	In order (like ARM Cortex-A53 and ARM Cortex-A55)
L1 I-Cache / D-Cache	8k-64k
L2 Cache	128KB-1MB
ISA Support	Only AArch64 for 64-bit ARM NEON TrustZone VFPv4 Floating point
Debug & Trace	CoreSight SoC-400

== See also ==
- Comparison of ARMv8-A cores, ARMv8 family
- Comparison of ARMv7-A cores, ARMv7 family
