= Comparison of ARM processors =

This is a comparison of ARM instruction set architecture application processor cores designed by Arm Holdings (ARM Cortex-A) and 3rd parties. It does not include ARM Cortex-R, ARM Cortex-M, or legacy ARM cores.

== ARMv7-A ==
This is a table comparing 32-bit central processing units that implement the ARMv7-A (A means Application) instruction set architecture and mandatory or optional extensions of it, the last AArch32.

Core	Decode width	Execution ports	Pipeline depth	Out-of-order execution	FPU	Pipelined VFP	FPU registers	NEON (SIMD)	big.LITTLE role	Virtualization	Process technology	L0 cache	L1 cache	L2 cache	Core configurations	Speed per core (DMIPS/ MHz)	ARM part number (in the main ID register)
ARM Cortex-A5	1		8	No	VFPv4 (optional)		16 × 64-bit	64-bit wide (optional)	No	No	40/28 nm		4–64 KiB / core		1, 2, 4	1.57	0xC05
ARM Cortex-A7	2	5	8	No	VFPv4 (optional)	Yes	(16 or 32) × 64-bit	64-bit wide	LITTLE	Yes	40/28 nm		8–64 KiB / core	up to 1 MiB (optional)	1, 2, 4, 8	1.9	0xC07
ARM Cortex-A8	2	2	13	No	VFPv3	No	32 × 64-bit	64-bit wide	No	No	65/55/45 nm		32 KiB + 32 KiB	256 or 512 (typical) KiB	1	2.0	0xC08
ARM Cortex-A9	2	3	8–11	Yes	VFPv3 (optional)	Yes	(16 or 32) × 64-bit	64-bit wide (optional)	Companion Core	No	65/45/40/32/28 nm		32 KiB + 32 KiB	1 MiB	1, 2, 4	2.5	0xC09
ARM Cortex-A12	2		11	Yes	VFPv4	Yes	32 × 64-bit	128-bit wide	No	Yes	28 nm		32–64 KiB + 32 KiB	256 KiB, to 8 MiB	1, 2, 4	3.0	0xC0D
ARM Cortex-A15	3	8	15/17-25	Yes	VFPv4	Yes	32 × 64-bit	128-bit wide	big	Yes	32/28/20 nm		32 KiB + 32 KiB per core	up to 4 MiB per cluster, up to 8 MiB per chip	2, 4, 8 (4×2)	3.5 to 4.01	0xC0F
ARM Cortex-A17	2		11+	Yes	VFPv4	Yes	32 × 64-bit	128-bit wide	big	Yes	28 nm		32 KiB + 32 KiB per core	256 KiB, up to 8 MiB	up to 4	4.0	0xC0E
Qualcomm Scorpion	2	3	10	Yes (FXU&LSU only)	VFPv3	Yes		128-bit wide	No		65/45 nm		32 KiB + 32 KiB	256 KiB (single-core); 512 KiB (dual-core)	1, 2	2.1	0x00F
Qualcomm Krait	3	7	11	Yes	VFPv4	Yes		128-bit wide	No		28 nm	4 KiB + 4 KiB direct mapped	16 KiB + 16 KiB 4-way set associative	1 MiB 8-way set associative (dual-core) / 2 MiB (quad-core)	2, 4	3.3 (Krait 200); 3.39 (Krait 300); 3.39 (Krait 400); 3.51 (Krait 450)	0x04D 0x06F
Swift	3	5	12	Yes	VFPv4	Yes	32 × 64-bit	128-bit wide	No		32 nm		32 KiB + 32 KiB	1 MiB	2	3.5	?
Core	Decode width	Execution ports	Pipeline depth	Out-of-order execution	FPU	Pipelined VFP	FPU registers	NEON (SIMD)	big.LITTLE role	Virtualization	Process technology	L0 cache	L1 cache	L2 cache	Core configurations	Speed per core (DMIPS / MHz)	ARM part number (in the main ID register)

== ARMv8-A ==
This is a table of central processing units (CPUs) that implement the ARMv8-A instruction set architecture and mandatory or optional extensions of it. Almost all of these CPUs support the 64-bit AArch64 Execution State, and many of them support the 32-bit AArch32 Execution State for legacy applications. All chips of this type have a floating-point unit (FPU) that is better than the one in older ARMv7-A and NEON (SIMD) CPUs. Some of these CPUs have coprocessors also include cores from the older 32-bit architecture (ARMv7). Some of the CPUs are SoCs and can combine both ARM Cortex-A53 and ARM Cortex-A57, such as the Samsung Exynos 7 Octa.

Company	Core	Released	Revision	32-bit support	Decode	Pipeline depth	Out-of-order execution		Branch prediction	big.LITTLE role	Exec. ports	SIMD	Fab (in nm)	Simult. MT	L0 cache	L1 cache Instr + Data (in KiB)	L2 cache	L3 cache	Core configurations	Speed per core (DMIPS/MHz (Note: As Dhrystone (implied in "DMIPS") is a synthetic benchmark developed in 1980s, it is no longer representative of prevailing workloads – use with caution.))	Clock rate	ARM part number (in the main ID register)
Company	Core	Released	Revision	32-bit support	Decode	Pipeline depth	Have it	Entries	Branch prediction	big.LITTLE role	Exec. ports	SIMD	Fab (in nm)	Simult. MT	L0 cache	L1 cache Instr + Data (in KiB)	L2 cache	L3 cache	Core configurations	Speed per core (DMIPS/MHz)	Clock rate	ARM part number (in the main ID register)
ARM	Cortex-A32	2017	ARMv8.0-A (only 32-bit)	Yes	2-wide	8	No	0	?	LITTLE	?	?	28	No	No	8–64 + 8–64	0–1 MiB	No	1–4+	2.3	?	0xD01
ARM	Cortex-A34	2019	ARMv8.0-A	No	2-wide	8	No	0	?	LITTLE	?	?	?	No	No	8–64 + 8–64	0–1 MiB	No	1–4+	?	?	0xD02
ARM	Cortex-A35	2017	ARMv8.0-A	Yes	2-wide	8	No	0	Yes	LITTLE	?	?	28 / 16 / 14 / 10	No	No	8–64 + 8–64	0 / 128 KiB–1 MiB	No	1–4+	1.7-1.85	?	0xD04
ARM	Cortex-A53	2014	ARMv8.0-A	Yes	2-wide	8	No	0	Conditional+ Indirect branch prediction	big/LITTLE	2	?	28 / 20 / 16 / 14 / 12 / 10 / 4	No	No	8–64 + 8–64	128 KiB–2 MiB	No	1–4+	2.24	?	0xD03
ARM	Cortex-A55	2017	ARMv8.2-A	Yes	2-wide	8	No	0	Conditional+ Indirect branch prediction	big/LITTLE	2	?	28 / 20 / 16 / 14 / 12 / 10 / 5	No	No	16–64 + 16–64	0–256 KiB/core	0–4 MiB	1–8+	2.65	?	0xD05
ARM	Cortex-A57	2013	ARMv8.0-A	Yes	3-wide	15	Yes; 3-wide dispatch	?	?	big	8	?	28 / 20 / 16 / 14	No	No	48 + 32	0.5–2 MiB	No	1–4+	4.1-4.8	?	0xD07
ARM	Cortex-A65	2019	ARMv8.2-A	No	2-wide	10-12	Yes; 4-wide dispatch		Two-level	?	9		?	SMT2	No	32–64 + 32–64 KiB	0, 64–256 KiB	0, 0.5–4 MiB	1-8	?	?	0xD06
ARM	Cortex-A65AE	2019	ARMv8.2-A	No	?	?	Yes		Two-level	?	2		?	SMT2	No	32–64 + 32–64 KiB	64–256 KiB	0, 0.5–4 MiB	1–8	?	?	0xD43
ARM	Cortex-A72	2015	ARMv8.0-A	Yes	3-wide	15	Yes; 5-wide dispatch		Two-level	big	8		28 / 16	No	No	48 + 32	0.5–4 MiB	No	1–4+	4.7-6.3	?	0xD08
ARM	Cortex-A73	2016	ARMv8.0-A	Yes	2-wide	11–12	Yes; 4-wide dispatch		Two-level	big	7		28 / 16 / 10	No	No	64 + 32/64	1–8 MiB	No	1–4+	4.8–8.5	?	0xD09
ARM	Cortex-A75	2017	ARMv8.2-A	Yes	3-wide	11–13	Yes; 6-wide dispatch		Two-level	big	8?	2*128b	28 / 16 / 10	No	No	64 + 64	256–512 KiB/core	0–4 MiB	1–8+	6.1–9.5	?	0xD0A
ARM	Cortex-A76	2018	ARMv8.2-A	EL0 only	4-wide	11–13	Yes; 8-wide dispatch	128	Two-level	big	8	2*128b	10 / 7	No	No	64 + 64	256–512 KiB/core	1–4 MiB	1–4	6.4	?	0xD0B
ARM	Cortex-A76AE	2018	ARMv8.2-A	EL0 only	?	?	Yes	128	Two-level	big	?		?	No	No	?	?	?	?	?	?	0xD0E
ARM	Cortex-A77	2019	ARMv8.2-A	EL0 only	4-wide	11–13	Yes; 10-wide dispatch	160	Two-level	big	12	2*128b	7	No	1.5K entries	64 + 64	256–512 KiB/core	1–4 MiB	1–4	7.3	?	0xD0D
ARM	Cortex-A78	2020	ARMv8.2-A	EL0 only	4-wide		Yes	160	Yes	big	13	2*128b		No	1.5K entries	32/64 + 32/64	256–512 KiB/core	1–4 MiB	1–4	7.6-8.2	?	0xD41
ARM	Cortex-X1	2020	ARMv8.2-A	EL0 only	5-wide	?	Yes	224	Yes	big	15	4*128b		No	3K entries	64 + 64	up to 1 MiB	up to 8 MiB	custom	10-11	?	0xD44
Apple	Cyclone	2013	ARMv8.0-A	?	6-wide	16	Yes	192	Yes	No	9		28	No	No	64 + 64	1 MiB	4 MiB	2	?	1.3–1.4 GHz	
Apple	Typhoon	2014	ARMv8.0‑A	?	6-wide	16	Yes		Yes	No	9		20	No	No	64 + 64	1 MiB	4 MiB	2, 3 (A8X)	?	1.1–1.5 GHz	
Apple	Twister	2015	ARMv8.0‑A	?	6-wide	16	Yes		Yes	No	9		16 / 14	No	No	64 + 64	3 MiB	4 MiB; No (A9X)	2	?	1.85–2.26 GHz	
Apple	Hurricane	2016	ARMv8.0‑A	?	6-wide	16	Yes			"big" (In A10/A10X paired with "LITTLE" Zephyr cores)	9	3*128b	16 (A10); 10 (A10X)	No	No	64 + 64	3 MiB (A10); 8 MiB (A10X)	4 MiB (A10); No (A10X)	2x Hurricane (A10); 3x Hurricane (A10X)	?	2.34–2.36 GHz	
Apple	Zephyr	2016	ARMv8.0‑A	?	3-wide	12	Yes			LITTLE	5		16 (A10); 10 (A10X)	No	No	32 + 32	1 MiB	4 MiB (A10); No (A10X)	2x Zephyr (A10); 3x Zephyr (A10X)	?	1.09–1.3 GHz	
Apple	Monsoon	2017	ARMv8.2‑A	?	7-wide	16	Yes			"big" (In Apple A11 paired with "LITTLE" Mistral cores)	11	3*128b	10	No	No	64 + 64	8 MiB	No	2x Monsoon	?	2.39 GHz	
Apple	Mistral	2017	ARMv8.2‑A	?	3-wide	12	Yes			LITTLE	5		10	No	No	32 + 32	1 MiB	No	4× Mistral	?	1.19 GHz	
Apple	Vortex	2018	ARMv8.3‑A	?	7-wide	16	Yes			"big" (In Apple A12/Apple A12X/Apple A12Z paired with "LITTLE" Tempest cores)	11	3*128b	7	No	No	128 + 128	8 MiB	No	2x Vortex (A12); 4x Vortex (A12X/A12Z)	?	2.49 GHz	
Apple	Tempest	2018	ARMv8.3‑A	?	3-wide	12	Yes			LITTLE	5		7	No	No	32 + 32	2 MiB	No	4x Tempest	?	1.59 GHz	
Apple	Lightning	2019	ARMv8.4‑A	?	8-wide	16	Yes	560		"big" (In Apple A13 paired with "LITTLE" Thunder cores)	11	3*128b	7	No	No	128 + 128	8 MiB	No	2x Lightning	?	2.65 GHz	
Apple	Thunder	2019	ARMv8.4‑A	?	3-wide	12	Yes			LITTLE	5		7	No	No	96 + 48	4 MiB	No	4x Thunder	?	1.8 GHz	
Apple	Firestorm	2020	ARMv8.4-A	?	8-wide		Yes	630		"big" (In Apple A14 and Apple M1/M1 Pro/M1 Max/M1 Ultra paired with "LITTLE" Icestorm cores)	14	4*128b	5	No		192 + 128	8 MiB (A14); 12 MiB (M1); 24 MiB (M1 Pro/M1 Max); 48 MiB (M1 Ultra)	No	2x Firestorm (A14); 4x Firestorm (M1) 6x or 8x Firestorm (M1 Pro); 8x Firestorm (M1 Max); 16x Firestorm (M1 Ultra)	?	3.0–3.23 GHz	
Apple	Icestorm	2020	ARMv8.4-A	?	4-wide		Yes	110		LITTLE	7	2*128b	5	No		128 + 64	4 MiB; 8 MiB (M1 Ultra)	No	4x Icestorm (A14/M1); 2x Icestorm (M1 Pro/Max); 4x Icestorm (M1 Ultra)	?	1.82–2.06 GHz	
Apple	Avalanche	2021	ARMv8.6‑A	?	8-wide		Yes			"big" (In Apple A15 and Apple M2/M2 Pro/M2 Max/M2 Ultra paired with "LITTLE" Blizzard cores)	14	4*128b	5	No		192 + 128	12 MiB (A15); 16 MiB (M2); 32 MiB (M2 Pro/M2 Max); 64 MiB (M2 Ultra)	No	2x Avalanche (A15); 4x Avalanche (M2); 6x or 8x Avalanche (M2 Pro) 8x Avalanche (M2 Max); 16x Avalanche (M2 Ultra)	?	2.93–3.49 GHz	
Apple	Blizzard	2021	ARMv8.6‑A	?	4-wide		Yes			LITTLE	8	2*128b	5	No		128 + 64	4 MiB; 8 MiB (M2 Ultra)	No	4x Blizzard	?	2.02–2.42 GHz	
Apple	Everest	2022	ARMv8.6‑A	?	8-wide		Yes			"big" (In Apple A16 paired with "LITTLE" Sawtooth cores)	14	4*128b	5	No		192 + 128	16 MiB	No	2x Everest	?	3.46 GHz	
Apple	Sawtooth	2022	ARMv8.6‑A	?	4-wide		Yes			LITTLE	8	2*128b	5	No		128 + 64	4 MiB	No	4x Sawtooth	?	2.02 GHz	
Nvidia	Denver	2014	ARMv8‑A	?	2-wide ARM or binary translated VLIW	13	If translated into VLIW code by software		Direct+ Indirect branch prediction	No	7		28	No	No	128 + 64	2 MiB	No	2	?	?	
Nvidia	Denver 2	2016	ARMv8‑A	?	?	13	If translated into VLIW code by software	Direct+ Indirect branch prediction	"Super" Nvidia's own implementation	?		16	No	No	128 + 64	2 MiB	No	2	?	?		
Nvidia	Carmel	2018	ARMv8.2‑A	?	?				Direct+ Indirect branch prediction		?		12	No	No	128 + 64	2 MiB	(4 MiB @ 8 cores)	2 (+ 8)	6.5-7.4	?	
Cavium	ThunderX	2014	ARMv8-A	?	2-wide	9	Yes		Two-level		?		28	No	No	78 + 32	16 MiB	No	8–16, 24–48	?	?	
Cavium	ThunderX2 (Note: ex. Broadcom Vulcan)	2018	ARMv8.1-A	?	4-wide "4 μops"	?	Yes		Multi-level	?	?		16	SMT4	No	32 + 32 (data 8-way)	256 KiB per core	1 MiB per core	16–32	?	?	
Marvell	ThunderX3	2020	ARMv8.3+	?	8-wide	?	Yes; 4-wide dispatch		Multi-level	?	7		7	SMT4	?	64 + 32	512 KiB per core	90 MiB	60	?	?	
Applied Micro	Helix	2014	?	?	?	?	?		?	?	?		40 / 28	No	No	32 + 32 (per core; write-through w/parity)	256 KiB shared per core pair (with ECC)	1 MiB/core	2, 4, 8	?	?	
Applied Micro	X-Gene	2013	?	?	4-wide	15	Yes		?	?	?		40	No	No	32 + 32 (per core; write-through w/parity)	256 KiB shared per core pair (with ECC)	8 MiB	8	4.2	?	
Applied Micro	X-Gene 2	2015	?	?	4-wide	15	Yes		?	?	?		28	No	No	32 + 32 (per core; write-through w/parity)	256 KiB shared per core pair (with ECC)	8 MiB	8	4.2	?	
Applied Micro	X-Gene 3	2017	?	?	?	?	?		?	?	?		16	No	No	?	?	32 MiB	32	?	?	
Qualcomm	Kryo	2015	ARMv8-A	?	?	?	Yes		Two-level?	"big" or "LITTLE"; Qualcomm's own similar implementation	?		14	No	No	32+24	0.5–1 MiB		2+2	6.3	?	
Qualcomm	Kryo 200	2016	ARMv8-A	?	2-wide	11–12	Yes; 7-wide dispatch		Two-level	big	7		14 / 11 / 10 / 6	No	No	64 + 32/64?	512 KiB/Gold Core	No	4	?	1.8–2.45 GHz	
Qualcomm	Kryo 200	2016	ARMv8-A	?	2-wide	8	No	0	Conditional+ Indirect branch prediction	LITTLE	2		14 / 11 / 10 / 6	No	No	8–64? + 8–64?	256 KiB/Silver Core	No	4	?	1.8–1.9 GHz	
Qualcomm	Kryo 300	2017	ARMv8.2-A	?	3-wide	11–13	Yes; 8-wide dispatch		Two-level	big	8		10	No	No	64+64	256 KiB/Gold Core	2 MiB	2, 4	?	2.0–2.95 GHz	
Qualcomm	Kryo 300	2017	ARMv8.2-A	?	2-wide	8	No	0	Conditional+ Indirect branch prediction	LITTLE	28		10	No	No	16–64? + 16–64?	128 KiB/Silver	2 MiB	4, 6	?	1.7–1.8 GHz	
Qualcomm	Kryo 400	2018	ARMv8.2-A	?	4-wide	11–13	Yes; 8-wide dispatch		Yes	big	8		11 / 8 / 7	No	No	64 + 64	512 KiB/Gold Prime 256 KiB/Gold	2 MiB	2, 1+1, 4, 1+3	?	2.0–2.96 GHz	
Qualcomm	Kryo 400	2018	ARMv8.2-A	?	2-wide	8	No	0	Conditional+ Indirect branch prediction	LITTLE	2		11 / 8 / 7	No	No	16–64? + 16–64?	128 KiB/Silver	2 MiB	4, 6	?	1.7–1.8 GHz	
Qualcomm	Kryo 500	2019	ARMv8.2-A	?	4-wide	11–13	Yes; 8-wide dispatch		Yes	big			8 / 7	No	?		512 KiB/Gold Prime 256 KiB/Gold	3 MiB	2, 1+3	?	2.0–3.2 GHz	
Qualcomm	Kryo 500	2019	ARMv8.2-A	?	2-wide	8	No	0	Conditional+ Indirect branch prediction	LITTLE	2		8 / 7	No	?		128 KiB/Silver	3 MiB	4, 6	?	1.7–1.8 GHz	
Qualcomm	Kryo 600	2020	ARMv8.4-A	?	4-wide	11–13	Yes; 8-wide dispatch		Yes	big			6 / 5	No	?	64 + 64	1024 KiB/Gold Prime 512 KiB/Gold	4 MiB	2, 1+3	?	2.2–3.0 GHz	
Qualcomm	Kryo 600	2020	ARMv8.4-A	?	2-wide	8	No	0	Conditional+ Indirect branch prediction	LITTLE	2		6 / 5	No	?		128 KiB/Silver	4 MiB	4, 6	?	1.7–1.8 GHz	
Qualcomm	Falkor	2017	"ARMv8.1-A features"	No	4-wide	10–15	Yes; 8-wide dispatch		Yes	?	8		10	No	24 KiB	88 + 32	500KiB	1.25MiB	40–48	?	?	
Samsung	M1	2016	ARMv8-A	?	4-wide	13	Yes; 9-wide dispatch	96		big	8		14	No	No	64 + 32	2 MiB	No	4	?	2.6 GHz	
Samsung	M2	2017	ARMv8-A	?	4-wide			100	Two-level	big			10	No	No	64 + 64	2 MiB	No	4	?	2.3 GHz	
Samsung	M3	2018	ARMv8.2-A	?	6-wide	15	Yes; 12-wide dispatch	228	Two-level	big	12		10	No	No	64 + 64	512 KiB per core	4096KB	4	?	2.7 GHz	
Samsung	M4	2019	ARMv8.2-A	?	6-wide	15	Yes; 12-wide dispatch	228	Two-level	big	12		8 / 7	No	No	64 + 64	512 KiB per core	3072KB	2	?	2.73 GHz	
Samsung	M5	2020	ARMv8.2-A	?	6-wide		Yes; 12-wide dispatch	228	Two-level	big			7	No	No	64 + 64	512 KiB per core	3072KB	2	?	2.73 GHz	
Fujitsu	A64FX	2019	ARMv8.2-A	?	4/2-wide	7+	Yes; 5-way?		Yes	—N/a	8+	2*512b	7	No	No	64 + 64	8MiB per 12+1 cores	No	48+4	?	1.9 GHz+	
HiSilicon	TaiShan V110	2019	ARMv8.2-A	?	4-wide	?	Yes			—N/a	8	7		No	No	64 + 64	512 KiB per core	1 MiB per core	?	?	?	
Company	Core	Released	Revision	32-bit support	Decode	Pipeline depth	Out-of-order execution		Branch prediction	big.LITTLE role	Exec. ports	SIMD	Fab (in nm)	Simult. MT	L0 cache	L1 cache Instr + Data (in KiB)	L2 cache	L3 cache	Core configurations	Speed per core (DMIPS/MHz)	Clock rate	ARM part number (in the main ID register)

== ARMv9-A ==
Company	Core	Released	Revision	32-bit support	Decode	Pipeline depth	Out-of-order execution		Branch prediction	big.LITTLE role	Exec. ports	SIMD	Fab (in nm)	Simult. MT	L0 cache	L1 cache Instr + Data (in KiB)	L2 cache	L3 cache	Core configurations	Speed per core (DMIPS/MHz)	Clock rate	ARM part number (in the main ID register)
Company	Core	Released	Revision	32-bit support	Decode	Pipeline depth	Have it	Entries	Branch prediction	big.LITTLE role	Exec. ports	SIMD	Fab (in nm)	Simult. MT	L0 cache	L1 cache Instr + Data (in KiB)	L2 cache	L3 cache	Core configurations	Speed per core (DMIPS/MHz)	Clock rate	ARM part number (in the main ID register)
ARM	Cortex-A510	May 2021	ARMv9-A	EL0 only (2022 refresh only)	3-wide	8 stages	No	N/A (does not support out-of-order execution)	Advanced techniques similar to larger cores, specifics not disclosed	LITTLE	2 execution ports	Yes	5nm	No	N/A	32 or 64 KB each	Configurable, typically 128 KB to 512 KB	N/A	Typically paired with Cortex-A710 in configurations (e.g., 1+3)	Not explicitly stated, but performance uplift of 35% over A55	Up to 2.85 GHz (varies by implementation)	0xD46
ARM	Cortex-A710	May 2021	ARMv9-A	EL0 only	4-wide	10 stages	Yes	160 entries	Enhanced with larger structures and better accuracy	big	13 execution ports	Yes	5nm	Yes	Not specified	64/128 KiB each	256/512 KiB	Optional, up to 16 MiB	Typically 1+3+4 (big.LITTLE)	Not specified in results	Up to 3.0 GHz (approx.)	0xD47
ARM	Cortex-A715	June 2022	ARMv9-A	No	5-wide	10 stages	Yes	160 entries	Advanced branch prediction capabilities	big	13 execution ports	Yes	4nm	Yes	Not specified	64 KiB each	1 MiB	16 MiB (in certain configurations)	1+3+4 or similar setups	Not specified, but designed for high efficiency	Up to 2.8 GHz	0xD4D
ARM	Cortex-X2	May 2021	ARMv9-A	No	5-wide	10 stages	Yes	288 entries	Advanced, with improved accuracy	big	15 execution ports	Yes	5nm	Yes	Not specified	64 KiB each	1 MiB	8 MiB	1+3+4 (X2+A710+A510)	Not specified	Up to 3.2 GHz	0xD48
ARM	Cortex-X3	June 2022	ARMv9-A	No	6-wide	9 stages	Yes	320 entries	Advanced branch prediction capabilities	big	15 execution ports	Yes	4nm	Yes	Not specified	64 KiB each	1 MiB	16 MiB	1+3+4 or up to 8+4	Not specified	Up to 3.6 GHz	0xD4E

== See also ==
- AArch64
- List of ARM processors
- List of products using ARM processors
- Microarchitecture
