= ARM Cortex-X1 =

Microprocessor core model by ARM

General information
- Launched: 2020
- Designed by: ARM Ltd.

Performance
- Max. CPU clock rate: to 3.0 GHz in phones and 3.3 GHz in tablets/laptops
- Address width: 40-bit

Physical specifications
- Cores: 1–4 per cluster

Cache
- L1 cache: 128 KiB (64 KiB I-cache with parity, 64 KiB D-cache) per core
- L2 cache: 512–1024 KiB per core
- L3 cache: 512 KiB – 8 MiB (optional)

Architecture and classification
- Microarchitecture: ARM Cortex-X1
- Instruction set: ARMv8-A: A64, A32, and T32 (at the EL0 only)
- Extensions: ARMv8.1-A, ARMv8.2-A, cryptography, RAS, ARMv8.3-A LDAPR instructions, ARMv8.4-A dot product

Products, models, variants
- Product code name: Hera
- Variant: ARM Cortex-A78, ARM Neoverse V1

History
- Successor: ARM Cortex-X2

The ARM Cortex-X1 is a central processing unit implementing the ARMv8.2-A 64-bit instruction set designed by ARM Holdings' Austin design centre as part of ARM's Cortex-X Custom (CXC) program.

== Design ==
The Cortex-X1 design is based on the ARM Cortex-A78, but redesigned for purely performance instead of a balance of performance, power, and area (PPA).

The Cortex-X1 is a 5-wide decode out-of-order superscalar design with a 3K macro-OP (MOPs) cache. It can fetch 5 instructions and 8 MOPs per cycle, and rename and dispatch 8 MOPs, and 16 μOPs per cycle. The out-of-order window size has been increased to 224 entries. The backend has 15 execution ports with a pipeline depth of 13 stages and the execution latencies consists of 10 stages. It also features 4x128b SIMD units.

ARM claims the Cortex-X1 offers 30% faster integer and 100% faster machine learning performance than the ARM Cortex-A77.

The Cortex-X1 supports ARM's DynamIQ technology, expected to be used as high-performance cores when used in combination with the ARM Cortex-A78 mid and ARM Cortex-A55 little cores.

== Architecture changes in comparison with ARM Cortex-A78 ==
- Around 20% performance improvement (+30% from A77)
  - 30% faster integer
  - 100% faster machine learning performance
- Out-of-order window size has been increased to 224 entries (from 160 entries)
- Up to 4x128b SIMD units (from 2x128b)
- 15% more silicon area
- 5-way decode (from 4-way)
- 8 MOPs/cycle decoded cache bandwidth (from 6 MOPs/cycle)
- 64 KB L1D + 64 KB L1I (from 32/64 KB L1)
- Up to 1 MB/core L2 cache (from 512 KB/core max)
- Up to 8 MB L3 cache (from 4 MB max)

== Licensing ==
The Cortex-X1 is available as SIP core to partners of their Cortex-X Custom (CXC) program, and its design makes it suitable for integration with other SIP cores (e.g. GPU, display controller, DSP, image processor, etc.) into one die constituting a system on a chip (SoC).

== Usage ==
- Samsung Exynos 2100
- Qualcomm Snapdragon 888(+)
- Google Tensor

== See also ==
- ARM Cortex-A78, related high performance microarchitecture
- ARM Neoverse V1 (Zeus), server sister core to the Cortex-X1
- Comparison of ARMv8-A cores, ARMv8 family
