= Glossary of computer hardware terms =

This glossary of computer hardware terms is a list of definitions of terms and concepts related to computer hardware, i.e. the physical and structural components of computers, architectural issues, and peripheral devices.

== A ==
Accelerated Graphics Port (AGP)
A dedicated video bus standard introduced by INTEL enabling 3D graphics capabilities; commonly present on an AGP slot on the motherboard. (Presently a historical expansion card standard, designed for attaching a video card to a computer's motherboard (and considered high-speed at launch, one of the last off-chip parallel communication standards), primarily to assist in the acceleration of 3D computer graphics). Has largely been replaced by PCI Express since the mid 2000s.
accelerator
A microprocessor, ASIC, or expansion card designed to offload a specific task from the CPU, often containing fixed-function hardware. A common example is a graphics processing unit.
accumulator
A register that holds the result of previous operation in ALU. It can be also used as an input register to the adder.
address
The unique integer number that identifies a memory location or an input/output port in an address space.
address space
A mapping of logical addresses into physical memory or other memory-mapped devices.
Advanced Technology eXtended (ATX)
A motherboard form factor specification developed by Intel in 1995 to improve on previous DE factor standards like the AT form factor.
AI accelerator
An accelerator aimed at running artificial neural networks or other machine learning and machine vision algorithms (either training or deployment), e.g. Movidius Myriad 2, TrueNorth, Tensor Processing Unit (TPU), etc.
Advanced Configuration and Power Interface
An open standard for operating systems to discover, configure, manage, and monitor status of the hardware.

== B ==
Blu-ray Disc (BD)
An optical disc storage medium designed to supersede the DVD format. Blu-ray Disc is capable of storing about 5 times as much data as a standard DVD. Most computers do not come shipped with Blu-ray drives, however they can be purchased and added as a separate upgrade. Blu-ray won a format war against HD DVD and for a time drives offering both formats were sold.
bus
A common path shared by multiple subsystems or components to send / receive signals. It is a low cost option in mini and micro computers compared to multiple dedicated non-shared paths in main frame computers.
Bottleneck
An occurrence where a certain component compromises the way another component works.

== C ==
cache
A small and fast buffer memory between the CPU and the main memory. Reduces access time for frequently accessed items (instructions / operands).
cache coherency
The process of keeping data in multiple caches synchronised in a multiprocessor shared memory system, also required when DMA modifies the underlying memory.
cache eviction
Freeing up data from within a cache to make room for new cache entries to be allocated; controlled by a cache replacement policy. Caused by a cache miss whilst a cache is already full.
cache hit
Finding data in a local cache, preventing the need to search for that resource in a more distant location (or to repeat a calculation).
cache line
A small block of memory within a cache; the granularity of allocation, refills, eviction; typically 32–128 bytes in size.
cache miss
Not finding data in a local cache, requiring use of the cache policy to allocate and fill this data, and possibly performing evicting other data to make room.
cache thrashing
A pathological situation where access in a cache cause cyclical cache misses by evicting data that is needed in the near future.
cache ways
The number of potential cache lines in an associative cache that specific physical addresses can be mapped to; higher values reduce potential collisions in allocation.
cache-only memory architecture (COMA)
A multiprocessor memory architecture where an address space is dynamically shifted between processor nodes based on demand.
card reader
Any data input device that reads data from a card-shaped storage medium such as a memory card.
channel I/O
A generic term that refers to a high-performance input/output (I/O) architecture that is implemented in various forms on a number of computer architectures, especially on mainframe computers.
chipset

A group of integrated circuits, or chips, that are designed to work together. They are usually marketed as a single product.
Compact Disc-Recordable (CD-R)
A variation of the optical compact disc which can be written to once.
Compact Disc-ReWritable (CD-RW)
A variation of the optical compact disc which can be written to many times.
Compact Disc Read-Only Memory (CD-ROM)
A pre-pressed compact disc which contains data or music playback and which cannot be written to.
computer case

The enclosure that contains most of the components of a computer, usually excluding the display, keyboard, mouse, and various other peripherals.
computer fan
An active cooling system forcing airflow inside or around a computer case using a fan to cause air cooling.

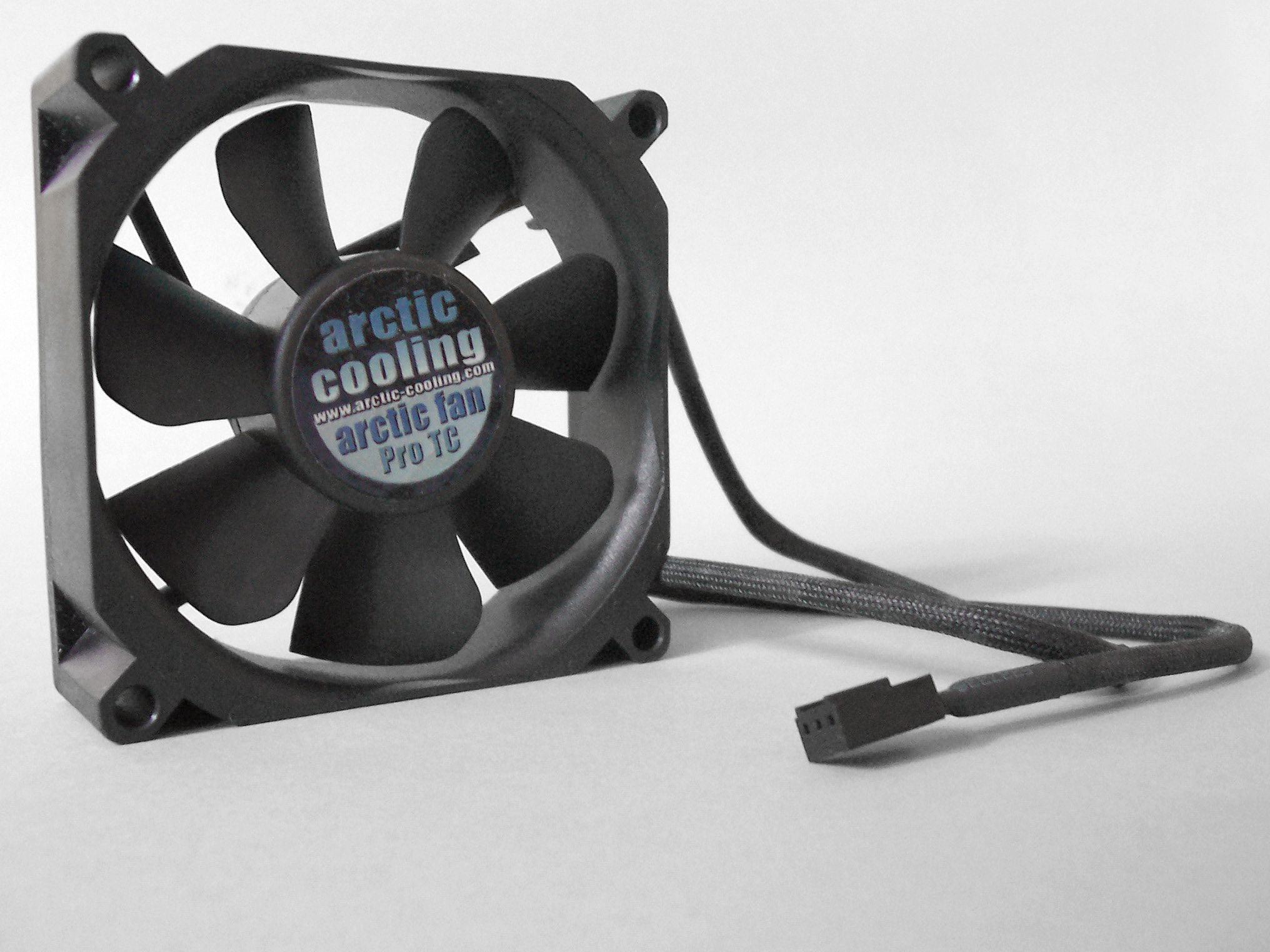
An 80×80×25 mm computer fan

computer form factor
The name used to denote the dimensions, power supply type, location of mounting holes, number of ports on the back panel, etc.
control store
The memory that stores the microcode of a CPU.
Conventional Peripheral Component Interconnect (Conventional PCI)

A computer bus for attaching hardware devices in a computer.
core
The portion of the CPU which actually performs arithmetic and logical operations; nearly all CPUs produced since the late 2000s decade have multiple cores (e.g. "a quad-core processor").
core memory
In modern usage, a synonym for main memory, dating back from the pre-semiconductor-chip times when the dominant main memory technology was magnetic core memory.
Central Processing Unit (CPU)
The portion of a computer system that executes the instructions of a computer program.

== D ==
data cache (D-cache)
A cache in a CPU or GPU servicing data load and store requests, mirroring main memory (or VRAM for a GPU).
data storage
A technology consisting of computer components and recording media used to retain digital data. It is a core function and fundamental component of computers.
device memory
local memory associated with a hardware device such as a graphics processing unit or OpenCL compute device, distinct from main memory.
Digital Video Disc (DVD)

An optical compact disc – of the same dimensions as compact discs (CDs), but store more than six times as much data. Primarily used for storing movies and computer games, however, the rise of services such as Steam have largely rendered physical game discs obsolete.
Digital Visual Interface (DVI)
A video display interface developed by the Digital Display Working Group (DDWG). The digital interface is used to connect a video source to a display device, such as a computer monitor.
Direct Access Storage Device (DASD)
A mainframe terminology introduced by IBM denoting secondary storage with random access, typically (arrays of) hard disk drives.
direct mapped cache
A cache where each physical address may only be mapped to one cache line, indexed using the low bits of the address. Simple but highly prone to allocation conflicts.
direct memory access (DMA)
The ability of a hardware device such as a disk drive or network interface controller to access main memory without intervention from the CPU, provided by one or more DMA channels in a system.
DisplayPort
A digital display interface developed by the Video Electronics Standards Association (VESA). The interface is primarily used to connect a video source to a display device such as a computer monitor, though it can also be used to transmit audio, USB, and other forms of data. Unlike HDMI, DisplayPort is open source.
drive bay
A standard-sized area within a computer case for adding hardware (hard drives, CD drives, etc.) to a computer.
dual in-line memory module (DIMM)
A series of dynamic random-access memory integrated circuits. These modules are mounted on a printed circuit board and designed for use in personal computers, workstations and servers. Contrast SIMM.
dual issue
A superscalar pipeline capable of executing two instructions simultaneously.
dynamic random-access memory (DRAM)
A type of random-access memory that stores each bit of data in a separate capacitor within an integrated circuit and which must be periodically refreshed to retain the stored data.

== E ==
expansion bus
A computer bus which moves information between the internal hardware of a computer system (including the CPU and RAM) and peripheral devices. It is a collection of wires and protocols that allows for the expansion of a computer.
expansion card
A printed circuit board that can be inserted into an electrical connector or expansion slot on a computer motherboard, backplane, or riser card to add functionality to a computer system via an expansion bus.

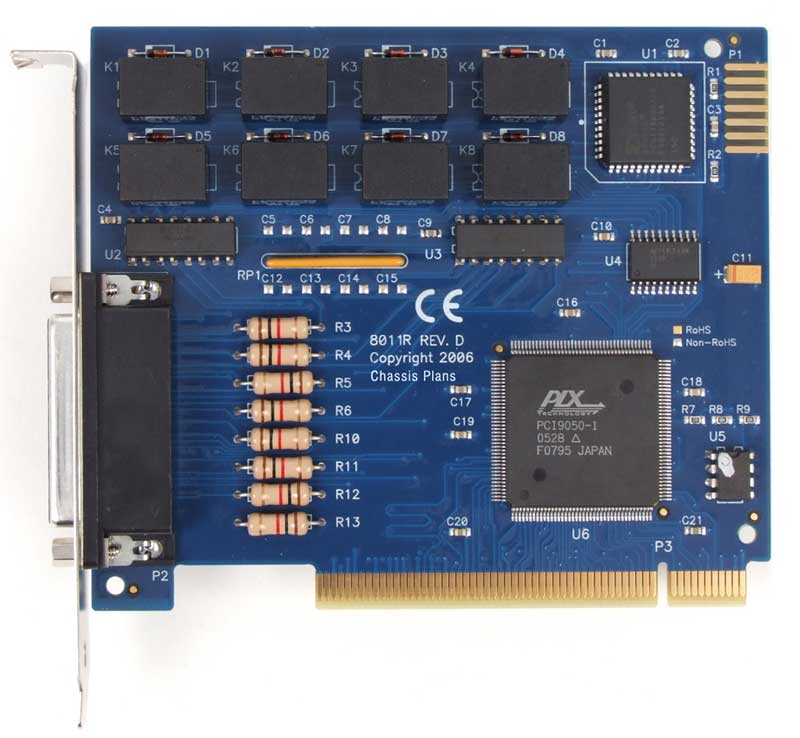
A PCI digital I/O expansion card

== F ==
firewall
Any hardware device or software program designed to protect a computer from viruses, trojans, malware, etc.
firmware
Fixed programs and data that internally control various electronic devices.
flash memory
A type of non-volatile computer storage chip that can be electrically erased and reprogrammed.
floppy disk
A data storage medium that is composed of a disk of thin, flexible ("floppy") magnetic storage medium encased in a square or rectangular plastic shell. Historically floppy disks came in 8-inch, 5.25-inch, and 3.5-inch sizes, with the latter being by far the most ubiquitous.
floppy disk drive
A device for reading floppy disks. These were common on computers made prior to 2010.
floppy-disk controller
A specific area on the motherboard which can be used to connect a floppy disk drive to it.
free and open-source graphics device driver

== G ==
graphics hardware
Graphics Processing Unit (GPU)
A specialized processor designed for the purpose of creating images and animations and displaying them on a computer screen, independent of the CPU and onboard video memory.

== H ==
hard disk drive (HDD)
Any non-volatile storage device that stores data on rapidly rotating rigid (i.e. hard) platters with magnetic surfaces.
hardware
The physical components of a computer system.
Harvard architecture
A memory architecture where program machine code and data are held in separate memories, more commonly seen in microcontrollers and digital signal processors.
High-Definition Multimedia Interface (HDMI)
A compact interface for transferring encrypted uncompressed digital audio and video data to a device such as a computer monitor, video projector or digital television. Motherboard and graphics card manufacturers must pay a licensing fee to incorporate HDMI into their products.

== I ==
input device
Any peripheral equipment used to provide data and control signals to an information processing system.
input/output (I/O)
The communication between an information processing system (such as a computer), and the outside world.
Input/Output Operations Per Second (IOPS)
A common performance measurement used to benchmark computer storage devices like hard disk drives.
instruction
A group of several bits in a computer program that contains an operation code and usually one or more memory addresses.
instruction cache
I-cache
A cache in a CPU or GPU servicing instruction fetch requests for program code (or shaders for a GPU), possibly implementing modified Harvard architecture if program machine code is stored in the same address space and physical memory as data.
instruction fetch
A stage in a pipeline that loads the next instruction referred to by the program counter.
integrated circuit

A miniaturised electronic circuit that has been manufactured in the surface of a thin substrate of semiconductor material.
interrupt
A condition related to the state of the hardware that may be signaled by an external hardware device.

== J ==
jump drive
Another name for a USB flash drive.

== K ==
keyboard
An input device, partially modeled after the typewriter keyboard, which uses an arrangement of buttons or keys to act as mechanical levers or electronic switches.

== L ==
load/store instructions
instructions used to transfer data between memory and processor registers.
load–store architecture
An instruction set architecture where arithmetic/logic instructions may only be performed between processor registers, relying on separate load/store instructions for all data transfers.
local memory
memory associated closely with a processing element, e.g. a cache, scratchpad, the memory connected to one processor node in a NUMA or COMA system, or device memory (such as VRAM) in an accelerator.

== M ==
magneto-optical drive
mainframe computer
An especially powerful computer used mainly by large organizations for bulk data processing such as census, industry and consumer statistics, enterprise resource planning, and financial transaction processing.
main memory
The largest random-access memory in a memory hierarchy (before offline storage) in a computer system. Main memory usually consists of DRAM, and is distinct from caches and scratchpads.
mask ROM
A type of read-only memory (ROM) whose contents are programmed by the integrated circuit manufacturer.
memory
Devices that are used to store data or programs on a temporary or permanent basis for use in an electronic digital computer.
memory access pattern
The pattern with which software or some other system (such as an accelerator or DMA channel) accesses, reads, and writes memory on secondary storage. These patterns have implications for locality of reference, parallelism, and the distribution of workload in shared memory systems.
memory address
The address of a location in a memory or other address space.
memory architecture
A memory architecture in a computer system, e.g. NUMA, uniform memory access, COMA, etc.
memory card
A small electronic data storage device consisting of a flat piece of plastic no larger than a thumbnail that can be inserted into a special socket in a computer or a portable electronic device such as a camera or a cell phone in order to provide instant access to removable memory, typically flash memory.

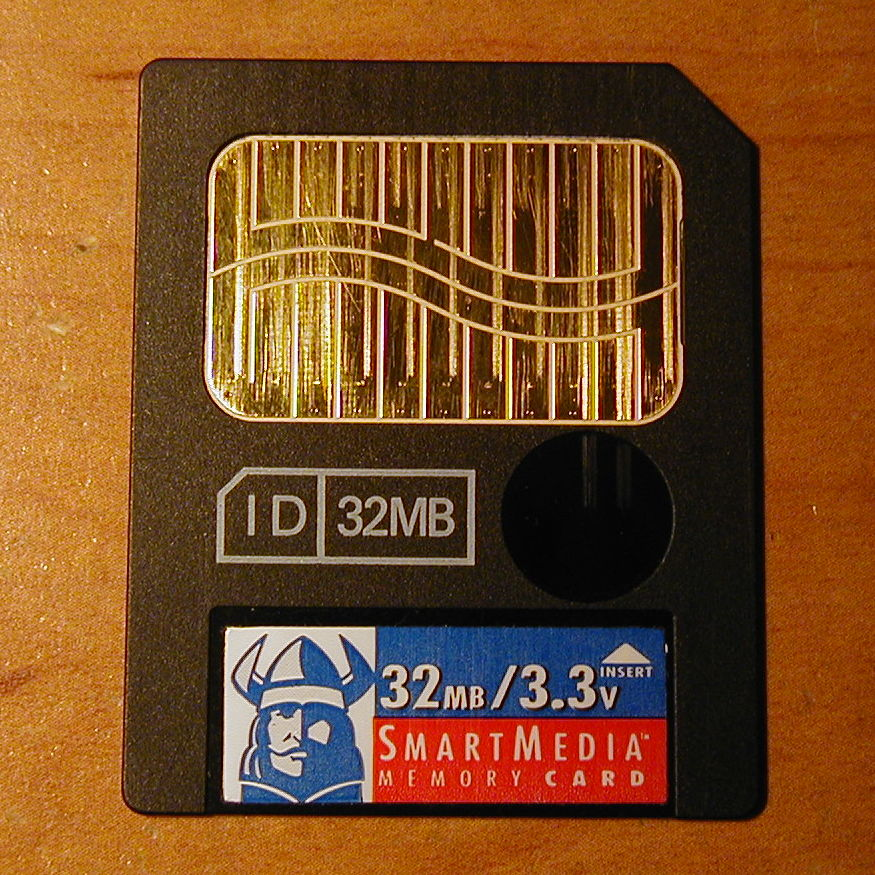
A typical portable memory card providing 32 megabytes of storage space

mini-VGA
Small connectors used on some laptops and other systems in place of the standard VGA connector.
microcode
A layer of hardware-level instructions involved in the implementation of higher level machine code instructions in many computers and other processors.
modem
A device that enables two distant computer systems to communicate with one another. In the past, modems connected to a phone line, however, since the mid 2000s broadband modems have been the predominant type seen.
modified Harvard architecture
A variation of Harvard architecture used for most CPUs with separate non-coherent instruction and data caches (assuming that code is immutable), but still mirroring the same main memory address space, and possibly sharing higher levels of the same cache hierarchy.
monitor
An electronic visual display for computers. A monitor usually comprises the display device, circuitry, casing, and power supply. The display device in modern monitors is typically a thin film transistor liquid crystal display (TFT-LCD) or a flat panel LED display, whereas older monitors used a cathode ray tube (CRT).

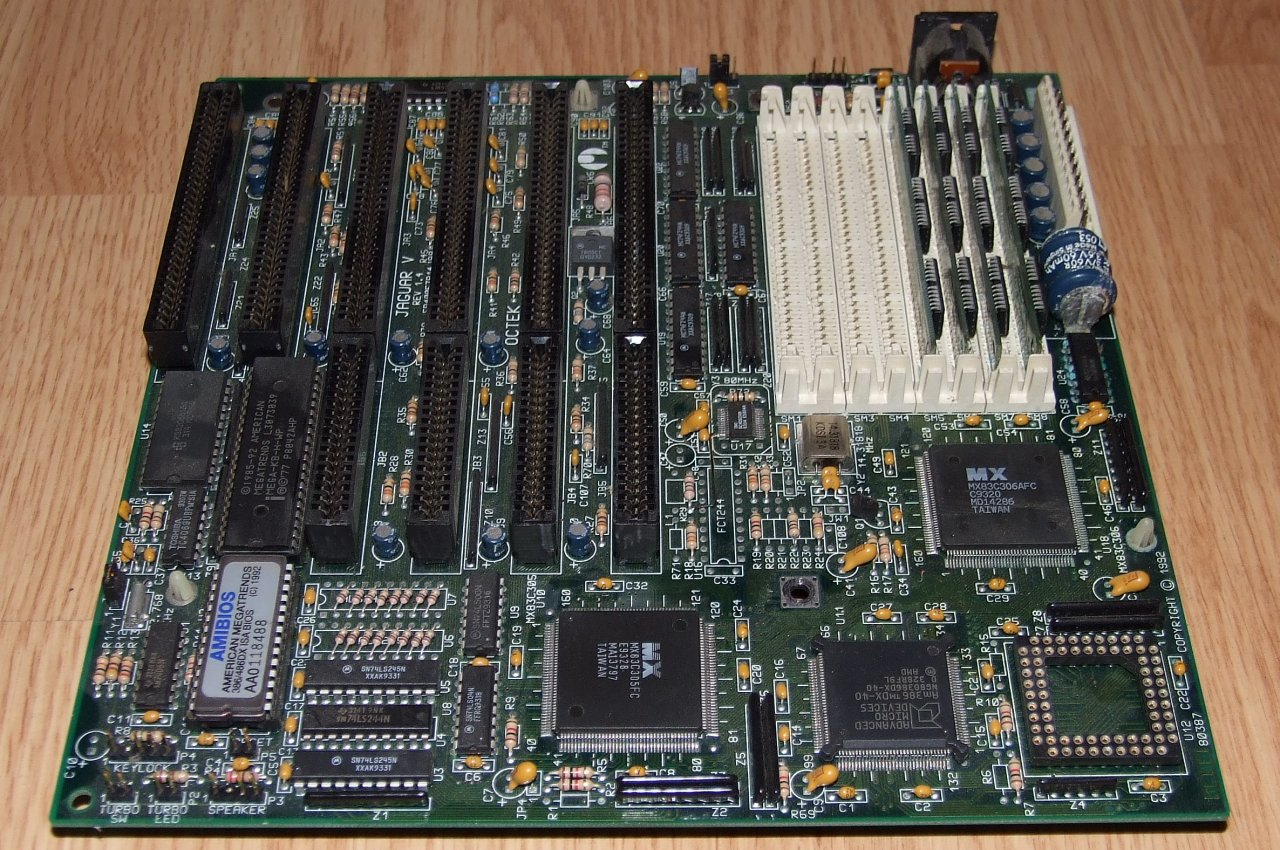
The Octek Jaguar V motherboard from 1993

motherboard
The central printed circuit board (PCB) in many modern computers which provides a physical platform for attaching and arranging many of the crucial components of the system, usually while also providing connection space for peripherals.
mouse
A pointing device that functions by detecting two-dimensional motion relative to its supporting surface; motion is usually mapped to a cursor in screen space; typically used to control a graphical user interface on a desktop computer or for CAD, etc.

== N ==
network
A collection of computers and other devices connected by communications channels, e.g. by Ethernet or wireless networking.
network interface controller

network on a chip (NOC)
A computer network on a single semiconductor chip, connecting processing elements, fixed-function hardware, or even memories and caches. Increasingly common in system on a chip designs.
non-uniform memory access (NUMA)
non-volatile memory
memory that can retain the stored data even when not powered, as opposed to volatile memory.
non-volatile random-access memory
Random-access memory (RAM) that retains its data when power is turned off.

== O ==
operating system
The set of software that manages computer hardware resources and provides common services for computer programs, typically loaded by the BIOS on booting.
operation code
Several bits in a computer program instruction that specify which operation to perform.
optical disc drive
A type of disk drive that uses laser light or electromagnetic waves near the light spectrum as part of the process of reading or writing data to or from optical discs.

== P ==
pen drive
Another name for a USB flash drive.
pentest
Another name for a penetration test.
peripheral
Any device attached to a computer but not part of it.
Peripheral Component Interconnect (PCI)
a local computer bus for attaching hardware devices in a computer and which is part of the PCI Local Bus standard
personal computer (PC)
Any general-purpose computer whose size, capabilities, and original sales price make it useful for individuals, and which is intended to be operated directly by an end user, with no intervening computer operator.
power supply
A unit of the computer that converts mains AC to low-voltage regulated DC for the power of all the computer components.
power supply unit (PSU)
Converts mains AC to low-voltage regulated DC power for the internal components of a computer. Modern personal computers universally use switched-mode power supplies. Some power supplies have a manual switch for selecting input voltage, while others automatically adapt to the mains voltage.
prefetch
The process of pre-loading instructions or data into a cache ahead of time, either under manual control via prefetch instructions or automatically by a prefetch unit which may use runtime heuristics to predict the future memory access pattern.
prefetching
The pre-loading of instructions or data before either is needed by dedicated cache control instructions or predictive hardware, to mitigate latency.
printer
A peripheral which produces a text or graphics of documents stored in electronic form, usually on physical print media such as paper or transparencies. The two most common types of printers available are inkjet, which uses ink cartridges, and laser, which uses toner.
process node
Refers to a level of semiconductor manufacturing technology, one of several successive transistor shrinks.
processing element
An electronic circuit (either a microprocessor or an internal component of one) that may function autonomously or under external control, performing arithmetic and logic operations on data, possibly containing local memory, and possibly connected to other processing elements via a network, network on a chip, or cache hierarchy.
processor node
A processor in a multiprocessor system or cluster, connected by dedicated communication channels or a network.
programmable read-only memory (PROM)
A type of non-volatile memory chip that may be programmed after the device is constructed.
programmer
Any electronic equipment that arranges written software to configure programmable non-volatile integrated circuits (called programmable devices) such as EPROMs, EEPROMs, Flashes, eMMC, MRAM, FRAM, NV RAM, PALs, FPGAs or programmable logic circuits.
PCI Express (PCIe)
An expansion bus standard designed to replace the older PCI, PCI-X, and AGP bus standards.
PCI-eXtended (PCI-X)
An expansion bus and expansion card standard that enhances the 32-bit PCI Local Bus for higher bandwidth demanded by servers.

== R ==
Redundant Array of Independent Disks (RAID)
Any of various data storage schemes that can divide and replicate data across multiple hard disk drives in order to increase reliability, allow faster access, or both.
random-access memory (RAM)
A type of computer data storage that allows data items to be accessed (read or written) in almost the same amount of time irrespective of the physical location of data inside the memory. RAM contains multiplexing and demultiplexing circuitry to connect the data lines to the addressed storage for reading or writing the entry. Usually, more than one bit of storage is accessed by the same address, and RAM devices often have multiple data lines and are said to be '8-bit' or '16-bit' etc. devices. In today's technology, random-access memory takes the form of integrated circuits.
read-only memory (ROM)
A type of memory chip that retains its data when its power supply is switched off.

== S ==
server
A computer which may be used to provide services to clients.
software
Any computer program or other kind of information that can be read and/or written by a computer.
single in-line memory module (SIMM)
A type of memory module containing random-access memory used in computers from the early 1980s to the late 1990s. Contrast DIMM.
solid-state drive

Any data storage device that uses integrated circuit assemblies as memory to store data persistently. Though they are sometimes referred to as solid-state disks, these devices contain neither an actual disk nor a drive motor to spin a disk. On average, solid-state drives cost about four times as much as conventional hard drives of the same capacity, but can provide significantly faster boot times.

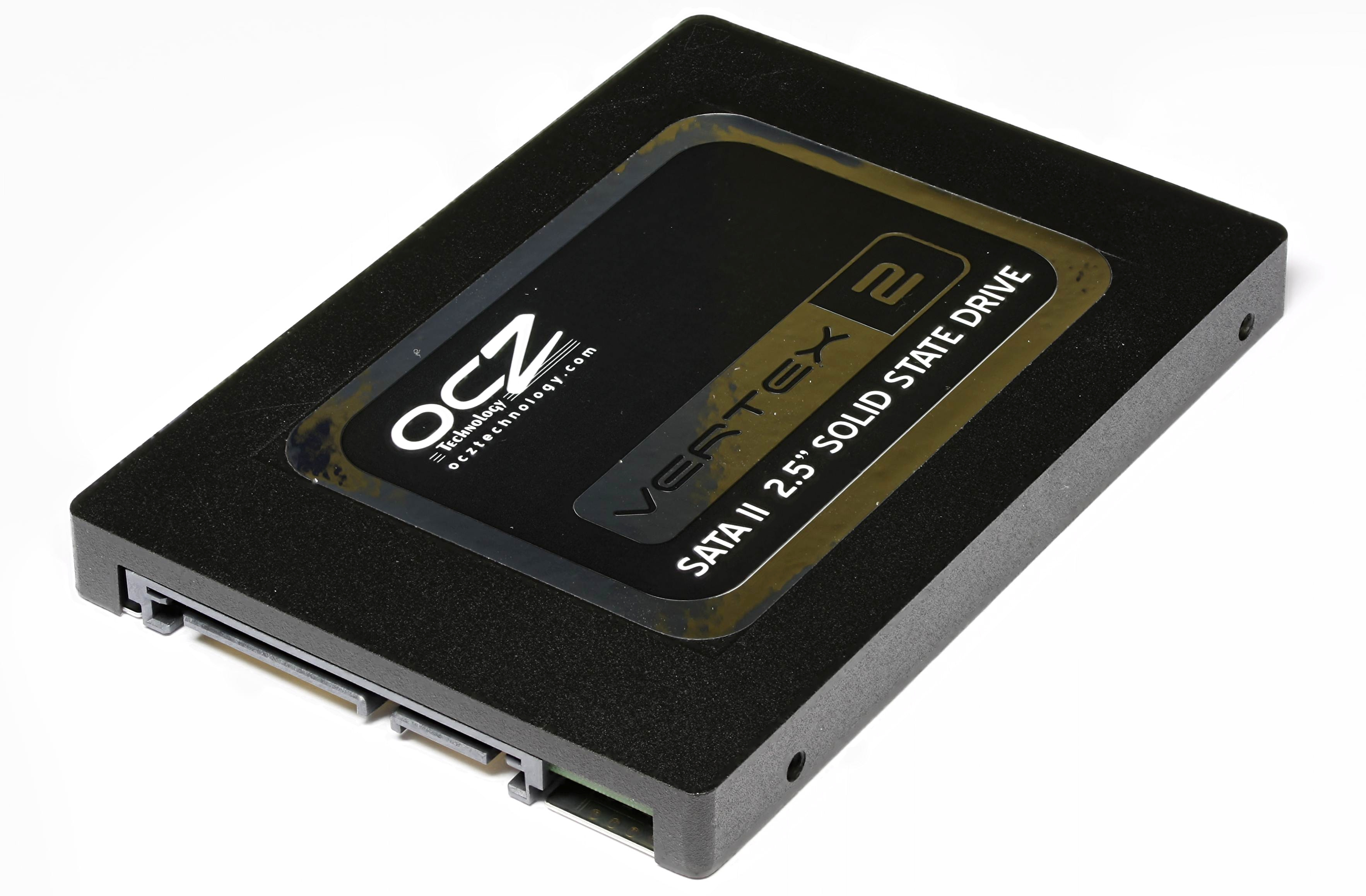
A 2.5-inch solid-state drive that can be used in laptops and desktop computers

static random-access memory (SRAM)
A type of semiconductor memory that uses bistable latching circuitry to store each bit. The term static differentiates it from DRAM, which must be periodically refreshed.
sound card

An internal expansion card that facilitates economical input and output of audio signals to and from a computer under control of computer programs.
storage device
synchronous dynamic random-access memory (SDRAM)
A type of dynamic random access memory that is synchronized with the system bus.
SuperDisk
A high-speed, high-capacity alternative to the 90 mm (3.5 in), 1.44 MB floppy disk. The SuperDisk hardware was created by 3M's storage products group Imation in 1997.
Serial ATA (SATA)

A computer bus interface that connects host bus adapters to mass storage devices such as hard disk drives, optical drives, and solid-state drives.

== T ==
tape drive
A peripheral storage device that allows only sequential access, typically using magnetic tape.
task manager
terminal
An electronic or electromechanical hardware device that is used for entering data into, and displaying data from, a computer or a computing system.
touchpad

A pointing device consisting of specialized surface that can translate the motion and position of a user's fingers or a stylus to a relative position on a screen.
TV tuner card
A card that allows the user to view television channels on a computer using an antenna. It can also be used to connect devices such as video game consoles, videocassette recorders, and LaserDisc players, if necessary.

== U ==
Universal Serial Bus (USB)
A specification to establish communication between devices and a host controller (usually a personal computer). The USB standard was first finalized in 1996, and has undergone many revisions since then, enabling faster data transfer speeds.
uop cache
A cache of decoded micro-operations in a CISC processor (e.g x86).
USB 1.x
The first revision of USB, which was capable of transferring up to 12 Mbit/s (megabits per second).
USB 2.0
The second revision of USB, introduced in 2000. It significantly increased the maximum transfer rate to 480 Mbit/s.
USB 3.0
The third revision of USB, introduced in 2008. It provides transfer rates of up to 5 Gbit/s (gigabits per second), more than 10 times faster than USB 2.0.
USB flash drive
A flash memory device integrated with a USB interface. USB flash drives are typically removable and rewritable.

== V ==
video card

An expansion card which generates a feed of output images to a display (such as a computer monitor).
Video Graphics Array (VGA)
First released in 1987, this was the last graphical standard introduced by IBM to which the majority of PC clone manufacturers conformed. Today, it has largely been supplanted by DisplayPort and HDMI, however, it can still be found as an integrated graphics option in some motherboards.
volatile memory
Memory that requires power to maintain the stored information, as opposed to non-volatile memory. Sticks of RAM are an example of volatile memory.

== W ==
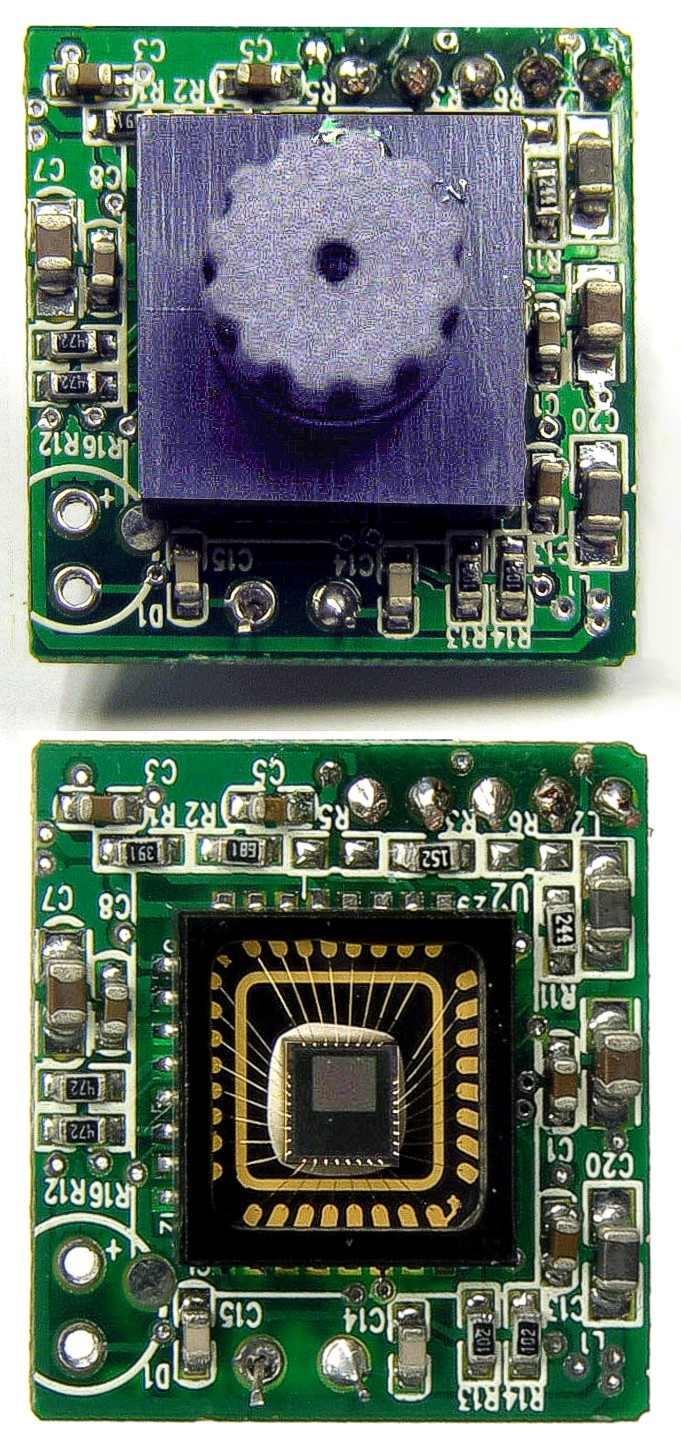
A webcam typically includes a lens (shown at top), an image sensor (shown at bottom), and supporting circuitry.

webcam
A video camera that feeds its images in real time to a computer or computer network, often via USB, Ethernet, or Wi-Fi.
write-back cache
A cache where store operations are buffered in cache lines, only reaching main memory when the entire cache line is evicted.
write-through cache
A cache where store operations are immediately written to the underlying main memory.
working set
The set of data used by a processor during a certain time interval, which should ideally fit into a CPU cache for optimum performance.

== Z ==
zip drive
The Zip drive is a removable floppy disk storage system that was introduced by Iomega in late 1994. Considered medium-to-high-capacity at the time of its release, Zip disks were originally launched with capacities of 100 MB.

== See also ==
- List of computer term etymologies
- Glossary of backup terms
- Glossary of computer graphics
- Glossary of computer science
- Glossary of computer software terms
- Glossary of energy efficient hardware/software
- Glossary of Internet-related terms
- Glossary of reconfigurable computing
