= Realme 8 =

2021 Android-based smartphone series manufactured by Realme

realme 8 realme 8 Pro realme 8i/narzo 50
- Developer: Realme
- Manufacturer: OPPO Electronics
- Type: Smartphone
- Series: Number series, narzo
- First released: 8/Pro: March 24, 2021; 5 years ago 8i: September 9, 2021; 4 years ago narzo 50: February 24, 2022; 4 years ago
- Availability by region: realme 8: List: March 24, 2021: India; April 8, 2021: Poland; April 26, 2021: Bangladesh; May 4, 2021: Pakistan Thailand; May 8, 2021: Vietnam; May 12, 2021: Philippines United Kingdom Italy Spain; June 1, 2021: Egypt; June 15, 2021: Russia Saudi Arabia United Arab Emirates; June 22, 2021: Myanmar; August 2, 2021: Ukraine; August 20, 2021: Nepal; realme 8 Pro: List: March 24, 2021: India; March 31, 2021: United Kingdom Italy Spain; April 10, 2021: Bangladesh; April 13, 2021: Czech Republic; April 17, 2021: Indonesia; May 1, 2021: Malaysia; May 4, 2021: Pakistan Thailand; May 12, 2021: Philippines; May 15, 2021: Vietnam; June 1, 2021: Egypt; June 11, 2021: Nepal; June 15, 2021: Russia Saudi Arabia United Arab Emirates; June 24, 2021: Brazil Mexico; realme 8i: List: September 14, 2021: India Malaysia; October 13, 2021: Bangladesh; October 14, 2021: United Kingdom Italy Spain; October 21, 2021: Vietnam; October 27, 2021: Nepal; November 2, 2021: Russia; November 12, 2021: Pakistan; November 17, 2021: Philippines; November 25, 2021: Indonesia; December 15, 2021: Mexico; December 20, 2021: Kenya; narzo 50: List: February 24, 2022: India; April 3, 2022: Bangladesh; May 18, 2022: Philippines
- Predecessor: Realme 7 Realme Narzo 30; Realme 7 Pro; Realme 7i
- Successor: Realme 9 Realme Narzo 60; Realme 9 Pro; Realme 9i
- Related: Realme 8 5G; Realme Narzo 50 5G; Realme Narzo 50 Pro realme narzo 50A realme narzo 50A Prime realme narzo 50i realme narzo 50i Prime
- Compatible networks: GSM, 3G, 4G (LTE)
- Form factor: Slate
- Colors: realme 8: Cyber Silver, Cyber Black; realme 8 Pro: Infinite Blue, Infinite Black, Punk Black, Illuminating Yellow; realme 8i: Space Black, Space Purple; Narzo 50: Speed Blue, Speed Black
- Dimensions: 8: 160.6 × 73.9 × 7.99 mm 8 Pro: 160.6 × 73.9 × 8.1 mm 8i/narzo 50: 164.1 × 75.5 × 8.5 mm
- Weight: 8: 177 g 8 Pro: 176 g 8i/narzo 50: 194 g
- Operating system: Original: Android 11 with realme UI 2.0; Current: Android 13 with realme UI 4.0
- System-on-chip: 8: MediaTek Helio G95 (12 nm); 8 Pro: Qualcomm Snapdragon 720G (8 nm); 8i/narzo 50: MediaTek Helio G96 (12 nm)
- CPU: 8/8i/narzo 50: Octa-core (2× 2.05 GHz Cortex-A76 & 6× 2 GHz Cortex-A55); 8 Pro: Octa-core (2× 2.3 GHz Kryo 465 Gold & 6× 1.8 GHz Kryo 465 Silver)
- GPU: 8: Mali-G76 MC4; 8 Pro: Adreno 618; 8i/narzo 50: Mali-G57 MC2
- Memory: 8: 4/6/8 GB; 8 Pro: 6/8 GB; 8i/narzo 50: 4/6 GB; LPDDR4X
- Storage: 8/8i/narzo 50: 64/128 GB; 8 Pro: 128 GB; UFS 2.1
- Removable storage: microSDXC up to 256 GB
- Battery: All models: Non-removable Li-Po; 8/8i/narzo 50: 5000 mAh; 8 Pro: 4500 mAh
- Charging: 8: 30W Fast Charging (Dart Charge); 8 Pro: 50W Fast Charging (SuperDart Charge); 8i/narzo 50: 18W Fast Charging
- Rear camera: Wide: 8: 64 MP Sony IMX682, f/1.8, 26 mm, 1/1.73", 0.8 µm, PDAF; 8 Pro: 108 MP Samsung ISOCELL HM2, f/1.9, 26 mm, 1/1.52", 0.7 µm, PDAF; 8i/narzo 50: 50 MP Samsung ISOCELL S5KJN1, f/1.8, 26 mm, 1/2.76", 0.64 µm, PDAF; Ultrawide: 8/Pro: 8 MP, f/2.3, 119°, 16 mm, 1/4", 1.12 µm; 8i/narzo 50: No; Macro: 2 MP, f/2.4 Depth: 2 MP, f/2.4 Video: 8: 4K@30fps, 1080p@30/60/120fps, gyro-EIS; 8 Pro: 4K@30fps, 1080p@30/60/120/480fps, 720p@960fps, gyro-EIS; 8i: 1080p@30fps; Other: LED flash, HDR, panorama
- Front camera: 8/Pro: 16 MP, f/2.5 (wide), 1/3", 1 µm 8i/narzo 50: 16 MP, f/2.1 (wide), 1/3", 1 µm HDR, panorama 1080p@30/120fps (8/Pro) / 480 (8 Pro) fps, 720p@960fps (8 Pro), gyro-EIS
- Display: 8/Pro: Super AMOLED, 6.4", 2400 × 1080 (FHD+), 20:9, 409 ppi 8i/narzo 50: IPS LCD, 120 Hz, 6.6", 2412 × 1080 (FHD+), 20:9, 400 ppi
- Sound: Loudspeaker, 3.5mm audio jack
- Connectivity: USB-C 2.0, 3.5 mm Audio, Bluetooth 5.0 (8 Pro) / 5.1 (A2DP, LE), NFC (except narzo 50), Wi-Fi 802.11 a/b/g/n/ac (dual-band, Wi-Fi Direct), GPS (A-GPS), GLONASS, BeiDou
- Data inputs: Touchscreen (multi-touch), 2 microphones (8/Pro) / 1 microphone (8i/narzo 50), fingerprint scanner (under-display optical on 8/Pro; side-mounted on 8i/narzo 50), accelerometer, gyroscope, proximity sensor, compass
- Codename: 8i/narzo 50: spaced

The realme 8 is a series of mid-range LTE smartphones developed and manufactured by Realme. The realme 8 and realme 8 Pro were unveiled on March 24, 2021, followed by the realme 8i on September 9 of the same year.

On February 24, 2022, the realme narzo 50 was introduced, which differs from the realme 8i only in color options and the absence of NFC.

== Specifications ==
=== Design and appearance ===
The front panel is made of glass, while the back panel and frame are made of plastic. All models feature a USB-C port, 3.5 mm audio jack, speaker, and microphone at the bottom.

The design and build appearances differ from the following models:

- On the realme 8 and realme 8 Pro, there is a second microphone at the top; the left side houses the tray for 2 SIM cards and a memory card, while the right side contains the volume rocker and power button.
- On the realme 8i/narzo 50, the volume buttons and SIM tray are on the left, while the power button (which includes an integrated fingerprint scanner) is on the right.

The color options differ from the following models:

- The realme 8 is available in Cyber Silver and Cyber Black.
- The realme 8 Pro is sold in four colors: Infinite Blue (matte), Infinite Black (matte), Punk Black (glossy), and Illuminating Yellow (matte).
- The realme 8i was sold in Space Black and Space Purple, while the realme narzo 50 is available in Speed Black and Speed Blue.

=== Hardware ===
==== Chipset ====
The realme 8 is powered by the mid-range MediaTek Helio G95 system on a chip, the realme 8 Pro utilizes the Qualcomm Snapdragon 720G, and the realme 8i/narzo 50 utilizes the MediaTek Helio G96.

==== Processor and GPU ====
All models were powered by octa-core, but has different composition form the models:

- The realme 8, 8i, and narzo 50 models were powered by 2× Cortex-A76 processors clocking at 2.05 GHz & 6× Cortex-A55 processors clocking at 2.0 GHz.
- The realme 8 Pro was powered by 2× Kryo 465 Gold processors clocking at 2.3 GHz & 6× Kryo 465 Silver processors clocking at 1.8 GHz.

The realme 8 was powered by the Mali-G76 MC4 GPU, Adreno 618 for the 8 Pro, and the Mali-G57 MC2 for the 8i/narzo 50 models.

==== Internal storage configurations ====
The realme 8 was available in 4/64, 4/128, 6/128, and 8/128 GB configurations; the realme 8 Pro in 6/128 and 8/128 GB; and the realme 8i/narzo 50 in 4/64, 4/128, and 6/128 GB. All models support storage expansion via microSD up to 256 GB.

=== Battery and Charging ===
The realme 8 and realme 8i/narzo 50 are equipped with a 5000 mAh battery, while the realme 8 Pro has a 4500 mAh battery. The realme 8 supports 30W Dart Charge, which Realme claims charges the device to 50% in 26 minutes and 100% in 65 minutes. The realme 8 Pro supports 50W SuperDart Charge, claiming 50% in 17 minutes and 100% in 47 minutes. The realme 8i/narzo 50 supports up to 18W fast charging.

=== Display ===
The realme 8 and realme 8 Pro feature a 6.4-inch Super AMOLED display with Full HD+ resolution (2400 × 1080), a 20:9 aspect ratio, 409 ppi pixel density, and a hole-punch cutout for the front camera in the upper left corner. Both models include an optical under-display fingerprint scanner.

The realme 8i/narzo 50 features a 6.6-inch IPS LCD display with Full HD+ resolution (2412 × 1080), a 20:9 aspect ratio, 400 ppi, a 120 Hz refresh rate, and a hole-punch cutout in the upper left.

=== Camera ===
The realme 8 and realme 8 Pro feature a quad-camera setup. The base model uses a 64 MP wide-angle lens with an f/1.8 aperture and PDAF, while the Pro model uses a 108 MP wide-angle lens with an f/1.9 aperture and PDAF. Both include an 8 MP ultrawide lens (f/2.3, 119˚) and 2 MP macro and depth sensors (f/2.4). The main camera can record video at 4K@30fps.

The realme 8i/narzo 50 features a triple camera setup with a 50 MP wide lens (f/1.8, PDAF) and 2 MP macro and depth sensors. It supports video recording up to 1080p@30fps.

All models feature a 16 MP wide-angle front camera with an f/2.5 aperture (8/Pro) or f/2.1 (8i/narzo 50), supporting 1080p@30fps video.

== Software ==
The smartphones were launched with realme UI 2.0 based on Android 11 and have been updated to realme UI 4.0 based on Android 13. The realme 8 Pro will receive the latest update in Q1 2023, followed by realme 8i in Q2 2023.

== Availability ==
Sales in India begin on March 24, 2021, followed by the Philippines on May 12, 2021 along with the realme 8 Pro. In the Philippines, pre-orders start from May 11 to 22 with free realme Buds Air Pro after purchase.

The start of sales for the realme 8 and realme 8 Pro in Ukraine was announced on August 2, 2021. In Ukraine, the realme 8 was only available in the 6/128 GB variant, and the realme 8 Pro in the 8/128 GB variant.

The narzo 50 went available in the Philippines in mid-May 2022 along with the realme Narzo 50A.
