= Realme narzo 20A =

2020 4G budget smartphone

realme narzo 20A
- Brand: realme
- Manufacturer: realme
- Type: Smartphone
- Series: realme narzo
- First released: September 30, 2020; 5 years ago
- Successor: realme C25
- Related: realme narzo 20 realme narzo 20 Pro realme C15
- Form factor: Slate
- Colors: Glory Silver, Victory Blue
- Dimensions: 164.4 × 75.4 × 8.9 mm (6.47 × 2.97 × 0.35 in)
- Weight: 6.88 oz (195 g)
- Operating system: Android 10 with Realme UI
- System-on-chip: Qualcomm SDM665 Snapdragon 665 (11 nm)
- CPU: Octa-core (4x 2.0 GHz Kryo 260 Gold & 4x 1.8 GHz Kryo 260 Silver)
- GPU: Adreno 610
- Memory: 3/4GB RAM
- Storage: 32/64GB eMMC 5.1
- Removable storage: microSDXC
- SIM: 2× NanoSIM
- Battery: 5,000 mAh
- Charging: 10W wired (microUSB 2.0)
- Rear camera: "AI" Triple camera: 12MP (28mm, wide, with PDAF & auxiliary lens f/1.8); 2MP B&W (22mm, f/2.4); 2MP Retro (22mm, f/2.4); Features LED flash, HDR and panorama Video recording up to 720p / 1080p / 4K @ 30fps
- Front camera: 8MP "AI Selfie" (26mm, wide, f/2.0); Features HDR and panorama Video recording up to 720p / 1080p @ 30fps
- Display: 6.5" IPS LCD; 720 × 1600 pixels, 20:9 ratio with Corning Gorilla Glass 3 protector
- Data inputs: Fingerprint (rear-mounted); Accelerometer; Proximity sensor; Compass

The realme narzo 20A is a budget 4G smartphone branded and manufactured by realme as part of the narzo series announced on September 21, 2020, along with the narzo 20 and narzo 20 Pro.

== Specifications ==
=== Hardware ===
The narzo 20A is equipped with a Qualcomm Snapdragon 665 chipset (with 4x 2.0 GHz Kryo 260 Gold & 4x 1.8 GHz Kryo 260 Silver central processors) and an Adreno 610 GPU. Its battery capacity is 5000 mAh and supports reverse charging.

With dimensions at 164.4 × 75.4 × 8.9 mm (6.47 × 2.97 × 0.35 in), it has an IPS LCD display sizing at 6.5 inches with a resolution of 720 × 1600 pixels (20:9 ratio) and a Corning Gorilla Glass 3 screen protector. It also supports 32GB + 3GB RAM and 64GB + 4GB RAM memory configurations.

The narzo 20A is equipped with an AI triple camera setup:

- 12MP (28mm, wide, with PDAF & auxiliary lens f/1.8), with video recording up to 720p / 1080p / 4K at 30fps
- 2MP B&W (22mm, f/2.4)
- 2MP Retro (22mm, f/2.4)

It also received an 8MP front camera with an aperture of f/2.0 and support 1080p @ 30fps video recording.

=== Software ===
The narzo 20A initially runs on Android 10 with Realme UI interface. It also received access and was updated to Android 11 with Realme 2.0 UI.
