= Realme 3 Pro =

2019 budget LTE smartphone

realme 3 Pro (realme X Lite in China)
- Developer: Realme
- Manufacturer: Oppo
- Type: Smartphone
- Series: Number series / X series
- First released: 3 Pro: April 22, 2019; 7 years ago X Lite: May 15, 2019; 7 years ago
- Predecessor: Realme 2 Pro
- Successor: Realme 5 Pro
- Related: Realme 3 Realme X
- Compatible networks: GSM, 3G, 4G (LTE)
- Form factor: Slate
- Colors: Carbon Gray, Lightning Purple, Nitro Blue
- Dimensions: 156.8×74.2×8.3 mm (6.17×2.92×0.33 in)
- Weight: 172 g (6 oz)
- Operating system: Original: Android 9 Pie with ColorOS 6 Current: Android 11 with Realme UI 2.0
- System-on-chip: Qualcomm Snapdragon 710 (10 nm)
- CPU: Octa-core (2×2.2 GHz Kryo 360 Gold & 6×1.7 GHz Kryo 360 Silver)
- GPU: Adreno 616
- Memory: 4/6 GB LPDDR4X
- Storage: 64/128 GB eMMC 5.1
- Removable storage: microSDXC up to 256 GB
- SIM: Dual SIM (Nano-SIM)
- Battery: Non-removable Li-Po 4045 mAh; Stand-by: 383 hours
- Charging: 20W Fast Charging; VOOC 3.0
- Rear camera: 16 MP Sony IMX519, f/1.7, 1/2.6", 1.22 µm, Dual Pixel PDAF + 5 MP, f/2.4 (depth sensor); LED flash, HDR; Video: 4K@30fps, 1080p@30/120fps, 720p@960fps
- Front camera: 25 MP, f/2.0, 1/2.8", 1.22 µm HDR; Video: 1080p@30fps
- Display: IPS LCD, 6.3", 2340 × 1080 (FullHD+), 19.5:9, 409 ppi
- Sound: Mono
- Connectivity: Micro-USB 2.0, 3.5 mm jack, Bluetooth 5.0 (A2DP, LE), FM radio, Wi-Fi 802.11 a/b/g/n/ac (dual-band, Wi-Fi Direct, hotspot), GPS, A-GPS, GLONASS
- Data inputs: Fingerprint sensor (rear-mounted), accelerometer, gyroscope, proximity sensor, compass

The Realme 3 Pro is a budget Android smartphone developed by Realme, which is an improved version of the Realme 3. It was introduced on April 22, 2019. Also, on May 15 of the same year, the Realme X Lite was introduced in China alongside the Realme X, which is a rebranded Realme 3 Pro.

The device was also pre-installed with the HyperBoost 2.0 gaming enhancement.

== Design ==
The screen is made of Corning Gorilla Glass 5. The body is made of glossy plastic with a striped gradient finish.

On the bottom, there is a Micro-USB port, speaker, microphones, and a 3.5 mm audio jack. The second microphone is located at the top. On the left side of the smartphone, there are volume control buttons and a slot for 2 SIM cards and a microSD memory card up to 256 GB. The lock button is located on the right side. The fingerprint scanner is located on the back panel.

The Realme 3 Pro was sold in 3 colors: Carbon Gray, Lightning Purple (black-purple), and Nitro Blue (blue-purple).

== Specifications ==
=== Platform ===
The smartphone is equipped with a Qualcomm Snapdragon 710 processor and an Adreno 616 GPU. It also has a central processor composed of 2x Kryo 360 Gold cores @ 2.2 GHz & 6x Kryo 360 Silver cores @ 1.7 GHz

=== Battery & Charging ===
The battery has a capacity of 4045 mAh and supports 20W VOOC 3.0 fast charging, which can take about half an hour from 0-50% and a full charge of 1 hour and 15 minutes.

=== Camera ===
The smartphone features a dual main camera setup. It has a 16 MP, f/1.7 and a 5 MP, f/2.4 (depth sensor) with Dual Pixel phase-detection autofocus and 4K@30fps video recording capability. The front camera has a resolution of 25 MP, an aperture of f/2.0, and supports 1080p@30fps video recording.

=== Display ===
The display is a 6.3" IPS LCD, FullHD+ (2340 × 1080) with a 19.5:9 aspect ratio, a pixel density of 409 ppi, and a waterdrop notch for the front camera.

=== Storage ===
The smartphone was sold in 4/64, 6/64, and 6/128 GB configurations.

=== Software ===
The smartphone was released running ColorOS 6 based on Android 9 Pie. It was updated to Realme UI 2.0 based on Android 11.
