= Realme Narzo 20 Pro =

Android smartphone

realme narzo 20 Pro
- Brand: realme
- Manufacturer: realme
- Type: Phablet
- Series: realme narzo Series
- Predecessor: realme Narzo
- Successor: realme narzo 30 Pro
- Related: realme 7 realme narzo 20 realme narzo 20A
- Form factor: Slate
- Dimensions: 162.30 mm × 75.40 mm × 9.40 mm (6.39 in × 2.97 in × 0.37 in)
- Weight: 191 g (6.74 oz)
- Operating system: Android 10 (Skinned with realme UI)
- System-on-chip: MediaTek Helio G95
- CPU: Octa core (2.05 GHz, Dual core, Cortex-A76 + 2 GHz, Hexa core, Cortex-A55)
- GPU: Mali-G76 MC4
- Memory: 6 GB, 8 GB LPDDR4X RAM
- Storage: 64 GB UFS 2.1, 128 GB UFS 2.1
- Removable storage: non-expandable
- Battery: Li-Po 4500 mAh battery
- Rear camera: 48 MP + 8 MP + 2 MP + 2 MP
- Front camera: 16 MP
- Display: 6.5 in IPS LCD; 102.0 cm^{2} (83.4% screen:body); 1080 px × 2400 px, 20:9 ratio (405 ppi density); Gorilla Glass 3; 480 nits max. brightness; 90 Hz refresh rate
- Connectivity: 4G, 3G, GSM
- Codename: narzo series
- Website: www.realme.com/in/realme-narzo-20-pro

realme narzo 20 Pro is an Android smartphone developed by the Chinese manufacturer Realme and was launched on 21 September 2020. It is third among the Narzo 20 series unveiled by the company. Narzo 20 Pro is available in two colours: White Knight and Black Ninja.

== Specifications ==
=== Hardware ===
The realme narzo 20 Pro uses the MediaTek Helio G95 gaming processor. It supports 65W Super Dart charging technology and offers a 4,500mAh battery. The phone measures 162.3x75.4x9.4mm and weighs 191g. It comes with dual SIM slots and up to 128GB storage facility that is expandable via microSD card through a dedicated slot.

The realme narzo 20 Pro features a 6.5-inch full-HD+ ultra smooth display with a 120 Hz touch sampling rate and a 90 Hz refresh rate. The display is also protected by a Corning Gorilla Glass.

=== Software ===
realme narzo 20 Pro runs on Realme UI based on Android 10.

=== Camera ===
The phone has a 48 megapixel AI quad rear camera setup with an f/1.8 lens. In the front it has a 16 megapixel Sony wide-angle selfie camera with an f/2.1 lens.

== Reception ==
The phone received mixed reviews from critics. Times Now praised the phone for its battery life, overall smooth performance but criticized its camera performance. The Indian Express described it as a gaming phone praising its smooth display and quick charging.
