= Realme Narzo 30 Pro =

Android-based smartphone manufactured by Realme

- Brand: Realme
- Manufacturer: Realme
- Type: Phablet
- Series: Realme Narzo Series
- First released: 2021, February 24
- Availability by region: Available. Released 2021, March 04
- Units sold: About 200 EUR
- Units shipped: About 200 EUR
- Predecessor: Realme Narzo 20 Pro
- Successor: Realme Narzo 50 Pro
- Related: Realme 7 5G; Realme Narzo 30; Realme Narzo 30 5G; Realme Narzo 30A; Realme Narzo 50A
- Form factor: Slate
- Dimensions: 162.2 x 75.1 x 9.1 mm (6.39 x 2.96 x 0.36 in)
- Weight: 196 g (6.91 oz)
- Operating system: Android 10, Realme UI
- System-on-chip: Mediatek Dimensity 800U (7 nm)
- CPU: Octa-core (2x2.4 GHz Cortex-A76 & 6x2.0 GHz Cortex-A55)
- GPU: Mali-G57 MC3
- Memory: 64GB 6GB RAM, 128GB 8GB RAM
- Storage: 64GB 6GB RAM, 128GB 8GB RAM
- Removable storage: microSDXC (uses shared SIM slot)
- SIM: Nano-SIM + Nano-SIM
- Battery: 5000 mAh
- Charging: 30W wired, PD, 50% in 25 min, 100% in 65 min
- Rear camera: 48 MP, f/1.8, 26mm (wide), 1/2.0", 0.8µm, PDAF, 8 MP, f/2.3, 119˚ (ultrawide), 1/4.0", 1.12µm, 2 MP (macro)
- Front camera: 16 MP, f/2.1, 26mm (wide), 1/3.09", 1.0µm
- Display: IPS LCD, 120Hz , 480 nits (typical), 600 nits (peak)
- Connectivity: GSM / HSPA / LTE / 5G
- Website: www.realme.com/in/realme-narzo-30-pro

The Realme Narzo 30 Pro 5G is an Android smartphone developed by the Chinese manufacturer Realme and was launched on 24 February 2021. It is the second smartphone among the Narzo 30 series unveiled by the company. Narzo 30 Pro is available in two colours: Blade Silver and Sword Black.

== Specifications ==
=== Hardware ===
The Realme Narzo 30 Pro uses the 5G-enabled MediaTek Dimensity 800U SoC. It has a 5000 mAh battery charging through the USB-C port and supports 30W Dart charging technology. The phone measures 162.2 × 75.1 × 9.1 mm and weighs 194 grams. The device features a 6.5 inch IPS LCD with 120 Hz refresh rate and 180 Hz touch sampling. The display is protected by Corning Gorilla Glass 3.

==== Camera ====
The Narzo 30 Pro 5G has a triple-camera setup on the rear consisting of a 48 MP wide angle primary camera with ISOCELL Plus sensor, f/1.8 aperture, 79° field-of-view and up to 10x digital zoom; an 8 MP ultrawide camera with f/2.3 aperture and a 2 MP macro camera with f/2.4 aperture for close-up shots. The front-facing camera is a 16 MP unit with f/2.05 aperture and it is located in a cutout in the top left corner of the display.

=== Software ===
Realme Narzo 30 Pro runs on Realme UI based on Android 11. Now it's been upgraded to Android 12.

== See also ==
- Realme
- Realme Narzo 20 Pro
- Realme 7
