= Realme C21 =

realme C21 realme C21Y
- Brand: realme
- Type: Phablet
- Series: C
- First released: C21: March 5, 2021; 5 years ago C21Y: June 21, 2021; 5 years ago
- Predecessor: Realme C11
- Successor: Realme C31
- Related: Realme C20; Realme C25
- Compatible networks: GSM, 3G, 4G (LTE)
- Form factor: Slate
- Colors: Cross Black & Cross Blue
- Dimensions: C21: 165.2 × 76.4 × 8.9 mm C21Y: 164.5 × 76 × 9.1 mm
- Weight: C21: 190 g C21Y: 200 g
- Operating system: C21: Original: Android 10 + realme UI 1 Current: Android 11 + realme UI 2 C21Y: Original: Android 11 + realme R Edition
- CPU: C21: MediaTek MT6762 Helio G35 (12 nm), 8 cores (4×2.3 GHz Cortex-A53 & 4×1.8 GHz Cortex-A53); C21Y: Unisoc T610 (12 nm), 8 cores (2×1.8 GHz Cortex-A75 & 6×1.8 GHz Cortex-A53)
- GPU: C21: PowerVR GE8320; C21Y: Mali-G52
- Memory: 3/4 GB LPDDR4X
- Storage: 32/64 GB eMMC 5.1
- Removable storage: MicroSDXC up to 256 GB
- Battery: Non-removable, Li-Po 5000 mAh
- Charging: 10 W, reverse charging
- Rear camera: 13 MP, f/2.2 (wide-angle), 1/3.06", 1.12 μm, PDAF + 2 MP, f/2.4, (macro) + 2 MP, f/2.4, (depth sensor); LED flash, HDR, panorama Video: 1080p@30fps
- Front camera: 5 MP, f/2.2 (wide-angle), 1/5.0", 1.12 μm HDR, panorama Video: 1080p@30fps
- Display: IPS LCD, 6.5", 1600 × 720 (HD+), 20:9, 270 ppi
- Connectivity: microUSB 2.0, 3.5 mm Audio, Bluetooth 5.0 (A2DP, LE), FM radio, Wi-Fi 802.11 b/g/n (hotspot), GPS, A-GPS, GLONASS, BDS
- Data inputs: Rear-mounted fingerprint scanner, accelerometer, proximity sensor, compass

The realme C21 is an entry-level smartphone developed and manufactured by realme. It was introduced on March 5, 2021. Also on June 21 of the same year, the realme C21Y was introduced, featuring a more powerful processor and a design similar to the realme C11.

== Design ==
The screen is made of glass. The body is made of plastic and has a special texture.

On the bottom, there is a microUSB port, a microphone, and a 3.5 mm audio jack. On the left side of the smartphone, there is a slot for 2 SIM cards and a microSD card up to 256 GB. On the right side are the volume buttons and the power button. On the back, there is the main camera module with an LED flash, a fingerprint scanner, and the main speaker.

The smartphones were sold in Cross Black (Black) and Cross Blue (Blue) colors.

== Technical specifications ==
=== Platform ===
The realme C21 utilises the MediaTek Helio G35 processor and the PowerVR GE8320 GPU.

The realme C21Y utilises the Unisoc T610 processor and the Mali-G52 GPU.

=== Battery ===
Both smartphones utilise the battery capacity of 5000 mAh. The smartphones also have support for reverse wired charging.

=== Camera ===
The smartphones feature a triple rear camera setup: 13 MP, f/2.2 (wide-angle) + 2 MP, f/2.4 (macro) + 2 MP, f/2.4 (depth sensor) with phase-detection autofocus and the ability to record video at 1080p@30fps. The front camera has a 5 MP resolution, an f/2.2 aperture (wide-angle), and is capable of recording video at 1080p@30fps.

=== Display ===
Both smartphone have a 6.5-inch IPS LCD with 720 x 1600 HD+ resolution and an aspect ratio of 20:9, a pixel density of 270 ppi, and a waterdrop notch for the front camera. However, in outdoor conditions, the brightness is too low.

=== Memory ===
The smartphones were available in 3/32 GB and 4/64 GB configurations.

=== Software ===
The realme C21 was released with realme UI 1 based on Android 10 and was later updated to realme UI 2 based on Android 11.

The realme C21Y was released with realme UI R Edition (a simplified version of realme UI) based on Android 11.
