= Realme 6 Pro =

Mid-range Android smartphone by Realme

realme 6 Pro
- Brand: realme
- Type: Phablet
- Series: realme
- First released: March 5, 2020; 6 years ago
- Availability by region: March 5, 2020; India & Europe; March 13, 2020; Worldwide; May 27, 2020; Philippines
- Predecessor: Realme 5 Pro
- Successor: Realme 7 Pro
- Related: Realme 6 Realme 6i
- Compatible networks: GSM, 3G, 4G (LTE)
- Form factor: Slate
- Colors: Lightning Blue, Lightning Orange, Lightning Red
- Dimensions: 163.8×75.8×8.9 mm (6.45×2.98×0.35 in)
- Weight: 202 g (7 oz)
- Operating system: Original: Android 10 with realme UI 1 Current: Android 11 with realme UI 2
- CPU: Qualcomm Snapdragon 720G (8 nm), octa-core (2×2.3 GHz Kryo 465 Gold & 6×1.8 GHz Kryo 465 Silver)
- GPU: Adreno 618
- Memory: 6/8 GB, LPDDR4X
- Storage: 64/128 GB, UFS 2.1
- Removable storage: microSDXC up to 512 GB
- Battery: Non-removable, Li-Po 4300 mAh
- Charging: 30W fast charging, 100% in 57 min (manufacture claimed); VOOC 4.0
- Rear camera: 64 MP, f/1.8, 26 mm (wide), 1/1.72", 0.8 µm, PDAF + 12 MP, f/2.5, 54 mm (telephoto), 1/3.4", 1.0 µm, PDAF, 2x optical zoom + 8 MP, f/2.3, 13 mm (ultrawide), 1/4.0", 1.12 µm + 2 MP, f/2.4 (macro); LED flash, HDR, panorama Video: 4K@30fps, 1080p@30/60/120fps, gyro-EIS
- Front camera: 16 MP, f/2.1, 26 mm (wide), 1/3.06", 1.0 µm + 8 MP, f/2.2, 105˚ (ultrawide), 1/4.0", 1.12 µm HDR, panorama 1080p@30fps
- Display: IPS LCD, 6.6", 2400 × 1080 (Full HD+), 20:9, 399 ppi, 90 Hz
- Connectivity: USB-C 2.0, 3.5 mm audio jack, Bluetooth 5.1 (A2DP, LE), NFC (region dependent), FM radio, Wi-Fi 802.11 a/b/g/n/ac (dual-band, Wi-Fi Direct, hotspot), GPS, A-GPS, GLONASS, BeiDou
- Other: Fingerprint scanner (side-mounted), accelerometer, gyroscope, proximity, compass
- Website: Official website

The realme 6 Pro is a mid-range smartphone developed & manufactured by realme as an high-end version of the realme 6. It was announced on March 5, 2020 (also launched in India and Europe with the same day) and officially launched on March 13, 2020. It also released on May 27, 2020 in the Philippines along with the Realme 6.

== Specifications ==
=== Design ===
The screen is made of Corning Gorilla Glass 5. The body is made of plastic and features a "lightning" gradient finish.

On the bottom, there is a USB-C port, a speaker, a microphone, and a 3.5 mm audio jack. A second microphone is located at the top. The left side of the smartphone contains the volume buttons and a slot for two SIM cards and a microSD memory card up to 512 GB. The right side features the power button, which includes an integrated fingerprint scanner.

The realme 6 Pro was sold in three colors: Lightning Blue, Lightning Red and Lightning Orange.

=== Hardware ===
The smartphone is powered by a Qualcomm Snapdragon 720G processor and an Adreno 618 GPU. The device features a 4300 mAh battery with support for 30W VOOC 4.0 fast charging. The display is an IPS LCD, 6.6", Full HD+ (2400 × 1080) with a 20:9 aspect ratio, a pixel density of 399 ppi, a 90 Hz refresh rate, and an oval-shaped cutout for the dual front cameras.

The realme 6 Pro was available in 6/64 GB, 6/128 GB, and 8/128 GB configurations.

=== Camera ===
The smartphone features a quad main camera setup: a 64 MP f/1.8 (wide) sensor, a 12 MP f/2.5 (telephoto) sensor with 2x optical zoom, an 8 MP f/2.3 (ultrawide) sensor, and a 2 MP f/2.4 (macro) sensor. It includes phase-detection autofocus (PDAF) and supports 4K video recording at 30fps. The device also has a dual front-facing camera system with a 16 MP f/2.1 (wide) sensor and an 8 MP f/2.2 (ultrawide) sensor with a 105° field of view. The front cameras can record video in 1080p at 30fps.

=== Software ===
The smartphone was released with realme UI 1 based on Android 10. It was later updated to realme UI 2 based on Android 11 in late April 2021 along with the realme 7 Pro.
