= Realme C30 =

Budget Android smartphones by Realme

realme C30 realme C30s realme narzo 50i Prime
- Brand: realme
- Manufacturer: realme
- Type: Phablet
- Series: C series / narzo series
- First released: C30: June 20, 2022; 4 years ago narzo 50i Prime: June 22, 2022; 4 years ago C30s: September 14, 2022; 3 years ago
- Predecessor: Realme C20
- Related: Realme C31; Realme C33; Realme C35 realme narzo 50; Realme Narzo 50 5G realme narzo 50 Pro realme narzo 50A
- Compatible networks: GSM, 3G, 4G (LTE)
- Form factor: Slate
- Dimensions: C30/narzo 50i Prime: 164.1 × 75.6 × 8.5 mm C30s: 164.2 × 75.7 × 8.5 mm
- Weight: C30/narzo 50i Prime: 182 g C30s: 186 g
- Operating system: C30/narzo 50i Prime: Android 11 with realme UI Go Edition; C30s: Android 12 with realme UI Go Edition
- CPU: C30/narzo 50i Prime: Unisoc T612 (12 nm), Octa-core (2×1.8 GHz Cortex-A75 & 6×1.8 GHz Cortex-A53); C30s: Unisoc SC9863A (28 nm), 8×1.6 GHz Cortex-A55
- GPU: C30/narzo 50i Prime: Mali-G57; C30s: PowerVR IMG8322
- Memory: C30/C30s: 2/3/4 GB narzo 50i Prime: 3/4 GB; LPDDR4X
- Storage: 32/64 GB; C30/narzo 50i Prime: UFS 2.2; C30s: eMMC 5.1
- Removable storage: microSDXC up to 1 TB
- Battery: Non-removable Li-Po 5000 mAh
- Charging: 10 W narzo 50i Prime: Reverse charging
- Rear camera: 8 MP, f/2.0, 27 mm (wide), 1/4", 1.12 µm, AF; LED flash, HDR, panorama Video: 1080p@30fps
- Front camera: 5 MP, f/2.2, 27 mm (wide), 1/5.0", 1.12 µm HDR; Video: 720p@30fps
- Display: IPS LCD, 6.5", 1600 × 720 (HD+), 20:9, 270 ppi
- Connectivity: microUSB 2.0, 3.5 mm audio jack, Bluetooth 5.0 (A2DP, LE), FM radio, Wi-Fi 802.11 b/g/n, GPS, GLONASS, Galileo, BeiDou
- SAR: C30: Head 1.02 W/kg; Body 0.68 W/kg
- Other: Fingerprint scanner (side-mounted; C30s), accelerometer, proximity sensor, compass
- Website: www.realme.com/eu/realme-c30 www.realme.com/in/realme-c30-s www.realme.com/eu/realme-narzo-50i-prime

realme C30 and realme C30s are entry-level smartphones developed by realme. The main differences between the models are a less powerful processor and the presence of a fingerprint scanner on the C30s. The realme C30 was introduced on June 20, 2022, and the C30s was introduced on September 14. Additionally, two days after the realme C30 announcement, a similar model called the realme narzo 50i Prime was presented with a different back panel design.

== Specifications ==
=== Design & Build ===
The screen is protected by glass. The back panel and side edges are made of plastic. On the other hand, the realme narzo 50i Prime has vertical stripes on the back panel are narrower than on the C30, and the camera island spans the entire width of the body. With dimensions of 164.1 × 75.6 × 8.5 mm (C30/narzo 50i Prime) to 164.2 × 75.7 × 8.5 mm (C30s) respectively, the display is an IPS LCD, 6.5", HD+ (1600 × 720) with a 20:9 aspect ratio, 270 ppi pixel density, and a waterdrop notch for the front camera.

Color options may differ from the varying models:

- The realme C30 is sold in three colors: Lake Blue, Bamboo Green, and Denim Black.
- The realme narzo 50i Prime is available in Dark Blue and Mint Green.
- The realme C30s is available in Stripe Black and Stripe Blue.

=== Hardware ===
The realme C30 and narzo 50i Prime, like the Realme C31, utilize the Unisoc T612 processor with a Mali-G57 GPU, while the realme C30s features the Unisoc SC9863A processor and a PowerVR IMG8322 GPU. The battery has a capacity of 5000 mAh. Additionally, the realme narzo 50i Prime supports reverse wired charging.

=== Camera ===
The smartphones are equipped with an 8 MP main camera, f/2.0 (wide-angle; with "SmartSens" sensor) with autofocus and 1080p@30fps video recording capability. The front camera has a resolution of 5 MP, f/2.2 aperture (wide-angle), and 720p@30fps video recording capability.

=== Memory/Storage Configurations ===
Internal storage options may differ from the varying models:

- The realme C30 and C30s are sold in 2/32, 3/32, and 4/64 GB configurations.
- The realme narzo 50i Prime is available in 3/32 and 4/64 GB configurations.
- The realme C30 and narzo 50i Prime use UFS 2.2 storage, while the C30s uses eMMC 5.1.

=== Software ===
The smartphones were released with realme UI Go Edition based on Android 11 (C30 and narzo 50i Prime) or Android 12 (C30s).

== Availability and Pricing ==
The realme C30 was officially launched on June 20, 2022 in India at 7000 rupees. On July 20, 2022 the phone was released in the Philippines with a price of 5,499 pesos.

The narzo 50i Prime was released on June 22, 2022. Additionally, the C30s was initially launched on September 22, 2022 along with the narzo 50 Prime.
