= Realme 6 =

Android smartphone

realme 6 realme 6s (realme 6i in India; realme Narzo in Indonesia)
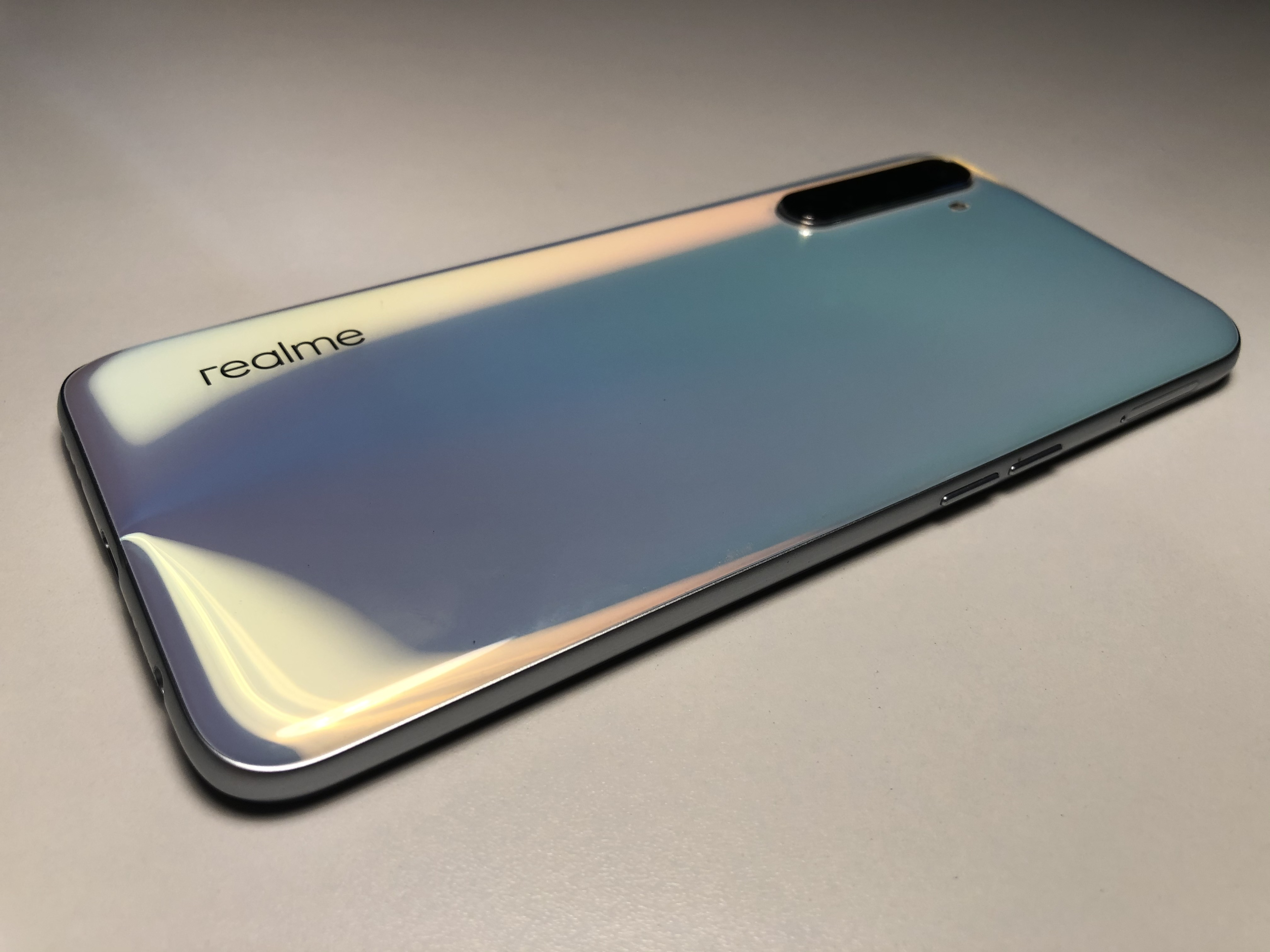
- realme 6
- Brand: realme
- Manufacturer: realme
- Type: Phablet
- Series: realme / Narzo
- First released: March 5, 2020; 6 years ago
- Availability by region: Realme 6: List: Europe: April 6, 2020; Philippines: May 27, 2020; Realme 6s: List: Europe: June 15, 2020
- Predecessor: realme 5
- Successor: realme 7 realme 8s 5G
- Related: realme 6 Pro realme 6i
- Compatible networks: GSM, 3G, 4G (LTE)
- Form factor: Slate
- Dimensions: 162.1×74.8×8.9 mm (6.38×2.94×0.35 in)
- Weight: 191 g (7 oz)
- Operating system: Initial: Android 10 + realme UI 1 Current: Android 11 + realme UI 2
- CPU: MediaTek MT6785 Helio G90T (12 nm), octa-core (2×2.05 GHz Cortex-A76 & 6×2.0 GHz Cortex-A55)
- GPU: Mali-G76 MC4
- Memory: RAM: 4 / 6 / 8 GB, LPDDR4X
- Storage: 6 & 6s: 64 / 128 GB; 6i (India): 64 / 128 GB; Narzo: 128 GB; UFS 2.1
- Removable storage: microSDXC up to 512 GB
- Battery: Non-removable, Li-Po 4300 mAh
- Charging: 30W fast charging, 100% in 55 min (advertised)
- Rear camera: 6: 64 MP, f/1.8, 26 mm (wide), 1/1.72", 0.8 µm, PDAF + 8 MP, f/2.3, 13 mm, 119˚ (ultrawide), 1/4.0", 1.12 µm + 2 MP, f/2.4 (macro) + 2 MP B/W, f/2.4 (depth sensor); 6s & 6i (India) & Narzo: 48 MP, f/1.8, 26 mm (wide), 1/2.0", 0.8 µm, PDAF + 8 MP, f/2.3, 13 mm, 119˚ (ultrawide), 1/4.0", 1.12 µm + 2 MP, f/2.4 (macro) + 2 MP B/W, f/2.4 (depth sensor); LED flash, HDR, panorama Video: 4K@30fps, 1080p@30/60/120fps, gyro-EIS
- Front camera: 16 MP, f/2.0, 26 mm (wide), 1/3.06", 1.0 µm HDR, panorama Video: 1080p@30fps
- Display: IPS LCD, 6.5", 2400 × 1080 (FullHD+), 20:9, 405 ppi, 90 Hz
- Connectivity: USB-C 2.0, 3.5 mm audio jack, Bluetooth 5.0 (A2DP, LE), NFC (6 & 6s, region dependent), FM radio, Wi-Fi 802.11 a/b/g/n/ac (dual-band, Wi-Fi Direct, hotspot), GPS, A-GPS, GLONASS, BeiDou
- Data inputs: Side-mounted fingerprint scanner, accelerometer, gyroscope, proximity sensor, compass
- Development status: Discontinued

The realme 6 is a mid-range Android smartphone developed and manufactured by realme. It was announced on March 5, 2020, alongside the realme 6 Pro.

The initial launch takes place in Europe on April 6, 2020, following its pre-order on March 31, 2020.

== Model variations ==
On May 26 of the same year, the realme 6s was unveiled. It is identical to the realme 6 except for its 48 MP main camera module, compared to the 64 MP module found on the realme 6. On June 23, the realme Narzo was announced as a rebranded realme 6s for the Indonesian market. On July 24, the realme 6i (not to be confused with the global realme 6i) was launched in India, which is also a rebranded version of the realme 6s.

== Technical specifications ==
=== Design ===
The front display is constructed from Corning Gorilla Glass 3. The rear body panel is made of glossy plastic.

The bottom edge houses the USB-C port, a loudspeaker, microphones, and a 3.5 mm audio jack. The left side features the volume rocker keys along with a triple-slot tray accommodating two SIM cards and a microSD expansion card up to 512 GB. The right side contains the power button, which integrates a side-mounted capacitive fingerprint sensor.

The realme 6 was made available in Comet Blue and Comet White color variants. The realme 6s and Indian realme 6i were available in Eclipse Black and Lunar White. The realme Narzo was released in Just Black and Just White.

=== Hardware ===
The smartphones are powered by the MediaTek Helio G90T system-on-chip paired with a Mali-G76 MC4 graphics processor.

=== Battery ===
The devices are equipped with a 4300 mAh non-removable battery that supports 30W fast charging.

=== Cameras ===
The realme 6 features a quad-camera setup on the back: a 64 MP main camera with a f/1.8 aperture (wide), phase-detection autofocus (PDAF), an 8 MP camera with an f/2.3 aperture (ultrawide), a 2 MP macro camera with an f/2.4 aperture, and a 2 MP monochrome depth sensor with an f/2.4 aperture.

The other models replace the primary sensor with a 48 MP main camera with an f/1.8 aperture, while keeping the rest of the layout identical (8 MP ultrawide with f/2.3 aperture, 2 MP macro with f/2.4 aperture, and 2 MP depth sensor with f/2.4 aperture).

The rear camera arrays across all variants are capable of recording video up to 4K at 30fps.

All variants feature a 16 MP front-facing camera with an f/2.0 aperture (wide), which is capable of capturing 1080p video at 30fps.

=== Display ===
The device uses a 6.5-inch IPS LCD panel with a FullHD+ resolution (2400 × 1080 pixels). It has a 20:9 aspect ratio, a pixel density of ~405 ppi, a 90 Hz refresh rate, and features a circular punch-hole cutout for the front camera located in the upper left corner.

=== Storage and Memory ===
The realme 6 was produced in memory configurations of 4/64 GB, 4/128 GB, 6/128 GB, and 8/128 GB using UFS 2.1 storage technology. The realme 6s was offered in 4/64 GB and 6/128 GB configurations. The Indian realme 6i was offered in 4/64 GB and 6/64 GB variants. The realme Narzo was sold exclusively in a 4/128 GB version.

=== Software ===
The series launched out of the box running realme UI 1 based on Android 10 and was subsequently updated to realme UI 2 based on Android 11.

OS / Software update history
OS / User interface version
Phone	Pre-release	1st	2nd	End of support
Realme 6	Android 10 Realme UI	Android 11 Realme UI 2.0 (open beta) July 2021	Android 11 Realme UI 2.0 (initial) September 2021	March 2024
Realme 6i	Android 10 Realme UI	Android 11 Realme UI 2.0 (open beta) July 2021	Android 11 Realme UI 2.0 (initial) September 2021	March 2024
