= Realme C33 =

Android smartphone announced in 2022

- Developer: Realme
- Series: Realme "C"
- First released: September 12, 2022; 4 years ago
- Successor: Realme C53
- Related: Realme C30; Realme C31; Realme C35
- Compatible networks: 2G GSM; 850, 900, 1800, 1900; 3G(HSDPA); 850, 900, 2100; 4G LTE; 1, 3, 5, 8, 38, 40, 41
- Colors: Sandy Gold, Aqua Blue, Night Sea
- Weight: 187 g (6.60 oz)
- Operating system: Android 12, Realme UI S
- System-on-chip: Unisoc Tiger T612 (12 nm)
- CPU: 2×1.8 GHz Cortex-A75 & 6×1.8 GHz Cortex-A55
- GPU: Mali-G57
- Memory: microSDXC, 3 GB or 4 GB
- Storage: 32 GB, 64 GB, or 128 GB
- Battery: 5000 mAh
- Charging: 10W
- Rear camera: 50 MP (wide), PDAF, auxiliary lens, LED flash, HDR, panorama Video: 1080p@30fps 0.3MP depth sensor
- Front camera: 5 MP, f/2.2, HDR; Video: 720p@30fps
- Display: IPS LCD, 6.5 inches, 720 × 1600 pixels, 20:9 ratio (~270 ppi density), 400 nits (typ)
- Connectivity: GPS, GLONASS, GALILEO, BDS

The Realme C33 is an entry-level Android smartphone developed by Realme. It was announced on September 6, 2022, and released on September 12, 2022. It was also released in the Philippines on October 14, 2022 .

The device features a polycarbonate back panel and was marketed with Realme's "Boundless Sea" design. It was available in three color options: Sandy Gold, Aqua Blue, and Night Sea.

== Technical specifications ==
=== Hardware ===
The Realme C33 is powered by a Unisoc Tiger T612 system-on-chip, featuring an octa-core CPU with two Cortex-A75 cores clocked at 1.8 GHz and six Cortex-A55 cores clocked at 1.8 GHz, along with a Mali-G57 GPU. It is equipped with a 5000 mAh battery and supports 10 W wired charging.

The device features a 6.5-inch IPS LCD display with a resolution of 720 × 1600 pixels, a 20:9 aspect ratio, and a typical brightness of 400 nits.

The rear camera system consists of a 50-megapixel wide sensor with an auxiliary lens and supports video recording at 1080p at 30 frames per second with 0.3-megapixel depth senor. The front camera uses a 5-megapixel sensor for selfies and video recording.

The Realme C33 was released in configurations of 3 GB or 4 GB of RAM, with storage options of 32 GB, 64 GB, or 128 GB, expandable via microSD card.

=== Software ===
The Realme C33 ships with Android 12 and Realme UI S.
