= Realme C15 =

2020 smartphone model

realme C15 realme C15 Qualcomm Edition
- Developer: realme
- Manufacturer: Oppo
- Type: Phablet
- Series: realme C
- First released: MediaTek: July 28, 2020; 5 years ago Qualcomm: October 28, 2020; 5 years ago
- Availability by region: Indonesia: July 28, 2020; Philippines: August 20, 2020
- Successor: Realme C25
- Related: Realme C11; Realme C12; Realme C17
- Compatible networks: GSM, 3G, 4G (LTE)
- Form factor: Slate
- Dimensions: 164.5×75.9×9.8 mm (6.48×2.99×0.39 in)
- Weight: 209 g (7 oz)
- Operating system: Initial: Android 10 with realme UI 1 Current: Android 11 with realme UI 2
- CPU: MediaTek: MediaTek MT6762 Helio G35 (12 nm), octa-core (4×2.3 GHz Cortex-A53 & 4×1.8 GHz Cortex-A53); Qualcomm: Qualcomm Snapdragon 460 (11 nm), octa-core (4×1.8 GHz Kryo 240 & 4×1.6 GHz Kryo 240)
- GPU: MediaTek: PowerVR GE8320; Qualcomm: Adreno 610
- Memory: 3/4 GB LPDDR4X
- Storage: 32/64/128 GB eMMC 5.1
- Removable storage: MicroSDXC up to 256 GB
- Battery: Non-removable, Li-Po 6000 mAh
- Charging: 18 W fast charging
- Rear camera: 13 MP, f/2.2 (wide), PDAF + 8 MP, f/2.25, 119˚ (ultrawide), AF + 2 MP, f/2.4 (B&W), 1/5.0", 1.75 µm + 2 MP, f/2.4 (macro), 1/5.0", 1.75 µmLED flash, HDR, panorama Video: 1080p@30fps
- Front camera: 8 MP, f/2.0 (wide)HDR, panorama Video: 1080p@30fps
- Display: IPS LCD, 6.5", 1600 × 720 (720p HD+), 20:9, 270 ppi
- Connectivity: USB microUSB 2.0, 3.5 mm jack, Bluetooth 5.0 (A2DP, LE, aptX (MediaTek) / aptX HD (Qualcomm)), FM radio, Wi-Fi 802.11 b/g/n (hotspot), GPS, A-GPS, GLONASS, BeiDou
- Other: Fingerprint scanner (rear-mounted), accelerometer, proximity sensor, compass

The realme C15 and realme C15 Qualcomm Edition are entry-level Android smartphones developed and manufactured by realme. The C15 was introduced on July 28, 2020 (August 20 for Philippine markets), and the C15 Qualcomm Edition was introduced on October 28, 2020.

== Design & build ==
The display is made of Corning Gorilla Glass. The body is constructed from matte plastic.

At the bottom, there is a USB microUSB 2.0 port, a speaker, a microphone, and a 3.5 mm audio jack. On the left side of the smartphone, there is a slot for 2 SIM cards and a MicroSD memory card up to 256 GB. The volume adjustment keys and the power button are placed on the right side. The fingerprint scanner is located on the rear panel.

The realme C15 is available in Marine Blue and Seagull Silver.

The realme C15 Qualcomm Edition is available in Power Blue and Power Silver.

== Technical specifications ==
=== Hardware ===
The C15 features a MediaTek Helio G35 processor and a PowerVR GE8320 GPU. On the other hand, the C15 Qualcomm Edition features a Qualcomm Snapdragon 460 processor and an Adreno 610 GPU.

The battery capacity is 6000 mAh and supports 18 W fast charging for both devices.

=== Cameras ===
The smartphones feature a quad rear camera configuration: 13 MP, f/2.2 (wide) + 8 MP, f/2.25 (ultrawide) + 2 MP, f/2.4 (black and white) + 2 MP, f/2.4 (macro) with phase-detection autofocus (PDAF) and the capability to record video at 1080p resolution at 30fps. The front camera has an 8 MP resolution, an aperture of f/2.0 (wide), and the capability to record video at 1080p resolution at 30fps.

=== Display ===
The display is a 6.5" IPS LCD with a 720p HD+ (1600 × 720) resolution, a 20:9 aspect ratio, a pixel density of 270 ppi, and a waterdrop notch for the front camera.

=== Memory ===
The configurations of the smartphone differ from the following models:

- The C15 is sold in configurations of 3/32, 3/64, 4/64, and 4/128 GB.
- The C15 Qualcomm Edition is sold in configurations of 3/32, 4/64, and 4/128 GB.

=== Software ===
The smartphones were released running realme UI 1 based on Android 10. They were subsequently updated to realme UI 2 based on Android 11.
