= Realme C35 =

Smartphone model

realme C35 realme narzo 50A Prime
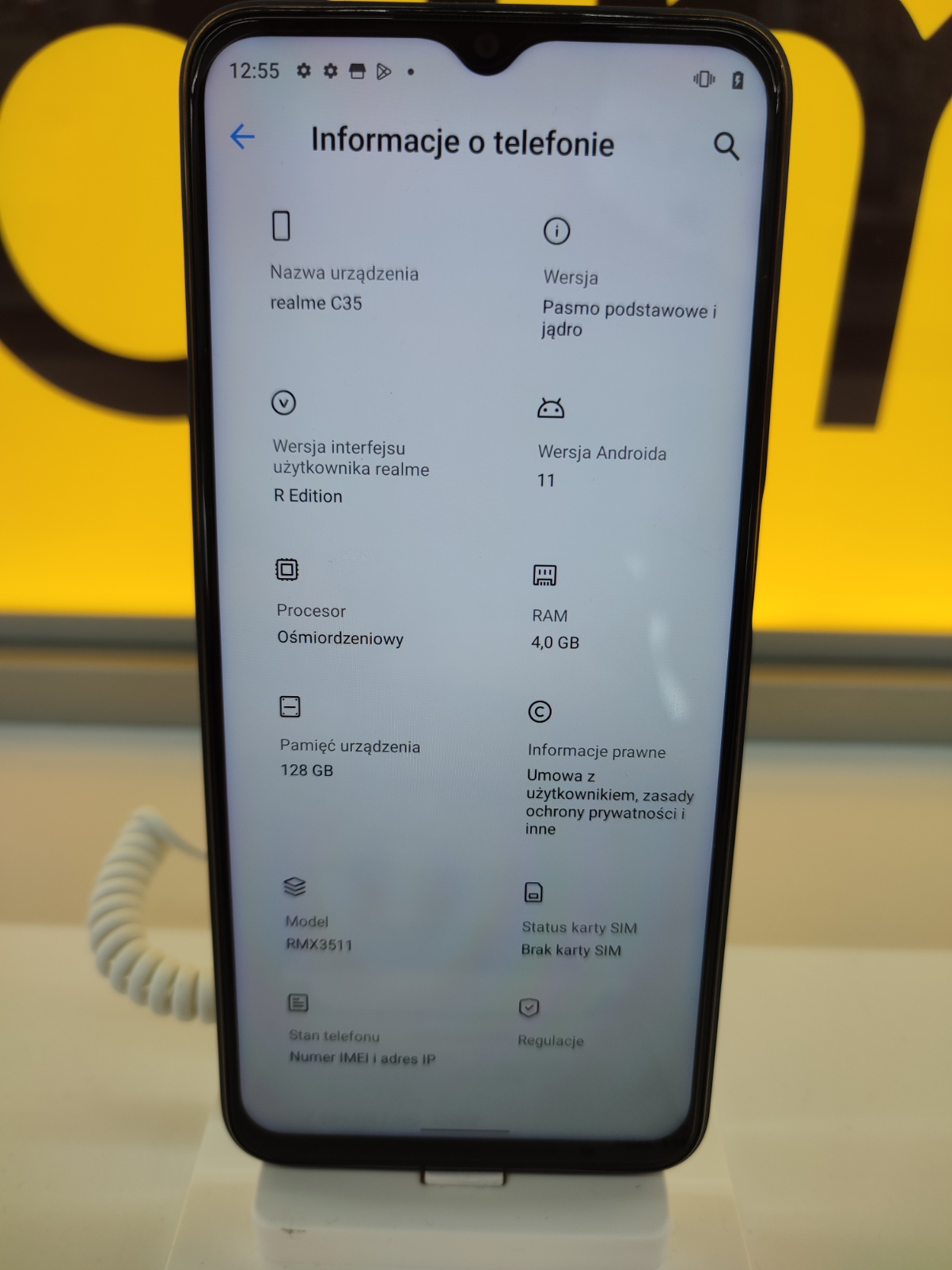
- Front of realme C35
- Brand: Realme
- Type: Phablet
- Series: C/narzo
- First released: C35: February 10, 2022; 4 years ago narzo 50A Prime: March 22, 2022; 4 years ago
- Predecessor: Realme C25
- Related: Realme C30; Realme C31; Realme C33; Realme Narzo 50; Realme Narzo 50 5G; Realme Narzo 50 Pro; Realme Narzo 50i
- Compatible networks: GSM, 3G, 4G (LTE)
- Form factor: Monoblock
- Dimensions: 164.4×75.6×8.1 mm (6.47×2.98×0.32 in)
- Weight: 189 g (7 oz)
- Operating system: Initial: Android 11 + realme UI R Edition; Current: Android 13 + realme UI T Edition
- System-on-chip: C35: Unisoc T616 (12 nm) narzo 50A Prime: Unisoc T612 (12 nm)
- CPU: C35: Octa-core (2×2.0 GHz Cortex-A75 & 6×1.8 GHz Cortex-A55) narzo 50A Prime: Octa-core (2×1.8 GHz Cortex-A75 & 6×1.8 GHz Cortex-A55)
- GPU: C35: Mali-G57 MP1 narzo 50A Prime: Mali-G57
- Memory: C35: 4/6 GB narzo 50A Prime: 4 GB; LPDDR4X
- Storage: 64/128 GB, UFS 2.2
- Removable storage: microSDXC up to 256 GB
- Battery: Non-removable, Li-Po 5000 mAh
- Charging: Fast charging 18 W
- Rear camera: 50 MP Samsung JN1, f/1.8, 26 mm (wide), 1/2.76", 0.64 μm, PDAF + 2 MP, f/2.4 (macro) + 0.3 MP, f/2.8 (depth sensor); LED flash, HDR, panorama Video: 1080p@30fps
- Front camera: 8 MP, f/2.0, 26 mm (wide), 1/4.0", 1.12 μm HDR, panorama Video: 720p@30fps
- Display: IPS LCD, 6.6", 2408 × 1080 (FullHD+), 20:9, 401 ppi
- Connectivity: USB-C 2.0, 3.5 mm Audio, Bluetooth 5.0 (A2DP, LE), FM radio, Wi-Fi 802.11 a/b/g/n/ac (dual-band, Wi-Fi Direct, hotspot), GPS, A-GPS, GLONASS, BDS
- Other: Fingerprint scanner (side-mounted), accelerometer, proximity sensor, compass

The Realme C35 (stylized as realme C35) is a entry-budget-level smartphone, developed by Realme. It was unveiled on February 10, 2022.

Additionally, under the Narzo series, the Realme Narzo 50A Prime (stylized as realme narzo 50A Prime) was introduced, which is positioned as an improved version of Realme Narzo 50A and differs from the realme C35 by a weaker processor and its back panel design.

== Design ==
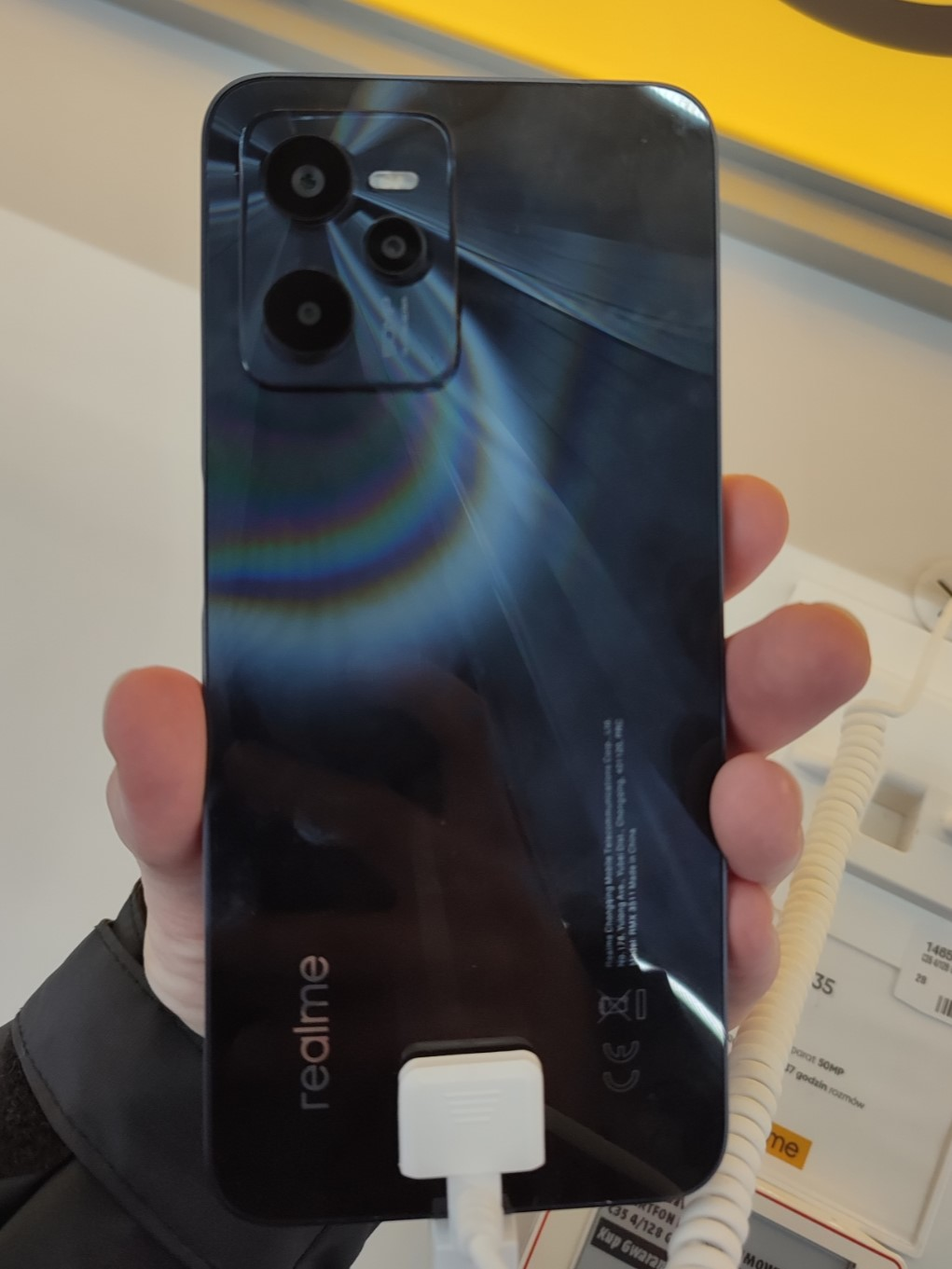
Back panel of realme C35 in Glowing Black

The screen is made of Panda Glass. The flat bezels are made of matte plastic. The back panel of the realme C35 is made of glossy plastic, while in the narzo 50A Prime, it's mostly matte plastic with a textured finish and a glossy area at the top. In the realme C35, the camera module is transparent, whereas in the narzo 50A Prime, it's black. Also, while the C35 has inscriptions on its camera module, similar inscriptions are present on the glossy area of the narzo 50A Prime.

The bottom is a USB-C connector, a speaker, a microphone, and a 3.5 mm audio jack. On the left side of the smartphone are the volume buttons and a slot for two SIM cards and a microSD memory card up to 256 GB. The power button, which also integrates a fingerprint scanner, is located on the right side.

The realme C35 is available in Glowing Green and Glowing Black.

The realme narzo 50A Prime is available in Flash Black and Flash Blue (Blue).

== Technical specifications ==
=== Processor ===
The C35 received a Unisoc T616 processor with a Mali-G57 MC1 GPU, and the narzo 50A Prime received a Unisoc T612 with Mali-G57.

=== Battery ===
The battery has a capacity of 5000 mAh and supports 18 W fast charging.

=== Camera ===
The smartphones feature a 50 MP triple main camera, f/1.8 (wide-angle) with phase autofocus + 2 MP, f/2.4 (macro) + 0.3 MP, f/2.8 (depth sensor) with 1080p@30fps video recording capability. The front camera has an 8 MP resolution, f/2.0 aperture (wide-angle), and 720p@30fps video recording capability.

=== Display ===
The display is an IPS LCD, 6.6", Full HD+ (2408 × 1080) with a 20:9 aspect ratio, 401 ppi pixel density, and a waterdrop notch for the front camera.

=== Storage ===
The realme C35 is sold in 4/64, 6/64, and 4/128 GB configurations, while the narzo 50A Prime is available in 4/64 and 4/128 GB.

=== Software ===
The smartphones were released with realme UI R Edition based on Android 11 and were updated to realme UI T Edition based on Android 13.
