= Realme 6i =

realme 6i (realme Narzo 10 in India)
- Brand: realme
- Type: Phablet
- Series: realme Narzo
- First released: 6i: March 17, 2020; 6 years ago Narzo 10: May 11, 2020; 6 years ago
- Availability by region: 6i: Worldwide; Narzo 10: India
- Predecessor: realme 5i
- Successor: realme 7i realme narzo 20
- Related: realme 6 realme 6 Pro realme Narzo 10A
- Compatible networks: GSM, 3G, 4G (LTE)
- Form factor: Monoblock
- Colors: 9i: White Milk, Green Tea, Blue Soda narzo 10: That White, That Green
- Dimensions: 162.1×74.8×8.9 mm (6.38×2.94×0.35 in)
- Weight: 199 g (7 oz)
- Operating system: Initial: Android 10 with realme UI 1 Current: Android 11 with realme UI 2
- CPU: MediaTek MT6785 Helio G80 (12 nm), octa-core (2×2.0 GHz Cortex-A75 & 6×1.8 GHz Cortex-A55)
- GPU: Mali-G76 MC4
- Memory: 6i: 3/4 GB; Narzo 10: 4 GB; LPDDR4X
- Storage: 6i: 64/128 GB; Narzo 10: 128 GB eMMC 5.1
- Removable storage: MicroSDXC up to 256 GB
- Battery: Non-removable Li-Po 5000 mAh; 18 W fast charging, reverse charging (5W)
- Rear camera: 48 MP, f/1.8, 26 mm (wide), 1/2.0", 0.8 μm, PDAF + 8 MP, f/2.3, 13 mm, 119˚ (ultrawide), 1/4.0", 1.12 μm + 2 MP, f/2.4 (macro) + 2 MP B/W, f/2.4 LED flash, HDR, panorama Video: 1080p@30fps, gyro-EIS
- Front camera: 16 MP, f/2.0, 26 mm (wide), 1/3.06", 1.0 μm HDR, panorama 1080p@30fps
- Display: IPS LCD, 6.5", 1600 × 720 (HD+), 20:9, 269 ppi
- Connectivity: USB-C 2.0, 3.5 mm Audio, Bluetooth 5.0 (A2DP, LE), NFC (6i; region dependent), FM radio, Wi-Fi 802.11 b/g/n (Wi-Fi Direct, hotspot), GPS, A-GPS, GLONASS, BeiDou
- Other: Fingerprint sensor (rear-mounted), accelerometer, gyroscope, proximity sensor, compass
- Website: www.realme.com/eu/realme-6i

The realme 6i is a mid-range smartphone developed and manufactured by realme. It was first announced on 17 March 2020. In India, it was rebranded as the realme Narzo 10 on May 11, with a single memory configuration of 4/128 GB and does not support an NFC module.

== Specifications ==
=== Design ===
The screen is protected with Corning Gorilla Glass 3.

The display is made of IPS LCD sizing at 6.5", with an HD+ resolution of 1600 × 720 (20:9 ratio) and a pixel density at 399 ppi. A reviewer notices that the display isn't suitable with sunlight.

=== Hardware ===
Both smartphones powered by a MediaTek Helio G80 processor and a Mali-G52 MC2 graphics processor.

Its battery is a non-removable 5000 mAh, and supports 18W fast charging.

Both smartphones feature a main quad camera with auto focus, coming with:

- 48 MP at f/1.8 (main/wide angle)
- 8 MP at f/2.3 (ultra-wide-angle)
- Two 2 MP cameras, macro and black and white at f/2.4

The front camera features a waterdrop design and a 16 MP resolution at f/2.0. Both the main and front cameras can record a 1080p video at 30 fps.

The memory configurations differ from the model:

- The realme 6i was sold in 3/64, 4/64 and 4/128 GB configurations.
- The realme Narzo 10 was sold only in 4/128 GB configuration.

A microSD card is expandable up to 256GB.

=== Software ===
Both smartphones are released on realme UI 1 based on Android 10. It was updated to realme UI 2 based on Android 11.
