= Realme Note 60 =

Android smartphones manufactued by realme

realme Note 60 (realme C61 / Narzo N61 in India) realme Note 60x
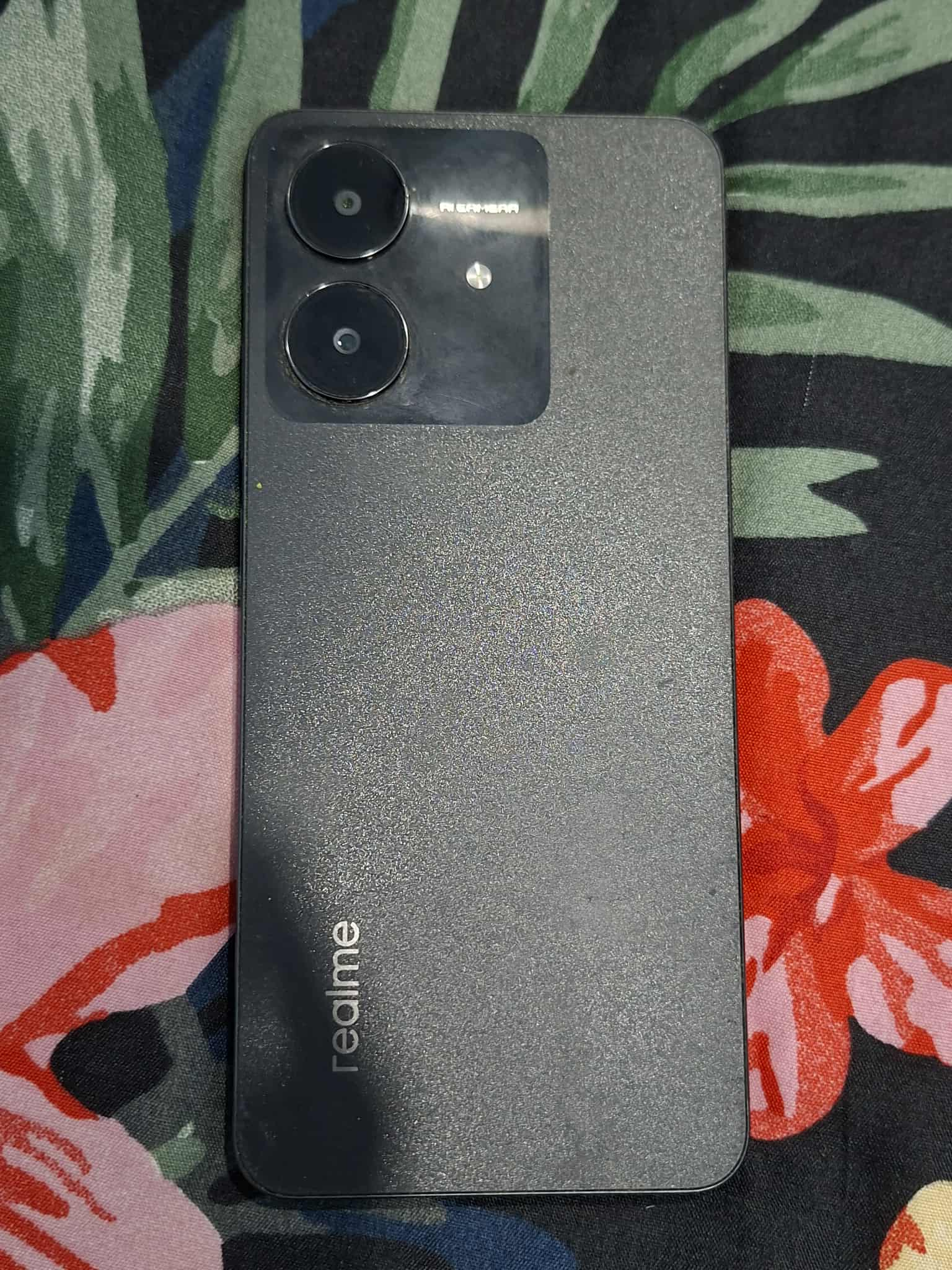
- realme Note 60x
- Brand: Realme
- Developer: Realme
- Type: Smartphone
- Series: Realme Note / C / Narzo series
- Availability by region: realme C61: June 28, 2024; Note 60 / Narzo N61: August 2024; Note 60x: Philippines: December 10, 2024
- Predecessor: realme Note 50
- Successor: realme Note 70
- Related: Realme C61 (Global version)
- Compatible networks: GSM / HSPA / LTE
- Form factor: Slate
- Colors: Note 60 / Narzo N61: Voyage Blue, Marble Black; Note 60x: Wilderness Green, Marble Black realme C61: Safari Green, Marble Black
- Dimensions: 167.3×76.7×7.8 mm (6.59×3.02×0.31 in)
- Weight: 187 g (6.60 oz)
- Operating system: Android 14 with Realme UI 5.0
- System-on-chip: Unisoc Tiger T612 (12 nm)
- CPU: Octa-core (2×1.8 GHz Cortex-A75 & 6×1.8 GHz Cortex-A55)
- GPU: Mali-G57
- Memory: 4 GB or 6 GB LPDDR4X RAM
- Storage: 64 GB, 128 GB, or 256 GB
- Removable storage: microSDXC (dedicated slot)
- Battery: 5000 mAh Li-Po (non-removable)
- Charging: 10W wired
- Rear camera: Note 60: 32 MP "Super Clear", f/1.8, (wide), PDAF + auxiliary lens Note 60x: 8 MP (wide), PDAF + auxiliary lens LED flash, panorama, HDR; Video: 480/720/1080p @ 30fps
- Front camera: 5 MP, f/2.2, (wide), 720p@30fps video
- Display: 6.74 in (171 mm) IPS LCD, 90Hz, 450 nits (typ), 560 nits (HBM); 720 × 1600 pixels, 20:9 ratio (~260 ppi density)
- Sound: Loudspeaker, 3.5mm audio jack
- Connectivity: Wi-Fi 802.11 a/b/g/n/ac, dual-band Bluetooth 5.0, A2DP, LE; GPS, GLONASS, GALILEO, BDS; USB Type-C 2.0, OTG
- Data inputs: Capacitive touchscreen, multi-touch, digital compass, proximity sensor, accelerometer, side-mounted fingerprint scanner
- Water resistance: IP64 rating (Note 60); IP54 rating (Note 60x)

The realme Note 60 and realme Note 60x are Android entry-level smartphones developed, marketed, and released by realme in August 2024 and in December 2024 for the Note 60x.

In India, it was rebranded as the realme C61 (not to be confused with the global version) and realme Narzo N61 in India, released on June 28 for the C61 and in August 2024 for the Narzo N61.

== Specifications ==
=== Design ===
The front is made of glass and the back anf frames were made of plastic. It was also equipped by an IP64 dust and splash resistance, while the Note 60x has a lower IP54 resistance. Besided to this, it will also have an ArmorShell feature for protection.

=== Hardware ===
Both models feature the Unisoc Tiger T612 with a built-in 12 mm processor under its octa-core composed of two 1.8 GHz Cortex-A75 cores and six 6x1.8 GHz Cortex-A55 cores. It also has a 5,000 mAh battery with 10-watt standard charging.

For the interal memory, it has a 64, 128, or a 256-gigabyte internal storage and a RAM of 3, 4, 6, or 8 gigabytes. The Note 60x does not support 256 gigabytes of internal storage.

=== Display ===
Externally in the front, it was housed by a 6.74-inch IPS LCD display with a resolution of 720 x 1600 (HD+) pixels, a 20:9 ratio, and a pixel density of 260 ppi.

=== Cameras ===
The Note60 features a 32-megapixel "Super Clear" main camera with an aperture of f/1.8, PDAF, HDR and panorama, while the Note 60x features an 8-megapixel main camera. In the front, both model receive a 5-megapixel camera.

=== Software ===
Both model were running on Android 14 mobile operating system with the Realme UI 5.0 user interface.

== Release ==
The realme Note 60 was released in Malaysia on November 29, 2024, and was available at 128GB + 12GB RAM memory configuration. In the Philippines, the Note 60x will be released on December 10, 2024. Alternatively, there is a 3GB variant with 5GB virtual RAM boost released in January 2025.
