= Realme 16 =

realme 16 series
- Brand: realme
- Manufacturer: realme
- Type: Smartphone
- Series: realme 16 series
- First released: January 29, 2026 (realme 16 5G; global debut)
- Predecessor: realme 15 series
- Compatible networks: 5G
- Form factor: Slate smartphone
- Colors: 16T: Aurora Green, Starlight Black; 16: Air White, Air Black; 16 Pro: Pebble Grey, Orchid Purple, Master Gold; Harry Potter Edition; 16 Pro+: Master Gold, Master Grey, Camellia Pink
- Dimensions: 16T: 166.47 × 78.23 × 8.88 mm 16: 158.30 × 75.13 × 8.10 mm 16 Pro: 162.60 × 77.60 × 7.75–7.79 mm 16 Pro+: 162.45 × 76.27 × 8.49 mm
- Weight: 16T: 224 g 16: 183 g 16 Pro: 192 g 16 Pro+: 198 g (Camellia Pink); 203 g (Master Grey and Master Gold)
- Operating system: realme UI 7.0
- System-on-chip: 16T: MediaTek Dimensity 6300; 16: MediaTek Dimensity 6400 Turbo; 16 Pro: MediaTek Dimensity 7300 Max 5G; 16 Pro+: Qualcomm Snapdragon 7 Gen 4
- CPU: Octa-core
- GPU: 16T: ARM Mali-G57 MC2; 16: Mali-G57 MC2; 16 Pro: Arm Mali-G615; 16 Pro+: Adreno 722
- Memory: 16T: 6/8 GB LPDDR4X; 16/16 Pro: 8/12 GB LPDDR4X; 16 Pro+: 8/12 GB LPDDR5X
- Storage: 16T: 256 GB UFS 2.2; 16: 128/256/512 GB UFS 2.2; 16 Pro/16 Pro+: 256/512 GB UFS 3.1
- Removable storage: 16T and 16: supported 16 Pro and 16 Pro+: unsupported
- SIM: Nano-SIM; eSIM availability varies by model and region
- Battery: 16T: 8,000 mAh; 16/16 Pro/16 Pro+: 7,000 mAh typical (regional variants differ)
- Charging: 16T: 45 W SUPERVOOC; 16: up to 60 W 16 Pro/16 Pro+: up to 80 W
- Rear camera: 16T/16: 50 MP wide + 2 MP monochrome 16 Pro: 200 MP wide + 8 MP ultrawide 16 Pro+: 200 MP wide + 8 MP ultrawide + 50 MP telephoto
- Front camera: 16T: 16 MP; 16/16 Pro/16 Pro+: 50 MP
- Display: 16T: 6.8-inch LCD; 144 Hz; 16: 6.57-inch AMOLED; 120 Hz; 16 Pro: 6.78-inch AMOLED; 144 Hz; 16 Pro+: 6.8-inch AMOLED; 144 Hz
- Sound: USB-C audio; Bluetooth audio
- Connectivity: Wi-Fi, Bluetooth, USB-C and NFC availability varies by model and region
- Data inputs: Capacitive touchscreen, fingerprint sensor, facial recognition
- Website: Official website

The realme 16 series is a lineup of Android-based mid-range and upper-mid-range smartphones manufactured by realme. The series succeeds to the realme 15 series and comprises four primary models the standard realme 16 5G, the realme 16T 5G, and two upper-tier models, the realme 16 Pro 5G and realme 16 Pro+ 5G, and one themed variant, the realme 16 Pro 5G Harry Potter Edition.

The realme 16 5G made its debut in Vietnam on January 29, 2026, followed by a launch in India on April 2, 2026. As of September 2026, the device is available across key markets in Southeast Asia, South Asia, as well as select countries in Europe and Latin America.

== Display ==
The display panels across the lineup differ for different models. The realme 16 5G is equipped with a 6.57-inch flexible AMOLED panel with an up to 120 Hz refresh rate and up to 4,200 nits peak brightness. The realme 16 Pro 5G and Pro+ 5G incorporate 1.5K AMOLED panels operating at up to 144 Hz, achieving up to 6,500 nits peak brightness. The Pro+ panel also features 4,608 Hz high-frequency PWM dimming and Corning Gorilla Glass 7i protection. The realme 16T 5G has a 6.80-inch HD+ LCD panel operating at a 144 Hz refresh rate with 1,200 nits (HBM).

Model	Panel type and size	Resolution	Peak brightness	Protection glass
realme 16T 5G	6.80-inch LCD	HD+ (1570 × 720)	1,200 nits (HBM)	Panda-1681
realme 16 5G	6.57-inch flexible AMOLED	FHD+ (2372 × 1080)	4,200 nits	DT Star D+
realme 16 Pro 5G	6.78-inch AMOLED	1.5K (1272 × 2772)	6,500 nits	AGC DT Star D+
realme 16 Pro+ 5G	6.80-inch curved AMOLED	1.5K (1280 × 2800)	6,500 nits	Corning Gorilla Glass 7i

== Design ==
All four variants carry multi-standard ingress protection ratings meeting IP66, IP68, IP69, and IP69K standards, providing resistance against liquid submersion. All model have native underwater camera shooting software. The 16T 5G is certified for MIL-STD-810H shock resistance against drops.

Model	Dimensions & Weight	Rear Materials / Finish
realme 16T 5G	166.4 × 78.2 × 8.88 mm; 224 g	Aluminum lens module, flat frame
realme 16 5G	158.3 × 75.1 × 8.10 mm; 183 g	Aurora Wings gradient back
realme 16 Pro 5G	162.6 × 77.6 × 7.8 mm; 192 g	Matte metal deco, polymer back
realme 16 Pro+ 5G	162.5 × 76.3 × 8.1 mm; 198 g (Camellia Pink) 162.5 × 76.3 × 8.5 mm; 203 g (Master Grey, Master Gold); 162.5 × 76.3 × 8.5 mm; 198 g (Europe version, Master Grey, Master Gold)	Bio-based organic silicone, curved body

== Hardware, performance, and battery ==
The realme 16 series uses system-on-chip (SoC) platforms from MediaTek and Qualcomm. The realme 16 5G is powered by the MediaTek Dimensity 6400 Turbo, while the realme 16T 5G uses the Dimensity 6300. The realme 16 Pro 5G uses the Dimensity 7300-Max, and the realme 16 Pro+ 5G is equipped with the Qualcomm Snapdragon 7 Gen 4. The realme 16 5G also incorporates a vapor chamber measuring 6,050 mm² for heat dissipation, while the 16T 5G uses a 5,300 mm² vapor chamber.

The realme 16 5G, 16 Pro 5G, and 16 Pro+ 5G have typical battery capacities of 7,000 mAh, while the 16T 5G has an 8,000 mAh battery. The European version of the 16 Pro 5G has a smaller 6,500 mAh battery and supports 45 W fast charging. Charging speeds vary across the range: the 16 5G supports up to 60 W, the 16T 5G up to 45 W, and the Pro and Pro+ models up to 80 W.

== Cameras ==
The camera configurations vary between dual-sensor setups, high-resolution sensors, and multi-lens telephoto systems for realme 16 models. The 16 Pro and Pro+ feature a primary 200MP Samsung HP5 sensor (1/1.56", OIS) integrated with portrait tuning algorithms, an 8MP ultrawide lens, and a 50MP front camera.

The 16 5G and 16T 5G feature a 50MP Sony IMX852 primary sensor paired with a 2MP monochrome camera. The 16 5G uses a 50MP front-facing camera, while the 16T 5G is equipped with a 16MP sensor. Both the standard 16 and 16T include a physical rear mirror component and gesture-triggered countdowns to assist framing self-portraits using the primary rear sensor.

== Special Edition: realme 16 Pro 5G Harry Potter Edition ==
The realme 16 Pro 5G Harry Potter Edition is a themed variant of the realme 16 Pro 5G developed around the Harry Potter franchise. It features a Hedwig-inspired aluminium camera decoration, a Hogwarts-themed rear design and customized software elements, including wallpapers, boot and fingerprint animations, and redesigned app icons. The edition is supplied with themed packaging and accessories.

The accompanying realme Buds T500 Pro Harry Potter Edition is a themed version of the realme Buds T500 Pro wireless earbuds. It has the standard model's core hardware specifications with Hogwarts-inspired styling, a trunk-style protective case, a matching lanyard, customized pairing animations and themed sound effects.

== Software and artificial intelligence ==
The realme 16 series runs realme UI 7.0, based on Android 16. The interface includes translucent visual elements and system-level performance optimizations. Software features include built-in image and video editing tools, including options for clipping videos, removing objects from images, and adjusting portrait lighting. The camera software also provides colour profiles for modifying image appearance under different lighting conditions.

The realme 16 Pro 5G and realme 16 Pro+ 5G integrate Google Gemini Live, which supports interactive conversations and contextual assistance using camera input and screen sharing. The devices also include voice recording and transcription features.
