= Realme 3 =

Chinese smartphone

realme 3 realme 3 Pro realme 3i
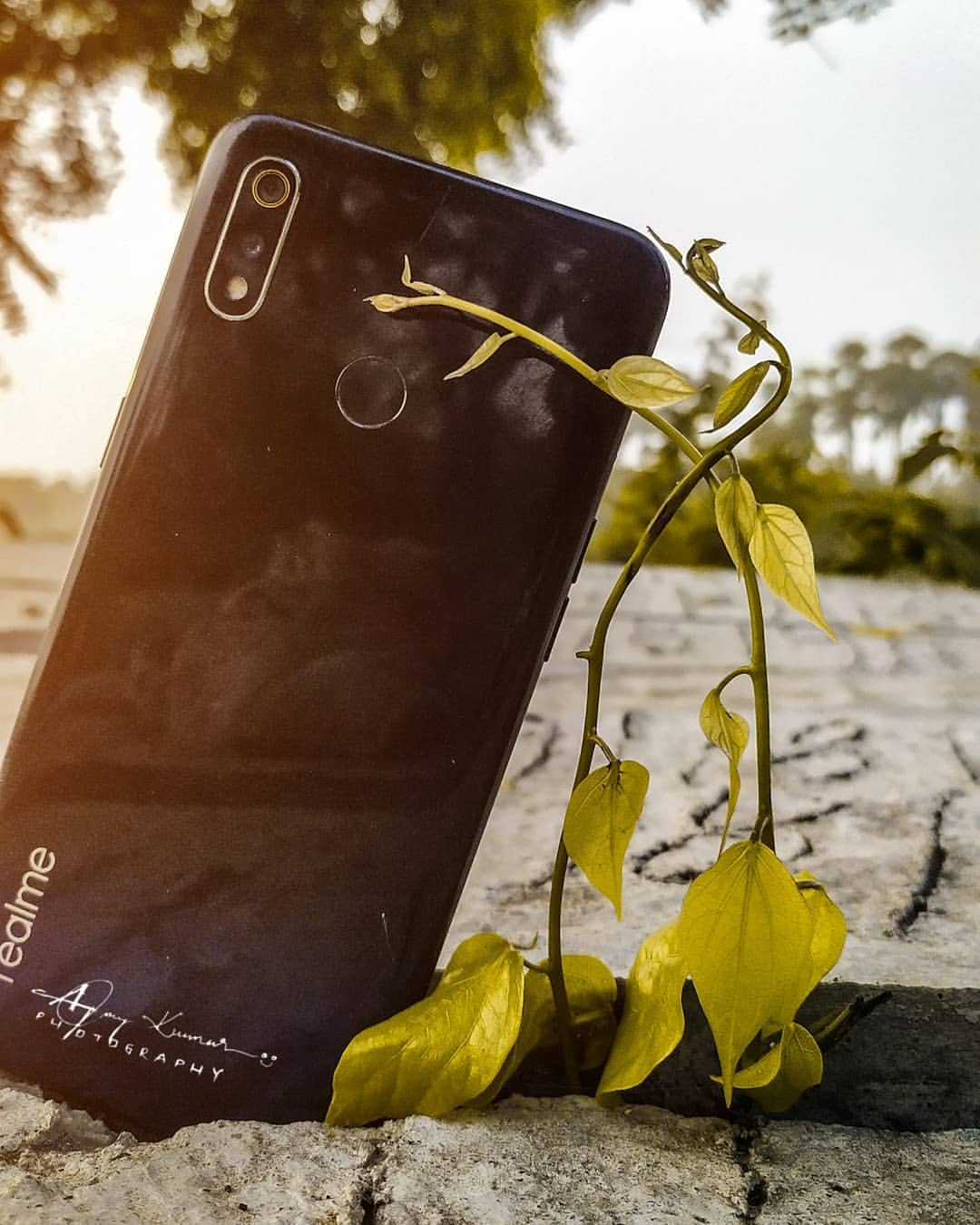
- Brand: realme
- Type: Smartphone
- First released: March 4, 2019; 7 years ago (realme 3); April 22, 2019; 7 years ago (realme 3 pro); July 15, 2019; 6 years ago (realme 3i)
- Predecessor: realme 2 realme 2 Pro
- Successor: realme 5 realme 5i realme 5 Pro
- Compatible networks: GSM, WCDMA, FDD-LTE, TD-LTE
- Form factor: Slate
- Dimensions: H: 156.1 mm (6.15 in) W: 75.6 mm (2.98 in) D: 8.3 mm (0.33 in) (realme 3/3i); H: 156.8 mm (6.17 in) W: 74.2 mm (2.92 in) D: 8.3 mm (0.33 in) (realme 3 pro)
- Weight: 175 g (6.2 oz) (realme 3/3i); 172 g (6.1 oz) (realme 3 pro)
- Operating system: Android 9 Pie ColorOS 6 Upgraded to Android 10 realme UI 1.0 (for realme 3/3i/3 pro); Android 10 realme UI 1.0 Upgraded to Android 11 realme UI 2.0 (for realme 3 pro)
- System-on-chip: MediaTek Helio P60 (International Edition) MediaTek Helio and P70 (India Edition) (realme 3/3i); Qualcomm SDM710 Snapdragon 710 (realme 3 pro)
- CPU: ARM Cortex-A73x4 and ARM Cortex-A53x4 up to 2.1 GHz (realme 3/3i); Octa-core (2x2.2 GHz Kryo 360 Gold & 6x1.7 GHz Kryo 360 Silver) (realme 3 pro)
- GPU: ARM Mali-G72 MP4 (realme 3/3i); Adreno 616 (realme 3 pro)
- Storage: 3GB + 32GB/64GB or 4GB + 64GB or 4GB/6GB + 128GB
- Removable storage: Up to 256 GB external storage
- Battery: 4,230 mAh Li-Ion
- Rear camera: 13 MP main camera (f/1.8, Hybrid HDR Nightscape) + 2 MP, PDAF Fast Focusing, Video 1080p or 720p at 30 fps (realme 3/3i); 16 MP main camera (f/1.7, 1/2.6", 1.22 μm, Dual Pixel PDAF HDR Nightscape) + 5 MP, PDAF Fast Focusing, Video 4K 30fps, 1080p 30/120fps, 720p 960fps, gyro-EIS (realme 3 pro)
- Front camera: 13 MP AI front camera (realme 3/3i); 25 MP AI front camera (realme 3 pro)
- Display: 6.22 in (158 mm) (1520 ×720 pixels) HD+ with 19:9 aspect ratio (realme 3); 6.3 in (160 mm) (2340 ×1080 pixels) HD+ with 19,5:9 aspect ratio (realme 3 pro); 6.2 in (160 mm) (1520 ×720 pixels) HD+ with 19:9 aspect ratio (realme 3i)
- Sound: 3.5mm jack loudspeaker
- Connectivity: All models: Triple Slots / dual nano-SIM; microSD expansion / Dual VoLTE; Wi-Fi: 802.11b/g/n, 2.4GHz; Bluetooth: Bluetooth 4.2 (realme 3/3i) and Bluetooth 5 (realme 3 pro); GPS: GPS/A-GPS/Gnolass; USB Type: Micro-USB; Audio Jack: 3.5mm
- Website: www.realme.com/in/realme3 www.realme.com/in/realme-3i www.realme.com/in/realme-3-pro

The realme 3 series is a smartphone from the Indian-based Chinese company realme, in March 2019. The realme 3 pro was released later that year in May. After the release of Realme 3, finally Realme 3i was released in the middle of that year in July.

== Specifications ==
=== Hardware ===
Realme 3 utilises Gradient Unibody Design, with matched color. It is equipped with MediaTek Helio P60 (International Edition) or P70 (India Edition) processors. It is equipped with a 4230 mAh battery. The Realme 3 has an improved hardware configuration over the previous models, and its rear dual camera has been upgraded to a combination 13 MP main camera + 2 MP secondary camera, with the primary camera's single-pixel size being 1.12 um, with a f/1.8 aperture and 5P lenses.

Realme 3 features a 6.2-inch (158 mm) 1520×720 pixel HD+ screen with an aspect ratio of 19:9. The display is covered by a single pane of Corning Glass. It is equipped with a Li-Po 4,230 mAh battery. Realme 3 has included a loudspeaker and a 3.5 mm audio jack.

This model is built with a significant upgrade over its predecessors, realme 1 and realme 2.

=== Software ===
Realme 3 comes equipped with the ColorOS 6.0 and borderless design. It has improved more than 20 system functions over the realme 2, based on user suggestions and feedback from social media and the realme community.

Realme 3 is also the first model in its segment with hand-held night mode, AI technology, multi-frame synthesis, and anti-shake algorithms, the camera's imaging level in dark lighting conditions is improved from the previous model, Realme 2. Its Chroma Boost mode uses AI technology to identify objects and optimize photos and improve images’ overall dynamic range with richer details in highlights and shadows and more balanced exposure.

Stat	Realme 3	Realme 3 Pro
Price	£135	£170
Operating System	Android 9 Pie (upgradable to Android 10)	
Display Size	6.22 inches (96.6 cm)	6.3 inches (97.4 cm)
Display Resolution	720p @ 19:9	1080p @ 19.5:9
Processor	MediaTek Helio P60 (P70) octa-core	Snapdragon 710 octa-core
Graphics	Mali-G72 MP3	Adreno 616
RAM	3 GB/4 GB	4 GB/6 GB
Storage	32 GB/64 GB	64 GB/128 GB
Wi-Fi	802.11 b/g/n	Dual-band 802.11 a/b/g/n/ac
Bluetooth	4.2	5
GPS	A-GPS, GLONASS	
Fingerprint Scanner	Yes, Rear	
Rear Camera Stills	13 MP f/1.8 + 2 MP (depth)	16 MP f/1.7 Dual Pixel + 5 MP f/2.4 (depth)
Rear Camera Video	1080p @ 30 fps	4K @ 30 fps 1080p @ 30/120 fps 720p @ 960 fps gyro-EIS
Rear Flash	Yes	
Front Camera	13 MP f/2.0 1080p @ 30 fps	25 MP f/2.0 1080p @ 30 fps
Audio	Loudspeaker + 3.5 mm jack	
Battery	4230 mAh non-removable	4045 mAh non-removable
Charging	10 W microUSB 2.0	Fast charging 20 W, VOOC 3.0 microUSB 2.0
Dimensions (mm)	156.1 x 75.6 x 8.3	156.8 x 74.2 x 8.3
