= Realme Note 50 =

Android entry-level smartphone

- Brand: Realme
- Manufacturer: Realme
- Type: Smartphone
- Series: Realme Note series
- Availability by region: January 23, 2024 (Philippines)
- Successor: Realme Note 60
- Form factor: Slate
- Colors: Sky Blue, Midnight Black
- Dimensions: 167.2 mm × 76.7 mm × 8 mm (6.58 in × 3.02 in × 0.31 in)
- Weight: 186 g (6.6 oz)
- Operating system: Android 13 with Realme UI T
- System-on-chip: Unisoc Tiger T612 (12 nm)
- CPU: Octa-core (2x1.8 GHz Cortex-A75 & 6x1.8 GHz Cortex-A55)
- GPU: Mali-G57
- Memory: 3 GB or 4 GB RAM
- Storage: 64 GB, 128 GB, or 256 GB eMMC 5.1
- Removable storage: microSDXC (dedicated slot)
- SIM: Dual SIM (Nano-SIM, dual stand-by)
- Battery: 5000 mAh non-removable Li-Po
- Charging: 10W wired
- Rear camera: 13 MP, f/2.2, 25mm (wide), PDAF + auxiliary lens LED flash, HDR, panorama Video: 1080p@30fps
- Front camera: 5 MP, f/2.2, 27mm (wide); HDR; Video: 720p@30fps
- Display: 6.74 in (171 mm) IPS LCD, 90Hz, 560 nits (peak); Resolution: 720 × 1600 pixels, 20:9 ratio (~260 ppi density)
- Sound: Loudspeaker, 3.5mm jack
- Connectivity: Wi-Fi 802.11 a/b/g/n/ac, dual-band Bluetooth 5.0, A2DP, LE; GPS, GLONASS, GALILEO; USB Type-C 2.0
- Data inputs: Fingerprint (side-mounted), accelerometer, proximity, compass
- Water resistance: IP54 dust protected and water resistant
- Model: RMX3834
- Website: https://www.realme.com/ph/realme-note50

The relame Note 50 is an entry-level Android smartphone manufactured and marketed by realme. It was released on January 23, 2024, in the Philippines, followed by the 4GB + 128GB on February 21 with that year.

== Specifications ==
=== Appearance ===
The appearance of the device was similar to the realme C51 with its matte finish at the bottom and a glossy finish at the top. It was available at Sky Blue and Midnight Black color options. It was also integrated by a built-in IP54 splash-and-dust resistance.

=== Hardware ===
The Note 60 was powered by the Unisoc Tiger T612 processor under its onta-core composed with two 1.8 GHz Cortex-A75 cores & six 1.8 GHz Cortex-A55 cores and a Mali-G57 graphics processor. It has a battery capacity of 5,000 mAh with 10-watt standard charging.

The Note 60 has an internal storage of 64, 128, or 256 gigabytes and a RAM of 3 or 4 gigabytes.

Externally it was housed by 6.74-inch IPS LCD display with a refresh rate of 90 Hz, a touch sampling rate of 180 Hz, a resolution of 720 × 1600 pixels, and a pixel density of 260 ppi.

On the rear, the Note 60 carries a 13-megapixel (wide) main lens with an aperture of f/2.2, HDR, LED flash, a panorama, and a video resolution up to 1080p @ 30 fps. The Note 60 also has a front camera of 5MP with an aperture of f/2.2 and video recording up to 720p @ 30 fps.

=== Software ===
The Note 50 runs on Android 13 with the realme UI T interface. It was updated to Android 15 with 3 years of security updates that includes “minor software updates”.
