= Realme C25 =

Line of budget smartphones by Realme

realme C25 realme C25s realme narzo 30A realme narzo 50A
- Developer: Realme
- Manufacturer: Oppo
- Type: Phablet
- Series: C/narzo
- First released: narzo 30A: February 24, 2021; 5 years ago C25: March 23, 2021; 5 years ago C25s: June 8, 2021; 5 years ago narzo 50A: September 24, 2021; 4 years ago
- Predecessor: Realme C15 realme narzo 20A
- Successor: Realme C35
- Related: Realme C20; Realme C21 realme Narzo 30 realme Narzo 30 5G
- Compatible networks: GSM, 3G, 4G (LTE)
- Form factor: Slate
- Dimensions: C25 & C25s & narzo 50A: 164.5 × 75.9 × 9.6 mm narzo 30A: 164.5 × 75.9 × 9.8 mm
- Weight: C25 & C25s: 209 g narzo 30A: 205 g narzo 50A: 207 g
- Operating system: Initial: narzo 30A: Android 10 + realme UI 1 C25 & C25s & narzo 50A: Android 11 + realme UI 2 Current: Android 11 + realme UI 2
- CPU: C25: MediaTek MT6762 Helio G70 (12 nm), octa-core (2×2.0 GHz Cortex-A75 & 6×1.7 GHz Cortex-A55); C25s & narzo 30A & narzo 50A: MediaTek MT6762 Helio G85 (12 nm), octa-core (2×2.0 GHz Cortex-A75 & 6×1.8 GHz Cortex-A55)
- GPU: C25: Mali-G52 2EEMC2; C25s & narzo 30A & narzo 50A: Mali-G52 MC2
- Memory: C25 & C25s & narzo 50A: 4 GB narzo 30A: 3/4 GB; LPDDR4X
- Storage: C25 & C25s & narzo 50A: 64/128 GB narzo 30A: 32/64 GB eMMC 5.1
- Removable storage: MicroSDXC up to 256 GB
- Battery: Non-removable, Li-Po 6000 mAh
- Charging: 18W Fast charging, reverse charging
- Rear camera: C25 & C25s (Global): 48 MP, f/1.8, 26 mm (wide), PDAF + 2 MP, f/2.4 (B/W), 1/5.0", 1.75 µm + 2 MP, f/2.4, (macro), 1/5.0", 1.75 µm C25 & C25s (India): 13 MP, f/2.2, 26 mm (wide), 1.12 µm, PDAF + 2 MP, f/2.4 (B/W), 1/5.0", 1.75 µm + 2 MP, f/2.4, (macro), 1/5.0", 1.75 µm narzo 30A: 13 MP, f/2.2, 26 mm (wide), 1.12 µm, PDAF + 2 MP, f/2.4 (B/W), 1/5.0", 1.75 µm narzo 50A: 50 MP, f/1.8 (wide), PDAF + 2 MP, f/2.4 (B/W), 1/5.0", 1.75 µm + 2 MP, f/2.4, (macro), 1/5.0", 1.75 µm LED flash, HDR, panorama Video: 1080p@30/60fps (except narzo 30A)
- Front camera: 8 MP, f/2.0, 26 mm (wide), 1/4.0", 1.12 µm HDR, panorama Video: 1080p@30fps
- Display: IPS LCD, 6.5", 1600 × 720 (HD+), 20:9, 270 ppi
- Connectivity: USB-C 2.0, 3.5 mm Audio jack, Bluetooth 5.0 (A2DP, LE), NFC (region dependent), FM radio, Wi-Fi 802.11 a/b/g/n/ac (dual-band, Wi-Fi Direct, hotspot), GPS, A-GPS, GLONASS, BeiDou
- Data inputs: Fingerprint scanner (rear-mounted), accelerometer, proximity sensor, compass

The realme C25 and realme C25s are entry-level Android smartphones developed, marketed, and designed by Realme, as part of the C series. The C25 was introduced on March 23, 2021, and the C25s followed on June 8, 2021.

The primary difference between the models lies in their processor. Indian editions of the smartphones also differ from global variants in their main camera module configuration.

Additionally, several closely related models were released under the "narzo" sub-series:

- realme narzo 30A – a variant structurally similar to the realme C25s but featuring a redesigned rear panel and omitting the macro camera. It serves as the successor to the realme narzo 20A.
- realme narzo 50A – a variant similar to the realme C25s with an altered rear aesthetic and main camera module arrangement.

The realme C25, alongside the C21 and C20, was officially launched in India on April 8, 2021 for India. It was also launched in the Philippines on April 15 at that year positioned as an affordable entry-level smartphone.

The Narzo 30A was released in the Philippines on March 25, 2021 via digital livestream. It is the second Narzo-branded device to enter the Philippine market following the Narzo 20.

== Design ==
The front display is constructed from glass, while the unibody chassis is made of matte plastic.

The external designs of the realme C25 and C25s are identical. In contrast, the narzo 30A distinguishes itself with a textured, striped pattern covering the lower two-thirds of the back cover, a prominent "narzo" logo, and an "AI" badge marking the space where the macro lens is absent on other variants. The narzo 50A features a unified rear island that blends the camera modules, the fingerprint scanner, and the "narzo" branding into a single element, accented by a vertical striped graphic beneath it.

The bottom edge houses a USB-C port, main loudspeaker, microphone, and a 3.5 mm audio jack. The left-hand side features a triple-slot tray accommodating two SIM cards alongside a dedicated MicroSD expansion card slot supporting up to 256 GB. The right side holds the physical volume rocker and power/sleep key. The biometric fingerprint scanner is positioned on the back plate.

The realme C25 and C25s are available in Water Blue and Water Gray color finishes.

The realme narzo 30A is sold in Laser Blue and Laser Black finishes.

The realme narzo 50A is sold in Oxygen Blue and Oxygen Green finishes.

== Specifications ==
=== Hardware ===
The C25 utilizes a MediaTek Helio G70 system-on-chip coupled with a Mali-G52 2EEMC2 graphics processor.

The C25s, narzo 30A, and narzo 50A run on the MediaTek Helio G85 chipset alongside a Mali-G52 MC2 GPU.

=== Battery ===
All models are equipped with a 6000 mAh internal battery, featuring support for 18W wired fast charging as well as reverse wired power delivery to charge external accessories.

=== Camera ===
The realme C25 and C25s incorporate a triple rear sensor array led by a 48 MP, f/1.8 lens (Global market) or a 13 MP, f/2.2 lens (Indian market) using a wide-angle field-of-view, assisted by a 2 MP, f/2.4 monochrome depth sensor and a 2 MP, f/2.4 macro camera. It features phase-detection autofocus (PDAF) and tops out at 1080p video capture at 60fps.

The realme narzo 30A carries a dual-camera system consisting of a 13 MP, f/2.2 wide-angle camera and a 2 MP, f/2.4 monochrome sensor with PDAF, capable of recording 1080p video at 30fps.

The realme narzo 50A is built with a triple rear array holding a 50 MP, f/1.8 wide-angle sensor, a 2 MP, f/2.4 monochrome sensor, and a 2 MP, f/2.4 macro sensor, capturing up to 1080p video at 60fps.

Each model shares an identical 8 MP, f/2.0 wide-angle front-facing selfie camera supporting 1080p video recording at 30fps.

=== Display ===
The phones feature a 6.5-inch IPS LCD panel with an HD+ resolution of 1600 × 720 pixels. The display adheres to a 20:9 aspect ratio with a pixel density of roughly 270 ppi, broken up by a standardized dewdrop notch accommodating the front sensor.

=== Storage and Memory ===
The realme C25, C25s, and narzo 50A are sold in 4 GB RAM setups matched with either 64 GB or 128 GB of onboard eMMC 5.1 storage.

The realme narzo 30A comes configured with either a 3 GB RAM / 32 GB storage option or a 4 GB RAM / 64 GB storage combination.

=== Software ===
The realme narzo 30A shipped natively running realme UI 1 based over Android 10. The remaining smartphones launched with realme UI 2 on top of Android 11.

== Reception ==
=== Gaming test ===
REVU.com reviewer Ramon Lopez have noted that the device offers reliable gaming performance for a budget-tier smartphone. Equipped with a MediaTek Helio G70 chipset, the phone is capable of delivering smooth gameplay in contemporary titles, provided the graphical settings are lowered.

In demanding benchmarks like Genshin Impact, the device maintains stable frame rates at low detail settings. While it can occasionally exceed 30 frames per second (fps) during gameplay, benchmarks suggest keeping the software capped below the 60 fps option for optimal stability.
