= Realme C12 =

Android entry-level smartphone

realme C12
- Developer: realme
- Manufacturer: OPPO Electronics
- Type: Phablet
- Series: C
- First released: August 14, 2020; 6 years ago
- Predecessor: realme C3
- Compatible networks: GSM, 3G, 4G (LTE)
- Form factor: Slate
- Dimensions: 164.5×75.9×9.8 mm (6.48×2.99×0.39 in)
- Weight: 209 g (7 oz)
- Operating system: Original: Android 10 with realme UI 1.0; Current: Android 11 with realme UI 2.0
- System-on-chip: MediaTek MT6762 Helio G35 (12 nm)
- CPU: Octa-core (4×2.3 GHz Cortex-A53 & 4×1.8 GHz Cortex-A53)
- GPU: PowerVR GE8320
- Memory: 3 GB LPDDR4X
- Storage: 32 GB eMMC 5.1
- Removable storage: microSDXC up to 256 GB
- Battery: Non-removable Li-Po 6000 mAh
- Charging: 10 W
- Rear camera: 13 MP, f/2.2 (wide), PDAF + 2 MP, f/2.4 (B/W), 1/5", 1.75 µm + 2 MP, f/2.4 (macro), 1/5", 1.75 µm LED flash, HDR, panorama Video: 1080p@30fps
- Front camera: 5 MP, f/2.0 (wide); HDR, panorama Video: 1080p@30fps
- Display: IPS LCD, 6.5", 1560 × 720 (HD+), 19.5:9, 264 ppi

The realme C12 is an entry-level smartphone developed by realme, featured by its large 6000 mAh battery. It was unveiled in Indonesia on August 14, 2020 and launched in India on August 18.

== Design ==
The front panel is made of glass, while the body is made of matte plastic.

At the bottom are the microUSB 2.0 port, 3.5 mm audio jack, loudspeaker, and dual microphones. On the left side is a triple-card slot supporting two SIM cards and a microSD card up to 256 GB, while the right side houses the volume rocker and power button. The back features a square camera island with an LED flash, a fingerprint scanner, and the logo.

The realme C12 was available in three colors: Marine Blue, Coral Red, and Silver.

== Specifications ==
=== Hardware ===
The realme C12 is powered by an entry-level MediaTek Helio G35 system on a chip. The smartphone has 3 GB of LPDDR4X random-access memory (RAM) and 32 GB of eMMC 5.1 internal storage.

The device features a capacity of 6000 mAh.

The realme C12 has a 6.5-inch IPS LCD display with HD+ resolution (1560 × 720 pixels), an aspect ratio of 19.5:9, a pixel density of 264 ppi, and a teardrop notch for the front camera.

The realme C12 features a triple rear camera setup with a 13 MP wide-angle lens with an f/2.2 aperture and phase-detection autofocus (PDAF), along with a 2 MP monochrome and a 2 MP macro lens, both with an f/2.4 aperture. The smartphone also has a 5 MP wide-angle front camera with an f/2.0 aperture. Both the main and front cameras are capable of recording video up to 1080p at 30fps.

=== Software ===
The realme C12 was released with realme UI 1.0 based on Android 10 and was later updated to realme UI 2.0 based on Android 11.
