= Realme 5 Pro =

Smartphone from the Chinese company realme

realme 5 Pro (realme Q in China)
- Brand: realme
- Type: Smartphone
- First released: August 20, 2019; 6 years ago
- Predecessor: Realme 3 Pro
- Successor: Realme 6 Pro; Realme Q2
- Compatible networks: GSM, HSPA, LTE
- Form factor: Slate
- Dimensions: H: 157 mm (6.2 in); W: 74.2 mm (2.92 in); D: 8.9 mm (0.35 in)
- Weight: 184 g (6.5 oz)
- Operating system: ColorOS 6.0 (based on Android Pie)
- System-on-chip: Qualcomm Snapdragon 712 AIE
- CPU: Octa-core (2x2.3 GHz Kryo 360 Gold & 6x1.7 GHz Kryo 360 Silver)
- GPU: Adreno 616
- Storage: 4GB + 64GB or 6GB + 64GB or 4GB + 128 GB or 8GB + 128GB
- Removable storage: Up to 256 GB external storage
- Battery: 4,035 mAh Li-Ion
- Rear camera: AI Quad-Camera of 48MP main camera (f/1.79, 6P lens, Super Nightscape, 48MP mode, AI scene recognition) + 8MP wide-angle camera, 2MP portrait camera, 2MP macro camera
- Front camera: 16MP front camera
- Display: 6.3 in (160 mm) (1080 ×2340 pixels) LCD multi-Touch display
- Sound: 3.5mm jack loudspeaker
- Connectivity: All models: WLAN: Wi-Fi 802.11 a/b/g/n/ac, dual-band, Wi-Fi Direct, hotspot; Bluetooth: 5.0, A2DP, LE; GPS: A-GPS, GLONASS, GALILEO, BDS; Radio: FM radio; USB: microUSB 2.0, Type-C 1.0 reversible connector, USB On-The-Go
- Website: www.realme.com/in/realme-5-pro

Realme 5 Pro is a smartphone from the Chinese manufacture realme, released in 2019. This model comes with a significant upgrade over its predecessor realme 3 series.

== Design ==
The screen is made of Corning Gorilla Glass 3+. The body case is made of plastic.

== Specifications ==
=== Hardware ===
The Realme 5 Pro is powered by the Qualcomm Snapdragon 712 AIE octa-core processor (2×2.3 GHz Kryo 360 Gold & 6×1.7 GHz Kryo 360 Silver) and the Adreno 616 GPU.

The battery is 4,035 mAh; a 20W (5V/4A) VOOC 3.0 fast charger is included in the box.

The device has 4, 6 or 8 GB of RAM with 64 GB or 128 GB of internal storage.

==== Camera ====
Realme 5 Pro has four rear cameras. The primary camera is a 48MP sensor which can record 4K video. The second camera is an 8MP sensor with ultrawide viewing angle. The other two sensors are 2MP: one sensor aids in capturing macro images, while the other assists in capturing portrait images. Both have an aperture of f/2.0 and can record Full HD video.

=== Software ===
The Realme 5 Pro runs ColorOS 6, with features like Game Assist, Game Space, Smart Driving modes and Clone Apps. The software also includes DRM L1 certification and supports HD streaming from apps like Netflix and Prime Videos.
