= Realme C20 =

2021 smartphone by realme

realme C20 (realme C20A in Bangladesh) realme C11 2021 realme narzo 50i
- Brand: realme
- Type: Phablet
- Series: C/narzo
- First released: C20: January 19, 2021; 5 years ago C20A: May 11, 2021; 5 years ago C11 2021: June 28, 2021; 5 years ago narzo 50i: September 24, 2021; 4 years ago
- Predecessor: realme C11
- Successor: realme C30
- Related: realme C21 realme C25
- Compatible networks: GSM, 3G, 4G (LTE)
- Form factor: Slate
- Dimensions: 165.2×76.4×8.9 mm (6.50×3.01×0.35 in)
- Weight: C20 & 11 2021: 190 g narzo 50i: 195 g
- Operating system: C20: Android 10 + realme UI 1 C11 2021 & narzo 50i: Android 11 + realme UI Go Edition (Android Go)
- CPU: C20: MediaTek MT6762 Helio G35 (12 nm), Octa-core (4×2.3 GHz Cortex-A53 & 4×1.8 GHz Cortex-A53); C11 2021 & narzo 50i: Unisoc SC9863A (28 nm), Octa-core (4×1.6 GHz Cortex-A55 & 4×1.2 GHz Cortex-A55)
- GPU: C20: PowerVR GE8320; C11 2021 & narzo 50i: IMG8322
- Memory: C20 & 11 2021: 2 GB narzo 50i: 2/4 GB; LPDDR4X
- Storage: C20 & 11 2021: 32 GB narzo 50i: 32/64 GB eMMC 5.1
- Removable storage: microSDXC up to 256 GB
- Battery: Non-removable, Li-Po 5000 mAh
- Charging: 10 W, reverse charging
- Rear camera: 8 MP, f/2.0 (wide-angle), 1/4.0", 1.12 μm, AF; LED flash, HDR, panorama Video: 1080p@30fps
- Front camera: 5 MP, f/2.2 (wide-angle), 1/5.0", 1.12 μm HDR; Video: 1080p@30fps
- Display: IPS LCD, 6.5", 1600 × 720 (HD+), 20:9, 270 ppi
- Connectivity: microUSB 2.0, 3.5 mm Audio, Bluetooth 5.1 (C20)/4.2 (C11 2021 & narzo 50i) (A2DP, LE (C20)), FM radio, Wi-Fi 802.11 a (C20)b/g/n/ac (C20) (dual-band (C20), Wi-Fi Direct (C20), hotspot), GPS, A-GPS, GLONASS, Galileo (C11 2021 & narzo 50i), BeiDou
- Data inputs: Accelerometer, proximity sensor, compass, splash-resistant coating

The realme C20 is an entry-level smartphone manufactured by realme. It was announced on January 19, 2021.

On May 11 of the same year, the smartphone was introduced in Bangladesh under the name realme C20A. Also, on June 28 of the same year, the realme C11 2021 was introduced, positioned as a new version of the realme C11 and a simplified model of the realme C20.

On September 24 of the same year, alongside the realme narzo 50A, the realme narzo 50i was introduced, which differs from the realme C11 2021 in its back panel design.

== Specifications ==
=== Design ===
The screen is made of Corning Gorilla Glass 3 and the body is made of plastic and features a special texture.

The microUSB port, microphone, and 3.5 mm audio jack are located at the bottom. On the left side of the smartphone, there is a slot for two SIM cards and a microSD memory card up to 256 GB. On the right side are the volume control buttons and the power button. The main camera unit with an LED flash and the main speaker are located on the back. All smartphones are equipped with a 6.5" IPS LCD HD+ (1600 × 720) with a 20:9 aspect ratio, 270 ppi pixel density, and a waterdrop notch for the front camera.

The color options may differ from the variant:

- The realme C20 and C11 2021 are sold in Cool Gray and Cool Blue colors.
- The realme narzo 50i is sold in Carbon Black and Mint Green colors.

=== Hardware ===
The realme C20 features a MediaTek Helio G35 processor and a PowerVR GE8320 GPU. The realme C11 2021 and narzo 50i feature a Unisoc SC9863A processor and an IMG8322 GPU.

The battery has a capacity of 5000 mAh. Reverse wired charging is also supported for all phones.

The smartphones feature an 8 MP main camera, f/2.0 (wide-angle) with autofocus and 1080p@30fps video recording capability. The front camera has a 5 MP resolution, f/2.2 aperture (wide-angle), and 1080p@30fps video recording capability. The realme C20 and C11 2021 are sold in a 2/32 GB configuration.

=== Software ===
The realme C20 was released with realme UI 1 based on Android 10.

The realme C11 2021 and narzo 50i were released with realme UI Go Edition based on Android 11.
