= Realme C31 =

realme C31
- Brand: realme
- Type: Phablet
- Series: C
- First released: March 25, 2022; 4 years ago
- Availability by region: March 31, 2022
- Predecessor: Realme C21
- Successor: Realme C51
- Related: Realme C30; Realme C35
- Compatible networks: GSM, 3G, 4G (LTE)
- Form factor: Slab
- Dimensions: 164.7×76.1×8.4 mm (6.48×3.00×0.33 in)
- Weight: 197 g (7 oz)
- Operating system: Initial: Android 11 + realme UI R Edition; Current: Android 13 + realme UI T Edition
- System-on-chip: UNISOC T612 (12 nm)
- CPU: Octa-core (2×1.8 GHz Cortex-A75 & 6×1.8 GHz Cortex-A53)
- GPU: Mali-G57
- Memory: 3/4 GB LPDDR4X
- Storage: 32/64 GB UFS 2.2
- Removable storage: MicroSDXC up to 256 GB
- Battery: Non-removable, Li-Po 5000 mAh
- Charging: 10 W
- Rear camera: 13 MP, f/2.2, 26 mm (wide-angle), 1/3.06", 1.12 μm, AF + 2 MP, f/2.4 (macro) + 0.3 MP, f/2.8 (B/W); LED flash, HDR, panorama Video: 1080p@30fps
- Front camera: 5 MP, f/2.2, 27 mm (wide-angle), 1/5", 1.12 μm HDR; Video: 720p@30fps
- Display: IPS LCD, 6.5", 1600 × 720 (HD+), 20:9, 270 ppi
- Connectivity: microUSB 2.0, 3.5 mm Audio, Bluetooth 5.0 (A2DP, LE), Wi-Fi 802.11 b/g/n, GPS (A-GPS), GLONASS, Galileo, BeiDou
- Data inputs: Touch screen multi-touch, microphone, fingerprint sensor (side-mounted), accelerometer, proximity sensor, compass
- Website: www.realme.com/eu/realme-c31

The Realme C31 is an entry-level smartphone developed by Realme. It was introduced on March 25, 2022 and released on March 31, 2022.

The screen is equipped with Panda Glass and the body is made of plastic and features a special texture. In terms of design, the realme C31 is similar to most realme smartphones from 2022.

The realme C31 was sold in Dark-Green and Light-Silver colors.

== Specifications ==
=== Hardware ===
The realme C31 received an entry-level system-on-a-chip, the UNISOC T612, which differs from the UNISOC T610 installed in the realme C21Y by having a more powerful Mali-G57 GPU instead of the Mali-G52 MP2. The realme C31 was available in 3/32 and 4/64 GB configurations.

The battery has a capacity of 5000 mAh.

The realme C31 received a triple main camera consisting of a wide-angle lens with 13 MP, an aperture of f/2.2, and autofocus, with the ability to record video in 1080p@30fps resolution, a 2 MP macro lens with an aperture of f/2.4, and a 0.3 MP black-and-white lens with an aperture of f/2.8. The smartphone also received a 5 MP wide-angle front camera with an aperture of f/2.2 and the ability to record video in 720p@30fps resolution.

The device features a 6.5-inch display of the IPS LCD type with HD+ resolution (1600 × 720), a 20:9 aspect ratio, a pixel density of 270 ppi, and a waterdrop notch for the front camera.

=== Software ===
The device was released with realme UI R Edition based on Android 11 and was later updated to realme UI T Edition based on Android 13.

== Critics ==
A reviewer form Tech Advisor that the camera's quality is poor and produces shaky and blurry photos.

== See also ==
- Realme C35
- Redmi Note 9
- Nokia C31
