= Realme 7 Pro =

Smartphone by Chinese brand

- Brand: realme
- Series: 7
- Predecessor: Realme 6 Pro
- Successor: Realme 8 Pro
- Related: Realme 7 Realme 7 5G; Realme 7i
- Compatible networks: 2G, 3G, 4G, 4G LTE
- Form factor: Slate
- Colors: Mirror Blue, Mirror Silver
- Dimensions: 160.9 mm × 74.3 mm × 8.7 mm (6.33 in × 2.93 in × 0.34 in)
- Weight: 182 g (6.4 oz)
- CPU: Qualcomm® Snapdragon™ 720 Gaming Mobile Platform CPU: 8nm, Octa-core, Up to 2.3GHz GPU: Adreno 618 AIE：5th Generation Qualcomm AI Engine
- Battery: Li-Po 4500 mAh, non-removable
- Charging: 65 W
- Rear camera: 64 MP, f/1.8, 26mm (wide), 1/2.0", Dual Pixel PDAF + 8 MP, f/2.3, 16mm (ultrawide) + 2 MP, f/2.4, (macro) + 2 MP, f/2.4, (depth|B/W) 4k 30fps, 1080p@60/30fps
- Front camera: 32 MP, f/2.5, 26mm (wide), 1/2.8", 1.0 μm, Panorama, 1080p@30/120fps, slow mo, smart-beauty, B/W
- Display: 2400×1080 (FullHD+); Super Amoled capacitive touchscreen, Gorilla Glass 3, 60 Hz refresh rate, 6.5 in (165 mm), 409 ppi
- Connectivity: Bluetooth 5.0; Wi-Fi a/b/g/n/ac 3G/LTE
- Data inputs: Sensors: Accelerometer; Fingerprint scanner; Magnetometer; Gyroscope; Proximity sensor; RGB Light Sensor; Other: Physical sound volume keys; USB-C
- Water resistance: Yes (splash resistant)
- Website: www.realme.com/in/realme-7-pro

Realme 7 Pro (stylized as realme 7 Pro) is a dual-SIM smartphone from the Chinese company Realme. It was launched on 10 September 2020. The devices has Gorilla Glass 3 shatter resistant glass with splash resistant back.
