= Realme 5 =

Chinese smartphone

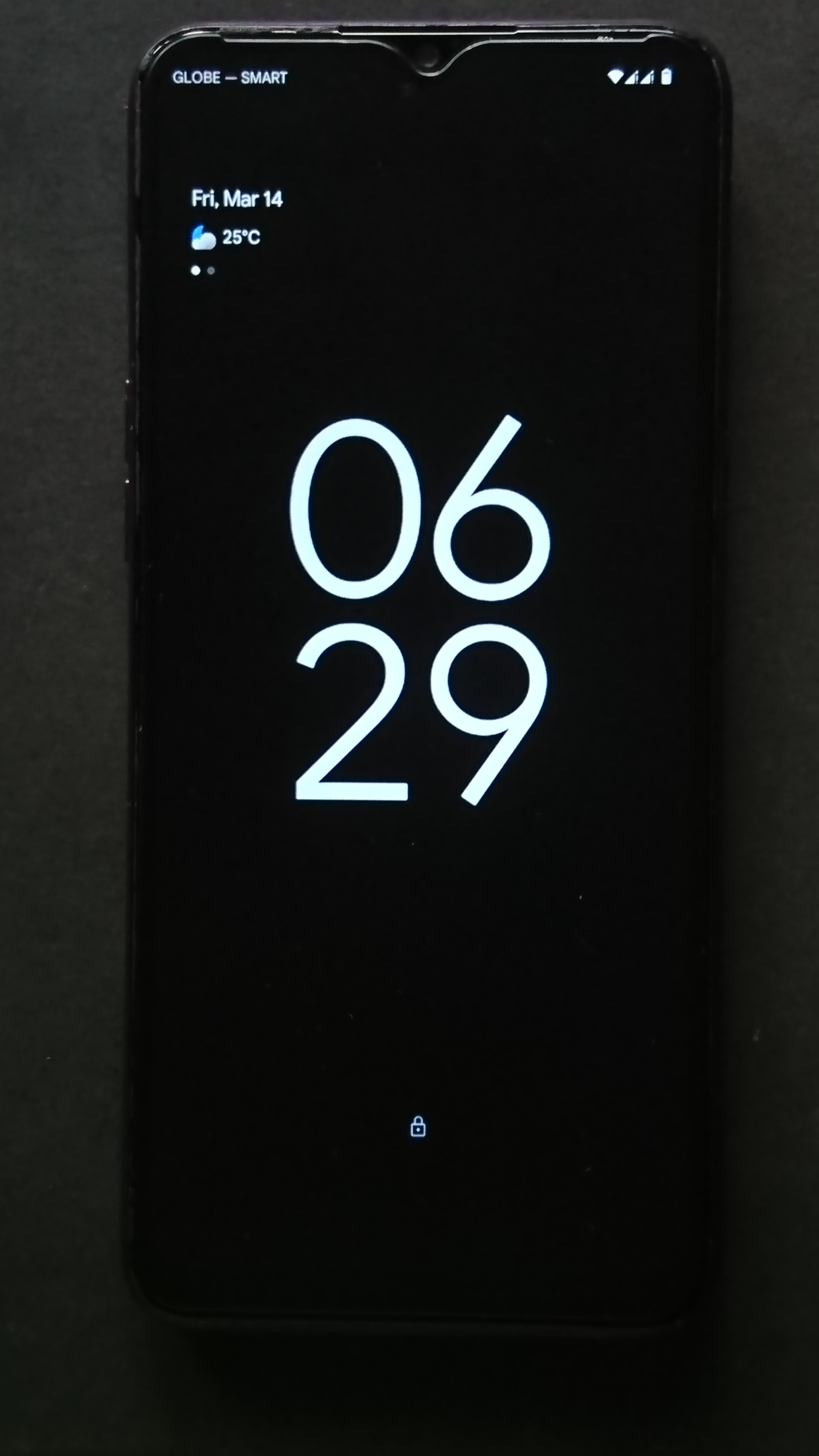
- A picture of the Realme 5, in its locked state.
- Also known as: trinket (on fastboot)
- Brand: realme
- Type: Smartphone
- First released: August 20, 2019; 6 years ago
- Compatible networks: GSM, HSPA, LTE
- Form factor: Slate
- Dimensions: H: 164.4 mm (6.47 in); W: 75.6 mm (2.98 in); D: 9.3 mm (0.37 in)
- Weight: 198 g (7.0 oz)
- Operating system: Original: ColorOS 6.0 (based on Android Pie); Current: realme UI 1.0, based on Android 10; Unofficial: Android 11 up to Android 15, multiple custom ROM distributions are available
- System-on-chip: Qualcomm Snapdragon 665 AIE
- CPU: Octa-core (4x2.0 GHz Kryo 260 Gold & 4x1.8 GHz Kryo 260 Silver)
- GPU: Adreno 610
- Storage: 3GB + 32GB or 3GB + 64GB or 4GB + 64GB or 4GB + 128GB
- Removable storage: Up to 256 GB external storage
- Battery: 5,000 mAh Li-Po
- Rear camera: Primary: Sony IMX 386; 12 MP (5P lens), f/1.8, 28mm, 1/2.86", 1.25µm, PDAF; Ultrawide: Hynix Hi-846; 8 MP, f/2.25, 13mm, 119˚, 1/4.0", 1.12µm; Macro: OmniVision OV02A1B; 2 MP, f/2.4, 1/5.0", 1.75µm; Depth: (Portrait camera) GalaxyCore GC2375; 2 MP, f/2.4, 1/5.0", 1.75µm; LED flash, HDR, panorama; 4K@30fps, 1080p@30fps, gyro-EIS
- Front camera: Samsung ISOCELL S5K3L6; 13 MP, f/2.0, 26mm (wide), 1/3.1", 1.12µm; HDR, panorama; 1080p@30fps
- Display: 6.5 in (170 mm) (720 ×1600 pixels or 720p) IPS LCD multi-Touch display
- Sound: 3.5mm jack loudspeaker
- Connectivity: All models: WLAN: Wi-Fi 802.11 a/b/g/n/ac, dual-band, Wi-Fi Direct, hotspot; Bluetooth: 5.0, A2DP, LE; GPS: A-GPS, GLONASS, GALILEO, BDS; Radio: FM radio; USB: microUSB 2.0, USB On-The-Go
- Website: www.realme.com/in/realme-5

The Realme 5 is a smartphone from the Indian/Chinese company Realme released in 2019. It is a successor to the Realme 3, which was released the same year.

== Specifications ==
=== Hardware ===
The Realme 5 uses the 64-bit Qualcomm Snapdragon 665 AIE SoC with an octa core processor capable of running at 2.0 GHz max and the Adreno 610 GPU. It is powered by a 5000 mAh high-capacity battery. The front features a 6.5-inch HD+ (720x1600) display with Gorilla Glass 3 protection. The device has three models available: 3 GB RAM/32 GB storage, 4 GB RAM/64 GB storage or 4 GB RAM/128 GB storage. It supports memory expansion up to 256 GB via the microSD card slot.

==== Camera ====
Realme 5 has a quad camera setup that includes a 12-megapixel primary sensor with f/1.8 aperture. The second camera is an 8-megapixel ultra-wide sensor, whereas the third and fourth cameras are 2-megapixel sensors for depth and macro mode. The front camera is a 13-megapixel sensor and it has an AI beauty mode. The cameras are AI-enabled with scene detection to capture better photos.

=== Software ===
The Realme 5 is equipped with ColorOS 6.0.1 based on Android 9.0 (Pie) operating system, and is upgradeable to realme UI 1.0 based on Android 10, and has a customized spatial design and close-to-native interaction mode exclusive to Realme. Realme has developed the Dirac Power Sound small speaker sound quality optimization technology jointly with Dirac Research AB to enhance the audio.

== Realme 5i ==
The Realme 5i, an upgraded version, was released in January 2020. It is similar to the base mode Realme 5, but has an 8 MP camera at the front and a different back design. The price of the base model of Realme 5i is the same as the base model of the Realme 5, starting at ₹11,999. The Realme 5i has 64 GB internal storage with 3 GB RAM. The 5 and 5i are both upgradeable to Android 10.
