= Realme C11 =

2020 smartphone by Realme

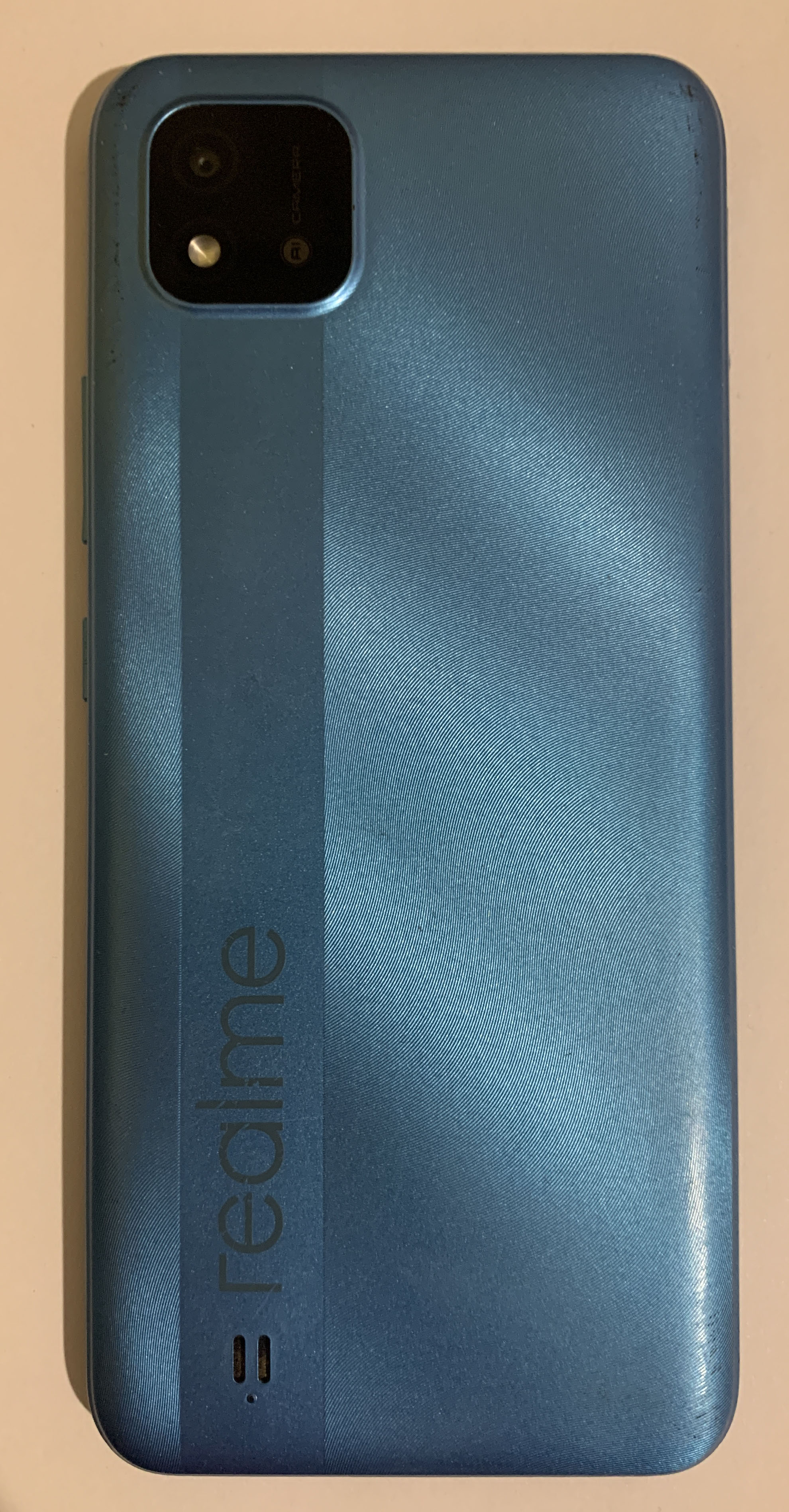
- Brand: Realme
- Manufacturer: Realme
- Type: Smartphone
- First released: July 7, 2020
- Form factor: Slate
- Colors: Mint Green, Pepper Grey
- Dimensions: 164.4×75.9×9.1 mm (6.47×2.99×0.36 in)
- Weight: 196 g (7 oz)
- Operating system: Android 10, Realme UI
- System-on-chip: MediaTek MT6765G Helio G35 (12 nm)
- CPU: Octa-core (4×2.3 GHz Cortex-A53 & 4×1.8 GHz Cortex-A53)
- GPU: PowerVR GE8320
- Memory: 2 GB or 3 GB RAM
- Storage: 32 GB eMMC 5.1
- Removable storage: microSDXC (dedicated slot)
- SIM: Nano-SIM + Nano-SIM
- Battery: 5000 mAh
- Charging: 10W wired
- Rear camera: 13 MP (wide), 2 MP (depth)
- Front camera: 5 MP (wide)
- Display: 6.5-inch IPS LCD, 720 × 1560 pixels
- Website: https://www.realme.com/

The Realme C11 is an entry-level smartphone developed by Realme, released in July 2020. It features a 6.5-inch IPS LCD and is powered by the MediaTek Helio G35 chipset paired with up to 3 GB of RAM. The device includes a dual rear camera system with a 13-megapixel primary sensor and a 5-megapixel front-facing camera. It runs on Android 10 with Realme UI.

The device was positioned in the budget segment, with a price below €100 at launch. Reviewers noted its long battery life due to the 5000 mAh battery, though charging speeds were limited to 10 W. The device was also criticized for its low performance, even for the price range, and low sound quality.

According to Gadgets Now, the phone features a polycarbonate body design and does not include a fingerprint sensor. The back is textured with many parallel ridges, each 0.1 mm apart, to prevent fingerprint marks.

The storage can be expanded using a microSD card via a dedicated slot.
