= Realme 7 =

2020 smartphone by Chinese company Realme

Realme 7 and Realme 7 Pro

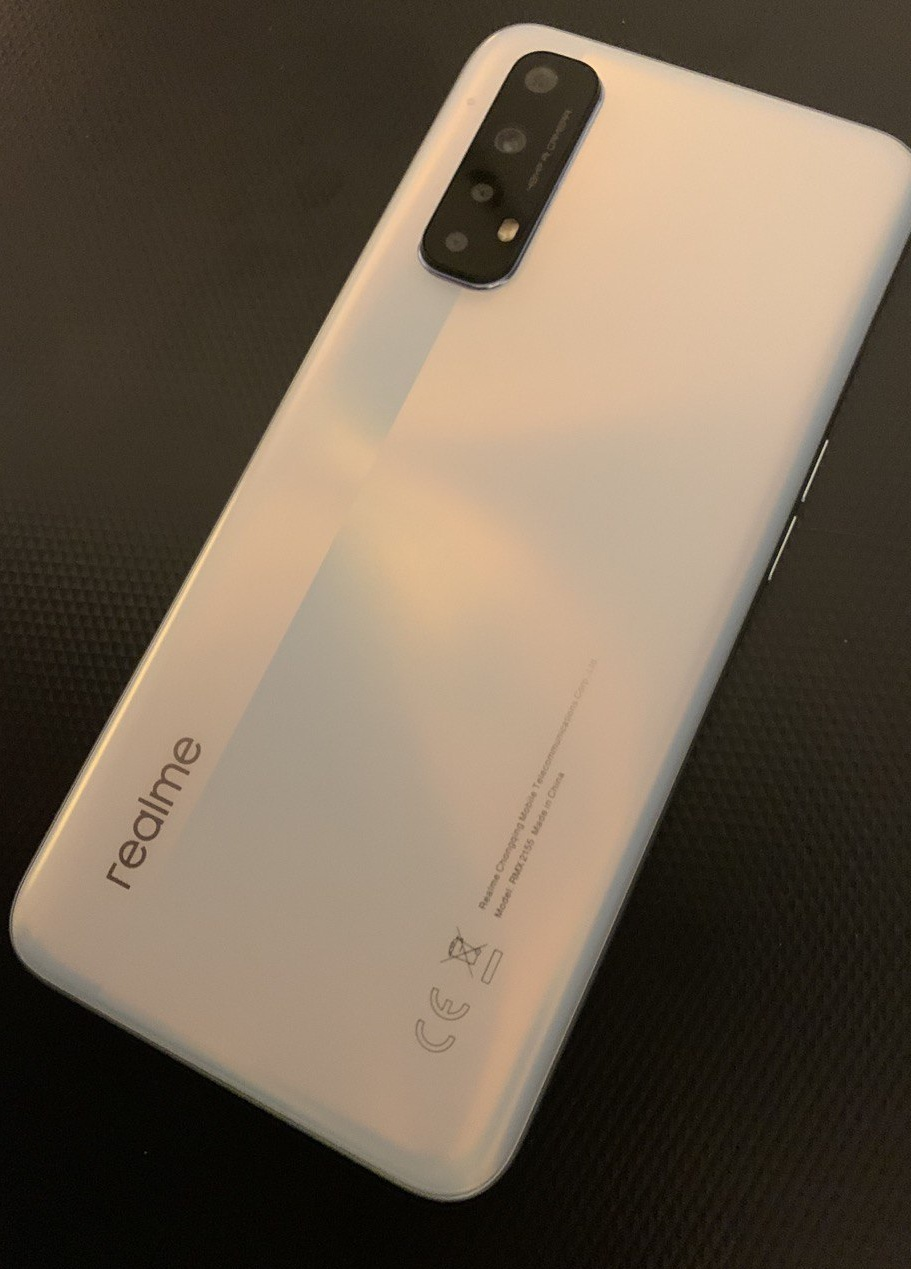
- Brand: realme
- Series: 7
- Predecessor: Realme 6
- Successor: Realme 8
- Compatible networks: 2G, 3G, 4G, 4G LTE
- Form factor: Slate
- Colors: Mist Blue, Mist White
- Dimensions: 162.3 mm × 75.4 mm × 9.4 mm (6.39 in × 2.97 in × 0.37 in)
- Weight: 196.5 g (6.93 oz)
- Operating system: Android 10 (11,12)
- CPU: Mediatek Helio G95 Octa-core (2x2.05 GHz Cortex-A76 & 6x2.0 GHz Cortex-A55)
- Battery: Li-Po 5000 mAh, non-removable
- Charging: 30 W
- Rear camera: 64 MP, f/1.8, 26mm (wide), 1/2.0", Dual Pixel PDAF + 8 MP, f/2.3, 16mm (ultrawide) + 2 MP, f/2.4, (macro) + 2 MP, f/2.4, (depth) 4k 30fps, 1080p@60/30fps
- Front camera: 16 MP, f/2.1, 26mm (wide), 1/3.1", 1.0 μm, Panorama, 1080p@30/120fps
- Display: 2400×1080 (1080p) IPS LCD capacitive touchscreen, Gorilla Glass 3, 90 Hz refresh rate, 6.5 in (165 mm), 405 ppi
- Connectivity: Bluetooth 5.0; Wi-Fi a/b/g/n/ac 3G/LTE
- Data inputs: Sensors: Accelerometer; Fingerprint scanner; Magnetometer; Gyroscope; Proximity sensor; RGB Light Sensor; Other: Physical sound volume keys; USB-C
- Water resistance: Yes
- Website: www.realme.com/in/realme-7, www.realme.com/in/realme-7-pro

Realme 7 and Realme 7 Pro are dual-SIM smartphones from the Chinese company Realme. They were launched on 10 September 2020. Both of the devices have Gorilla Glass 3 shatter resistant glass.

== Specifications ==
=== Hardware ===
Realme 7 is powered by Mediatek Helio G95 SoC 4G chip that has a octa-core (2x2.05 GHz Cortex-A76 & 6x2.0 GHz Cortex-A55) (12 nm) CPU and the Mali-G76 MC4 GPU. It has a 5000 mAh non-removable battery. It supports 30 W Dart Charge quick charging. It has three models: 6 GB RAM/64 GB storage and 8 GB RAM/128 GB storage. However, the Asian model of the Realme 7 doesn't have the 4 GB RAM/64 GB storage model. It supports memory expansion up to 256 GB via microSD card slot. It supports a 6.5-inch FHD+ IPS LCD panel with 1080x2400 resolution, 90 Hz refresh rate and 90.5% screen-to-body ratio.

Realme 7 Pro is powered by Qualcomm Snapdragon 720G SoC that has an octa-core (2x2.3 GHz Kryo 465 Gold & 6x1.8 GHz Kryo 465 Silver) CPU and the Adreno 618 GPU. It has a 4500 mAh non-removable battery. It supports 65 W Super Dart Charge quick charging. The device is available with 6 GB or 8 GB RAM and 128 GB of storage, it supports memory expansion up to 256 GB via microSD card slot. It sports a 6.4-inch FHD+ Super AMOLED display with 1080x2400 resolution, 60 Hz refresh rate and 90.8% screen-to-body ratio.

==== Camera ====
Both Realme 7 and Realme 7 Pro are equipped with a quad-camera setup consisting of a 64-megapixel Sony IMX682 main camera with light-sensing ability, 1/1.73" large sensor size, 0.8 qm pixel size, f/1.8 aperture, 26 mm focal length, PDAF and Quad Bayer support; an 8-megapixel wide-angle camera with a 119-degree field of view, 1/4.0" sensor size, 1.12 qm pixel size, f/2.3 aperture and 16 mm focal length; a 2-megapixel macro camera with f/2,4 aperture, and a 2-megapixel depth camera. However, in the global model of Realme 7, there is a 48 MP main camera with 1/2.0" sensor size, 0.8 qm pixel size, f/1.8 aperture, 26 mm focal length, PDAF and Quad Bayer support.

=== Software ===
Realme 7 and Realme 7 Pro both run on Realme UI based on Android 10.
