= Realme =

Chinese consumer electronics manufacturer, a subsidiary of Oppo

realme Chongqing Mobile Telecommunications Co., Ltd.
- Trade name: realme
- Native name: 真我
- Romanized name: Zhēn wǒ
- Type: Subsidiary
- Industry: Consumer electronics
- Founded: 4 May 2018; 8 years ago
- Founder: Sky Li
- Headquarters: Shenzhen, Guangdong, China
- Area served: Worldwide
- Key people: Sky Li (李炳忠) (Founder and Global CEO); Xu Qi (徐起) (CMO); Yao Kun (姚坤) (CTO); Wang Wei (王伟) (CPO)
- Products: Smart phones Tablet computers Earphones; Powerbanks; Phone cases Bags; Smart TVs; Smart Watch; Laptop
- Number of employees: 4,100 (consolidated, as of 2025)
- Parent: Oppo
- Divisions: realme Techlife realme Dizo
- Website: realme.com

realme is a multinational Chinese consumer electronics manufacturer backed by Oppo based in Shenzhen, Guangdong. In 2021, realme was the sixth‑largest smartphone vendor worldwide in terms of shipments in the overall global smartphone market. In 2026, it was reintegrated into Oppo as a sub-brand.

== History ==
=== 2018–2020 ===
realme company was founded on May 4, 2018. Previously, it was a sub-brand of Oppo, which is itself a subsidiary of BBK Electronics, until its formation as a spinoff on May 4, 2018. In May 2018, they released their first phone, realme 1.

On July 30, 2018, Sky Li announced his resignation from Oppo, and his intention to establish realme as an independent brand, on Sina Weibo. On August 28, 2018, realme was officially established as an independent entity, and the realme 2 was released in India.

In August 2019, realme had surpassed 10 million users globally.

In November 2019, realme was reported as one of the top five smartphone brands in India and the fastest-growing smartphone brand in Spain.

In October 2020, realme was reported as the world's fastest smartphone brand to reach 50 million cumulative sales.

=== 2021–2025 ===
In February 2021, the company ranked among the top five smartphone brands in 14 global markets, according to Canalys.

In August 2021, realme became the fastest smartphone brand to reach 100 million cumulative shipments globally.

In December 2021, it ranked among the top five in 21 markets worldwide and was reported to be the fastest-growing 5G smartphone brand. At the time, it became the second largest smartphone brand, just behind Samsung.

In February 2022, realme made its debut at Mobile World Congress (MWC), where it introduced the GT 2 series, its entry into the high-end smartphone segment.

In May 2023, realme released the realme 11 series, highlighting improvements in imaging technology, including higher-resolution sensors, larger lenses, and multiple focal lengths.

In November 2023, realme reported that its cumulative global smartphone shipments had exceeded 200 million units, maintaining a position among the top ten global smartphone brands for five consecutive years, according to Counterpoint Research.

In June 2024, realme released the GT 6 smartphone globally.

In November 2024, realme released the GT 7 Pro, powered by the Snapdragon 8 Elite chipset.

In 2025, realme unveiled concept smartphones featuring battery capacities of up to 10,000mAh and 15,000mAh, as part of its exploration of extended battery technologies.

The company introduced in August 2025 that it had reached over 300 million global users.

=== 2026–present ===
On 7 January 2026, realme announced that it would be integrated into Oppo as a sub-brand.

In July 2026, realme announced that it would stop launching new products in China and focus its resources on overseas markets. Oppo would handle continued sales and warranty support for existing realme devices in China, while Realme UI would be replaced by ColorOS on supported devices.

== See also ==
- List of Realme products
