= ARM Cortex-A =

Family of microprocessor cores with ARM microarchitecture

General information
- Designed by: ARM Holdings

Architecture and classification
- Instruction set: ARM, Thumb-2 (32-bit cores); ARMv7-A and ARMv8-A; A64, A32, T32 (64-bit cores); ARMv8-A, ARMv8.1-A, ARMv8.2-A, ARMv9-A, ARMv9.2-A

The ARM Cortex-A is a family of ARM architecture processor cores developed by Arm Holdings. Designed for application-level computing, Cortex-A cores are widely used in devices such as smartphones, tablets, laptops, and embedded systems.

Cortex-A processors include both 32-bit and 64-bit designs. Most 32-bit cores implement the ARMv7-A architecture profile. All 64-bit Cortex-A cores implement the ARMv8-A profile, which supports both 64-bit and, in some cases, 32-bit execution.

The Cortex-A series is distinct from Arm's Cortex-R and Cortex-M families, which are optimized for real-time and low-power applications, respectively. Unlike the other two families, the Cortex-A series supports a memory management unit (MMU) required by many modern operating systems.

In 2025, Arm introduced the C-series naming scheme to succeed the Cortex-A and Cortex-X branding for application processors. The C-series cores continue the architectural lineage of the Cortex-A family, beginning with the C1 generation.

== Overview ==
64-bit
Year	Core
2016	Cortex-A34
2018	Cortex-A65
2021	Cortex-A510
2022	Cortex-A715
2023	Cortex-A520
2023	Cortex-A720
2024	Cortex-A725

32/64-bit
Year	Core
2012	Cortex-A53
2012	Cortex-A57
2015	Cortex-A35
2015	Cortex-A72
2016	Cortex-A73
2017	Cortex-A55
2017	Cortex-A75
2018	Cortex-A76
2019	Cortex-A77
2020	Cortex-A78
2021	Cortex-A710
2022	Cortex-A510 (refresh)

32-bit
Year	Core
2005	Cortex-A8
2007	Cortex-A9
2009	Cortex-A5
2010	Cortex-A15
2011	Cortex-A7
2013	Cortex-A12
2014	Cortex-A17
2016	Cortex-A32

=== Licensing and customization ===
Arm Holdings does not produce or sell physical processors. Instead, it licenses its processor designs to other companies, which integrate them into custom chips. Licensees receive a synthesizable hardware description of the core—typically written in Verilog—along with a software development toolkit and the rights to produce and sell chips containing the ARM architecture.

This licensing model allows chip designers to customize the processor core to meet specific performance, power efficiency, or size requirements. Manufacturers can add proprietary features, optimize for higher clock speeds or lower power consumption, and configure the core to suit a wide range of applications. The exact configuration of an ARM-based chip varies by manufacturer and can be determined by consulting datasheets and reference manuals.

=== Instruction sets ===
Cortex-A cores implement several versions of the ARM architecture, reflecting their generation and feature set. Older models such as the Cortex-A5, A7, A8, A9, A12, A15, and A17 are based on the ARMv7-A architecture. Newer 32-bit and 64-bit cores—including the Cortex-A32, A34, A35, A53, A57, A72, and A73—use the ARMv8-A architecture, which introduced support for exclusive load and store instructions used in synchronization. Later cores such as the Cortex-A55, A65, A75, A76, A77, and A78 implement ARMv8.2-A. The most recent designs, including the Cortex-A510, A710, A715, A520, and A720, are based on the ARMv9-A and ARMv9.2-A architectures.

=== Technical documentation ===
Documentation for ARM-based processors is typically organized in several layers. At the top level are high-level marketing materials and datasheets provided by the chip manufacturer, which describe the specific system-on-chip (SoC) and its capabilities. More detailed reference manuals outline the chip’s peripherals and system integration features.

At the core level, Arm publishes reference manuals for each Cortex-A processor, covering implementation details and supported features. For a deeper understanding of the underlying instruction sets and architecture, Arm’s architecture reference manuals provide a comprehensive technical specification. Additional documentation, such as evaluation board guides, application notes, and errata, is often provided by manufacturers to support development and deployment.

== See also ==
- ARM architecture family
- ARM Cortex-M
- ARM Cortex-R
- Comparison of ARMv7-A cores
- Comparison of ARMv8-A cores
- JTAG, SWD
- List of ARM processors

ARM Core	Bit Width	ARM Website	ARM Technical Reference Manual	ARM Architecture Reference Manual
Cortex-A5	32	Link	Link	ARMv7-A
Cortex-A7	32	Link	Link	ARMv7-A
Cortex-A8	32	Link	Link	ARMv7-A
Cortex-A9	32	Link	Link	ARMv7-A
Cortex-A12	32	merged into A17		ARMv7-A
Cortex-A15	32	Link	Link	ARMv7-A
Cortex-A17	32	Link	Link	ARMv7-A
Cortex-A32	32	Link	Link	ARMv8-A
Cortex-A34	64	Link	Link	ARMv8-A
Cortex-A35	32/64	Link	Link	ARMv8-A
Cortex-A53	32/64	Link	Link	ARMv8-A
Cortex-A55	32/64	Link	Link	ARMv8.2-A
Cortex-A57	32/64	Link	Link	ARMv8-A
Cortex-A510	64 (2021); 32/64 (2022)	Link	Link	ARMv9-A
Cortex-A520	64	Link	Link	ARMv9.2-A
Cortex-A65	64	Link	Link	ARMv8.2-A
Cortex-A72	32/64	Link	Link	ARMv8-A
Cortex-A73	32/64	Link	Link	ARMv8-A
Cortex-A75	32/64	Link	Link	ARMv8.2-A
Cortex-A76	32/64	Link	Link	ARMv8.2-A
Cortex-A77	32/64	Link	Link	ARMv8.2-A
Cortex-A78	32/64	Link	Link	ARMv8.2-A
Cortex-A710	32/64	Link	Link	ARMv9-A
Cortex-A715	64	Link	Link	ARMv9-A
Cortex-A720	64	Link	Link	ARMv9.2-A
