= Realme GT Series =

Series of smartphones and tablet computers

- Developer: Realme
- Type: Smartphones
- Released: March 2021; 5 years ago
- System on a chip: Qualcomm Snapdragon; Mediatek

The Realme GT series is a line of high-end gaming-focused Android smartphones produced by Realme, and is the successor to Realme X series. The series starts with the announcement of the Realme GT 5G in February 2021, which was released in March 2021. It was codenamed realme Ace before the announcement. It is equipped with a flagship Qualcomm Snapdragon 888 processor and include GT Mode which claims to increase the performance of the phone for smoother gaming experience. The GT lineup released to date includes a GT mode.

== Realme GT series ==
Model name	Model number	Release date	Display type	Display size	Display resolution	SoC (Core/Freq)	GPU	RAM	Internal Storage	Camera		Battery	Charging	Operating system	
Model name	Model number	Release date	Display type	Display size	Display resolution	SoC (Core/Freq)	GPU	RAM	Internal Storage	Rear	Front	Battery	Charging	Initial	Latest
Realme GT	RMX2202	March 2021	Super AMOLED, 120 Hz	6.43"	1080 x 2400 (~409 ppi)	Qualcomm Snapdragon; 888 1x 2.84 GHz Cortex-X1 + 3x 2.42 GHz Cortex-A78 + 4x 1.80 GHz Cortex-A55	Adreno 660 @840 MHz	8 GB; 12 GB (LPDDR5)	128 GB; 256 GB (UFS 3.1)	64 MP, f/1.8 + 8 MP, f/2.3 (ultrawide) + 2 MP, f/2.4 (macro)	16 MP, f/2.5	4500 mAh (Li-Po)	USB-C, 65 W	Android 11	Android 14
Realme GT2	RMX3310; RMX3311; RMX3312	January 2022	E4 Super AMOLED, 120 Hz Corning Gorilla Glass 5	6.62"	1080 x 2400 (~398 ppi)	Qualcomm Snapdragon; 888 1x 2.84 GHz Cortex-X1 + 3x 2.42 GHz Cortex-A78 + 4x 1.80 GHz Cortex-A55	Adreno 660 @840 MHz	8 GB; 12 GB (LPDDR5)	128 GB; 256 GB (UFS 3.1)	50 MP OIS, f/1.8 + 8 MP, f/2.2 (ultrawide) + 2 MP, f/2.4 (macro)	16 MP, f/2.5	5000 mAh (Li-Po)	USB-C, 65 W	Android 12	Android 15
Realme GT2 Pro	RMX3300; RMX3301	January 2022	E4 LTPO 2.0 AMOLED, 120 Hz Corning Gorilla Glass Victus	6.7"	1440 x 3216 (~526 ppi)	Qualcomm Snapdragon; 8 Gen 1 1x 3.0 GHz Cortex-X2 + 3x 2.5 GHz Cortex-A710 + 4x 1.8 GHz Cortex-A510	Adreno 730 @818 MHz	8 GB; 12 GB (LPDDR5)	128 GB; 256 GB; 512 GB (UFS 3.1)	50 MP OIS, f/1.8 + 50 MP, f/2.2 (ultrawide) + 2 MP, f/3.3 (microscope)	32 MP, f/2.4	5000 mAh (Li-Po)	USB-C, 65 W	Android 12	Android 15
Realme GT3	RMX3709	February 2023	AMOLED, 1B colors, 144 Hz, HDR10+	6.78"	1240 x 2772 (~451 ppi)	Qualcomm Snapdragon; 8+ Gen 1 1x 3.0 GHz Cortex-X2 + 3x 2.5 GHz Cortex-A710 + 4x 1.8 GHz Cortex-A510	Adreno 730 @818 MHz	8 GB; 12 GB; 16 GB (LPDDR5X)	128 GB; 256 GB; 512 GB; 1 TB (UFS 3.1)	50 MP OIS, f/1.9 + 8 MP, f/2.2 (ultrawide) + 2 MP, f/3.3 (microscope)	16 MP, f/2.5	4600 mAh (Li-Po)	USB-C, 240 W	Android 13	Android 14
Realme GT5	RMX3823	August 2023	AMOLED, 1B colors, 144 Hz, HDR10+	6.74"	1240 x 2772 (~451 ppi)	Qualcomm Snapdragon; 8 Gen 2 1x 3.2 GHz Cortex-X3 + 2x 2.8 GHz Cortex-A715 + 2x 2.28 GHz Cortex-A715 + 3x 2.8 GHz Cortex-A510	Adreno 740	12 GB; 16 GB (LPDDR5X)	256 GB; 512 GB (UFS 4.0)	50 MP OIS, f/1.9 + 8 MP, f/2.2 (ultrawide) + 2 MP, f/2.4 (microscope)	16 MP, f/2.5	5240mAh (Li-Po)	USB-C, 150 W	Android 13	Android 16
Realme GT5 240W	RMX3823	August 2023	AMOLED, 1B colors, 144 Hz, HDR10+	6.74"	1240 x 2772 (~451 ppi)	Qualcomm Snapdragon; 8 Gen 2 1x 3.2 GHz Cortex-X3 + 2x 2.8 GHz Cortex-A715 + 2x 2.28 GHz Cortex-A715 + 3x 2.8 GHz Cortex-A510	Adreno 740	24 GB (LPDDR5X)	1 TB (UFS 4.0)	50 MP OIS, f/1.9 + 8 MP, f/2.2 (ultrawide) + 2 MP, f/2.4 (microscope)	16 MP, f/2.5	4600mAh (Li-Po)	USB-C, 240 W	Android 13	Android 16
Realme GT5 Pro	RMX3888	July 2023	LTPO AMOLED, 1B colors, 144 Hz, HDR10+, Dolby Vision	6.78"	1264 x 2780 (~450 ppi)	Qualcomm Snapdragon; 8 Gen 3 (SM8650-AB) (Octa-core) 1x 3.3 GHz Cortex-X4 + 3x 3.2 GHz Cortex-A720 + 2x 3.0 GHz Cortex-A720 + 2x 2.3 GHz Cortex-A520	Adreno 750	12 GB; 16 GB (LPDDR5X)	256 GB; 512 GB; 1 TB (UFS 4.0)	50 MP OIS, f/1.7 + 50 MP, f/2.6 (periscope telephoto) +8 MP, f/2.2 (ultrawide)	32 MP, f/2.5	5400mAh (Li-Po)	USB-C 3.2, 100 W	Android 14	Android 16
Realme GT6	RMX3853	June 2024	LTPO 2.0 AMOLED, 1B colors, 120 Hz, HDR10+, Dolby Vision, Corning Gorilla Glass Victus 2	6.78"	1264 x 2780 (~450 ppi)	Qualcomm Snapdragon; 8s Gen 3 (SM8635) (Octa-core) 1x 3.0 GHz Cortex-X4 + 4x 2.8 GHz Cortex-A720 + 3x 2.0 GHz Cortex-A520	Adreno 735	8 GB; 12 GB; 16 GB (LPDDR5X)	256 GB; 512 GB (UFS 4.0)	50 MP OIS, f/1.7 + 50 MP, f/2.0 (telephoto) + 8 MP, f/2.2 (ultrawide)	32 MP, f/2.5	5500mAh (Li-Po)	USB-C, 120 W	Android 14	Android 16
Realme GT7 Pro	RMX5010	November 2024	Eco² OLED Plus, LTPO AMOLED, 1B colors, 120 Hz, HDR10+, Dolby Vision	6.78"	1264 x 2780 (~450 ppi)	Qualcomm Snapdragon; 8 Elite (3 nm) (Octa-core) Oryon v2 2x 4.32 GHz (Phoenix L); Prime cores + 6x 3.53 GHz (Phoenix M); Performance cores	Adreno 830	12 GB; 16 GB (LPDDR5X)	256 GB; 512 GB; 1 TB (UFS 4.0)	50 MP OIS, f/1.8 + 50 MP, f/2.65 (periscope telephoto) +8 MP, f/2.2 (ultrawide)	16 MP, f/2.45	6500mAh (Li-Po)	USB-C, 120 W	Android 15	Android 16
Realme GT7	RMX5011	April 2025	Eco² OLED Plus, LTPO AMOLED, 1B colors, 144 Hz, HDR10+, Dolby Vision	6.8"	1280 x 2800 (~453 ppi, 19.5:9 ratio)	MediaTek Dimensity 9400+ (3 nm) (Octa-core) 1x 3.73 GHz Cortex-X925 + 3x 3.3 GHz Cortex-X4 + 4x 2.4 GHz Cortex-A720	Immortalis-G925 MC12	12 GB; 16 GB (LPDDR5X)	256 GB; 512 GB; 1 TB (UFS 4.0)	50 MP OIS, f/1.8 + 50 MP, f/2.65 (periscope telephoto) + 8 MP, f/2.2 (ultrawide)	16 MP, f/2.4	7200mAh (Si/C; Li-Po)	USB-C, 100 W	Android 15	Android 16
Realme GT8 Pro	RMX5210	October 2025	AMOLED, 1B colors, 144Hz, HDR10+, HDR Vivid, Dolby Vision	6.79"	1440 x 3136 (~453 ppi, 19.5:9 ratio)	Qualcomm Snapdragon 8 Elite Gen 5 (3nm) (Octa-core) (2x4.6 GHz Oryon V3 Phoenix L + 6x3.62 GHz Oryon V3 Phoenix M)	Adreno 840	12GB 16GB(LPDDR5X)	256GB 512GB 1TB (UFS 4.0)	50 MP OIS, f/1.8 + 200 MP, f/2.6 (periscope telephoto) +50 MP, f/2.0 (ultrawide)	32 MP, f/2.4	7000mAh (Si/C; Li-Po)	USB-C, 100W	Android 16	Android 16
Model name	Model number	Release date	Display type	Display size	Display resolution	SoC (Core/Freq)	GPU	RAM	Internal Storage	Rear	Front	Battery	Charging	Initial	Latest
Model name	Model number	Release date	Display type	Display size	Display resolution	SoC (Core/Freq)	GPU	RAM	Internal Storage	Camera		Battery	Charging	Operating system	

== Realme GT Neo series ==
Model name	Model number	Release date	Display type	Display size	Display resolution	SoC (Core/Freq)	GPU	RAM	Internal Storage	Camera		Battery	Charging	Operating system	
Model name	Model number	Release date	Display type	Display size	Display resolution	SoC (Core/Freq)	GPU	RAM	Internal Storage	Rear	Front	Battery	Charging	Initial	Latest
Realme GT Neo	RMX3031	March 2021	Super AMOLED, 120 Hz	6.43"	1080 x 2400 (~409 ppi)	MediaTek Dimensity; 1200 1x 3.0 GHz Cortex-A78 + 3x 2.6 GHz Cortex-A78 + 4x 2.0 GHz Cortex-A55	Mali-G77 MC9	6 GB; 8 GB; 12 GB (LPDDR5)	128 GB; 256 GB (UFS 3.1)	64 MP, f/1.8 + 8 MP, f/2.3 (ultrawide) + 2 MP, f/2.4 (macro)	16 MP, f/2.5	4500 mAh (Li-Po)	USB-C, 50 W	Android 11	Android 12
Realme GT Neo Flash	RMX3350	May 2021	Super AMOLED, 120 Hz	6.43"	1080 x 2400 (~409 ppi)	MediaTek Dimensity; 1200 1x 3.0 GHz Cortex-A78 + 3x 2.6 GHz Cortex-A78 + 4x 2.0 GHz Cortex-A55	Mali-G77 MC9	8 GB; 12 GB (LPDDR5)	256 GB (UFS 3.1)	64 MP, f/1.8 + 8 MP, f/2.3 (ultrawide) + 2 MP, f/2.4 (macro)	16 MP, f/2.5	4500 mAh (Li-Po)	USB-C, 65 W	Android 11	Android 12
Realme GT Neo 2	RMX3370	September 2021	Super AMOLED, 120 Hz, HDR10+, Corning Gorilla Glass 5	6.62"	1080 x 2400 (~409 ppi)	Qualcomm Snapdragon; 870 1x 3.20 GHz + 3x 2.42 GHz + 4x 1.80 GHz	Adreno 650 @670 MHz	8 GB; 12 GB (LPDDR5)	128 GB; 256 GB (UFS 3.1)	64 MP, f/1.8 + 8 MP, f/2.3 (ultrawide) + 2 MP, f/2.4 (macro)	16 MP, f/2.5	5000 mAh (Li-Po)	USB-C, 65 W	Android 11	Android 12
Realme GT Neo 2T	RMX3357	November 2021	Super AMOLED, 120 Hz	6.43"	1080 x 2400 (~409 ppi)	MediaTek Dimensity; 1200 AI 1x 3.0 GHz Cortex-A78 + 3x 2.6 GHz Cortex-A78 + 4x 2.0 GHz Cortex-A55	Mali-G77 MC9	8 GB; 12 GB (LPDDR5)	128 GB; 256 GB (UFS 3.1)	64 MP, f/1.8 + 8 MP, f/2.3 (ultrawide) + 2 MP, f/2.4 (macro)	16 MP, f/2.5	4500 mAh (Li-Po)	USB-C, 65 W	Android 11	Android 12
Realme GT Neo 3	RMX3560; RMX3561	March 2022	BOE / Tianma AMOLED, 120 Hz Corning; Gorilla Glass 5	6.43"	1080 x 2412 (~394 ppi)	MediaTek Dimensity; 8100 4x 2.85 GHz Cortex-A78 + 4x 2.0 GHz Cortex-A55	Mali-G610 MC6	128 GB; 256 GB; 512 GB	6 GB; 8 GB; 12 GB (LPDDR5)	50 MP OIS, f/1.88 + 8 MP, f/2.3 (ultrawide) + 2 MP, f/2.4 (macro)	16 MP, f/2.5	5000 mAh (Li-Po)	USB-C, 80 W	Android 11	Android 12
Realme GT Neo 3; 150 W	RMX3563	March 2022	BOE / Tianma AMOLED, 120 Hz Corning; Gorilla Glass 5	6.43"	1080 x 2412 (~394 ppi)	MediaTek Dimensity; 8100 4x 2.85 GHz Cortex-A78 + 4x 2.0 GHz Cortex-A55	Mali-G610 MC6	8 GB; 12 GB (LPDDR5)	256 GB 512 GB (UFS 3.1)	50 MP OIS, f/1.88 + 8 MP, f/2.3 (ultrawide) + 2 MP, f/2.4 (macro)	16 MP, f/2.5	4500 mAh (Li-Po)	USB-C, 150 W	Android 11	Android 12
Realme GT Neo 3T	RMX3371; RMX3372	June 2022	E4 Super AMOLED, 120 Hz Corning; Gorilla Glass 5	6.62"	1080 x 2412 (~398 ppi)	Qualcomm Snapdragon; 870 1x 3.20 GHz + 3x 2.42 GHz + 4x 1.80 GHz	Adreno 650 @670 MHz	6 GB 8 GB (LPDDR4X)	128 GB; 256 GB (UFS 3.1)	64 MP, f/1.8 + 8 MP, f/2.3 (ultrawide) + 2 MP, f/2.4 (macro)	16 MP, f/2.5	5000 mAh (Li-Po)	USB-C, 80 W	Android 11	Android 12
Realme GT Neo 5 (GT3 in Europe)	RMX3706	February 2023	Tianma T7+ OLED, 144 Hz	6.74"	1240 x 2772 (~451 ppi)	Qualcomm Snapdragon; 8+ Gen 1 1x 3.0 GHz Cortex-X2 + 3x 2.5 GHz Cortex-A710 + 4x 1.8 GHz Cortex-A510	Adreno 730 @900 MHz	8 GB; 12 GB 16 GB (LPDDR5X)	256 GB 512 GB 1 TB (UFS 3.1)	50 MP OIS, f/1.88 + 8 MP, f/2.2 (ultrawide) + 2 MP, f/3.3 (microscope)	16 MP, f/2.5	5000 mAh (Li-Po)	USB-C, 150 W	Android 13	Android 14
Realme GT Neo 5 240 W (GT3 240 W in Europe)	RMX3708	February 2023	Tianma T7+ OLED, 144 Hz	6.74"	1240 x 2772 (~451 ppi)	Qualcomm Snapdragon; 8+ Gen 1 1x 3.0 GHz Cortex-X2 + 3x 2.5 GHz Cortex-A710 + 4x 1.8 GHz Cortex-A510	Adreno 730 @900 MHz	16 GB (LPDDR5X)	256 GB 512 GB 1 TB (UFS 3.1)	50 MP OIS, f/1.88 + 8 MP, f/2.2 (ultrawide) + 2 MP, f/3.3 (microscope)	16 MP, f/2.5	4600 mAh (Li-Po)	USB-C, 240 W	Android 13	Android 14
Realme GT Neo 5 SE	RMX3700	April 2023	Tianma T7+ OLED, 144 Hz	6.74"	1240 x 2772 (~451 ppi)	Qualcomm Snapdragon; 7+ Gen 2 1x 2.91 GHz Cortex-X2 + 3x 2.5 GHz Cortex-A710 + 4x 1.8 GHz Cortex-A510	Adreno 725 @580 MHz	8 GB; 12 GB 16 GB (LPDDR5X)	256 GB 512 GB 1 TB (UFS 3.1)	64 MP, f/1.79 + 8 MP, f/2.2 (ultrawide) + 2 MP, f/3.3 (microscope)	16 MP, f/2.5	5500 mAh (Li-Po)	USB-C, 100 W	Android 13	Android 14
Realme GT Neo 6	RMX3852	May 2024	LTPO AMOLED, 120 Hz, 1B colors, HDR	6.78"	1264 x 2780 (~450 ppi)	Qualcomm Snapdragon; 8s Gen 3 (SM8635) 1x 3.0 GHz Cortex-X4 + 4x 2.8 GHz Cortex-A720 + 3x 2.0 GHz Cortex-A520	Adreno 735	12 GB; 16 GB (LPDDR5X)	256 GB; 512 GB; 1 TB (UFS 4.0)	50 MP, f/1.9 + 8 MP, f/2.2 (ultrawide)	32 MP, f/2.5	5500 mAh (Li-Po)	USB-C, 120 W	Android 14	Android 14
Realme GT Neo 6 SE	RMX3850	April 2024	LTPO AMOLED, 120 Hz, 1B colors, HDR	6.43"	1264 x 2780 (~450 ppi)	Qualcomm Snapdragon; 7+ Gen 3 1x 2.8 GHz Cortex-X4 + 4x 2.6 GHz Cortex-A720 + 3x 1.9 GHz Cortex-A520	Adreno 732	8 GB; 12 GB; 16 GB (LPDDR5X)	256 GB; 512 GB (UFS 4.0)	50 MP, f/1.9 + 8 MP, f/2.2 (ultrawide)	32 MP, f/2.5	5500 mAh (Li-Po)	USB-C, 100 W	Android 14	Android 14
Model name	Model number	Release date	Display type	Display size	Display resolution	SoC (Core/Freq)	GPU	RAM	Internal Storage	Rear	Front	Battery	Charging	Initial	Latest
Model name	Model number	Release date	Display type	Display size	Display resolution	SoC (Core/Freq)	GPU	RAM	Internal Storage	Camera		Battery	Charging	Operating system	

== Realme GT Master Editions ==
Model name	Model number	Release date	Display type	Display size	Display resolution	SoC (Core/Freq)	GPU	RAM	Internal Storage	Camera		Battery	Charging	Operating system	
Model name	Model number	Release date	Display type	Display size	Display resolution	SoC (Core/Freq)	GPU	RAM	Internal Storage	Rear	Front	Battery	Charging	Initial	Latest
Realme GT Master	RMX3360; RMX3361; RMX3363	July 2021	Super AMOLED, 120 Hz	6.43"	1080 x 2400 (~409 ppi)	Qualcomm Snapdragon; 778G 1x 2.4 GHz Cortex-A78 + 3x 2.2 GHz Cortex-A78 + 4x 1.9 GHz Cortex-A55	Adreno 642L @950 MHz	6 GB; 8 GB (LPDDR4X)	128 GB; 256 GB (UFS 2.2)	64 MP, f/1.8 + 8 MP, f/2.2 (ultrawide) + 2 MP, f/2.4 (macro)	32 MP, f/2.5	4300 mAh (Li-Po)	USB-C, 50 W	Android 11	Android 13
Realme GT Explorer Master	RMX3366	July 2021	Curved Super AMOLED, 120 Hz Corning; Gorilla Glass 5	6.55"	1080 x 2400 (~402 ppi)	Qualcomm Snapdragon; 870 1x 3.20 GHz + 3x 2.42 GHz + 4x 1.80 GHz	Adreno 650 @670 MHz	8 GB; 12 GB (LPDDR4X)	128 GB; 256 GB (UFS 3.1)	50 MP OIS, f/1.88 + 16 MP, f/2.2 (ultrawide) + 2 MP, f/2.4 (macro)	32 MP, f/2.5	4500 mAh (Li-Po)	USB-C, 65 W	Android 11	Android 13
Realme GT2 Explorer Master	RMX3551	July 2022	BOE OLED, 120 Hz	6.7"	1080 x 2412 (~393 ppi)	Qualcomm Snapdragon; 8+ Gen 1 1x 3.2 GHz Cortex-X2 + 3x 2.75 GHz Cortex-A710 + 4x 2.0 GHz Cortex-A510	Adreno 730 @900 MHz	8 GB; 12 GB (LPDDR5X)	256 GB (UFS 3.1)	50 MP OIS, f/1.88 + 50 MP, f/2.2 (ultrawide) + 2 MP, f/3.3 (microscope)	16 MP, f/2.5	5000 mAh (Li-Po)	USB-C, 100 W	Android 12	Android 13
Model name	Model number	Release date	Display type	Display size	Display resolution	SoC (Core/Freq)	GPU	RAM	Internal Storage	Rear	Front	Battery	Charging	Initial	Latest
Model name	Model number	Release date	Display type	Display size	Display resolution	SoC (Core/Freq)	GPU	RAM	Internal Storage	Camera		Battery	Charging	Operating system	

== Realme GT T Series ==
Model	Model number	Release date	Display type	Display size	Display resolution	SoC	GPU	RAM	Internal Storage	Camera		Battery	Charging	Operating system	
Model	Model number	Release date	Display type	Display size	Display resolution	SoC	GPU	RAM	Internal Storage	Rear	Front	Battery	Charging	Initial	Latest
Realme GT 6T	RMX3853	May 2024	LTPO AMOLED	6.78-inch	1264 × 2780 pixels	Snapdragon 7+ Gen 3 (4 nm)	Adreno 732	8 GB; 12 GB (LPDDR5X)	128 GB, 256 GB, 512 GB	50 MP f/1.88 + 8 MP f/2.2	32 MP f/2.45	5,500 mAh	120 W SuperVOOC fast charging	Android 14	Android 14 based Realme UI 5.0
Model	Model number	Release date	Display type	Display size	Display resolution	SoC	GPU	RAM	Internal Storage	Rear	Front	Battery	Charging	Initial	Latest
Model	Model number	Release date	Display type	Display size	Display resolution	SoC	GPU	RAM	Internal Storage	Camera		Battery	Charging	Operating system	

== See also ==
- Realme
- List of Realme products
