= X50 =

X50 or X-50 may refer to:

== Electronics ==
- Canon EOS Kiss X50, a digital single-lens reflex camera
- Dell Axim X50, a personal digital assistant
- Korg X50, a music workstation synthesizer
- Minolta DiMAGE X50, a digital viewfinder camera
- Realme X50 Pro, a smartphone
- Vivo X50, a line of Android-based smartphones

== Vehicles ==
=== Aircraft ===
- Boeing X-50 Dragonfly, an unmanned aerial vehicle

=== Automobiles ===
- Lifan X50, a 2014–present Chinese subcompact SUV
- Proton X50, a 2020–present Malaysian compact SUV
- Toyota Cresta (X50), a 1980–1984 Japanese mid-size sedan

== See also ==
- X5 (disambiguation)
