= ARM Cortex-A715 =

2022 CPU

General information
- Launched: 2022
- Designed by: ARM Ltd.

Cache
- L1 cache: 64/128 KiB (32/64 KiB I-cache with parity, 32/64 KiB D-cache) per core
- L2 cache: 128–512 KiB per core
- L3 cache: 256 KiB – 16 MiB (optional)

Architecture and classification
- Microarchitecture: ARM Cortex-A715
- Instruction set: ARMv9.0-A

Products, models, variants
- Product code name: Makalu
- Variant: ARM Cortex-X3

History
- Predecessor: ARM Cortex-A710
- Successor: ARM Cortex-A720

The ARM Cortex-A715 is the second generation ARMv9 "big" Cortex CPU. Compared to its predecessor the Cortex-A710 the Cortex-A715 CPU is noted for having a 20% increase in power efficiency, and 5% improvement in performance. The Cortex-A715 shows comparable performance to the previous generation Cortex-X1 CPU.

This generation of chips starting with the A715 drops native 32-bit support. It forms part of Arm's Total Compute Solutions 2022 (TCS22) along with Arm's Cortex-X3, Cortex-A510, Arm Immortalis-G715 and CoreLink CI-700/NI-700.

== Architecture changes in comparison with ARM Cortex-A710 ==
The processor implements the following changes:

- Decode width: 5 (increased from 4)
- Removed micro-op (MOP) cache (previously 1.5k entries)

== Usage ==
- MediaTek • Dimensity 8300 • Dimensity 9200
- Qualcomm • Snapdragon 8 Gen 2
- Google • Tensor G3

== Architecture comparison ==
"big" core

μArch	Cortex-A77	Cortex-A78	Cortex-A710	Cortex-A715	Cortex-A720	Cortex-A725
Codename	Deimos	Hercules	Matterhorn	Makalu	Hunter	Chaberton
Peak clock speed	2.6 GHz	~3.0 GHz				-
Architecture	ARMv8.2-A		ARMv9.0-A		ARMv9.2-A	
AArch	-	32-bit and 64-bit		64-bit		
Max In-flight	160	160	?	192+	?	-
L0 (Mops entries)	-	1536		0		-
L1 (I + D) (KiB)	64 + 64 KiB	32/64 + 32/64 KiB				64 + 64 KiB
L2 Cache (KiB)	256–512 KiB	128–512 KiB				0.25–1 MiB
L3 Cache (MiB)	0–4 MiB	0–8 MiB	0–16 MiB		0–32 MiB	
Decode width	4-way			5-way		
Dispatch	6 Mops/cycle		5 Mops/cycle		?	-

== See also ==
- ARM Cortex-X3, related high performance microarchitecture
- Comparison of ARMv8-A cores, ARMv8 family
