= GT6 =

GT6 may refer to:

- Gran Turismo 6, a 2013 sim racing video game
- Triumph GT6, a sports coupé built by Standard-Triumph from 1966 to 1973 in England
- Lohner GT6, a tram made by Lohner-Werke in Austria
- Duewag GT6, a tram made by Duewag in Germany
- Realme GT6, one of models of the Realme GT Series, an Android smartphone made by Realme in China
- Denel GT-6, a South African tank cannon

== See also ==
- GT6N, a tram series made by Adtranz in Germany
- GT64, a 1998 racing video game made by Imagineer in Japan
- GT 6xx, several models of the GeForce 600 series, a graphics processing unit made by Nvidia
- GTA6, or Grand Theft Auto VI, a 2026 video game
