= Lifan 520 =

Lifan 520/520i
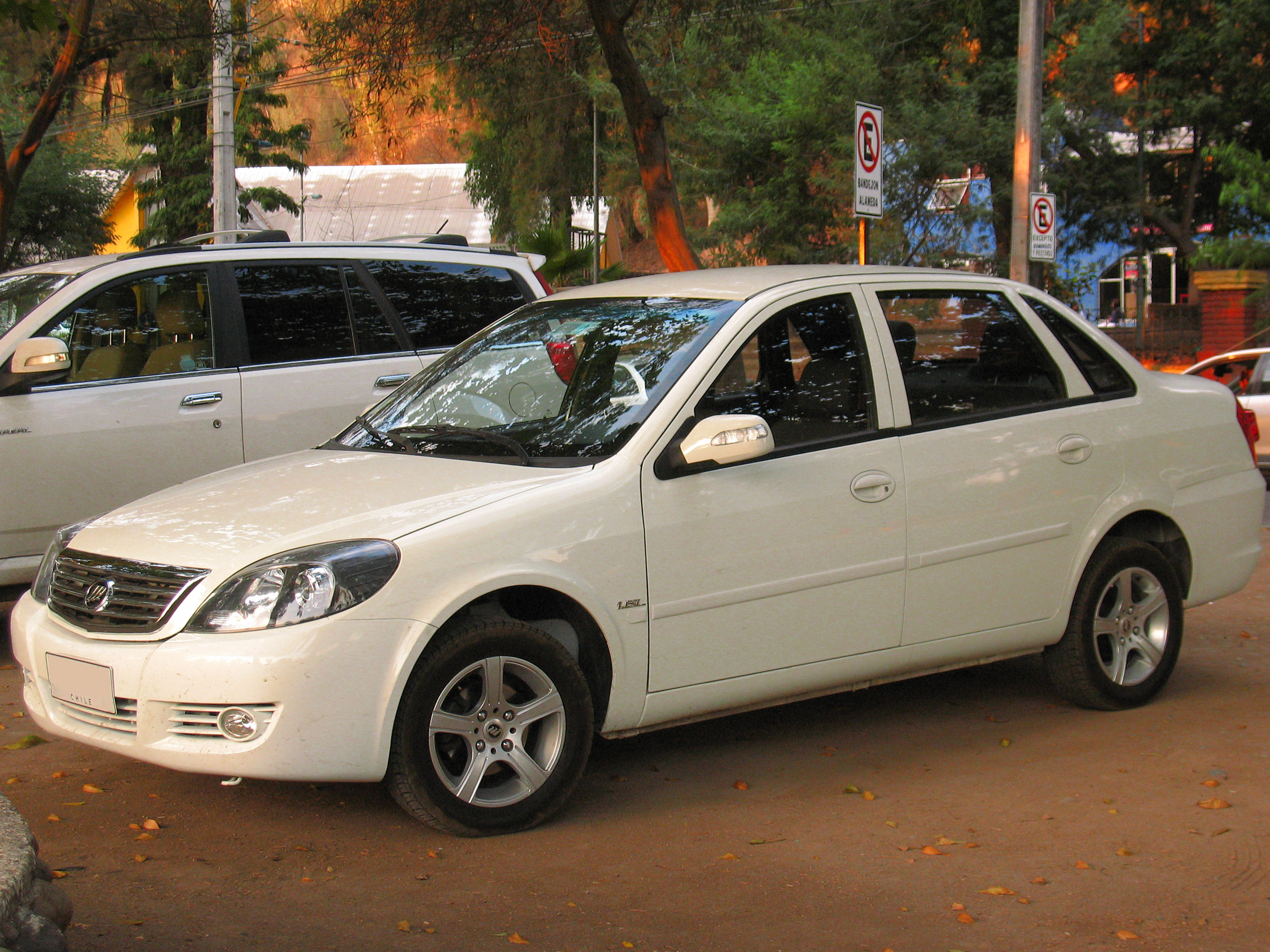

Overview
- Manufacturer: Lifan
- Also called: Lifan Breez (Russia)
- Production: 2006–2012
- Assembly: China: Chongqing; Russia: Cherkessk (Derways)

Body and chassis
- Class: Subcompact car
- Body style: 4-door sedan 5-door hatchback

Powertrain
- Engine: 1.3 L LF479Q1 I4; 1.5 L LF479Q2 I4; 1.6 L LF481Q3 I4
- Transmission: 5-speed manual 5 speed automatic

Dimensions
- Wheelbase: 2,540 mm (100.0 in)
- Length: 4,370 mm (172.0 in)
- Width: 1,700 mm (66.9 in)
- Height: 1,473 mm (58.0 in)

Chronology
- Successor: Lifan 530

The Lifan 520 is a subcompact sedan produced by the Lifan Motors division of Lifan Group.

== Overview ==
The Lifan 520 is the first car produced by Lifan Motors, and was launched at the 2006 Beijing Auto Show. The exterior and interior are specific to the 520 but the car is based in the chassis of the 1991 Citroën ZX. The 520 is a four-door sedan and the 520i is the 5-door hatchback version.

=== Powertrain ===
The Lifan 520 is powered by a choice of three 4-cylinder engines: the 1.3 L (1342cc) and 1.6 L (1587cc) Lifan engines producing 65 kW (88 PS; 87 bhp) and 78 kW (106 PS; 105 bhp) respectively; and the Tritec 85 kW (116 PS; 114 bhp) 1.6 L (1596cc) engine shared with the last-generation Mini.

=== Markets ===
The Lifan 520 is sold in China and in several export markets. In Russia, it is sold as the Lifan Breez.

== Gallery ==
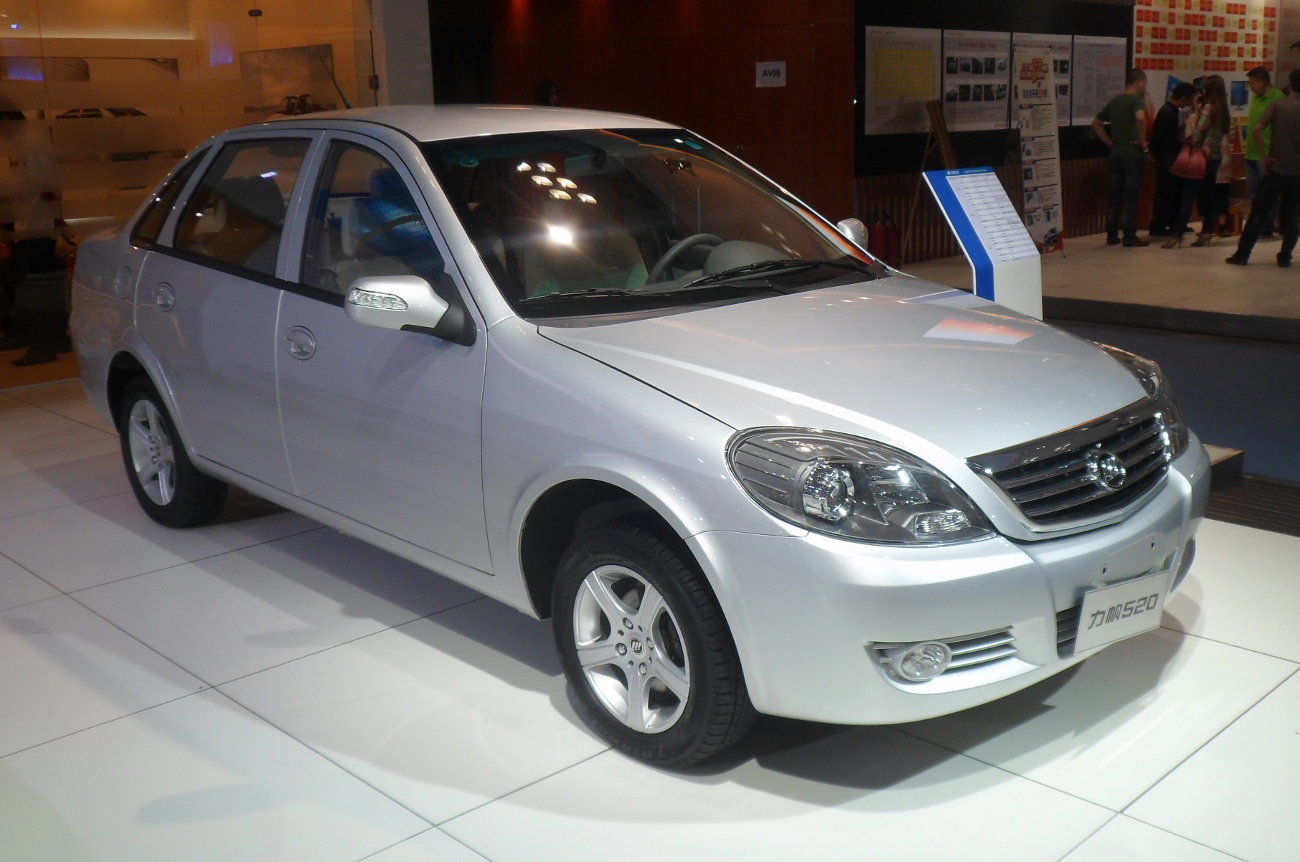
Lifan 520 front

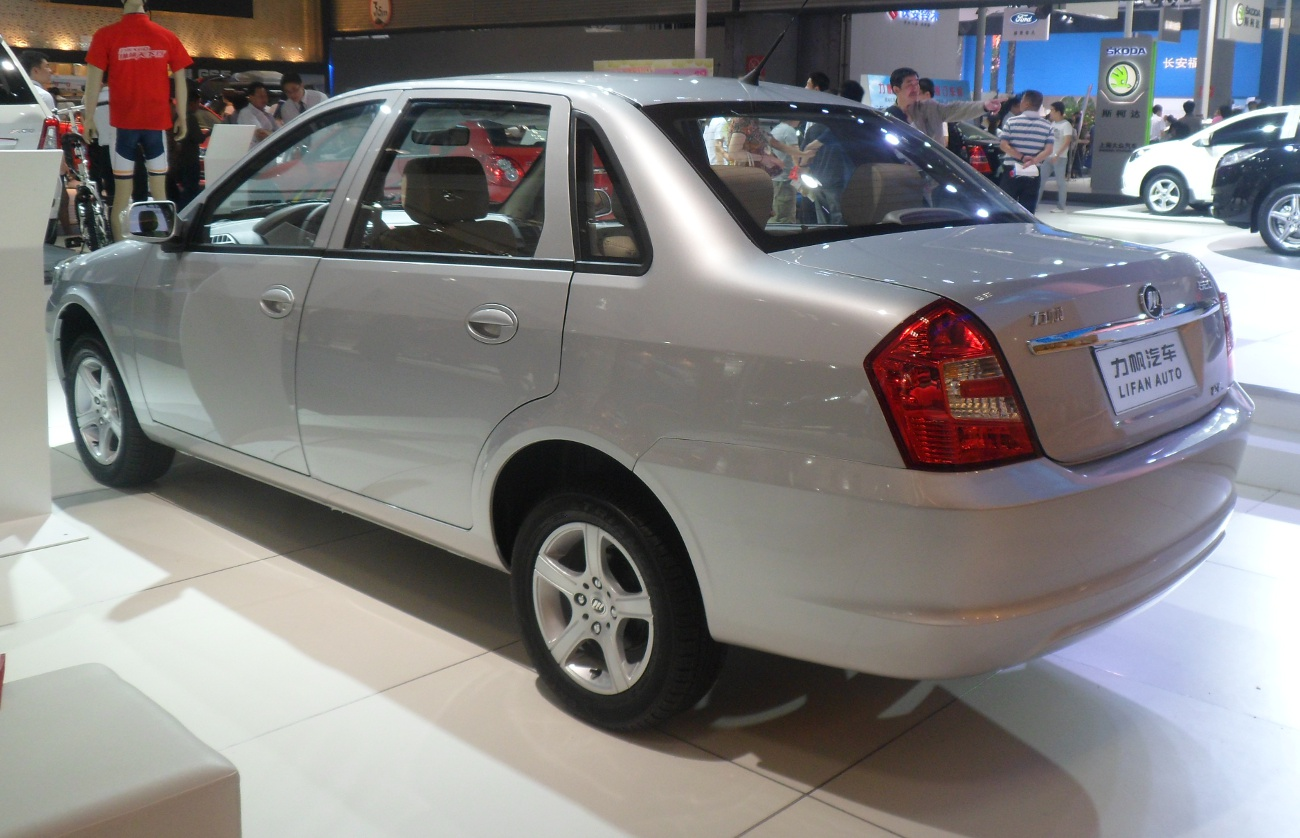
Lifan 520 rear

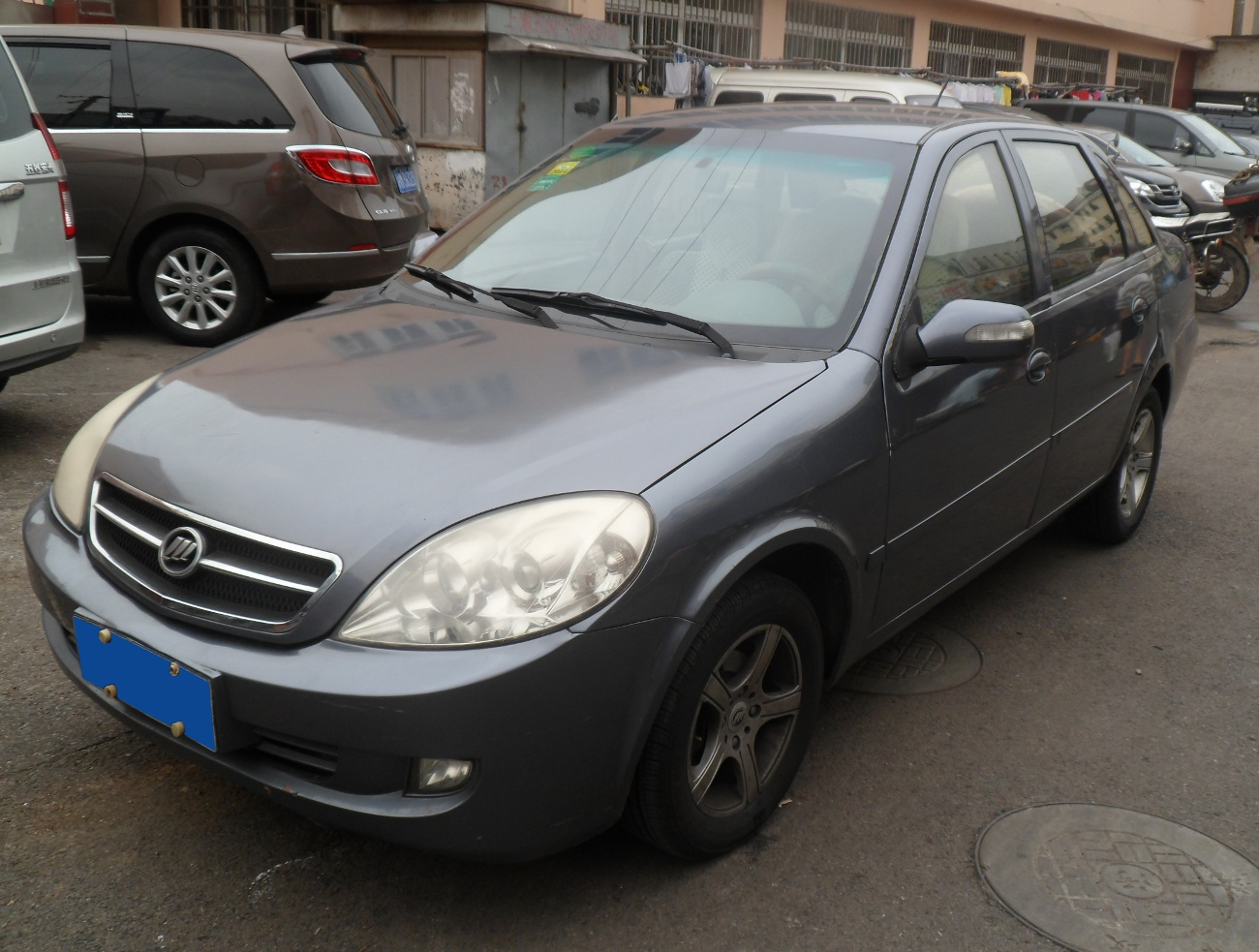
Lifan 520 facelift front

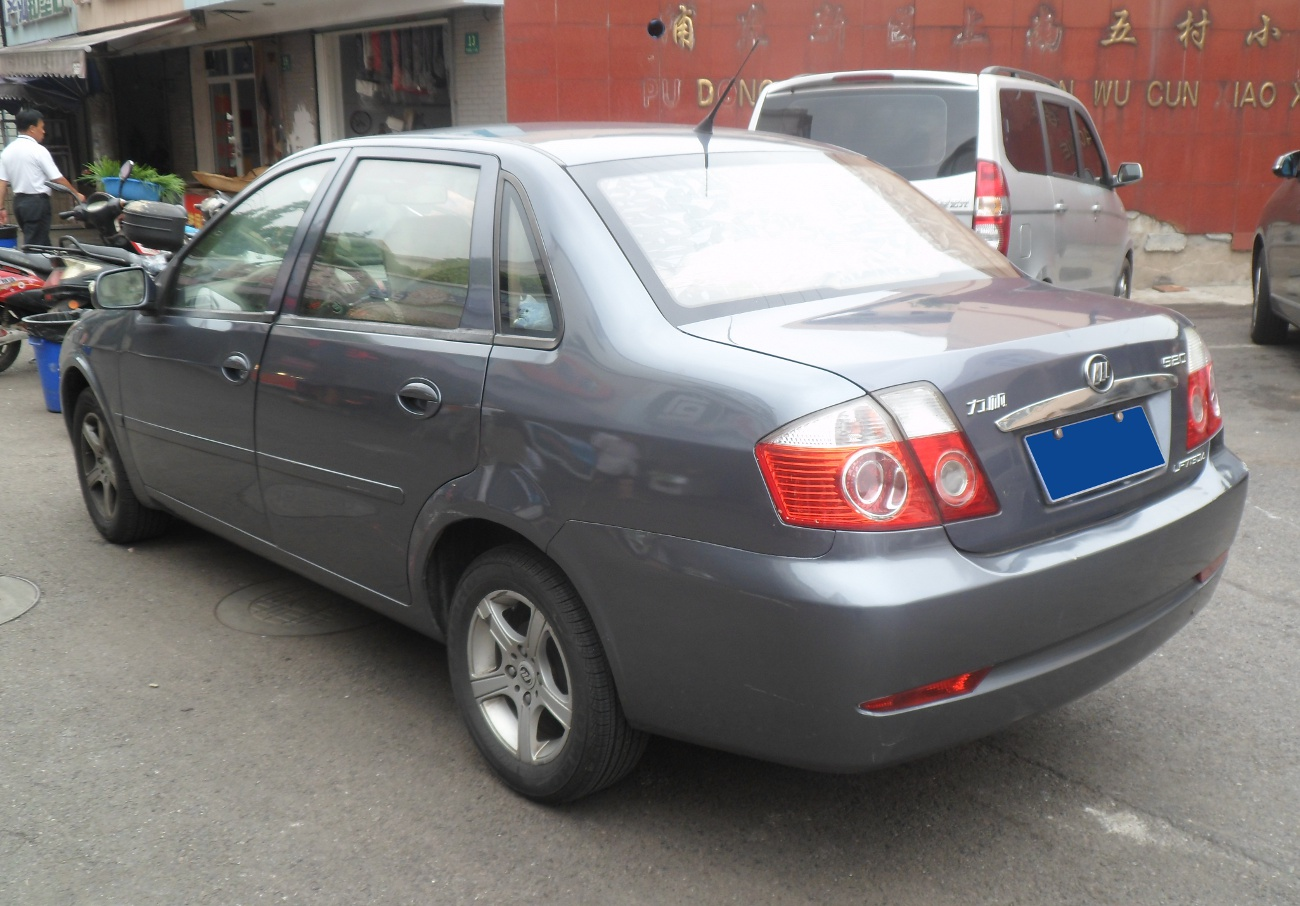
Lifan 520 facelift rear

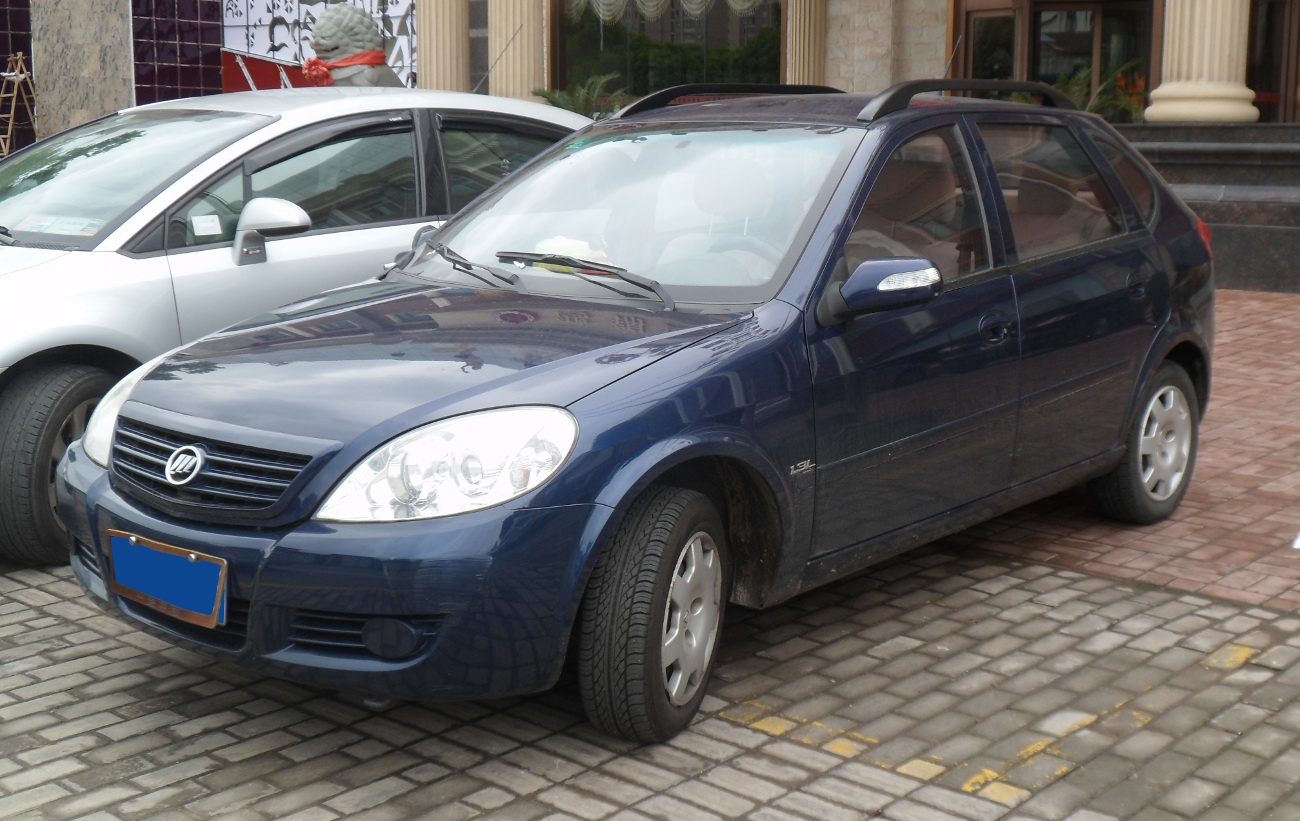
Lifan 520i front

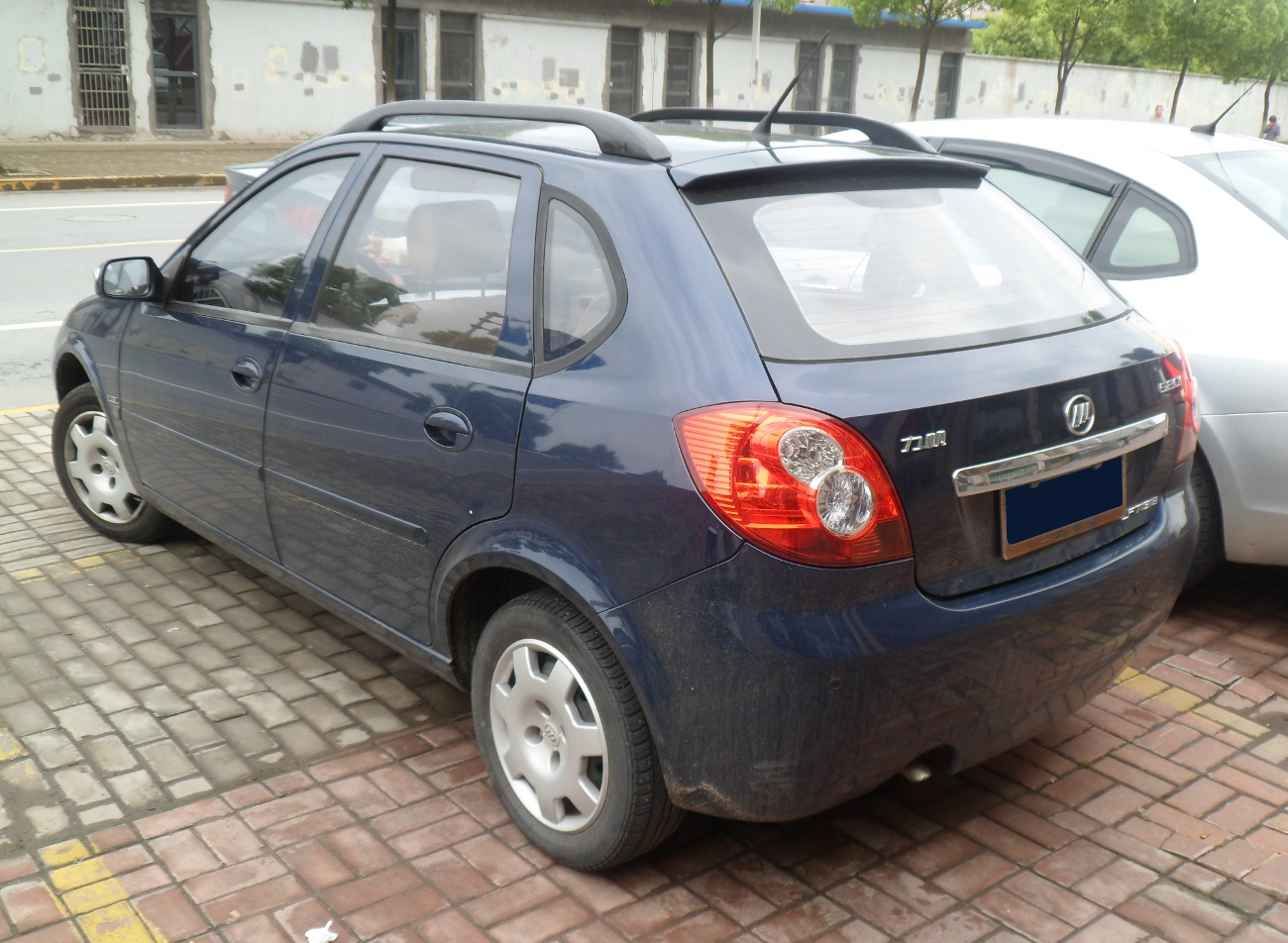
Lifan 520i rear

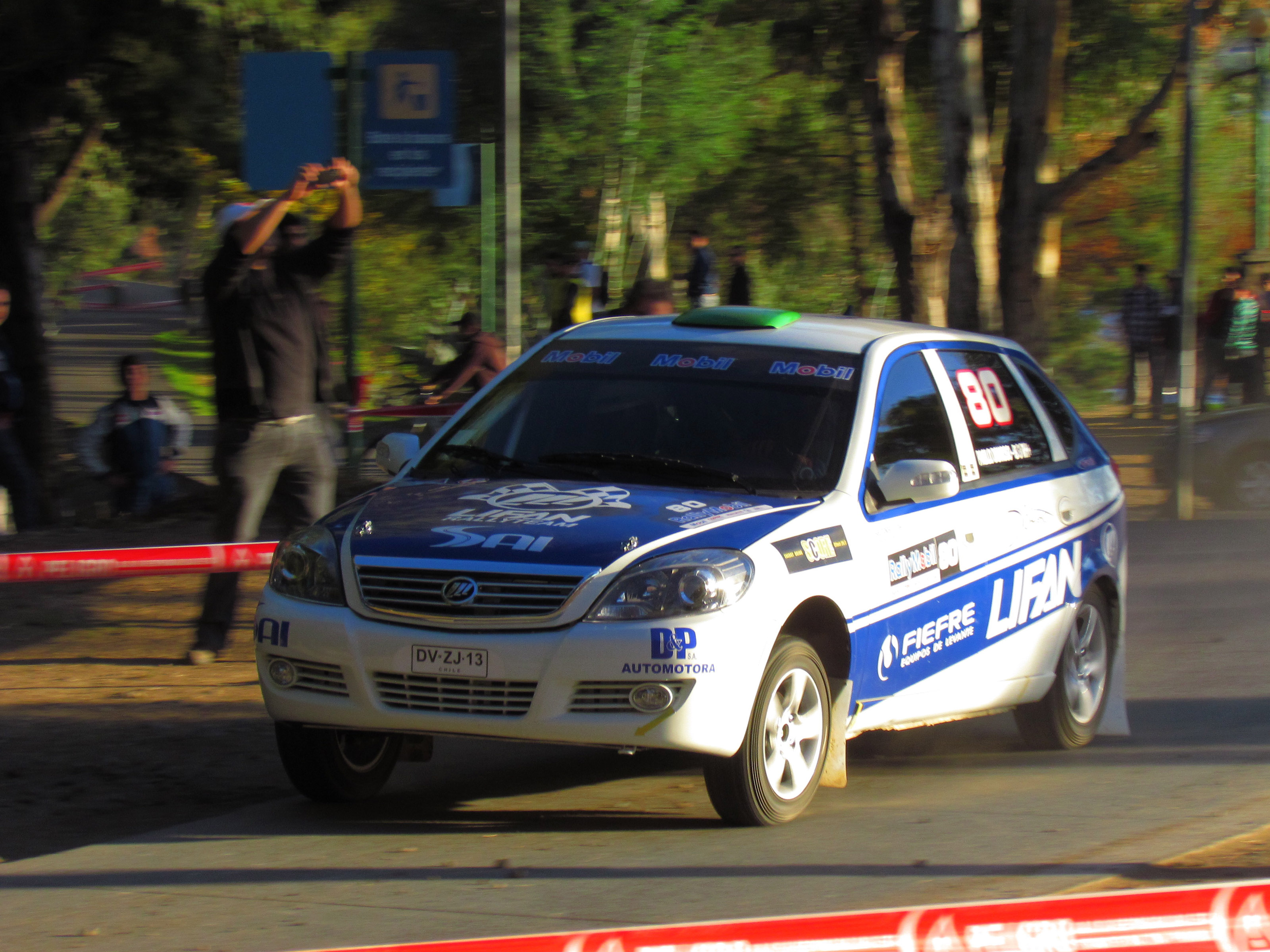
Lifan 520i rally car front

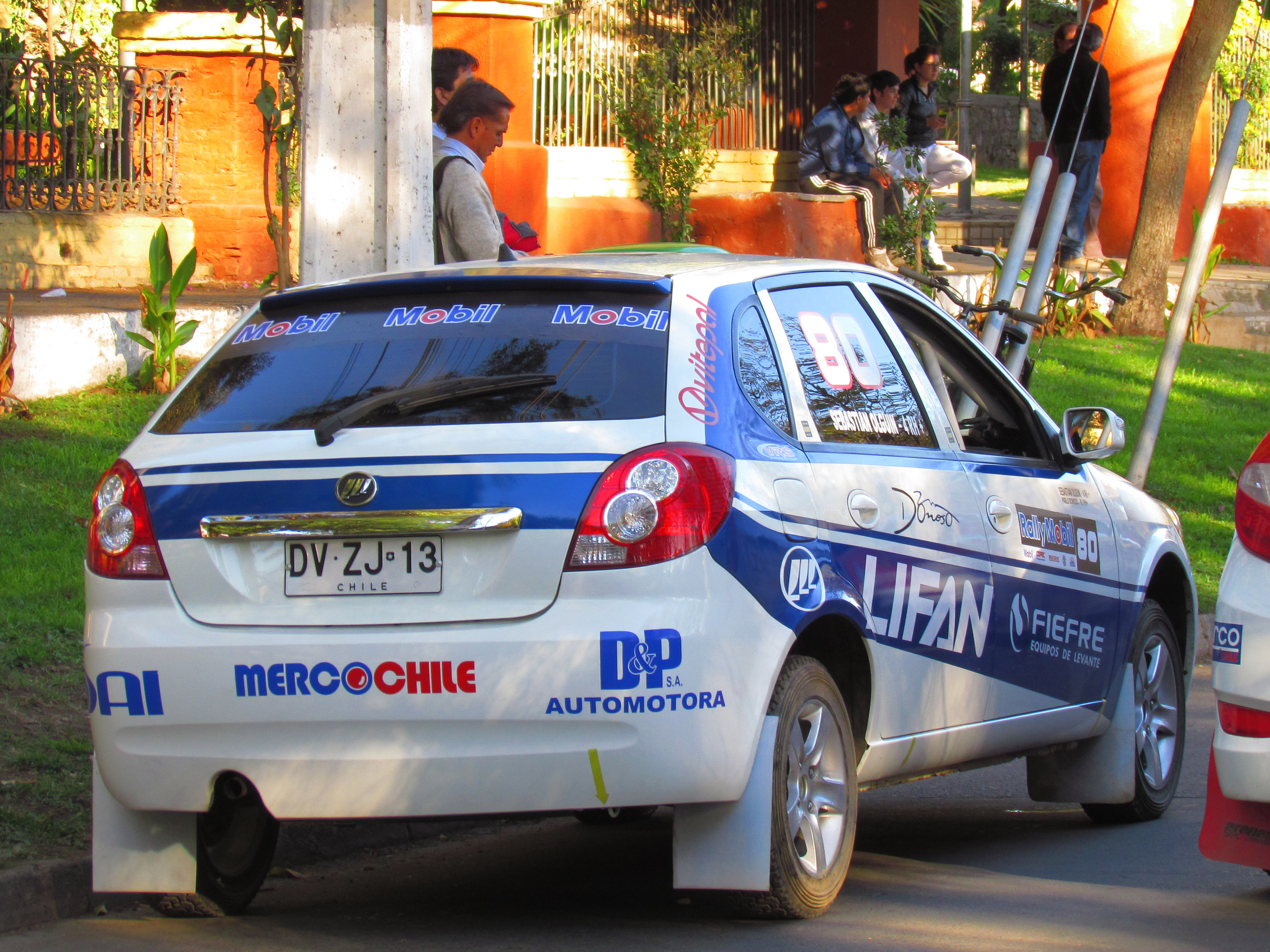
Lifan 520i rally car rear

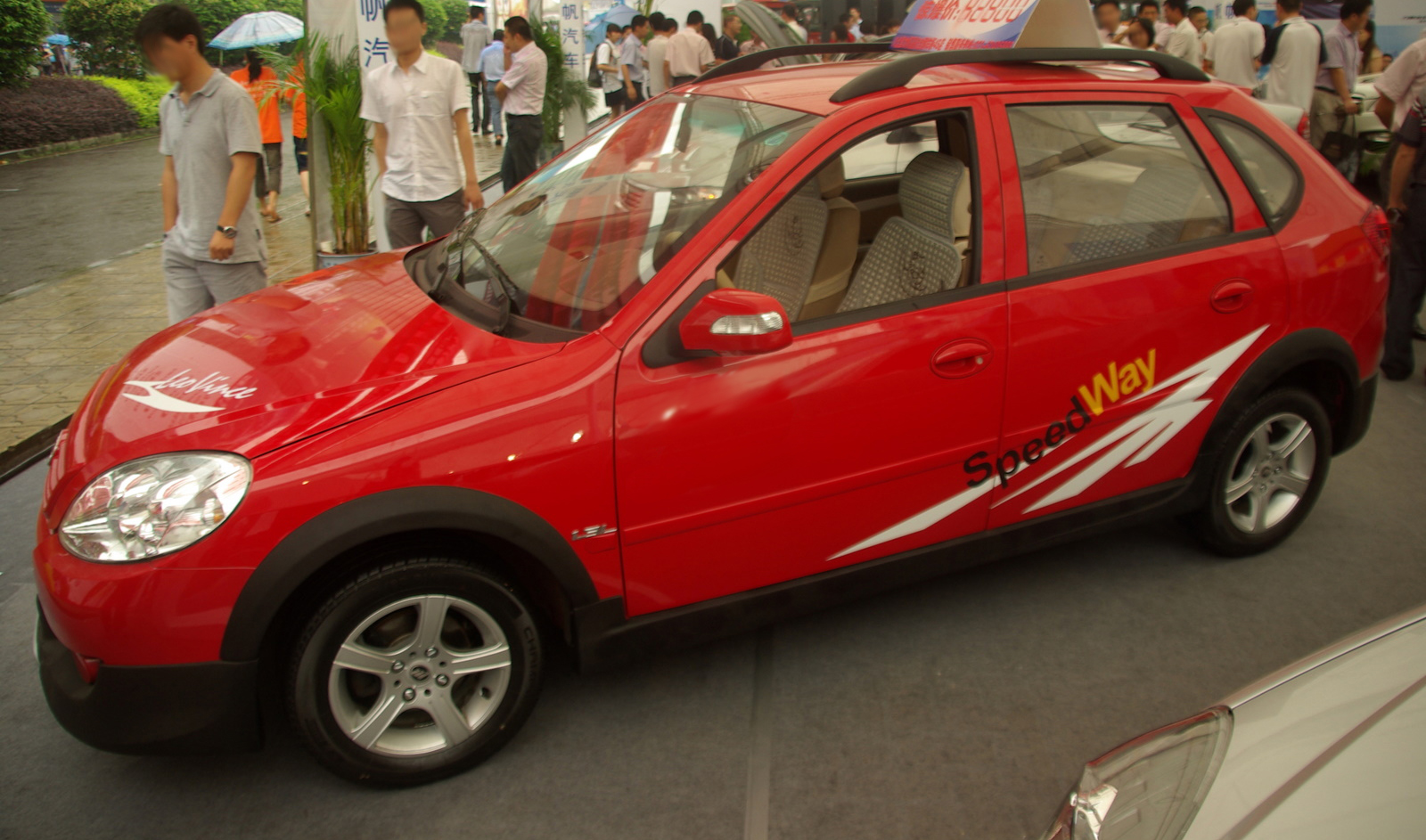
Lifan 520i cross.
