= Realme GT 6T =

2024 smartphone model

Realme GT 6T Realme GT Neo6 SE
- Brand: Realme
- Manufacturer: Oppo
- Type: Phablet
- Series: Realme GT
- First released: May 29, 2024
- Predecessor: Realme GT Neo5 SE
- Related: Realme GT Neo6
- Form factor: Slate
- Weight: 191 g (7 oz)
- Operating system: Android 14 with Realme UI 5
- System-on-chip: Qualcomm Snapdragon 7+ Gen 3
- GPU: Adreno 732
- Memory: GT 6T: 8 GB / 12 GB; GT Neo6 SE: 8 GB / 12 GB / 16 GB; LPDDR5X
- Storage: GT 6T: 128 GB / 256 GB / 512 GB; GT Neo6 SE: 256 GB / 512 GB; UFS 4.0
- Battery: 5500 mAh
- Charging: SuperVOOC fast charging GT 6T: 120W; GT Neo6 SE: 100W
- Rear camera: Dual: 50 MP (primary), 8 MP (ultra-wide)
- Front camera: 32 MP
- Display: 6.78-inch 1.5K LTPO AMOLED, 1264 x 2780 pixels, 120 Hz
- Sound: Stereo speakers
- Connectivity: 5G, 4G LTE, Wi-Fi 6, Bluetooth 5.4, USB-C 2.0
- Other: Iceberg Vapor Cooling System

The Realme GT 6T is an upper mid-range smartphone developed by Realme as a part of its Realme GT lineup. It was announced on May 22, 2024 and launched on May 29, 2024.

On the 11th of April 2024 in China, Realme introduced the Realme GT Neo 6 SE, which shares similar specifications with the Realme GT 6T, but features a different charging power.

== Features ==
=== Display ===
The GT 6T and GT Neo 6 SE feature a 6.78-inch 1.5K LTPO AMOLED display, which supports a 120Hz refresh rate and offers up to 6000 nits peak brightness. It is protected by Corning Gorilla Glass Victus 2.

=== Performance ===
GT 6T and GT Neo6 SE are the first smartphones powered by the Qualcomm Snapdragon 7+ Gen 3 chipset. GT 6T offers configurations up to 12 GB of RAM and 512 GB of storage, supplemented by a cooling system to manage thermal performance.

=== Camera ===
The devices include a dual rear camera setup with a 50MP primary sensor and an 8MP ultra-wide sensor, along with a 32MP front camera. The main rear camera is equipped with Optical Image Stabilization (OIS).

=== Battery and charging ===
They house a 5500 mAh battery supporting 120 W SuperVOOC fast charging in GT 6T, claiming significant charge within minutes, and 120 W SuperVOOC fast charging in GT Neo6 SE.

=== Software ===
The phones run on Realme UI 5 based on Android 14, with a promise of three years of major updates and four years of security updates.

== Critical response ==
Business Standard praised the phone's smooth performance and battery life. Fonearena praised the phone and called it a performance champ but gave average ratings to its camera. Digit gave it 7.2 out of 10 and praised its performance but criticized its design. 91mobiles gave it 8 out of 10 and praised its display and fast performance.
