= Realme X50 Pro =

Smartphone manufactured by Realme Mobile

realme X50 Pro 5G
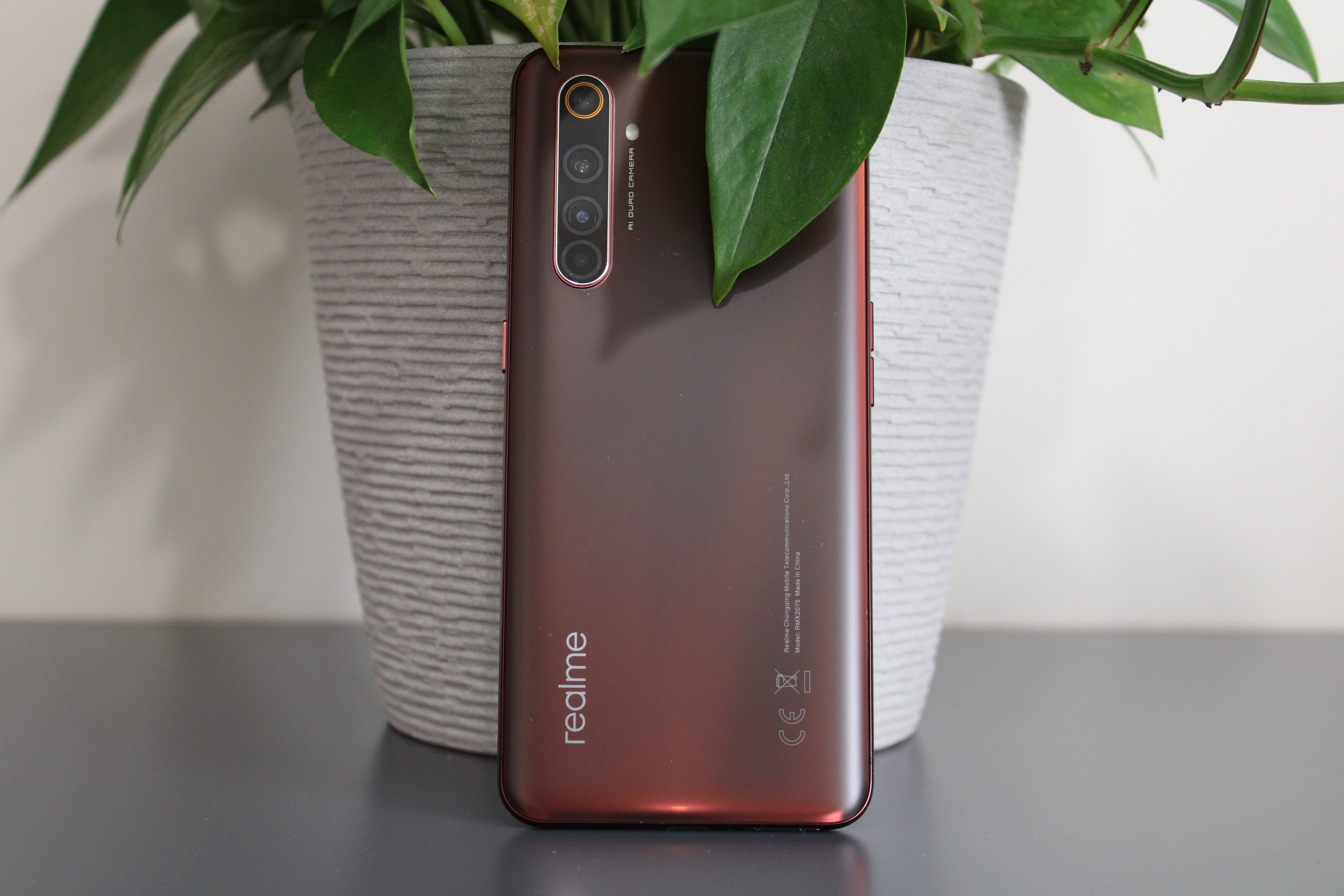
- Brand: realme
- Type: Smartphone
- Series: X
- Predecessor: realme X2 Pro
- Successor: realme GT
- Related: realme X50 realme X50 Pro Player Edition realme X3
- Colors: Moss Green, Rust Red
- Dimensions: 158.9×74.2×8.9 mm (6.26×2.92×0.35 in)
- Weight: 205 g (7 oz)
- Operating system: Initial: Android 10 with realme UI; Current: Android 12 with realme UI 3.0
- System-on-chip: Qualcomm Snapdragon 865 5G
- CPU: 7nm FFP, Octa-core, Up to 2.84GHz
- GPU: Adreno 650
- Storage: 128GB/256GB UFS 3.0
- Removable storage: None
- Battery: 4200mAh
- Rear camera: 64MP AI Quad Camera with 20x Zoom
- Front camera: dual 32MP + 8MP wide-angle camera
- Display: 16.4cm (6.44”) Fullscreen & 90Hz Ultra Smooth Display
- Sound: Stereo sound
- Website: www.realme.com/in/realme-x50-pro

The realme X50 Pro 5G is a smartphone from the Chinese company Realme, released in February 2020.

realme X50 Pro 5G comes with 5G networks on all spectrums from all over the world. The phone can be used in 5G-enabled countries and experience high speeds. The smartphone has a 6.44-inch full-HD+ Super AMOLED display with a refresh rate of 90Hz, protected by a Corning Gorilla Glass 5 on top.

The smartphone runs Android 10-based Realme UI. It comes with a 6.44-inch full-HD+ (1080x2400 pixels) display with a 90Hz refresh rate. The smartphone runs on Qualcomm Snapdragon 865 SoC comes with 12GB of RAM and 256GB of onboard storage. The Realme X50 Pro 5G is equipped with a 4200mAh battery with 65W SuperDART (Realme's branded version of Oppo's SuperVOOC) charging technology.
