= Realme GT =

Android 5G smartphone

realme GT / realme GT Neo (realme X7 Max in India) realme GT Neo Flash Edition realme GT Neo2T
- Brand: realme
- Type: Smartphone
- Series: GT series X series
- First released: GT: 4 March 2021; 5 years ago GT Neo: 31 March 2021; 5 years ago GT Neo Flash: 25 May 2021; 5 years ago X7 Max: 31 May 2021; 5 years ago GT Neo2T: 19 October 2021; 5 years ago
- Availability by region: GT: Worldwide; GT Neo/Neo Flash/Neo2T: China; X7 Max: India
- Predecessor: realme X50 Pro
- Successor: realme GT2
- Related: realme GT Master Edition realme X7 realme X7 Pro realme Q3 Pro
- Compatible networks: GSM, 3G, 4G (LTE), 5G
- Form factor: Slate
- Dimensions: 158.5×73.3×8.4 mm (6.24×2.89×0.33 in)
- Weight: GT/Neo2T: 186 g GT Neo/Neo Flash/X7 Max: 179 g
- Operating system: Initial: Android 11 with realme UI 2.0; Current: Android 13 with realme UI 4.0
- CPU: GT: Qualcomm Snapdragon 888 (5 nm), Octa-core (1×2.84 GHz Kryo 680 & 3×2.42 GHz Kryo 680 & 4×1.80 GHz Kryo 680); GT Neo/Neo Flash/Neo2T/X7 Max: MediaTek Dimensity 1200 (6 nm), Octa-core (1×3.0 GHz Cortex-A78 & 3×2.6 GHz Cortex-A78 & 4×2.0 GHz Cortex-A55)
- GPU: GT: Adreno 660; GT Neo/Neo Flash/Neo2T/X7 Max: Mali-G77 MC9
- Memory: GT/Neo Flash/Neo2T/X7 Max: 8/12 GB; GT Neo: 6/8/12 GB; LPDDR5
- Storage: GT/Neo/Neo2T/X7 Max: 128/256 GB; GT Neo Flash: 256 GB; UFS 3.1
- Battery: Non-removable Li-Po 4500 mAh
- Charging: GT/GT Neo Flash: 65W fast charging, 100% in 35 min (advertised); GT Neo/X7 Max: 50W fast charging, 50% in 16 min (advertised); GT Neo2T: 65W fast charging, 2.5W reverse charging
- Rear camera: 64 MP Sony IMX682, f/1.8, 26mm (wide), 1/1.73", 0.8 µm, PDAF + 8 MP, f/2.3, 15.7mm, 119° (ultrawide), 1/4.0", 1.12 µm, PDAF + 2 MP, f/2.4, 21.88mm, 88.8° (macro), 1/5.0", 1.75 µm Dual-LED dual-tone flash, HDR, panorama Video: 4K@30/60fps, 1080p@30/60/240fps, 720p@30/60/480fps; gyro-EIS
- Front camera: 16 MP, f/2.5, 26mm (wide), 1/3.0", 1.0 µm HDR, panorama Video: 1080p@30fps
- Display: Super AMOLED 6.43", 2400 × 1080 (FullHD+), 20:9 ratio, 409 ppi, 120 Hz
- Connectivity: USB-C 2.0, 3.5 mm jack, Bluetooth 5.1 (GT Neo/Neo Flash/Neo2T/X7 Max)/5.2 (GT), (A2DP, LE, aptX HD), NFC, Wi-Fi 802.11 a/b/g/n/ac/6 (dual-band, Wi-Fi Direct, hotspot), GPS, A-GPS, GLONASS, Galileo, BeiDou
- Data inputs: Multi-touch, 2 microphones, accelerometer, gyroscope, proximity sensor, compass, color temperature sensor
- Model: GT: RMX2202; GT Neo/X7 Max: RMX3031; GT Neo Flash: RMX3350; GT Neo2T: RMX3357
- Codename: GT: cupid GT Neo: cupida
- Other: Fingerprint (under display, optical)

The realme GT is a line of Android-based smartphones produced by realme, forming part of the flagship GT series. The model range consists of the realme GT, GT Neo and the GT Neo Flash Edition.

The realme GT was introduced on March 4, the GT Neo on March 31, and the GT Neo Flash Edition on May 25, 2021. In India, the realme GT Neo is sold as the realme X7 Max. Additionally, on October 19, 2021, the realme GT Neo2T was unveiled alongside the realme Q3s. It is positioned as a simplified version of the realme GT Neo2 and is very similar to the realme GT Neo Flash Edition, differing primarily in colors and support for reverse charging.

== Design ==
The screen is protected by Dragontrail glass. The back panel is made of glossy plastic or eco-leather, with a black glossy plastic stripe featured on the yellow version of the realme GT and GT Neo Flash Edition. The frame is constructed from plastic.

The bottom houses a USB-C port, speaker, microphone, and a 3.5 mm audio jack. An additional microphone is located at the top. The left side contains the volume buttons and a dual SIM card slot, while the power button is located on the right.

- realme GT: Available in Black, Blue, and Yellow.
- realme GT Neo: Available in Black, Silver, and Aurora (Orange-Purple).
- realme GT Neo Flash Edition: Available in Yellow, Black, Silver, and Aurora.
- realme X7 Max: Available in Asteroid Black, Mercury Silver, and Milky Way.
- realme GT Neo2T: Available in Black and White.

== Technical specifications ==
=== Hardware ===
The realme GT is powered by the Qualcomm Snapdragon 888 processor with an Adreno 660 GPU. The other models in the series utilize the MediaTek Dimensity 1200 processor paired with a Mali-G77 MC9 GPU.

=== Battery and charging ===
All models feature a 4500 mAh battery. The realme GT, GT Neo Flash Edition, and GT Neo2T support 65W fast charging, while the GT Neo and X7 Max support 50W fast charging. The GT Neo2T also supports 2.5W reverse wired charging.

=== Camera ===
All smartphone models feature a triple rear camera setup:

- 64 MP primary, f/1.8 (wide) with PDAF
- 8 MP ultrawide, f/2.3
- 2 MP macro / in-depth

The rear camera supports 4K video recording at 60fps. The front-facing camera is 16 MP, f/2.5 (wide), supporting 1080p video at 30fps.

=== Display ===
The device features a 6.43-inch Super AMOLED display with FullHD+ resolution (2400 × 1080), a 120 Hz refresh rate, and a pixel density of 409 ppi. It includes a punch-hole cutout for the front camera in the upper left corner and an integrated optical fingerprint scanner.

=== Audio ===
The series includes stereo speakers, where the earpiece doubles as a second speaker.

=== Memory and storage ===
The memory configurations differ from the following models:

- realme GT / X7 Max: 8/128 GB or 12/256 GB.
- realme GT Neo: 6/128 GB, 8/128 GB, or 12/256 GB.
- realme GT Neo Flash Edition: 8/256 GB or 12/256 GB.
- realme GT Neo2T: 8/128 GB, 8/256 GB, or 12/256 GB.

=== Software ===
The devices were launched with realme UI 2.0 based on Android 11. They have since been updated to realme UI 4.0 based on Android 13.
