= Lifan X50 =

Chinese subcompact crossover

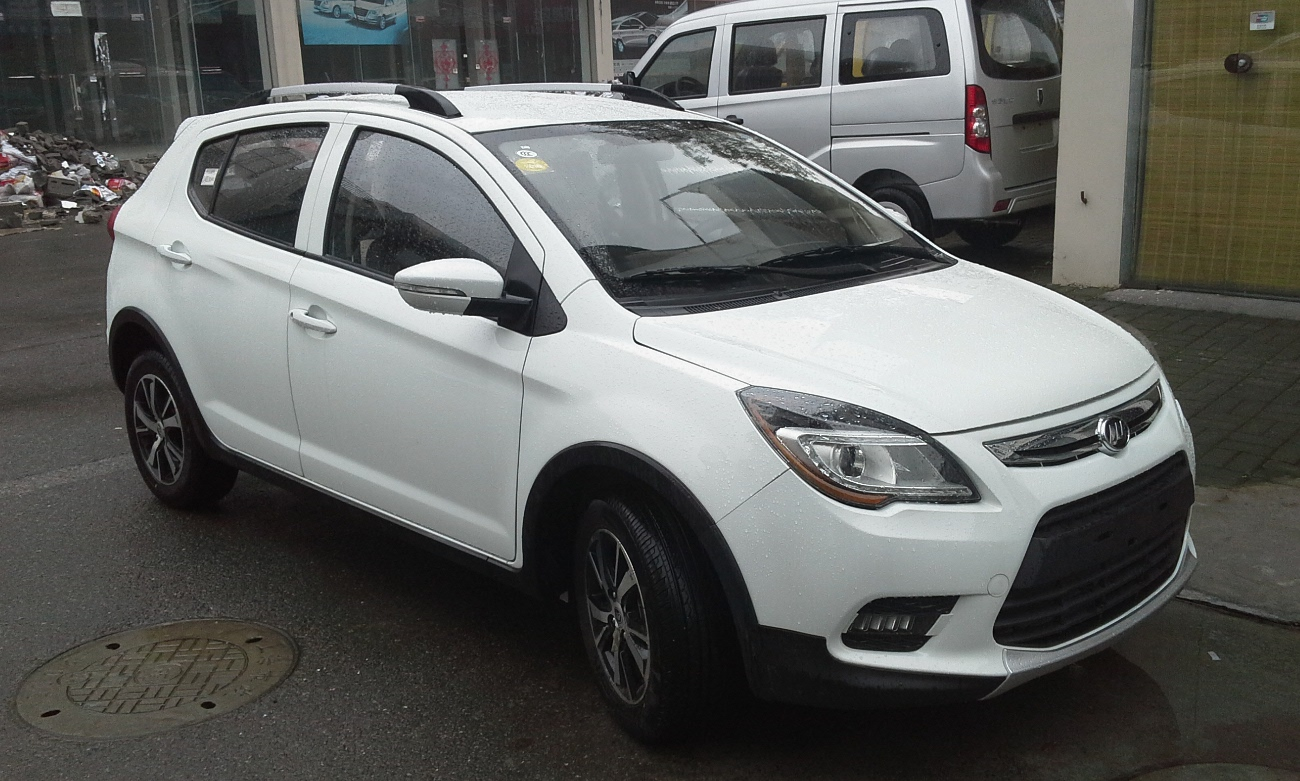

Overview
- Manufacturer: Lifan
- Production: 2014–2019; 2015–2018 (Iran); 2015–2020 (Russia)
- Assembly: China: Chongqing; Russia: Cherkessk (Derways); Iran: Kerman (KMC); Uruguay: San José

Body and chassis
- Class: Subcompact crossover SUV
- Body style: 5-door hatchback
- Related: Lifan 530

Powertrain
- Engine: 1.3 L I4 petrol engine 1.5 L I4 petrol engine
- Transmission: 5-speed manual; CVT automatic

Dimensions
- Wheelbase: 2,550 mm (100.4 in)
- Length: 4,100 mm (161.4 in)
- Width: 1,722 mm (67.8 in)
- Height: 1,540 mm (60.6 in)

The Lifan X50 is a Chinese five-door subcompact crossover SUV produced by the Lifan Motors division of Lifan Group. Positioning below the Lifan X60 compact crossover, it was initially unveiled at the 2013 Guangzhou Auto Show, and it is based on the same platform as the subcompact Lifan 530 sedan, being essentially the lifted hatchback version of the Lifan 530.

== Overview ==
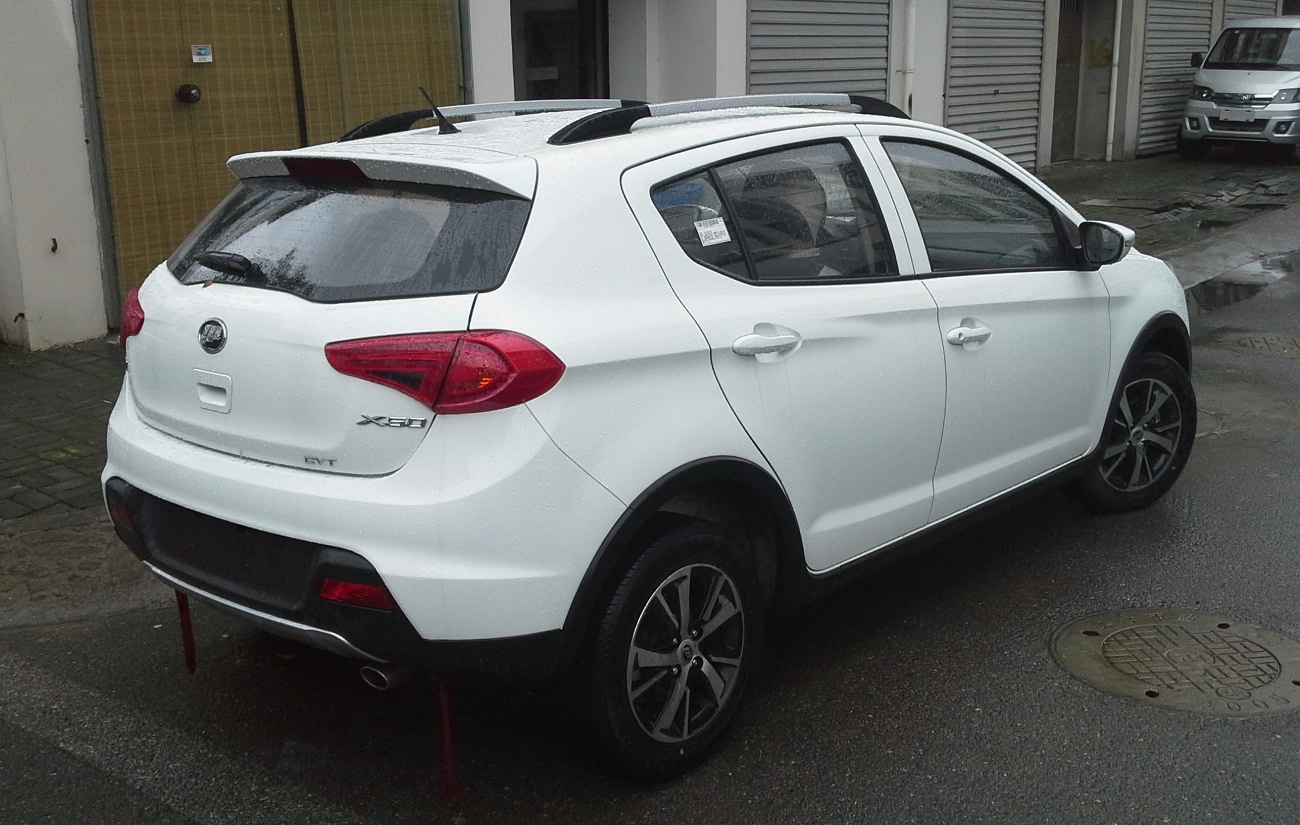
Lifan X50 rear

The Lifan X50 was originally planned to be available to the Chinese market in September 2014, and it is powered by either a 4-cylinder 1.3 L (1794cc) engine producing 93 kW (126 PS; 125 bhp) or a 1.5 L (1794cc) engine producing 102 kW (139 PS; 137 bhp).

Finally available to the Chinese auto market in November 2014, the Lifan X50 was priced between 59,800 yuan to 82,800 yuan.
