= Realme GT Master Edition =

Realme mid-range smartphone

realme GT Master Edition
- Brand: Realme
- Developer: Realme
- Manufacturer: OPPO
- Type: Smartphone
- Series: GT series
- First released: July 21, 2021; 5 years ago
- Predecessor: realme X2 Pro Master Edition
- Successor: Realme GT2 Master Explorer Edition
- Compatible networks: GSM, 3G, 4G, LTE, 5G
- Form factor: Slate
- Colors: Voyager Grey, Cosmos Black, Luna White, Aurora
- Dimensions: 159.2 mm (6.27 in) H 73.5 mm (2.89 in) W 8.0 mm (0.31 in) D (plastic) / 8.7 mm (0.34 in) D (leather)
- Weight: 174 g (6.1 oz) (plastic); 180 g (6.3 oz) (leather)
- Operating system: Original: Android 11 with realme UI 2.0; Current: Android 13 with realme UI 4.0
- System-on-chip: Qualcomm Snapdragon 778G 5G (6 nm)
- CPU: Octa-core (4×2.4 GHz Kryo 670 & 4×1.9 GHz Kryo 670)
- GPU: Adreno 642L
- Memory: 6 or 8 GB LPDDR4X
- Storage: 128 or 256 GB UFS 2.2
- Removable storage: No
- SIM: Dual SIM (Nano-SIM, dual stand-by)
- Battery: Non-removable Li-Po 4300 mAh
- Charging: Fast charging 65W
- Rear camera: 64 MP, f/1.8, 25mm (wide), 1/2", 0.7µm, PDAF; 8 MP, f/2.3, 16mm, 119° (ultrawide), 1/4.0", 1.12µm 2 MP, f/2.4, (macro); LED flash, HDR, panorama Video: 4K@30fps, 1080p@30/60fps, gyro-EIS
- Front camera: 32 MP, f/2.5, 26mm (wide), 1/2.74", 0.8µm HDR, panorama Video: 1080p@30fps
- Display: Super AMOLED, 120Hz, 1000 nits (peak); 6.43 inches, 99.8 cm^{2} (~85.3% screen-to-body ratio); 1080 × 2400 pixels, 20:9 ratio (~409 ppi density)
- Model: RMX3360, RMX3361, RMX3363
- Website: www.realme.com/global/realme-gt-master-edition

The realme GT Master Edition (shortened as the realme GT ME) is a mid-range Android-based smartphone manufactured and marketed by Realme. It belongs to the upper-mid-range GT series and was officially announced and released on 21 July 2021 in China.

Following its announcement, it was released on August 18, 2021 in India and Europe, and sale start globally on August 23.

== Design ==
The front screen of the realme GT Master Edition is made of glass. The back panel is constructed from matte plastic or eco-leather in the Voyager Grey color variant. The side frame is made of glossy plastic.

The bottom edge features a USB-C port, speaker, primary microphone, and a 3.5 mm headphone jack. An auxiliary microphone is located at the top. The left side houses the volume buttons and a dual SIM card slot, while the right side contains the power button.

The eco-leather variant (Voyager Grey) was designed in collaboration with Japanese designer Naoto Fukasawa, who stated that the design was inspired by travel suitcases in select models.

The smartphone was measured at 159.2 (h) x 73.5 (w) x 8.0 (d) mm and weights at 173 g.

The realme GT Master Edition was released in four color variants: Voyager Grey, Cosmos Black, Luna White, and Aurora.

== Specifications ==
=== Hardware and performance ===
The realme GT Master Edition is powered by the Qualcomm Snapdragon 778G processor alongside an Adreno 642L GPU.

It is equipped with a 4300 mAh non-removable battery featuring support for 65W SuperDart fast charging.

=== Cameras ===
The device features a triple rear camera setup:

- 64 MP primary sensor, f/1.8 aperture (wide), phase detection autofocus (PDAF) and an 80.5° field of view with OmniVision sensor
- 8 MP ultrawide lens, manufacutred by SK Hynix, f/2.3 aperture with a 119° field of view
- 2 MP macro lens, f/2.4 aperture

The rear camera system supports 4K video recording at 30 fps with gyro-EIS. The front selfie camera has a 32 MP sensor with an f/2.5 aperture, supporting 1080p video recording at 30 fps.

=== Display ===
The smartphone utilizes a 6.43-inch Super AMOLED display with a resolution of 2400 × 1080 (Full HD+), a 20:9 aspect ratio, 120Hz refresh rate, and a pixel density of 409 ppi. It includes an optical under-display fingerprint scanner and a hole-punch cutout for the selfie camera in the upper-left corner.

=== Memory ===
The realme GT Master Edition features a "RAM Expansion Technology", and was offered in global configurations of 6 GB or 8 GB of LPDDR4X RAM paired with 128 GB or 256 GB of UFS 2.2 internal storage.

=== Software ===
The smartphone originally launched with realme UI 2.0 based on Android 11. It was later updated to realme UI 4.0 based on Android 13.
