= Realme X3 =

Android smartphone manufactured by Realme

realme X3 realme X3 SuperZoom
- Brand: Realme
- Manufacturer: OPPO
- Type: Phablet
- Series: X
- First released: X3 SuperZoom: May 26, 2020; 6 years ago X3: June 25, 2020; 6 years ago
- Availability by region: X3 SuperZoom May 26, 2020: India; Spain; United Kingdom; July 9, 2020: Philippines
- Predecessor: realme X2 realme X2 Pro
- Successor: realme X7 realme X7 Pro
- Related: realme X50 realme 6 Pro
- Compatible networks: GSM, 3G, 4G (LTE)
- Form factor: Slate
- Dimensions: 163.8×75.8×8.9 mm (6.45×2.98×0.35 in)
- Weight: 202 g (7 oz)
- Operating system: Original: Android 10 with realme UI 1 Current: Android 12 with realme UI 3
- CPU: Qualcomm SM8150 Snapdragon 855+ (7 nm), octa-core (1×2.96 GHz Kryo 485 & 3×2.42 GHz Kryo 485 & 4×1.78 GHz Kryo 485)
- GPU: Adreno 640 (700 MHz)
- Memory: X3: 6/8 GB; X3 SuperZoom: 8/12 GB; LPDDR4X
- Storage: X3: 128 GB; X3 SuperZoom: 128/256 GB; UFS 3.0
- Battery: Non-removable, Li-Po 4200 mAh
- Charging: 30W fast charging, 100% in 55 min (advertised)
- Rear camera: X3: 64 MP, f/1.8, 26 mm (wide), 1/1.72", 0.8 µm, PDAF + 12 MP, f/2.5, 51 mm (telephoto), PDAF, 2x optical zoom + 8 MP, f/2.3, 119˚, 16 mm (ultrawide), 1/4.0", 1.12 µm + 2 MP, f/2.4 (macro); X3 SuperZoom: 64 MP, f/1.8, 26 mm (wide), 1/1.72", 0.8 µm, PDAF + 8 MP, f/3.4, 124 mm (periscope telephoto), OIS, PDAF, 5x optical, 60x digital zoom + 8 MP, f/2.3, 119˚, 16 mm (ultrawide), 1/4.0", 1.12 µm + 2 MP, f/2.4 (macro); LED flash, HDR, panorama Video: 4K@30/60fps, 1080p@30/60/120fps, gyro-EIS
- Front camera: X3: 16 MP, f/2.0, 26 mm (wide), 1/3.06", 1.0 µm + 8 MP, f/2.2, 105˚ (ultrawide), 1/4.0", 1.12 µm X3 SuperZoom: 32 MP, f/2.5, 26 mm (wide), 1/2.8", 0.8 µm + 8 MP, f/2.2, 105˚ (ultrawide), 1/4.0", 1.12 µm panorama Video: 1080p@30fps, gyro-EIS
- Display: IPS LCD, 6.6", 2400 × 1080 pixels (FullHD+), 20:9 ratio, 399 ppi, 120 Hz
- Connectivity: USB-C 2.0, Bluetooth 5 (A2DP, LE), NFC (X3 SuperZoom only), Wi-Fi 802.11 a/b/g/n/ac (dual-band, Wi-Fi Direct, hotspot), GPS, A-GPS, GLONASS, BeiDou, Galileo, QZSS
- Other: Fingerprint sensor (side-mounted), accelerometer, gyroscope, proximity sensor, compass

The realme X3 and realme X3 SuperZoom are Android smartphones developed and marketed by Realme, forming part of the brand's flagship and sub-flagship "X" series. The Realme X3 SuperZoom was released on May 26, 2020 for Britain, Spain, and Indian markets, followed by the standard realme X3 on June 25, 2020.

In Philippine markets, the X3 SuperZoom released on July 9 in that year, along with the realme Watch.

The primary distinguishing feature of the X3 SuperZoom is its periscope telephoto lens camera setup, capable of 5x optical zoom and up to 60x digital zoom.

== Design ==
The front display is protected by Corning Gorilla Glass 5, and the rear panel is constructed from glass. The side frame is made of plastic.

In terms of external design, both smartphones are virtually identical. The singular visual distinction lies within the rear camera module's telephoto lens accent border: the standard realme X3 features a circular accent ring, while the X3 SuperZoom features a square accent border.

The bottom edge houses a USB-C port, loudspeaker, main microphone, and a dual SIM card slot. A secondary microphone is positioned at the top edge. The left side accommodates the volume adjustment buttons, while the right side contains the power button, which doubles as an integrated capacitive fingerprint scanner.

The devices were produced in two color variants: Arctic White and Glacier Blue.

== Specifications ==
=== Hardware ===
Both devices are powered by a Qualcomm Snapdragon 855+ system-on-chip paired with an Adreno 640 graphics processing unit.

=== Battery ===
The phones feature a 4200 mAh internal battery that supports proprietary 30W wired fast charging.

=== Camera ===
The realme X3 features a quad-rear camera setup comprising a 64 MP primary camera with an f/1.8 aperture (wide), a 12 MP telephoto lens with an f/2.5 aperture and 2x optical zoom, an 8 MP ultrawide lens with an f/2.3 aperture, and a 2 MP macro lens with an f/2.4 aperture. The front-facing configuration includes a dual-camera layout with a 16 MP main sensor with an f/2.0 aperture alongside an 8 MP ultrawide sensor with an f/2.3 aperture offering a 105˚ field of view.

The realme X3 SuperZoom alternates the telephoto layout, utilizing an 8 MP periscope telephoto lens with an f/3.4 aperture featuring optical image stabilization (OIS) that enables 5x optical zoom and 60x digital zoom. The remaining rear sensors consist of a 64 MP main wide sensor, an 8 MP ultrawide lens, and a 2 MP macro lens. Its dual front-facing array features a upgraded 32 MP main sensor with an f/2.5 aperture paired with the same 8 MP ultrawide sensor.

The primary rear camera array on both variants supports video recording up to 4K at 60fps, while the front cameras support recording up to 1080p at 30fps.

=== Display ===
The device utilizes a 6.6-inch IPS LCD display featuring a resolution of 2400 × 1080 pixels (FullHD+) with a 20:9 aspect ratio. The screen panel offers a pixel density of 399 ppi, a 120 Hz refresh rate, and an elongated punch-hole cutout to accommodate the dual front-facing camera array.

=== Storage and memory ===
The standard realme X3 was distributed in configurations containing either 6 GB or 8 GB of RAM paired with 128 GB of internal storage.

The realme X3 SuperZoom variant expanded options, offering choices between 8 GB or 12 GB of RAM alongside 128 GB or 256 GB of internal storage.

=== Software ===
Both smartphones originally shipped with realme UI 1 operating software built upon Android 10. The devices were later updated to realme UI 3 (open beta and official version) based on the Android 12 platform.
