= ARM Cortex-A710 =

CPU core developed by Arm Holdings

General information
- Launched: 2021
- Designed by: ARM Ltd.

Cache
- L1 cache: 64/128 KiB (32/64 KiB I-cache with parity, 32/64 KiB D-cache) per core
- L2 cache: 256/512 KiB per core
- L3 cache: 256 KiB – 16 MiB (optional)

Architecture and classification
- Microarchitecture: ARM Cortex-A710
- Instruction set: ARMv9.0-A

Products, models, variants
- Product code name: Matterhorn
- Variant: ARM Cortex-X2

History
- Predecessor: ARM Cortex-A78
- Successor: ARM Cortex-A715

The ARM Cortex-A710 is the successor to the ARM Cortex-A78, being the First-Generation Armv9 "big" Cortex CPU. It is the companion to the ARM Cortex-A510 "LITTLE" efficiency core. It was designed by ARM Ltd.'s Austin centre. It is the fourth and last iteration of Arm's Austin core family.

It forms part of Arm's Total Compute Solutions 2021 (TCS21) along with Arm's Cortex-X2, Cortex-A510, Mali-G710 and CoreLink CI-700/NI-700.

== Architecture changes in comparison with ARM Cortex-A78 ==
The processor implements the following changes:

- Rename / Dispatch width: 5 (decreased from 6).
- 10-cycle pipeline (decreased from 11).
- One of only two ARMv9 cores to support EL0 AArch32, along with the ARM Cortex-A510.

Improvements:

- 30% more power efficient than Cortex-A78.
- 10% uplift in performance compared to Cortex-A78
- 2x ML uplift

== Architecture comparison ==
"big" core

μArch	Cortex-A77	Cortex-A78	Cortex-A710	Cortex-A715	Cortex-A720	Cortex-A725
Codename	Deimos	Hercules	Matterhorn	Makalu	Hunter	Chaberton
Peak clock speed	2.6 GHz	~3.0 GHz				-
Architecture	ARMv8.2-A		ARMv9.0-A		ARMv9.2-A	
AArch	-	32-bit and 64-bit		64-bit		
Max In-flight	160	160	?	192+	?	-
L0 (Mops entries)	-	1536		0		-
L1 (I + D) (KiB)	64 + 64 KiB	32/64 + 32/64 KiB				64 + 64 KiB
L2 Cache (KiB)	256–512 KiB	128–512 KiB				0.25–1 MiB
L3 Cache (MiB)	0–4 MiB	0–8 MiB	0–16 MiB		0–32 MiB	
Decode width	4-way			5-way		
Dispatch	6 Mops/cycle		5 Mops/cycle		?	-

== Usage ==
- Qualcomm Snapdragon 7 Gen 1, Snapdragon 7+ Gen 2, Snapdragon 8/8+ Gen 1
- MediaTek Dimensity 9000/9000+
- Samsung Exynos 2200

== See also ==
- ARM Cortex-X2, related high performance microarchitecture
- Comparison of ARMv8-A cores, ARMv8 family
