= Realme X2 Pro =

2019 smartphone produced by Realme

- Brand: Realme
- Manufacturer: Realme
- Type: Phablet
- Series: Realme X Series
- Predecessor: Realme X
- Successor: Realme X50 Pro 5G; Realme X3 SuperZoom
- Form factor: Slate
- Dimensions: 161 mm × 75.7 mm × 8.7 mm (6.34 in × 2.98 in × 0.34 in)
- Weight: 199 g (7.02 oz)
- Operating system: Original: Android 9.0 "Pie" (Skinned with ColorOS); Current: Android 11 (China, Global beta), Android 10 (Global) (Skinned with realme UI)
- System-on-chip: Qualcomm Snapdragon 855+
- CPU: Octa-core Kryo 485 (1×2.96 GHz, 3×2.42 GHz, 4×1.8 GHz)
- GPU: Adreno 640
- Memory: 6 GB, 8 GB, or 12 GB LPDDR4X RAM
- Storage: 64 GB UFS 2.1, 128 GB UFS 3.0, or 256 GB UFS 3.0
- Removable storage: non-expandable
- Battery: Two Li-Po 2000 mAh batteries, totaling 4000 mAh
- Rear camera: 64 MP + 13 MP + 8 MP + 2 MP
- Front camera: 16 MP
- Display: 6.5 in Super AMOLED capacitive touchscreen; 16 million colors; 103.5 cm^{2} (84.9% screen:body); 1080 px × 2400 px, 20:9 ratio (402 ppi density); Gorilla Glass 5; 1000 nits max. brightness; 90 Hz refresh rate; HDR10+; DCI-P3 100%
- Connectivity: 4G, 3G, GSM
- Data inputs: Sensors: Accelerometer; Barometer; Fingerprint scanner (under display, optical); Gyroscope; Proximity sensor; Magnetometer
- Other: Fast battery charging 50 W (SuperVOOC Flash Charge). 100% in 35 min advertised, with 100% in 27 mins in real-world.
- Website: https://www.realme.com/in

The Realme X2 Pro is a smartphone from the Chinese smartphone manufacturer Realme, released in October 2019.

== Specifications ==
The phone measures 161 mm × 75.7 mm × 8.7 mm (6.34 in × 2.98 in × 0.34 in) and weighs 192 grams (7.02 oz). It has an aluminum frame with Gorilla Glass 5 on the front and back. The display is a 6.5-inch Super AMOLED with 1080 by 2400 pixel resolution, 90 Hz refresh rate, and a maximum brightness of 1000 nits. The phone shipped with ColorOS 6.1, based on Android 9.0 ("Pie") but was upgraded to Realme UI 1.0 between March and April 2020. It contains a Qualcomm Snapdragon 855+ system on a chip, and an Adreno 640 GPU.

The phone has a rear-facing quad-camera array, with one 64 MP f/1.8 wide-angle lens (26 mm full-frame focal length equivalent), one 13 MP f/2.5 telephoto lens (52 mm equivalent), one 8 MP f/2.2 ultra-wide-angle lens (16 mm equivalent), and one 2 MP f/2.4 depth sensor. The three higher-resolution cameras are equipped with phase-detection autofocus. It also has a front-facing 16 MP f/2.0 wide-angle lens (25 mm equivalent).

The phone was sold in 3 variations: 6 GB RAM and 64 GB storage, 8 GB RAM and 128 GB storage and 12 GB RAM and 256 GB storage. The 6 GB/64 GB configuration was only available in the Indian market.

== Reception ==
The phone received mostly positive reviews from critics. TechRadar gave it a score of 4.5/5, praising the phone's battery, speakers, and display with a 90 Hz refresh rate, while criticizing the software, image quality, and in-built gestures. The Verge described the phone as Realme's first phone with high-end specs. Android Authority gave it a review of 9.3/10, praising its display, internals, charging-speed, and camera setup, while criticizing the color OS and low-light camera performance. It also described the X2 Pro as having flagship specs.

== Controversy ==
The smartphone's original operating system, ColorOS 6.1, allowed the unlocking of the phone's bootloader, allowing support for custom Android ROMs such as Lineage OS. When the phone upgraded to realme UI 1.0, in the first weeks any users with locked bootloader could no longer unlock, but soon Realme released an official method to unlock the bootloader.
