= Lifan 530 =

Chinese subcompact sedan

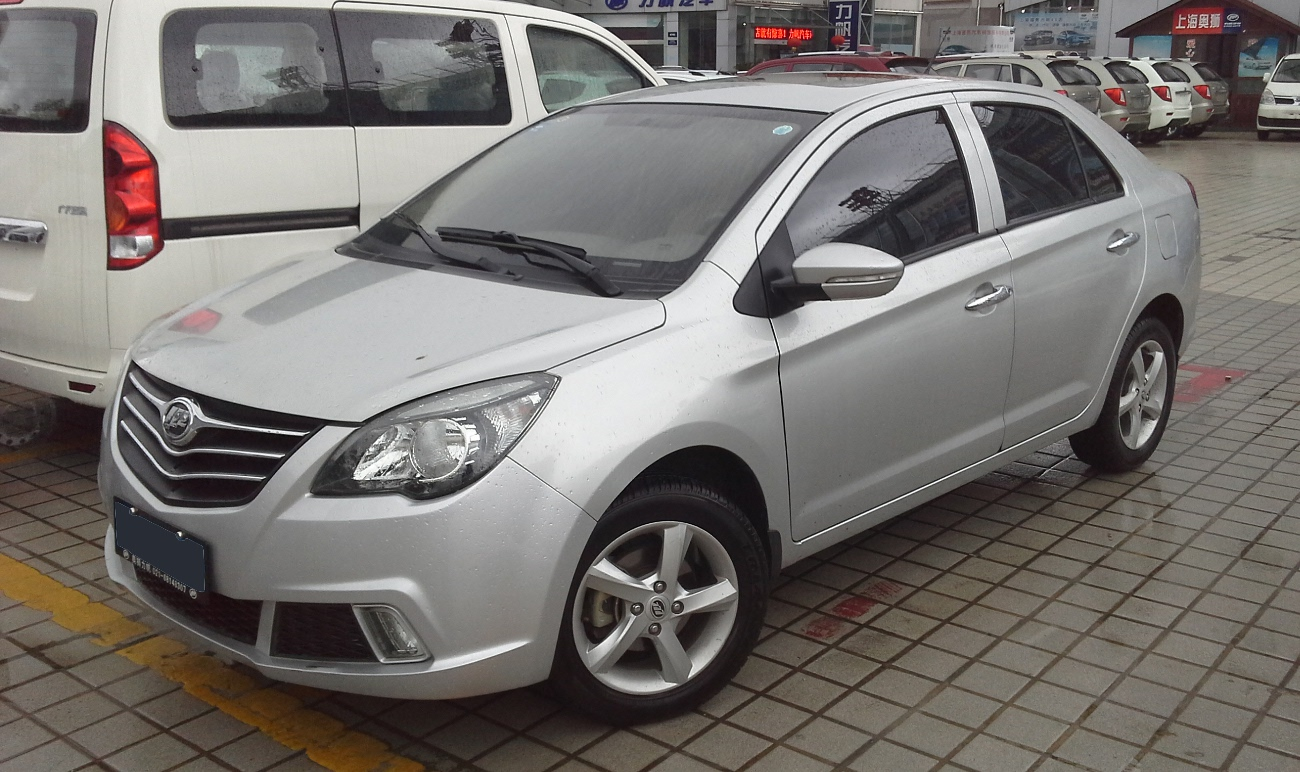
- Lifan 530

Overview
- Manufacturer: Lifan
- Also called: Lifan 520 (during development); Lifan Celliya (Russia); Kantanka Amoanimaa (Ghana)
- Production: 2013–2018
- Assembly: China: Chongqing

Body and chassis
- Class: subcompact
- Body style: 4-door sedan
- Layout: Front-engine, front-wheel-drive

Powertrain
- Engine: 1.5 L I4 (petrol)
- Transmission: 5-speed manual CVT

Dimensions
- Wheelbase: 2,550 mm (100.4 in)
- Length: 4,300 mm (169.3 in)
- Width: 1,690 mm (66.5 in)
- Height: 1,490 mm (58.7 in)

Chronology
- Predecessor: Lifan 520

The Lifan 530 is a four-door subcompact sedan produced by the Chinese manufacturer Lifan.

== Overview ==
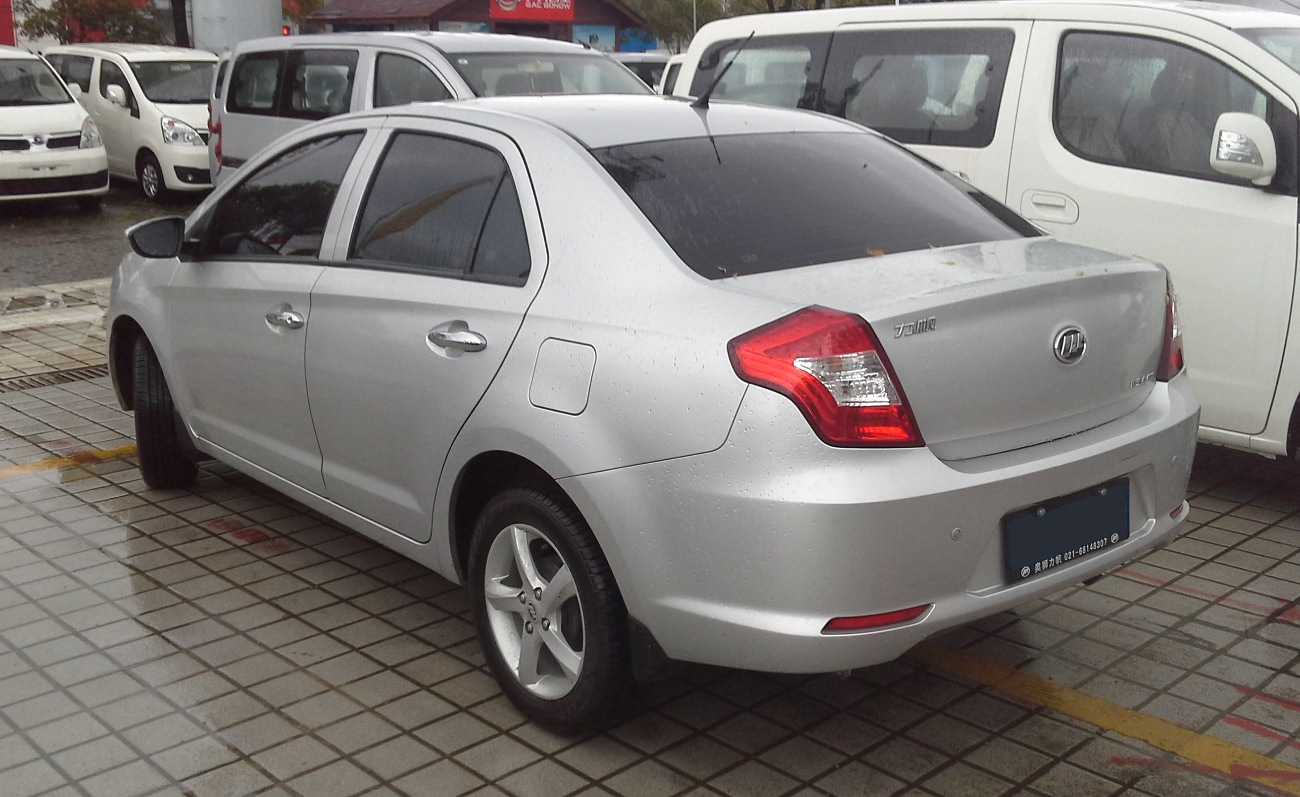
Lifan 530 rear

The Lifan 530 subcompact car debuted as a concept called the Lifan 520 at the 2011 Guangzhou Auto Show in November 2011. Later the Lifan 530 subcompact car was launched on the 2013 Shanghai Auto Show and was available to the China car market in October 2013.

The design of the Lifan 530 subcompact car was clearly inspired by the Toyota Vios XP90, as the dimensions are similar and the side profile is exactly the same.

== Engine and transmission ==
The lone engine during debut was Lifan's 1.5 liter petrol engine producing 76 kW (102 hp) and 110 N⋅m (81 lb⋅ft) of torque, and the gear box is a 5-speed manual gear box. The 1.5 liter petrol engine producing 76 kW (102 hp) was added at market launch in 2013 as well as a CVT. Price range of the Lifan 530 at launch starts at 51,800 yuan and ends at 69,800 yuan.
