= ARM Cortex-A510 =

ARM microprocessor 'LITTLE' core model

General information
- Launched: 2021
- Designed by: ARM Ltd.

Cache
- L1 cache: 64/128 KiB (32/64 KiB I-cache with parity, 32/64 KiB D-cache) per core
- L2 cache: 0–512 KiB per complex
- L3 cache: 128 KiB – 16 MiB (optional)

Architecture and classification
- Microarchitecture: ARM Cortex-A510
- Instruction set: ARMv9-A

Products, models, variants
- Product code name: Klein
- Variant: ARM Cortex-A710

History
- Predecessor: ARM Cortex-A55
- Successor: ARM Cortex-A520

The Cortex-A510 is a CPU microarchitecture designed by Arm Holdings and sold as a semiconductor intellectual property core (IP core). It is a 64-bit design of the ARM architecture family and supports the Aarch64 instruction set architecture (ISA). The A510 is the successor to the ARM Cortex-A55 and the first ARMv9 high efficiency "LITTLE" CPU. It is the companion to the ARM Cortex-A710 "big" core. It is a clean-sheet 64-bit CPU designed by ARM Holdings' Cambridge design team.

== Design ==
The Cortex-A510 is a “LITTLE” CPU core focusing on high efficiency, bringing the following improvements from last gen:

- 3-wide in-order design, the Cortex-A55 was 2-wide.
- 3-wide fetch and decode front-end as well as 3-wide issue and execute on the back-end, which includes 3 ALU's.
- 35% performance uplift compared to Cortex-A55
- 20% more energy efficient than Cortex-A55
- 3x ML uplift

ARM announced a refresh for the Cortex-A510 CPU core on 28 June 2022 along with other CPU cores.

The refresh improved power efficiency by 5% and scalability from 8 cores to up to 12 cores. Additionally, the refresh could be configured with 32-bit support, whereas the original was 64-bit only.

== Architecture comparison ==
"LITTLE" core

uArch	Cortex-A53	Cortex-A55	Cortex-A510	Cortex-A520
Codename	Apollo	Ananke	Klein	Hayes
Peak clock speed	2.3 GHz	2.1 GHz	2.0 GHz	2.0 GHz
Architecture	ARMv8.0-A	ARMv8.2-A	ARMv9.0-A	ARMv9.2-A
AArch	32-bit and 64-bit			64-bit
Branch predictor history (entries)	3072	-		
Max In-flight	None (In-order)			
L0 (Mops entries)	None			
L1-I + L1-D	8/64+8/64 KiB	16/64+16/64 KiB	32/64+32/64 KiB	
L2	0–256 KiB		0–512 KiB	
L3	None	0–4 MiB	0–16 MiB	0–32 MiB
Decode Width	2		3	3 (2 ALU)
Dispatch	8			

== Usage ==
The Cortex-A510 CPU core is used in the following SoCs

- Qualcomm • Snapdragon 8 gen 1 • Snapdragon 8+ gen 1 • Snapdragon 8 gen 2 • Snapdragon 7 gen 1 • Snapdragon 7+ gen 2
- MediaTek • Dimensity 9200+ • Dimensity 9200 • Dimensity 9000+ • Dimensity 9000 • Dimensity 8300 • Dimensity 7200
- Samsung • Exynos 2200
- HiSilicon • Kirin 9000S
- Google • Tensor G3
