= I.MX =

Family of microcontrollers

The i.MX series is a family of ARM architecture-based system-on-chip (SoC) processors designed by NXP Semiconductors for multimedia and embedded applications focused on low-power consumption. Originally developed by Freescale Semiconductor (acquired by NXP in 2015), the i.MX application processors integrate multiple processing units including CPU cores, graphics processing units (GPUs), and video processing units (VPUs) onto a single die. The i.MX family is qualified for automotive, industrial, and consumer markets with most products guaranteed for a production lifetime of 10 to 15 years.

i.MX originally stood for "innovative Multimedia eXtension" and was previously known as the "DragonBall MX" family, the fifth generation of Freescale DragonBall microcontrollers. Notable devices that use i.MX processors include Ford Sync automotive systems, the Amazon Kindle, Zune (except for Zune HD), Purism's Librem 5, and various embedded systems and single-board computers.

== History ==
The i.MX family was launched in 2001/2002 with the original DragonBall MX1 series based on ARM920T architecture. Freescale Semiconductor developed successive generations through the 2000s and 2010s, progressively adopting newer ARM architectures from ARM9 through ARM11 to ARM Cortex designs. In 2007, Freescale licensed AMD's Imageon graphics technology to integrate GPU capabilities into later i.MX5 series processors. NXP acquired Freescale in 2015 in a deal worth nearly $12 billion, with the i.MX product line continuing development under NXP.

The i.MX family has expanded significantly over time with newer generations incorporating more advanced ARM cores, improved manufacturing processes, and specialized variants for IoT, automotive, and industrial applications. The i.MX RT crossover microcontroller series was introduced in 2017, combining microcontroller-like features with applications processor performance.

== i.MX 1 series ==
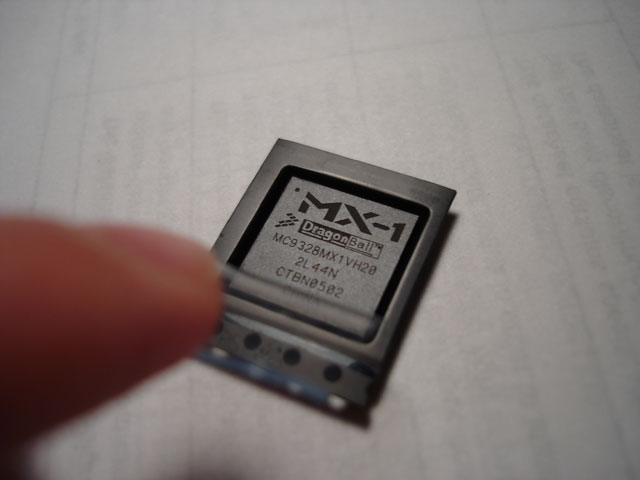
Freescale DragonBall MX-1 Microprocessor (BGA Package). The series was later renamed to i.MX.

Launched in 2001/2002, the i.MX / MX-1 series is based on the ARM920T architecture.

- i.MX1 = 200 MHz ARM920T
- i.MXS = 100 MHz ARM920T
- i.MXL = 150-200 MHz ARM920T

== i.MX 2 series ==
The i.MX2x series is a family of processors based on the ARM9 architecture (ARM926EJ-S), designed in a 90 nm process.

=== i.MX 21 family ===
The i.MX21 family is designed for low power handheld devices. It was launched in 2003.

- i.MX21 = 266 MHz ARM9 platform + CIF VPU (decode/encode) + security
- i.MX21S = 266 MHz ARM9 platform + security

=== i.MX 27 family ===
The i.MX27 family is designed for videotelephony and video surveillance. It was launched in 2007.

- i.MX27 = 400 MHz ARM9 platform + D1 VPU (decode/encode) + IPU + security
- i.MX27L = 400 MHz ARM9 platform + IPU + security

=== i.MX 25 family ===
The i.MX25 family was launched in 2009. It especially integrates key security features in hardware. The high-end member of the family, i.MX258, integrates a 400 MHz ARM9 CPU platform + LCDC (LCD controller) + security block and supports mDDR-SDRAM at 133 MHz.

- i.MX258 (industrial) = 400 MHz ARM9 platform + LCDC (with touch screen support) + security
- i.MX257 (consumer/industrial) = 400 MHz ARM9 platform + LCDC (with touch screen support)
- i.MX253 (consumer/industrial) = 400 MHz ARM9 platform + LCDC + security (no touch)
- i.MX255 (automotive) = 400 MHz ARM9 platform + LCDC (with touch screen support) + security
- i.MX251 (automotive) = 400 MHz ARM9 platform + security

=== i.MX 23 family ===
The i.MX233 processor (formerly known as SigmaTel STMP3780 of the STMP37xx family), launched in 2009, integrates a Power Management Unit (PMU) and a stereo audio codec within the silicon, thus removing the need for external power management chip and audio codec chip.

- i.MX233 (consumer) = 454 MHz ARM9 platform + LCD Controller (with touch screen support) + Pixel Pipeline + security + Power Management Unit + audio codec. Provided in 128LQFP or 169 BGA packages.

=== i.MX 28 family ===
The i.MX28 family was launched in 2010. It integrates key security features in hardware, an ADC, and the power management unit. It supports mDDR, LV-DDR2, and DDR2-SDRAM memory at 200 MHz.

- i.MX287 (industrial) = 454 MHz ARM9 platform + LCDC (with touch screen support) + security + power management + dual CAN interface + dual Ethernet + L2 Switch
- i.MX286 (industrial) = 454 MHz ARM9 platform + LCDC (with touch screen support) + security + power management + dual CAN interface + single Ethernet
- i.MX285 (automotive) = 454 MHz ARM9 platform + LCDC (with touch screen support) + security + power management + dual CAN interface
- i.MX283 (consumer/industrial) = 454 MHz ARM9 platform + LCDC (with touch screen support) + security + power management + single Ethernet
- i.MX281 (automotive) = 454 MHz ARM9 platform + security + power management + dual CAN interface + single Ethernet
- i.MX280 (consumer/industrial) = 454 MHz ARM9 platform + security + power management + single Ethernet

== i.MX 3 series ==
The i.MX3x series is a family of processors based on the ARM11 architecture (ARM1136J(F)-S mainly), designed in a 90 nm process.

=== i.MX 31 family ===
The i.MX31 was launched in 2005. It integrates a 532 MHz ARM1136JF-S CPU platform (with vector floating point unit, L1 caches and 128KB L2 caches) + Video Processing Unit (VPU) + 3D GPU (OpenGL ES 1.1) + IPU + security block. It supports mDDR-SDRAM at 133 MHz. The 3D and VPU acceleration is provided by the PowerVR MBX Lite.

- i.MX31 (consumer/industrial/automotive) = 532 MHz ARM1136 platform + VPU + 3D GPU + IPU + security
- i.MX31L (consumer/industrial/automotive) = 532 MHz ARM1136 platform + VPU + IPU + security

=== i.MX 37 family ===
The i.MX37 processor is designed for portable media players. It was launched in 2008.

- i.MX 37 (consumer) = 532 MHz ARM1176 CPU platform + D1 VPU (multiformat D1 decode) + IPU + security block

It supports mDDR-SDRAM at 133 MHz.

=== i.MX 35 family ===
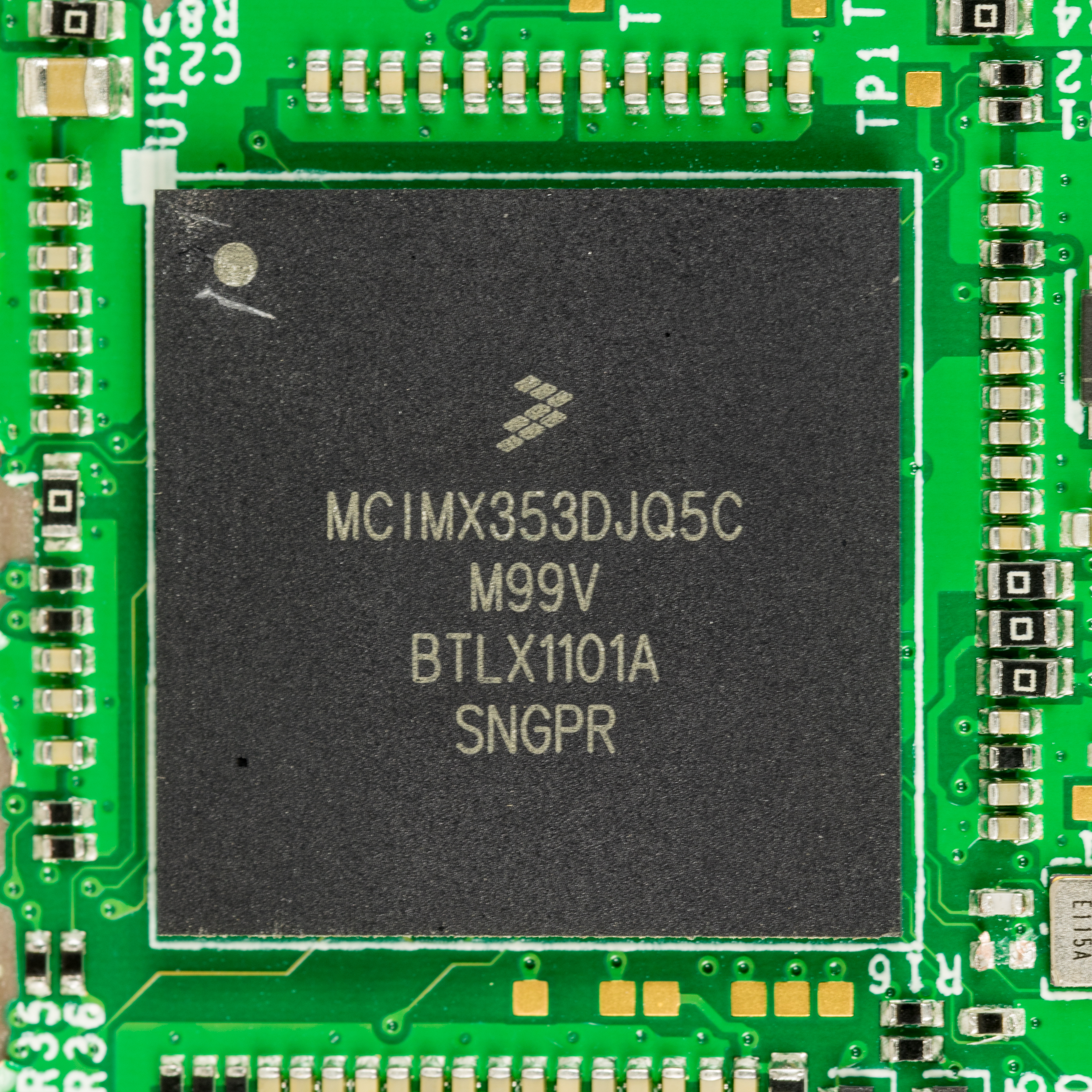
Freescale Semiconductor MCIMX353DJQ5C

The i.MX35 family was launched in 2009 and is the replacement for the i.MX31 series. The high-end member of the family, i.MX357, integrates a 532 MHz ARM1136J(F)-S CPU platform (with Vector Floating Point unit, L1 caches and 128KB L2 cache), a 2.5D GPU (OpenVG 1.1), a IPU, and a security block. It supports DDR2-SDRAM at 133 MHz.

- i.MX357 (consumer/industrial) = 532 MHz ARM1136J(F)-S CPU platform + 2.5D GPU + IPU + security
- i.MX353 (consumer/industrial) = 532 MHz ARM1136J(F)-S CPU platform + IPU + security
- i.MX356 (automotive) = 532 MHz ARM1136J(F)-S CPU platform + 2.5D GPU + IPU + security
- i.MX355 (automotive) = 532 MHz ARM1136J(F)-S CPU platform + IPU + security
- i.MX351 (automotive) = i.MX355 with no LCD interface

== i.MX 5 series ==
The i.MX5x series is based on the ARM Cortex A8 core. It consists of two families: the i.MX51 family (high-end multimedia devices like smartbook or automotive infotainment) and the i.MX50 family (eReaders). It is designed in a 65 nm process. Freescale licensed ATI's Imageon technology in 2007, and some i.MX5 models include an Imageon Z460 GPU.

=== i.MX 51 family ===
The high-end member of the family, i.MX515, integrates an 800 MHz ARM Cortex A8 CPU platform (with NEON co-processor, Vector Floating Point Unit, L1 caches and 256KB L2 cache) + multi-format HD 720p decode / D1 encode hardware video codecs (VPU, Video Processing Unit) + Imageon Z430 3D GPU (OpenGL ES 2.0) + 2.5D GPU (OpenVG 1.1) + IPU + security block. It especially supports DDR2 SDRAM at 200 MHz. The imx51 family was launched in 2009.

- i.MX515 (consumer/industrial) = 800 MHz ARM Cortex A8 platform (600 MHz for industrial) + HD VPU + 3D GPU + 2.5D GPU + IPU + security
- i.MX513 (consumer/industrial) = 800 MHz ARM Cortex A8 platform (600 MHz for industrial) + HD VPU + IPU
- i.MX512 (consumer/industrial) = 800 MHz ARM Cortex A8 platform (600 MHz for industrial) + IPU
- i.MX516 (automotive) = 600 MHz ARM Cortex A8 platform + HD VPU + 3D GPU + 2.5D GPU + IPU + security block
- i.MX514 (automotive) = 600 MHz ARM Cortex A8 platform + 3D GPU + 2.5D GPU + IPU + security block

=== i.MX 50 family ===
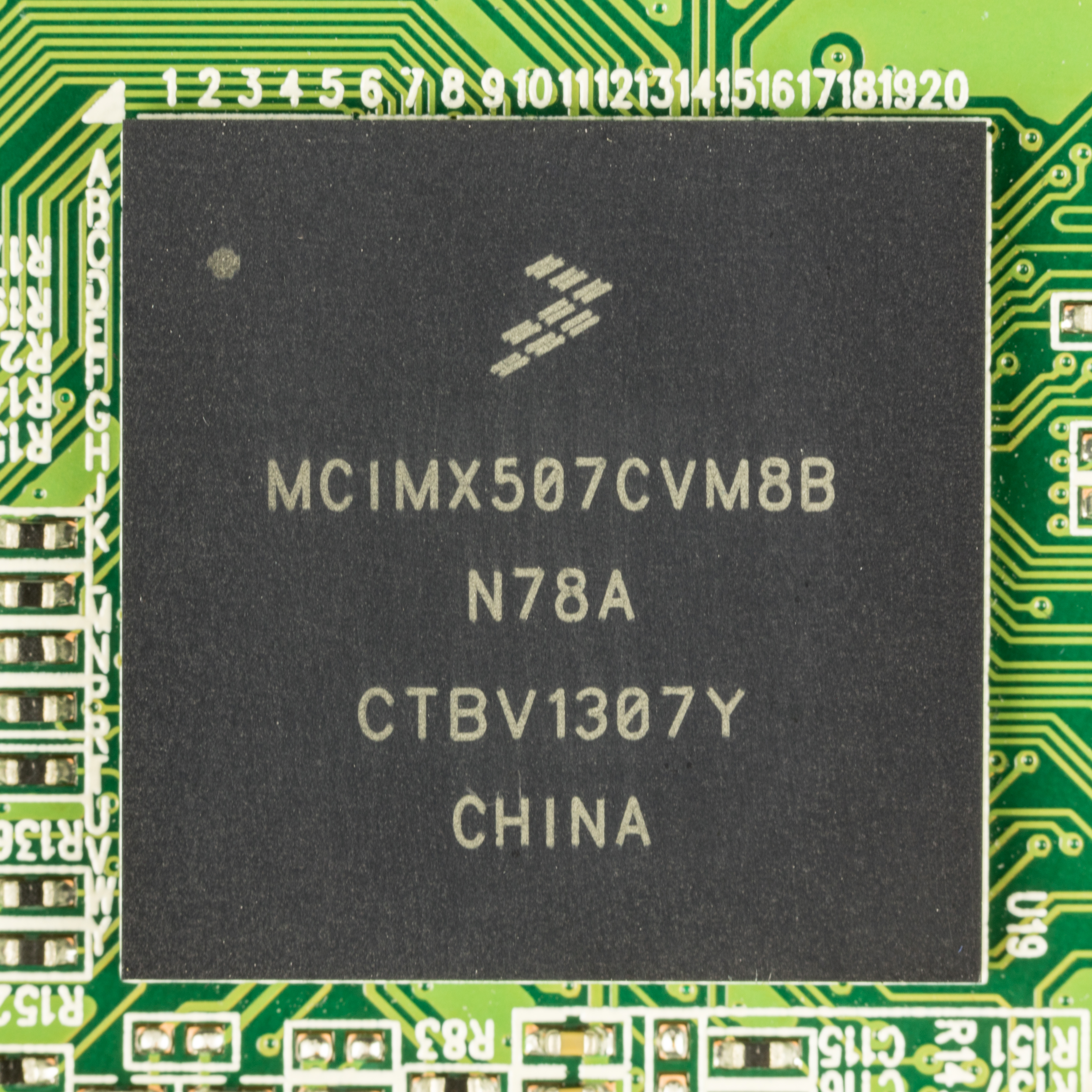
Freescale MCIMX507CVM8B

The i.MX508 processor is the result of Freescale collaboration with E Ink. It is dedicated for eReaders. Launched in 2010, it integrates the E Ink display controller within the silicon to save both BOM cost and space on the PCB. It especially supports LP-DDR2 SDRAM at 400 MHz.

- i.MX507 (consumer) = ARM Cortex A8 platform + E Ink display controller. Builds on the i.MX508.
- i.MX508 (consumer) = 800 MHz ARM Cortex A8 platform + 2.5D GPU + Pixel Pipeline + E Ink display controller.

=== i.MX 53 family ===
i.MX535 was announced in June 2010. Shipped since the first quarter of 2011.

- i.MX537 (industrial) = 800 MHz ARM Cortex A8 platform + Full HD VPU (1080p decode) + 3D GPU + 2.5D GPU + IPU + security + IEEE1588
- i.MX535 (consumer) = 1 GHz ARM Cortex A8 platform + Full HD VPU (1080p decode) + 3D GPU + 2.5D GPU + IPU + security
- i.MX536 (automotive) = 800 MHz ARM Cortex A8 platform + Full HD VPU (1080p decode) + 3D GPU + 2.5D GPU + IPU + security
- i.MX534 (automotive) = 800 MHz ARM Cortex A8 platform + 3D GPU + 2.5D GPU + IPU + security

== i.MX 6 series ==
The i.MX 6 series are based on the ARM Cortex A9 solo, dual or quad cores (in some cases Cortex A7) and typically comes with one or more Vivante GPUs. It is designed in the 40 nm process. i.MX 6 Solo, Dual and Quad were announced in January 2011, during Consumer Electronics Show in Las Vegas.

Name	Clock speed	CPU cores	L2 cache in kB	Embedded SRAM in kB	3D GPU / shaders / shader clock in MHz	2D GPU	Vector GPU	VPU	other graphics cores	other cores
i.MX 6 ULL	528 MHz (Cortex-A7)	1	128	128					1× PXP	security
i.MX 6 UltraLite	528/696 MHz (Cortex-A7)	1	128	128					1× PXP	security
i.MX 6 SLL	800 MHz/1.0 GHz	1	256	128					1× PXP	security
i.MX 6 SoloLite	1.0 GHz	1	256	128		Vivante GC320	Vivante GC355		1× PXP	security
i.MX 6 SoloX	1.0 GHz	1	256	128	Vivante GC400T / 1 / 720	Vivante GC320	Vivante GC355		1× PXP	Cortex-M4 core, security
i.MX 6 Solo	1.0 GHz	1	512	128	Vivante GC880 / 1 / 528	Vivante GC320		Full HD (1080p decode)	1× IPUv3, 1× PXP	security
i.MX 6 DualLite	1.0 GHz	2	512	128	Vivante GC880 / 1 / 528	Vivante GC320		Full HD (1080p decode)	1× IPUv3, 1× PXP	security
i.MX 6 Dual	1.2 GHz	2	1024	256	Vivante GC2000 / 4 / 594	Vivante GC320	Vivante GC355	Full HD (1080p decode)	2× IPUv3	security
i.MX 6 Quad	1.2 GHz	4	1024	256	Vivante GC2000 / 4 / 594	Vivante GC320	Vivante GC355	dual Full HD (1080p decode)	2× IPUv3	security
i.MX 6 DualPlus	1.0 (1.2) GHz	2	1024	512	Vivante GC3000 / 4 / 720	Vivante GC320	Vivante GC355	Full HD (1080p decode)	2× IPUv3	security
i.MX 6 QuadPlus	1.0 (1.2) GHz	4	1024	512	Vivante GC3000 / 4 / 720	Vivante GC320	Vivante GC355	dual Full HD (1080p decode)	2× IPUv3	security

- "Plus" versions with 1.2 GHz are currently only available via special request to NXP.
- Vivante GC2000 achieves ~19 GFLOPS for a 594 MHz shader clock and ~23 GFLOPS for a 720 MHz shader clock.

== i.MX 7 series ==
The i.MX 7 series is based on the low-power ARM Cortex A7 CPU core with a secondary ARM Cortex M4 real-time co-processor. It is designed 28 nm fully depleted silicon on insulator (FDSOI) process. Only low-powered single and dual-core models, designed for IoT applications, have been released. i.MX 7Solo and i.MX 7Dual were announced in September 2013.

Name	Clock speed (MHz)	CPU cores	L2 cache (KB)	3D GPU	2D GPU	Vector GPU	VPU	other graphics cores	other cores
i.MX 7Solo	800	1	512	-	-	-	-	PXP	Secondary CPU – ARM Cortex M4 real-time co-processor
i.MX 7Dual	1000	2	512	-	-	-	-	PXP	Secondary CPU – ARM Cortex M4 real-time co-processor

== i.MX 8 series ==
There are four major different series of the i.MX 8:

- i.MX 8 series
- i.MX 8M series,
- i.MX 8ULP series,
- i.MX 8X series.

Each series differs significantly from each other and are not pin compatible. Within each series some versions are pin compatible.

Each series also has a suffix such as Quad, Dual, Plus, Max or a combination thereof, for example: QuadMax or DualPlus. The i.MX 8 series has many variants but it is not clear how the name corresponds to a feature set. In previous CPU series the naming convention clearly corresponds to a function or feature set, but this is not the case with i.MX 8.

The i.MX 8 series was announced in September 2013 and is based on the ARMv8-A 64-bit CPU architecture. According to NXP, the i.MX 8 series is designed for Driver Information Systems (car computers) and applications have been released.

In May 2016 the i.MX 8 became available as a multisensory enablement kit (MEK) based on i.MX 8. Slides from NXP FTF found on the web indicated an initial total of 5 variants (with a main level of categorization into "Dual" and "Quad") with varying the CPU and GPU capabilities. The CPU was suggested to include varying counts of Cortex-A72, Cortex-A53 and Cortex-M4, while the GPU is either 1 or 2 units of the Vivante GC7000VX. Other publications supported this general image, some even including photos of an evaluation kit that is named "Multisensory Enablement Kit" (MEK) that got later promoted as a development support product by NXP.

The i.MX 8 was announced Q1 2017, based around 3 products. Two variants include four Cortex-A53. All versions includes one or two Cortex-A72 CPU cores and all versions includes two Cortex-M4F CPU cores.

All i.MX 8 SoCs include Vivante GC7000 Series GPUs. The QuadPlus is using GC7000Lite cores, while the 'QuadMax' includes two full GC7000 GPUs.

Name	Clock speed (MHz)	CPU cores	L2 cache	GPU	VPU	Other cores
i.MX 8 QuadMax	1.2 GHz + 1.6 GHz	4× Cortex-A53 + 2× Cortex-A72	2× 1 MB	2× Vivante GC7000/XSVX	H.265 decode 4K/2K, H.264 encode/decode 1080p	2× Cortex-M4F (266 MHz)
i.MX 8 QuadPlus	1.2 GHz + 1.6 GHz	4× Cortex-A53 + 1× Cortex-A72	2× 1 MB	2× Vivante GC7000Lite/XSVX	H.265 decode 4K/2K, H.264 encode/decode 1080p	2× Cortex-M4F (266 MHz)
i.MX 8 DualMax	1.6 GHz	2× Cortex-A72	1 MB	1× Vivante GC7000/XSVX	H.265 decode 4K/2K, H.264 encode/decode 1080p	2× Cortex-M4F (266 MHz)

Standard Key Features: Advanced Security, Ethernet with AVB, USB 3.0 with PHY, MMC/SDIO, UART, SPI, I²C, I²S, Timers, Secure RTC, Media Processor Engine (Neon™), Integrated Power Management.

	CPU, GPU and DSP							HMI & Multimedia				GPU Libraries and Extensions				Interfaces		Memory Types			
Product Family	Cortex-A72	Cortex-A53	Cortex-A35	Cortex-M4F	Cortex-M33	DSP	GPU	Display Resolution and Interfaces: MIPI-DSI / Parallel / HDMI	Camera Interfaces: MIPI-CSI / Parallel / HDMI	Video Decode Resolution (Top Codecs)	Video Encode Resolution (Top Codecs)	OpenVX (vision)	OpenGL ES	OpenCL	Vulkan	PCIe	Gigabit Ethernet	LPDDR4	DDR4	DDR3L	ECC option
i.MX 8 Advanced Graphics, Performance and Virtualization	2	4		2		1	2	4k + 1080p 2 / 1 / 1	2 / 2 / 1	4K (h.265, h.264)	1080p60 (h.264)	Yes	3.1	2.0	Yes	2	2x	Yes	Yes		
i.MX 8M Advanced Audio, Voice and Video		4		1			1	4k + 1080p 1 / 0 / 1	2 / 0 / 0	4Kp60 with High Dynamic Range (h.265, VP9); 4Kp30 (h.264, VP8)	1080p30 (h.264) - SW		3.1	1.2	Yes	2	1x	Yes	Yes	Yes	
i.MX 8M Mini Embedded Consumer and Industrial Applications		4		1			1	1080p 1 / 0 / 0	1 / 0 / 0	1080p60 (h.265, VP9, h.264, VP8)	1080p60 (h.264)		2.0			1	1x	Yes	Yes	Yes	
*i.MX 8ULP Industrial, Mobile and Smart Home Applications			2		1	1	2	1 / 1 / 0	1 / 1 / 0				3.1	Yes	Yes	0	0x	Yes			
*i.MX 8ULP-CS Cloud Secured for IoT and Industrial Applications			1		1	1	1	1 / 1 / 0	1 / 1 / 0						No	0	0x	Yes			
i.MX 8X Safety certifiable and efficient performance			4	1		1	1	4K or 2x 1080p 2 / 1 / 0	1 / 1 / 0	4K (h.265); 1080p60 (h.264, VP8)	1080p30 (h.264)		3.1	1.2 EP	Yes	1	2x	Yes		Yes	Yes

*pre-production

=== i.MX 8 ===
Feature	ARM core			DSP	GPU	PCIe 3.0
i.MX 8 QuadMax	2× Cortex-A72	4× Cortex-A53	2× Cortex-M4F	HiFi 4 DSP	2 x GC7000XSVX	1x (2-lane)
i.MX 8 QuadPlus	1× Cortex-A72	4× Cortex-A53	2× Cortex-M4F	HiFi 4 DSP	2 x GC7000Lite/XSVX	1x (1-lane)

=== i.MX 8M ===
The i.MX 8M series were announced on January 4 at CES 2017. Main features:

- Up to four 1.5 GHz ARM Cortex-A53 processors
- Cortex-M4F for real-time processing
- LPDDR4, DDR4 and DDR3(L) memory support
- Two USB 3.0 interfaces with PHY and Type-C support
- Two PCIe interfaces (1-lane each) with L1 substates for fast wakeup and low power
- HDMI 2.0a and MIPI-DSI (4-lane) display interfaces • Up to two MIPI-CSI2 (4-lane) camera interfaces
- Gigabit Ethernet MAC with Audio Video Bridging (AVB) and EEE capability
- 4K UltraHD resolution and 10-bit High Dynamic Range (HDR) in H.264, H.265 and VP9 support
- Up to 4Kp60 resolution on the HDMI 2.0a output and 1080p60 resolution on the MIPI-DSI (4-lanes) interface
- OpenGL ES 3.1, OpenCL 1.2, OpenGL 3.0, OpenVG and Vulkan support

Feature	ARM core	ARM core	Audio	GPU	VPU	Camera
i.MX 8M Dual	2× 1.5 GHz Cortex-A53	1× Cortex-M4F	20 channels in/out; 32-bit up to 384 kHz, with DSD512 support	GC7000Lite	4Kp60, H.265 and VP9	2× MIPI-CSI
i.MX 8M Quad	4× 1.5 GHz Cortex-A53	1× Cortex-M4F	20 channels in/out; 32-bit up to 384 kHz, with DSD512 support	GC7000Lite	4Kp60, H.265 and VP9	2× MIPI-CSI
i.MX 8M QuadLite	4× 1.5 GHz Cortex-A53	1× Cortex-M4F	20 channels in/out; 32-bit up to 384 kHz, with DSD512 support	GC7000Lite	-	2× MIPI-CSI
i.MX 8M Solo	1× 1.5 GHz Cortex-A53	1× Cortex-M4F	20 channels in/out; 32-bit up to 384 kHz, with DSD512 support	GC7000nanoULTRA	-	-

=== i.MX 8M Mini ===
The i.MX 8M Mini is NXP's first embedded multi-core heterogeneous applications processors built using 14LPC FinFET process technology.

At the heart is a scalable core complex of up to four Arm Cortex-A53 cores running up to 2 GHz plus Cortex-M4 based real-time processing domain at 400+MHz. i.MX 8M Mini core options are used for consumer, audio, industrial, machine learning training and inferencing across a range of cloud providers.

Features

- Heterogeneous Multi-core Processing Architecture
- Quad-core Arm Cortex-A53 core up to 2 GHz
- Cortex-M4 at speeds of 400+MHz
- 1080p video encode and decode
- 2D and 3D graphics
- Display and camera interfaces
- Multi-channel audio and digital microphone inputs
- Connectivity (I2C, SAI, UART, SPI, SDIO, USB, PCIe, Gigabit Ethernet)
- Low-power and standard DDR memory support
- Multiple pin-compatible product offerings
- Consumer and Industrial

Feature	ARM core	ARM core	DRAM	Audio	GPU	Video Decode	Video Encode	Display	Camera	USB with PHY
i.MX 8M Mini	1×, 2× or 4× Cortex-A53	1× Cortex-M4F	32-bit LPDDR4/DDR4/DDR3(L)	20x I^{2}S 32-bit up to 384 kHz with DSD512 and TDM support 8-ch PDM microphone inputs	3D: GCNanoUltra 2D: GC320	1080p60 H.265, H.264, VP8, VP9	1080p60 H.264, VP8	1x MIPI-DSI	1x MIPI-CSI	1x PCIe 2.0 3x SDIO/eMMC 2x USB 2.0 1x GbE
i.MX 8M Mini Lite	1×, 2× or 4× Cortex-A53	1× Cortex-M4F	32-bit LPDDR4/DDR4/DDR3(L)	20x I^{2}S 32-bit up to 384 kHz with DSD512 and TDM support 8-ch PDM microphone inputs	3D: GCNanoUltra 2D: GC320	-	-	1x MIPI-DSI	1x MIPI-CSI	1x PCIe 2.0 3x SDIO/eMMC 2x USB 2.0 1x GbE

=== i.MX 8X ===
The i.MX 8X series were announced on March 14, 2017. Main features:

- Up to four 1.2 GHz Cortex-A35 processors
- Cortex-M4F for real-time processing
- Latest cryptography standards (AES, flashless SHE, elliptical curve cryptography, key storage)
- ECC memory
- Tensilica HiFi 4 DSP for audio pre- and post- processing, key word detection and speech recognition
- 28 nm FD-SOI process

Feature	ARM core	ARM core	DSP Core	DRAM		GPU	VPU	Ethernet	USB with PHY
i.MX 8 QuadXPlus	4× 1.2 GHz Cortex-A35	1× Cortex-M4F	Tensilica HiFi 4 DSP	32-bit	DDR3L (ECC option) LPDDR4 (no ECC)	GC7000Lite	4K H.265 dec 1080p H.264 enc/dec	2× gigabit with AVB	1× USB 3.0 1× USB 2.0
i.MX 8 DualXPlus	2× 1.2 GHz Cortex-A35	1× Cortex-M4F	Tensilica HiFi 4 DSP	32-bit	DDR3L (ECC option) LPDDR4 (no ECC)	GC7000Lite	4K H.265 dec 1080p H.264 enc/dec	2× gigabit with AVB	1× USB 3.0 1× USB 2.0
i.MX 8 DualX	2× 1.2 GHz Cortex-A35	1× Cortex-M4F	Tensilica HiFi 4 DSP	16-bit	DDR3L (ECC option) LPDDR4 (no ECC)	GC7000UltraLite	1080p H.264 enc/dec	1× gigabit with AVB 1× 10/100	2× USB 2.0

== i.MX 9 series ==
The i.MX 9 series represents NXP's latest generation of application processors, built on advanced manufacturing processes and featuring ARM Cortex-A55 cores. The series was developed to address growing demands for edge computing, real-time connectivity, and AI/ML capabilities in industrial, automotive, and IoT applications. The i.MX 9 family includes multiple variants (i.MX 91, i.MX 93, i.MX 94, i.MX 95) targeting different market segments and performance requirements.

Main features:

- ARM Cortex-A55 cores (1 to 6 cores depending on variant)
- ARM Cortex-M33 or Cortex-M7 co-processors for real-time processing
- Neural Processing Unit (NPU) on select variants for AI/ML acceleration
- Time-Sensitive Networking (TSN) support for industrial and automotive applications
- Post-quantum cryptography (PQC) on i.MX 94 for quantum-resistant security
- Advanced display support (up to 4K30p on i.MX 95)
- LPDDR4/LPDDR4X memory with ECC support
- PCIe Gen 3.0, USB 2.0/3.0, Gigabit/10 Gigabit Ethernet connectivity
- Multiple CAN-FD interfaces for automotive and industrial applications
- Hardware security features including secure boot and memory encryption

	CPU and other processors							HMI & Multimedia		Interfaces										Memory Types	
Product Family	Cortex-A55	Cortex-M33	Cortex-M7	DSP	NPU	GPU	ISP	Display Resolution and Interfaces	Camera Resolution and Interfaces	PCIe	USB 2.0	USB 3.0	Ethernet	External Memory	CAN-FD	UART	Flex - IO	Audio	Others	LPDDR4 (with ECC)	LPDDR4X (with ECC)
i.MX 91	1							24 bit-per-pixel parallel RGB/YUV Display	8-bit parallel RGB/YUV Camera		2x USB 2.0 (Dual mode, w/Type C)		2x 1GbE (1 w/TSN)	3x SD/SDIO3.0/eMMC5.1, 1x Octal SPI	2	8	2x 32-pin	3 SAI (1 2-lane, 2-1 lane)/ 4x I2S TDM (32-bit @ 384 kHz) 8 channel PDM microphone input + Medium Quality Sound output, SPDIF	1x 4-ch, 12-bit ADC, 8x I2C, 8x SPI, 2x I3C XSPI responder		
i.MX 93ML	2	1			1	2D		1080p60 MIPI DSI (4-lane), 720p60 LVDS (4-lane), 24-bit parallel RGB	1080p60 MIPI CSI (2-lane), 8-bit parallel YUV/RGB		2		2x 1GbE with 1 w/TSN	3x SD/SDIO3.0/eMMC5.1, 1x Octal SPI	2	8	2x 32-bit	7x I2S, SPDIF, PDM mic, MQS output	4-ch 12-bit ADC, 8x I2C, 2x I3C, 8x SPI		
i.MX 95	Up to 6	1	1	Immersiv3D™ Audio Framework	1	3D	1	4K30P, 3840x1440P60 MIPI-DSI (4-lane) Up to 1080P LVDS (2x 4-lane or 1x 8-lane)	2x4kp30, 4x1080p60, 8x1080p30 MIPI-CSI (2x 4-lane)	2 Gen 3.0 (1-lane)	1	1	10 GbE + 2x 1 GbE with 1x TSN	3x SD/SDIO3.0/eMMC5.1, 1x Octal SPI							

== i.MX RT series ==
The i.MX RT series represents a crossover between traditional microcontrollers and application processors, combining the real-time capabilities and deterministic performance of microcontrollers with the higher clock speeds and peripheral sets typically found in applications processors. Unlike traditional microcontrollers that rely on flash memory for program storage, the i.MX RT series uses large amounts of integrated SRAM as the primary program execution space. This architectural choice eliminates wait states associated with flash memory access, enabling the processors to achieve higher sustained performance and more deterministic execution times crucial for real-time applications.

The RT series targets edge computing, industrial automation, IoT devices, and other applications requiring real-time responsiveness combined with higher processing power than conventional microcontrollers can provide. They were introduced at up to 600 MHz on a 40 nm node, which was later upgraded to 1 GHz on a 28 nm node. The inaugural device from this series was the i.MX RT1050, introduced in the fall of 2017.

As of 2025, the family consists of Cortex-M7 devices (400 MHz to 1 GHz) and Cortex-M33 devices (200-325 MHz) targeting different performance and power requirements.

Main features:

- ARM Cortex-M7 cores (400 MHz to 1 GHz) or ARM Cortex-M33 cores (200-325 MHz)
- Zero-wait-state code execution from on-chip SRAM
- Hardware acceleration for graphics, cryptography, and signal processing
- FlexSPI interfaces for external memory (QSPI/Octal SPI flash, SDRAM)
- Advanced connectivity (USB 2.0/3.0, Gigabit Ethernet with TSN/AVB, CAN-FD)
- Security features including secure boot, TrustZone-M, and crypto accelerators
- 2D graphics acceleration and display controllers (MIPI-DSI, parallel RGB, LVDS)
- Audio processing with DSP coprocessors (Cadence Tensilica HiFi 1/4, Fusion F1)
- Neural Processing Unit (NPU) on RT700 series for AI/ML acceleration
- Real-time operating system support (FreeRTOS, Zephyr, Azure RTOS)

The i.MX RT1170 represents the high-performance flagship with dual cores (Cortex-M7 at 1 GHz and Cortex-M4 at 400 MHz) running in separate power domains. It includes two Gigabit Ethernet ports with Time-Sensitive Networking (TSN) support and achieves over 4,500 CoreMark performance. The RT1160 offers similar dual-core architecture with three Ethernet interfaces.

The i.MX RT500 series, introduced in 2021, marked the entry into ultra-low-power crossover MCUs with ARM Cortex-M33 at 275 MHz paired with a Cadence Xtensa Fusion F1 DSP, optimized for wearables and IoT applications with up to 5 MB SRAM. The i.MX RT600 series focuses on audio and voice applications, featuring Cortex-M33 at 300 MHz with a Cadence Tensilica HiFi 4 DSP at 600 MHz. It supports up to 8 digital microphones and includes 4.5 MB SRAM for audio processing workloads.

Announced in September 2024, the i.MX RT700 introduces integrated AI acceleration through an eIQ Neutron NPU. It features up to five cores including dual Cortex-M33 processors (325 MHz and 250 MHz), HiFi 4 and HiFi 1 DSPs, and a RISC-V based I/O coprocessor. The NPU provides up to 100x AI performance acceleration with 30% reduced active power and 70% improved sleep mode efficiency compared to earlier RT series. The RT700 is expected to begin sampling in Q1 2025.

NXP provides development support through MCUXpresso SDK and IDE, with RTOS support for FreeRTOS, Zephyr, and Azure RTOS. The eIQ machine learning environment supports TensorFlow Lite Micro and PyTorch Glow for edge AI applications.

== Software support ==
Freescale proposed a layered approach of software with selection of software components optimized for its chips. The i.MX board support packages (BSP), common across all i.MX nodes, consists of kernel optimization, hardware drivers, and unit tests. The company also provides multimedia codecs (ARM and Video processing unit accelerated). i.MX also includes middleware with reuse of open source frameworks like multimedia framework plugins, power management, security/DRM, or graphics (OpenGL/OpenVG).

=== Linux ===
Freescale i.MX development kits include a Linux software stack with a GNOME Mobile environment.

On the i.MX51 family, the reference user interface is Ubuntu. The last Ubuntu version supported is 10.04.1 (still available on mirrors). Ubuntu dropped the "official" i.MX51 family support since version 10.10. Since Ubuntu 11.10 support for the i.MX53 Quickstart board is available as a preinstalled desktop or server SD card.

The OpenEmbedded Linux distribution supports several i.MX platforms. Commercial Linux support is available from companies like Lanedo, TimeSys, MontaVista, Wind River Systems and Mentor Graphics.

=== Android ===
In February 2010, Freescale launched an Android platform for the i.MX5x family.

=== Chromium ===
In early 2010 Freescale demoed ChromiumOS running on the i.MX515 processor. The company has not disclosed any further plans about Chromium or Chrome.

=== FreeBSD ===
Support for the Freescale i.MX51 was added to FreeBSD on 2013-03-20. Support for other members of the i.MX5 family has been added since.

Support for the Freescale i.MX 6 family was added to FreeBSD on 2013-10-31.

=== Genode ===
The Operating System Framework supports the i.MX range. Sculpt OS is maintained for the MNT Reform family (i.MX8).

=== NetBSD ===
NetBSD 6.0 comes with support for the Freescale i.MX51. In version 7.0, support for i.MX 6 based boards was added.

=== OpenBSD ===
Support for the FreeScale's i.MX 6 series SoC was added to OpenBSD's head on the 2013-09-06.

=== Plan 9 ===
9front runs on MNT Reform (i.MX8) since mid-2022.

=== Real-time OS ===
Freescale has a range of partners providing real-time operating systems and software running on the i.MX processors, such as Trinity Convergence, Adeneo, Thundersoft, Intrinsyc, Wind River Systems, QNX, Green Hills, SYSGO and Mentor Graphics.

=== RISC OS ===
i.MX support in RISC OS has been available since 2015.

=== Windows CE ===
Freescale i.MX development kits include WinCE.

=== wolfSSL ===
wolfSSL includes support for i.MX6 following all versions after (and including) wolfSSL v3.14.0. wolfSSL also provides additional support for using the Cryptographic Assistance and Assurance Module (CAAM) on the i.MX6.

== Reference designs ==
In January 2010, Freescale announced the first platform of its Smart Application Blueprint for Rapid Engineering (SABRE) series. It is a smartbook (tablet form factor with 7" touch screen resistive), running on i.MX515.

In February 2010, Freescale demoed the SABRE platform for eReaders, based on i.MX515.

Many more reference boards are mentioned and supported through the Freescale i.MX community website. These include:

- i.MX23EVK
- i.MX25PDK
- i.MX28EVK
- MX37PDK
- i.MX35PDK
- i.MX51EVK
- i.MX53QSB (LOCO)

== See also ==
- ARM Architecture
- List of Freescale Microcontrollers
- eBook reader
- Automotive infotainment
- Chumby
- Device tree
- Smartbook
- System on a chip
