= Adreno =

Series of graphics processing units

Adreno (formerly ATI Mobile Graphics Technology Imageon)
- Launched: 2009
- Designed by: Qualcomm
- Manufactured by: TSMC foundry and Samsung foundry
- Fabrication process: 3 to 90 nm

Specifications
- Compute: up to 7577.6 GFLOPS (FP32)
- Clock rate: 133 MHz to 1850 MHz
- Memory support: LPDDR, LPDDR2, LPDDR3, LPDDR4, LPDDR4X, LPDDR5 & LPDDR5X
- Memory clock rate: 166.5 MHz to 5300 MHz
- PCIe support: No

Supported graphics APIs
- DirectX: 11 and 12
- Direct3D: 11 and 12
- OpenGL ES: 1.0 to 3.2
- Vulkan: 1.0 to 1.4

Supported compute APIs
- OpenCL: 1.1 to 3.0

Media engine
- Encode codecs: H.264/AVC, H.265/HEVC, AV1, VP9, and VP8
- Decode codecs: H.264/AVC, H.265/HEVC, AV1, VP9, and VP8
- Color bit-depth: 10-bit Color HDR10, 8-bit Color, 6-bit
- Encoder supported: Qualcomm VPU
- Display outputs: MIPI DSI, HDMI, DP

Support status
- Active development

Adreno (formerly ATI Mobile Graphics) is a series of graphics processing unit (GPU) semiconductor intellectual property cores developed by Qualcomm and used in many of their SoCs.

== History ==
Adreno is an integrated graphics processing unit (GPU) within Qualcomm's Snapdragon applications processors, that was jointly developed by ATI Technologies in conjunction with Qualcomm's preexisting "QShader" GPU architecture, and coalesced into a single family of GPUs that rebranded as Adreno in 2008, just prior to AMD's mobile division being sold to Qualcomm in January 2009 for $65M. Early Adreno models included the Adreno 100 and 110, which had 2D graphics acceleration and limited multimedia capabilities. Prior to 2008, 3D graphics on mobile platforms were commonly handled using software-based rendering engines, which limited their performance and consumed too much power to be used for anything other than rudimentary mobile graphics applications. With growing demand for more advanced multimedia and 3D graphics capabilities, Qualcomm licensed the Imageon IP from AMD, in order to add hardware-accelerated 3D capabilities to their mobile products. Further collaboration with AMD resulted in the development of the Adreno 200, originally named the AMD Z430, based on a mobile Imageon variant of the R400 architecture used in the Xenos GPU of the Xbox 360 video game console and released in 2008, which was integrated into the first Snapdragon SoC. In January 2009, AMD sold their entire Imageon handheld device graphics division to Qualcomm.

== Technical details ==
=== Before Adreno ===
- Support up to 320x240
- Defender3 and Stargate have Texture compression

Name	Microarchitecture				Fab (nm)	Clock [MHz]	Memory technology	Fillrate			GFLOPS			API (version)						Qualcomm SoC	Ref.
Name	Type	SIMDs, FP32 (ALUs) (Note: Adreno ALU = ALU x MP amount)	On-chip graphics memory	TMU	Fab (nm)	Clock [MHz]	Memory bandwidth	Triangle [MT/s]	Pixel [GP/s]	Texture [GT/s]	(FP64)	(FP32)	(FP16)	Vulkan	OpenGL ES	OpenVG	OpenCL	OpenGL	Direct3D	Qualcomm SoC	Ref.
Defender2	fixed function pipeline				90		SDRAM	0.05 0.25	0.0004 0.007						1.0					MSM6550, MSM6550A, MSM6800, MSM6150 MSM6175, MSM6280, MSM6275	
Defender3	fixed function pipeline				90 or 65			0.25	0.022						1.0					MSM6800A, MSM6575	
Stargate	fixed function pipeline							0.6	0.09						1.1					MSM6280A, MSM6290, QSC6155, QSC6165, QSC6175, QSC6185, QSC6195, QSC6285, QSC6295, QSC6695	

=== Adreno 100 series ===
- Adreno 130 is rebrand of Imageon 3D

Name	Microarchitecture				Fab (nm)	Clock [MHz]	Memory technology	Fillrate			GFLOPS			API (version)						Qualcomm SoC	Ref.
Name	Type	SIMDs, FP32 (ALUs)	On-chip graphics memory	TMU	Fab (nm)	Clock [MHz]	Memory bandwidth	Triangle [MT/s]	Pixel [GP/s]	Texture [GT/s]	(FP64)	(FP32)	(FP16)	Vulkan	OpenGL ES	OpenVG	OpenCL	OpenGL	Direct3D	Qualcomm SoC	Ref.
Adreno 100	fixed function pipeline													None	1.0						
Adreno 110	fixed function pipeline													None	1.1						
Adreno 120	fixed function pipeline													None	1.1	1.1					
Adreno 130	fixed function pipeline	?	?		90 or 65		?	1.6 4	? 0.133		? 0.3	? 1.2	? 2.4	None	1.1	1.1	—N/a	—N/a	Direct3D Mobile	MSM7x00, MSM7x00A, MSM7x01, MSM7x01A	

=== Adreno 200 series - yamato / leia ===
- All models support the following APIs: Direct3D 11 (feature level 9_3), OpenGL ES 2.0

Name	Microarchitecture				Fab (nm)	Clock [MHz]	Memory technology	Fillrate			GFLOPS			API (version)						Qualcomm SoC	Ref.
Name	Type	SIMDs, FP32 (ALUs)	On-chip graphics memory	TMU	Fab (nm)	Clock [MHz]	Memory bandwidth	Triangle [MT/s]	Pixel [GP/s]	Texture [GT/s]	(FP64)	(FP32)	(FP16)	Vulkan	OpenGL ES	OpenVG	OpenCL	OpenGL	Direct3D	Qualcomm SoC	Ref.
Adreno 200 (ATI Imageon Z430)	Unified shader model 5-way VLIW	8 [8]	256 KB		65	133	LPDDR-333 Single-channel 32-bit @ 166.5 MHz (1.3 GB/s)	22.85	0.133		0.53	2.12	4.25	—N/a	2.0	1.1	—N/a	1.4 (freedreno driver)	11 (feature level 9_3)	Snapdragon S1 (MSM7227, MSM7627 QSD8250, QSD8650), Freescale i.MX51, i.MX53	
Adreno 200 'enhanced'	Unified shader model 5-way VLIW	8 [8]	256 KB		45	200; 226; 245	LPDDR-400 Single-channel 32-bit @ 200 MHz (1.6 GB/s); LPDDR-667 Single-channel 32-bit @ 333 MHz (2.6 GB/s); LPDDR-800 Single-channel 32-bit @ 400 MHz (3.2 GB/s)	42	0.200; 0.226; 0.245		0.80; 0.904; 0.98	3.20; 3.616; 3.92	6.40; 7.232; 7.84	—N/a	2.0	1.1	—N/a	1.4 (freedreno driver)	11 (feature level 9_3)	Snapdragon S1 (MSM7227A, MSM7627A, MSM7225A, MSM7625A)	
Adreno 203	Unified shader model 5-way VLIW	16 [16]	256 KB		45	245; 400	LPDDR2-533 Single-channel 32-bit @ 266 MHz (2.1 GB/s); LPDDR2-667 Single-channel 32-bit @ 333 MHz (2.7 GB/s)	40.8; 66.6	0.245; 0.4		1.96; 3.2	7.84; 12.8	15.6; 25.6	—N/a	2.0	1.1	—N/a	1.4 (freedreno driver)	11 (feature level 9_3)	Snapdragon S4 Play (MSM8225, MSM8625), Snapdragon 200 (MSM8225Q, MSM8625Q)	
Adreno 205	Unified shader model 5-way VLIW	16 [16]	256 KB		45	245; 266	LPDDR2-666 Dual-channel 32-bit (64-bit) @ 333 MHz (5.3 GB/s)	40.8; 44.3	0.245; 0.266	0.245; 0.266	1.96; 2.12	7.84; 8.51	15.6; 17.0	—N/a	2.0	1.1	—N/a	1.4 (freedreno driver)	11 (feature level 9_3)	Snapdragon S2 (MSM7x30, MSM8x55, APQ8055)	
Adreno 2xx series - leia
Adreno 220	Unified shader model 5-way VLIW	16 [32]	512 KB		45	266	LPDDR2-666 Single-channel 32-bit @ 333 MHz (2.6 GB/s)	88.7	0.53	0.53	4.25	17.0	34.0	—N/a	2.0	1.1	—N/a	1.4 (freedreno driver)	11 (feature level 9_3)	Snapdragon S3 (APQ8060, MSM8x60)	
Adreno 225	Unified shader model 5-way VLIW	16 [32]	512 KB		28	200; 300; 400	LPDDR2-1000 Dual-channel 32-bit (64-bit) @ 500 MHz (8.0 GB/s)	133.3	0.4; 0.6; 0.8	0.4; 0.6; 0.8	3.2; 4.8; 6.4	12.8; 19.2; 25.6	25.6; 38.4; 51.2	—N/a	2.0	1.1	—N/a	1.4 (freedreno driver)	11 (feature level 9_3)	Snapdragon S4 Plus (APQ8060A, MSM8x60A, MSM8960)	

=== Adreno 300 series - oxili ===
- All models support the following APIs: Direct3D 11 (feature level 9_3), OpenCL 1.1, OpenGL ES 3.0
- Move from VLIW to superscalar architecture

Name	Microarchitecture				Fab (nm)	Clock [MHz]	Memory technology	Fillrate			GFLOPS			API (version)						Qualcomm SoC	Ref.
Name	Type	SIMDs, FP32 (ALUs)	On-chip graphics memory	TMU	Fab (nm)	Clock [MHz]	Memory bandwidth	Triangle [MT/s]	Pixel [GP/s]	Texture [GT/s]	(FP64)	(FP32)	(FP16)	Vulkan	OpenGL ES	OpenVG	OpenCL	OpenGL	Direct3D	Qualcomm SoC	Ref.
Adreno 302	Unified shader model Scalar instruction set	16 [16]			28	400	LPDDR2-666 Single-channel 32-bit @ 333 MHz (2.6 GB/s)		0.53		3.2	12.8	25.6	—N/a	3.0 (freedreno driver: 3.0, 3.1 incomplete, 3.2 partial)	1.1	1.1 embedded profile	3.1 (freedreno driver, 3.2 incomplete, 3.3 complete)	11 (feature level 9_3)	Snapdragon 200	
Adreno 304	Unified shader model Scalar instruction set	24 [24]	96 KB		28	400	LPDDR2-768 Single-channel 32-bit @ 384 MHz (3.0 GB/s); LPDDR3-1066 Single-channel 32-bit @ 533 MHz (4.2 GB/s)		0.8		4.8	19.2	38.4	—N/a	3.0 (freedreno driver: 3.0, 3.1 incomplete, 3.2 partial)	1.1	1.1 embedded profile	3.1 (freedreno driver, 3.2 incomplete, 3.3 complete)	11 (feature level 9_3)	Snapdragon 208; Snapdragon 210; Snapdragon 212	
Adreno 305 (1st Gen.)	Unified shader model Scalar instruction set	24 [24]	256 KB		28	400; 450	LPDDR2-800 Single-channel 32-bit @ 400 MHz (3.2 GB/s)		0.8; 0.9		4.8; 5.4	19.2; 21.6	38.4; 43.2	—N/a	3.0 (freedreno driver: 3.0, 3.1 incomplete, 3.2 partial)	1.1	1.1 embedded profile	3.1 (freedreno driver, 3.2 incomplete, 3.3 complete)	11 (feature level 9_3)	Snapdragon S4 Plus (MSM8x27)	
Adreno 305 (2nd Gen.)	Unified shader model Scalar instruction set	24 [24]	128 KB		28	400; 450	LPDDR2-800 Single-channel 32-bit @ 400 MHz (3.2 GB/s); LPDDR3-1066 Single-channel 32-bit @ 533 MHz (4.2 GB/s)		0.8; 0.9		4.8; 5.4	19.2; 21.6	38.4; 43.2	—N/a	3.0 (freedreno driver: 3.0, 3.1 incomplete, 3.2 partial)	1.1	1.1 embedded profile	3.1 (freedreno driver, 3.2 incomplete, 3.3 complete)	11 (feature level 9_3)	Snapdragon 200 (MSM8210, MSM8610, MSM8212, MSM8612); Snapdragon 400 (MSM8x26, MSM8x28, MSM8x30, MSM8x30AB, APQ8026, APQ8030)	
Adreno 306	Unified shader model Scalar instruction set	24 [24]	128 KB		28	400; 450	LPDDR2/3-1066 Single-channel 32-bit @ 533 MHz (4.2 GB/s)		0.8; 0.9		4.8; 5.4	19.2; 21.6	38.4; 43.2	—N/a	3.0 (freedreno driver: 3.0, 3.1 incomplete, 3.2 partial)	1.1	1.1 embedded profile	3.1 (freedreno driver, 3.2 incomplete, 3.3 complete)	11 (feature level 9_3)	Snapdragon 410 (MSM8916), Snapdragon 412 (MSM8916v2)	
Adreno 308	Unified shader model Scalar instruction set	24 [24]	128 KB		28	485; 598	LPDDR3-1333 Single-channel 32-bit @ 666.5 MHz (5.3 GB/s)		0.97; 1.2		5.82; 7.18	23.3; 28.7	46.6; 57.4	—N/a	3.0 (freedreno driver: 3.0, 3.1 incomplete, 3.2 partial)	1.1	1.1 embedded profile	3.1 (freedreno driver, 3.2 incomplete, 3.3 complete)	11 (feature level 9_3)	QM215; Snapdragon 425 (MSM8917); Snapdragon 427 (MSM8920)	
Adreno 320 (1st Gen.)	Unified shader model Scalar instruction set	16 [64]	512 KB		28	400	LPDDR2-1066 Dual-channel 32-bit (64-bit) @ 533 MHz (8.5 GB/s)	225	3.2	3.2	12.8	51.2	102.4	—N/a	3.0 (freedreno driver: 3.0, 3.1 incomplete, 3.2 partial)	1.1	1.1 embedded profile	3.1 (freedreno driver, 3.2 incomplete, 3.3 complete)	11 (feature level 9_3)	Snapdragon S4 Pro (MSM8960T, APQ8064, APQ8064-1AA), Snapdragon S4 Prime (MPQ8064)	
Adreno 320 (2nd Gen.)	Unified shader model Scalar instruction set	24 [96]	512 KB		28	400; 450	LPDDR3-1200 Dual-channel 32-bit (64-bit) @ 600 MHz (9.6 GB/s)	225; 253.1	3.2; 3.6	3.2; 3.6	19.2; 21.6	76.8; 86.4	153.6; 172.8	—N/a	3.0 (freedreno driver: 3.0, 3.1 incomplete, 3.2 partial)	1.1	1.1 embedded profile	3.1 (freedreno driver, 3.2 incomplete, 3.3 complete)	11 (feature level 9_3)	Snapdragon 600 (APQ8064T, APQ8064AB)	
Adreno 330	Unified shader model Scalar instruction set	32 [128]	1024 KB		28	450; 550; 578	LPDDR3-1600 Dual-channel 32-bit (64-bit) @ 800 MHz (12.8 GB/s)	253.1; 309.4; 325.1	3.6; 4.4; 4.624		28.8; 35.2; 36.9	115.2; 140.8; 147.9	230.4; 281.6; 295.9	—N/a	3.0 (freedreno driver: 3.0, 3.1 incomplete, 3.2 partial)	1.1	1.1 embedded profile	3.1 (freedreno driver, 3.2 incomplete, 3.3 complete)	11 (feature level 9_3)	Snapdragon 800 (MSM8974, APQ8074), Snapdragon 801 (MSM8274AB, MSM8974AB, MSM8974AC)	

=== Adreno 400 series ===
- All models support the following APIs: Direct3D 11, OpenCL 1.2, OpenGL ES 3.2 and Vulkan 1.0 (except Adreno 405)

Name	Microarchitecture				Fab (nm)	Clock [MHz]	Memory technology	Fillrate			GFLOPS			API (version)						Qualcomm SoC	Ref.
Name	Type	SIMDs, FP32 (ALUs)	On-chip graphics memory	TMU	Fab (nm)	Clock [MHz]	Memory bandwidth	Triangle [MT/s]	Pixel [GP/s]	Texture [GT/s]	(FP64)	(FP32)	(FP16)	Vulkan	OpenGL ES	OpenVG	OpenCL	OpenGL	Direct3D	Qualcomm SoC	Ref.
Adreno 4xx series
Adreno 405	Unified shader model	48 [48]	256 KB		28	550	LPDDR3-1333 Single- channel 32-bit @ 666.5 MHz (5.3 GB/s) LPDDR3-1866 Single- channel 32-bit @ 933 MHz (7.4 GB/s)				13.2	52.8	105.6	—N/a	3.2 (freedreno driver: 3.0, 3.1 incomplete, 3.2 partial)	1.1	1.2 full profile	3.1 (freedreno driver, 3.2 incomplete, 3.3 complete)	11 (feature level 11_1)	Snapdragon 415 (MSM8929), Snapdragon 610 (MSM8936), Snapdragon 615 (MSM8939), Snapdragon 616 (MSM8939v2), Snapdragon 617 (MSM8952)	
Adreno 418	Unified shader model	32 [128]	512 KB		20	600	LPDDR3-1866 Dual-channel 32-bit (64-bit) @ 933 MHz (14.9 GB/s)				38.4	153.6	307.2	1.0	3.2 (freedreno driver: 3.0, 3.1 incomplete, 3.2 partial)	1.1	1.2 full profile	3.1 (freedreno driver, 3.2 incomplete, 3.3 complete)	11 (feature level 11_1)	Snapdragon 808 (MSM8992)	
Adreno 420	Unified shader model	64 [128]	1536 KB		28	500; 600	LPDDR3-1600 Dual-channel 64-bit (128-bit) @ 800 MHz (25.6 GB/s)	281.3; 337.5	4; 4.8	8; 9.6	32.0; 38.4	128.0; 153.6	256.0; 307.2	1.0	3.2 (freedreno driver: 3.0, 3.1 incomplete, 3.2 partial)	1.1	1.2 full profile	3.1 (freedreno driver, 3.2 incomplete, 3.3 complete)	11 (feature level 11_1)	Snapdragon 805 (APQ8084)	
Adreno 430	Unified shader model	48 [192]	1536 KB		20	600; 630	LPDDR4-3200 Dual-channel 32-bit (64-bit) @ 1600 MHz (25.6 GB/s)	404	4.8; 5.0	9.6; 10.0	57.6; 60.5	230.4; 241.9	460.8; 483.8	1.0	3.2 (freedreno driver: 3.0, 3.1 incomplete, 3.2 partial)	1.1	1.2 full profile	3.1 (freedreno driver, 3.2 incomplete, 3.3 complete)	11 (feature level 11_1)	Snapdragon 810 (APQ8094, MSM8994)	

=== Adreno 500 series ===
- All models support the following APIs: Direct3D 11, OpenCL 2.0, OpenGL ES 3.2 and Vulkan 1.0

Name	Microarchitecture				Fab (nm)	Clock [MHz]	Memory technology	Fillrate			GFLOPS			API (version)						Qualcomm SoC	Ref.
Name	Type	SIMDs, FP32 (ALUs)	On-chip graphics memory	TMU	Fab (nm)	Clock [MHz]	Memory bandwidth	Triangle [MT/s]	Pixel [GP/s]	Texture [GT/s]	(FP64)	(FP32)	(FP16)	Vulkan	OpenGL ES	OpenVG	OpenCL	OpenGL	Direct3D	Qualcomm SoC	Ref.
Adreno 5xx series
Adreno 504	Unified shader model + Unified memory	48 [48]	128 + 8 KB		12	320	LPDDR3-1600 Single-channel 32-bit @ 800 MHz (6.4 GB/s)	?	?	?	7.7	30.7	61.4	1.0	3.2 (freedreno driver: 3.1, 3.2 partial)	?	2.0 Full	3.1 (freedreno driver, 3.2 incomplete, 3.3 complete)	11 (feature level 11_1)	Snapdragon 429; Snapdragon Wear 4100/4100+	
Adreno 505	Unified shader model + Unified memory	48 [48]	128 + 8 KB		28	450; 650	LPDDR3-1600 Single-channel 32-bit @ 800 MHz (6.4 GB/s)			?	10.8; 15.6	43.2; 62.4	86.4; 124.8	1.0	3.2 (freedreno driver: 3.1, 3.2 partial)	?	2.0 Full	3.1 (freedreno driver, 3.2 incomplete, 3.3 complete)	11 (feature level 11_1)	Snapdragon 430; Snapdragon 435; Snapdragon 439	
Adreno 506	Unified shader model + Unified memory	48 [48]	128 + 8 KB		14	600; 650; 725	LPDDR3-1866 Single-channel 32-bit @ 933 MHz (7.4 GB/s)	?	?	?	14.4; 15.6; 17.4	57.6; 62.4; 69.6	115.2; 124.8; 139.2	1.0	3.2 (freedreno driver: 3.1, 3.2 partial)	?	2.0 Full	3.1 (freedreno driver, 3.2 incomplete, 3.3 complete)	11 (feature level 11_1)	Snapdragon 450; Snapdragon 625; Snapdragon 626; Snapdragon 632	
Adreno 508	Unified shader model + Unified memory	96 [96]			14	650	LPDDR4-2666 Dual‑channel 16‑bit (32-bit) @ 1333 MHz (10.6 GB/s)	?	?	?	31.2	124.8	249.6	1.0	3.2 (freedreno driver: 3.1, 3.2 partial)	?	2.0 Full	3.1 (freedreno driver, 3.2 incomplete, 3.3 complete)	11 (feature level 11_1)	Snapdragon 630	
Adreno 509	Unified shader model + Unified memory	64 [128]	256 + 16 KB		14	430	LPDDR4-2666 Dual‑channel 16‑bit (32-bit) @ 1333 MHz (10.6 GB/s)	?	?	?	27.5	110.1	220.2	1.0	3.2 (freedreno driver: 3.1, 3.2 partial)	?	2.0 Full	3.1 (freedreno driver, 3.2 incomplete, 3.3 complete)	11 (feature level 11_1)	Snapdragon 636	
Adreno 510	Unified shader model + Unified memory	64 [128]	256 + 16 KB		28	600; 621	LPDDR3-1866 Dual‑channel 32‑bit (64-bit) @ 933 MHz (14.9 GB/s)	?	?	?	38.4; 39.7	153.6; 159.0	307.2; 318.0	1.0	3.2 (3.1 + AEP) (freedreno driver: 3.1, 3.2 partial)	?	2.0 Full	3.1 (freedreno driver, 3.2 incomplete, 3.3 complete)	11 (feature level 11_1)	Snapdragon 650; Snapdragon 652; Snapdragon 653	
Adreno 512	Unified shader model + Unified memory	64 [128]	256 + 16 KB		14	647	LPDDR4X-3733 Dual-channel 16-bit (32-bit) @ 1866 MHz (14.9 GB/s)	?	?	?	41.4	165.6	331.3	1.0	3.2 (3.1 + AEP) (freedreno driver: 3.1, 3.2 partial)	?	2.0 Full	3.1 (freedreno driver, 3.2 incomplete, 3.3 complete)	11 (feature level 11_1)	Snapdragon 660	
Adreno 530	Unified shader model + Unified memory	64 [256]	1024 KB		14	510; 624; 653	LPDDR4-2666 Dual-channel 32-bit (64-bit) @ 1333 MHz (21.3 GB/s) or LPDDR4X-3733 Dual-channel 32-bit (64-bit) @ 1866 MHz (29.9 GB/s)	?	6.7; 8.1; 8.4	7.7; 8.1; 8.4	65.2; 79.8; 83.5	261.1; 319.4; 334.3	522.2; 638.9; 668.6	1.0	3.2 (3.1 + AEP) (freedreno driver: 3.1, 3.2 partial)	?	2.0 Full	3.1 (freedreno driver, 3.2 incomplete, 3.3 complete)	12 (feature level 11_1)	Snapdragon 820; Snapdragon 821	
Adreno 540	Unified shader model + Unified memory	64 [256]	1024 KB	16	10	670; 710	LPDDR4X-3733 Dual-channel 32-bit (64-bit) @ 1866 MHz (29.9 GB/s)	>450	8.04; 8.52	10.72; 11.36	85.8; 90.9	343.0; 363.5	686.1; 727.0	1.0	3.2 (3.1 + AEP) (freedreno driver: 3.1, 3.2 partial)	?	2.0 Full	3.1 (freedreno driver, 3.2 incomplete, 3.3 complete)	12 (feature level 11_1)	Snapdragon 835	

=== Adreno 600 series ===
- All models support the following APIs: Direct3D 12_1, OpenCL 3.0, OpenGL ES 3.2 and Vulkan 1.1
- Adreno 660 is the first mobile GPU to feature Variable Rate Shading (VRS).
- Resolution FHD & FHD+ and 4K in some model adreno 600 series.

Name	Microarchitecture				Fab (nm)	Clock [MHz]	Memory technology	Fillrate			GFLOPS			API (version)						Qualcomm SoC	Ref.
Name	Type	SIMDs, FP32 (ALUs)	On-chip graphics memory	TMU	Fab (nm)	Clock [MHz]	Memory bandwidth	Triangle [MT/s]	Pixel [GP/s]	Texture [GT/s]	(FP64)	(FP32)	(FP16)	Vulkan	OpenGL ES	OpenVG	OpenCL	OpenGL	Direct3D	Qualcomm SoC	Ref.
Adreno 6xx series
Adreno 605	Unified shader model + Unified memory		128+8 KB		14									1.0 and 1.1	3.2		2.0 Full	WIP (freedreno driver)	12 (feature level 12_1)		
Adreno 608	Unified shader model + Unified memory	128 [128]			11	430	LPDDR4X-4266 Dual-channel 16-bit (32-bit) @ 2133 MHz (17.0 GB/s)				27.5	110.1	220.2	1.0 and 1.1	3.2		2.0 Full	WIP (freedreno driver)	12 (feature level 12_1)	Snapdragon SA6155P	
Adreno 610	Unified shader model + Unified memory	128 [128]	128+4 KB		11	600; 750; 950; 1050					38.4; 48.0; 60.8; 67.2	153.6; 192.0; 243.2; 268.8	307.2; 384.0; 486.4; 537.6	1.0 and 1.1	3.2		2.0 Full	WIP (freedreno driver)	12 (feature level 12_1)	Snapdragon 460; Snapdragon 662; Snapdragon 665; QCS4290; Snapdragon 6s 4G Gen 1	
Adreno 610	Unified shader model + Unified memory	128 [128]	128+4 KB		6	1114; 1260	LPDDR4X-4266 Dual-channel 16-bit (32-bit) @ 2133 MHz (17.0 GB/s)				71.3; 80.6	285.2; 322.6	570.4; 645.1	1.0 and 1.1	3.2		2.0 Full	WIP (freedreno driver)	12 (feature level 12_1)	Snapdragon 680; Snapdragon 685; Snapdragon 6s 4G Gen 2	
Adreno 611	Unified shader model + Unified memory	128 [128]	256+16 KB		4		LPDDR4X-4266 Dual-channel 16-bit (32-bit) @ 2133 MHz (17.0 GB/s)							1.0 and 1.1	3.2		2.0 Full	WIP (freedreno driver)	12 (feature level 12_1)	Snapdragon 4s Gen 2	
Adreno 612	Unified shader model + Unified memory	128 [128]	256+16 KB		11	845; 895	LPDDR4X-3200 Dual‑channel 16‑bit (32-bit) @ 1600 MHz (12.8 GB/s) or LPDDR4X-3733 Dual‑channel 16‑bit (32-bit) @ 1866 MHz (14.9 GB/s)				54.1; 57.3	216.3; 229.1	432.6; 458.2	1.0 and 1.1	3.2		2.0 Full	WIP (freedreno driver)	12 (feature level 12_1)	QCS615; Snapdragon 675; Snapdragon 678	
Adreno 613	Unified shader model + Unified memory	128 [128]	256+16 KB		4	955; 1010	LPDDR4X-4266 Dual-channel 16-bit (32-bit) @ 2133 MHz (17.0 GB/s) or LPDDR5-6400 Dual-channel 16-bit (32-bit) @ 3200 MHz (25.6 GB/s)				61.1; 64.6	244.5; 258.6	489.0; 517.1	1.0 and 1.1	3.2		2.0 Full	WIP (freedreno driver)	12 (feature level 12_1)	Snapdragon 4 Gen 2 Snapdragon 4 Gen 2 AE; Snapdragon 4 Gen 4	
Adreno 615	Unified shader model + Unified memory	256 [256]	512 KB		10	430	LPDDR4X-3733 Dual‑channel 16‑bit (32-bit) @ 1866 MHz (14.9 GB/s)				55.0	220.2	430.3	1.0 and 1.1	3.2		2.0 Full	WIP (freedreno driver)	12 (feature level 12_1)	QCS603; QCS605; Snapdragon 670	
Adreno 616	Unified shader model + Unified memory	256 [256]	512 KB		10	504; 610	LPDDR4X-3733 Dual‑channel 16‑bit (32-bit) @ 1866 MHz (14.9 GB/s)				64.5; 78.1	258.0; 312.3	516.1; 624.6	1.0 and 1.1	3.2		2.0 Full	WIP (freedreno driver)	12 (feature level 12_1)	Snapdragon 710; Snapdragon 712	
Adreno 618	Unified shader model + Unified memory	256 [256]	512 KB		8	610; 700; 750; 800; 825	LPDDR4X-3733 Dual‑channel 16‑bit (32-bit) @ 1866 MHz (14.9 GB/s)				78.1; 89.6; 96.0; 102.4; 105.6	312.3; 358.4; 384.0; 409.6; 422.4	624.6; 716.8; 768.0; 819.2; 844.8	1.0 and 1.1	3.2		2.0 Full	WIP (freedreno driver)	12 (feature level 12_1)	Snapdragon 720G; Snapdragon 730; Snapdragon 730G; Snapdragon 732G; Snapdragon 7c Snapdragon 7c Gen 2	
Adreno 619L	Unified shader model + Unified memory	256 [256]	512 KB		8	565	LPDDR4X-4266 Dual-channel 16-bit (32-bit) @ 2133 MHz (17.0 GB/s)				72.3	289.3	578.6	1.0 and 1.1	3.2		2.0 Full	WIP (freedreno driver)	12 (feature level 12_1)	Snapdragon 690	
Adreno 619	Unified shader model + Unified memory	256 [256]	512 KB		8	650; 800	LPDDR4X-4266 Dual-channel 16-bit (32-bit) @ 2133 MHz (17.0 GB/s)				83.2 102.4	332.8 409.6	665.6 819.2	1.0 and 1.1	3.2		2.0 Full	WIP (freedreno driver)	12 (feature level 12_1)	Snapdragon 480/480+ Snapdragon 750G	
Adreno 619	Unified shader model + Unified memory	256 [256]	512 KB		6	700; 840; 900	LPDDR4X-4266 Dual-channel 16-bit (32-bit) @ 2133 MHz (17.0 GB/s)				89.6; 107.5; 115.2	358.4; 430.1; 460.8	716.8; 860.2; 921.6	1.0 and 1.1	3.2		2.0 Full	WIP (freedreno driver)	12 (feature level 12_1)	Snapdragon 4 Gen 1 Snapdragon 695; Snapdragon 6s Gen 3	
Adreno 620	Unified shader model + Unified memory	384 [384]	512 KB		7	540; 625; 750	LPDDR4X-4266 Dual-channel 16-bit (32-bit) @ 2133 MHz (17.0 GB/s)		5.8; 6.7; 8.1		103.7; 120.0; 144.0	414.7; 480.0; 576.0	829.4; 960.0; 1152.0	1.0 and 1.1	3.2		2.0 Full	WIP (freedreno driver)	12 (feature level 12_1)	Snapdragon 765; Snapdragon 765G; Snapdragon 768G	
Adreno 622	Unified shader model + Unified memory	?			3									1.3	3.2		2.0 Full	WIP (freedreno driver)	12 (feature level 12_1)	Snapdragon Wear Elite	
Adreno 623	Unified shader model + Unified memory	?	1536 KB		?	599; 877	LPDDR5X-6400 Quad-channel 16-bit (64-bit) @ 3200 MHz (51.2 GB/s)							1.2	3.2		2.0 Full	WIP (freedreno driver)	12 (feature level 12_1)	QCS8275	
Adreno 629	Unified shader model + Unified memory	256 [256]	512 KB		4	840	LPDDR4X-4266 Dual-channel 16-bit (32-bit) @ 2133 MHz (17.0 GB/s)							1.3	3.2		3.0	WIP (freedreno driver)	12 (feature level 12_1)	Snapdragon 4 Gen 5	
Adreno 630	Unified shader model + Unified memory	256 [512]	1024 KB	24	10	710	LPDDR4X-4266 Quad-channel 16-bit (64-bit) @ 1866 MHz (29.8 GB/s)	?	11.36	17.04	181.7	727.0	727.0	1.0 and 1.1	3.2		2.0 Full	WIP (freedreno driver)	12 (feature level 12_1)	Snapdragon 845; Snapdragon 850	
Adreno 640	Unified shader model + Unified memory	384 [768]	1024 KB	48	7	585; 675	LPDDR4X-4266 Quad-channel 16-bit (64-bit) @ 2133 MHz (34.1 GB/s)	?	9.36; 10.8	28.08; 32.4	224.6; 259.2	898.5; 1036.8	898.5; 1036.8	1.0 and 1.1	3.2		2.0 Full	WIP (freedreno driver)	12 (feature level 12_1)	Snapdragon 855/855+ Snapdragon 860; Snapdragon 855A (SA8155P)	
Adreno 642L	Unified shader model + Unified memory	256 [512]	512 KB		6	550; 608; 700; 719	LPDDR5-6400 Dual-channel 16-bit (32-bit) @ 3200 MHz (25.6 GB/s)				140.8; 155.6; 179.2; 184.1	563.2; 622.6; 716.8; 736.3	1126.4; 1245.2; 1433.6; 1472.5	1.0 and 1.1	3.2		2.0 Full	WIP (freedreno driver)	12 (feature level 12_1)	Snapdragon 778G/778G+ Snapdragon 7C+ Gen 3 Snapdragon 782G	
Adreno 642	Unified shader model + Unified memory	256 [768]			5	490	LPDDR4X-4266 Dual-channel 16-bit (32-bit) @ 2133 MHz (17.0 GB/s)				188.2	752.6	1505.3	1.0 and 1.1	3.2		2.0 Full	WIP (freedreno driver)	12 (feature level 12_1)	Snapdragon 780G	
Adreno 643L	Unified shader model + Unified memory	256 [768]			6	812	LPDDR4X-4266 Dual-channel 16-bit (32-bit) @ 2133 MHz (17.0 GB/s) or LPDDR5-6400 Dual-channel 16-bit (32-bit) @ 3200 MHz (25.6 GB/s)				311.8	1247.2	2494.4	1.0 and 1.1	3.2		2.0 Full	WIP (freedreno driver)	12 (feature level 12_1)	QCS6490; QCM6490	
Adreno 644	Unified shader model + Unified memory	256 [768]			4	660	LPDDR5-6400 Dual-channel 16-bit (32-bit) @ 3200 MHz (25.6 GB/s)				253.4	1013.8	2027.5	1.0 and 1.1	3.2		2.0 Full	WIP (freedreno driver)	12 (feature level 12_1)	Snapdragon 7 Gen 1	
Adreno 650	Unified shader model + Unified memory	256 [768]	1024 KB	48	7	587; 670	LPDDR4X-4266 or LPDDR5-6400 Quad-channel 16-bit (64-bit) @ 2133 MHz or 3200 MHz (34.1 GB/s or 44.0 GB/s)		14.09; 16.08	28.18; 32.16	225.4; 257.3	901.6; 1029.1	1803.3; 2058.2	1.0 and 1.1	3.2		2.0 Full	WIP (freedreno driver)	12 (feature level 12_1)	Snapdragon 865/865+ Snapdragon 870; QCS8250	
Adreno 660	Unified shader model + Unified memory	256 [768]	1024 KB	48	5	840; 900	LPDDR5-6400 Quad-channel 16-bit (64-bit) @ 3200 MHz (51.2 GB/s)		20.16; 21.6	40.32; 43.2	322.6; 345.6	1290.2; 1382.4	2580.5; 2764.8	1.0 and 1.1	3.2		2.0 Full	WIP (freedreno driver)	12 (feature level 12_1)	Snapdragon 888/888+ Snapdragon G3x Gen 1	
Adreno 663	Unified shader model + Unified memory	256 [768]	1536 KB	48	5	530; 800	LPDDR5-6400 Hexa-channel 16-bit (96-bit) @ 3200 MHz (76.8 GB/s)		12.7; 19.2	25.4; 38.4	203.5; 307.2	814.1; 1228.8	1628.2; 2457.6	1.2	3.2		2.0 Full	WIP (freedreno driver)	12 (feature level 12_1)	QCS9075; QCS9100; SA8255P	
Adreno 675	Unified shader model + Unified memory	?	?		7	590	LPDDR4X-4266 Quad-channel 16-bit (64-bit) @ 2133 MHz (34.1 GB/s)							1.0 and 1.1	3.2		2.0 Full	WIP (freedreno driver)	12 (feature level 12_1)	Snapdragon 8c	
Adreno 680	Unified shader model + Unified memory	384 [1536]	?		7	585	LPDDR4X-4266 Octa-channel 16-bit (128-bit) @ 2133 MHz (68.2 GB/s)				449.3	1797.1	3594.2	1.0 and 1.1	3.2		2.0 Full	WIP (freedreno driver)	12 (feature level 12_1)	Snapdragon 8cx Snapdragon SA8195P	
Adreno 685	Unified shader model + Unified memory	384 [1536]	?		7	590	LPDDR4X-4266 Octa-channel 16-bit (128-bit) @ 2133 MHz (68.2 GB/s)				453.1	1812.4	3624.9	1.0 and 1.1	3.2		2.0 Full	WIP (freedreno driver)	12 (feature level 12_1)	Microsoft SQ1	
Adreno 690 (8cx gen 2)	Unified shader model + Unified memory	384 [1536]			7	661; 680	LPDDR4X-4266 Octa-channel 16-bit (128-bit) @ 2133 MHz (68.2 GB/s)				507.6; 522.2	2030.5; 2088.9	4061.1; 4177.9	1.0 and 1.1	3.2		2.0 Full	WIP (freedreno driver)	12 (feature level 12_1)	Snapdragon 8cx Gen 2 Microsoft SQ2	
Adreno 690 (8cx gen 3)	Unified shader model + Unified memory	256 [2048]			5	733; 900	LPDDR4X-4266 Octa-channel 16-bit (128-bit) @ 2133 MHz (68.2 GB/s)				750.5; 921.6	3002.3; 3686.4	6004.6; 7372.8	1.0 and 1.1	3.2		2.0 Full	WIP (freedreno driver)	12 (feature level 12_1)	SA8295P; Snapdragon 8cx Gen 3 Microsoft SQ3	

=== Adreno 700 series ===
- All models support the following APIs: Direct3D 12_1, OpenCL 3.0, OpenGL ES 3.2 and Vulkan 1.1
- Adreno 740 is the first GPU from Qualcomm to feature ray tracing
- Modern APIs and Display Support: The GPUs support modern graphics APIs like OpenGL ES 3.2, OpenCL 2.0, DirectX 12, and Vulkan. They are also capable of driving high-resolution and high-refresh-rate displays, such as WFHD+ at 168 Hz and 4K at 60 Hz with support for HDR10+, HLG, and Dolby Vision.

Name	Microarchitecture				Fab (nm)	Clock [MHz]	Memory technology	Fillrate			GFLOPS			Latest API (version) supported						Qualcomm SoC	Ref.
Name	Type	SIMDs, FP32 (ALUs)	On-chip graphics memory	TMU	Fab (nm)	Clock [MHz]	Memory bandwidth	Triangle [MT/s]	Pixel [GP/s]	Texture [GT/s]	(FP64)	(FP32)	(FP16)	Vulkan	OpenGL ES	OpenVG	OpenCL	OpenGL	Direct3D	Qualcomm SoC	Ref.
Adreno 702	Unified shader model + Unified memory				4; 11	845; 1000	LPDDR3-1866 Single-channel 32-bit @ 933 MHz (7.4 GB/s) or LPDDR4-2133 Single‑channel 16‑bit (16-bit) @ 1066 MHz (4.2 GB/s) or LPDDR4X-3608 Dual‑channel 16‑bit (32-bit) @ 1804 MHz (14.4 GB/s)							1.1	3.1	1.1	2.0		12.1	QCS2290; QRB2210; Snapdragon Wear W5 Gen 1/W5+ Gen 1	
Adreno 710	Unified shader model + Unified memory	256 [256]	512 KB	16	4	676; 940; 1010	LPDDR4X-4266 Dual‑channel 16‑bit (32-bit) @ 2133 MHz (17 GB/s) or LPDDR5-5500 Dual‑channel 16‑bit (32-bit) @ 2750 MHz (22 GB/s) or LPDDR5-6400 Dual‑channel 16‑bit (32-bit) @ 3200 MHz (25.6 GB/s)		5.41; 7.52; 8.08	10.82; 15.04; 16.16	86.5; 120.3; 129.3	346.1; 481.3; 517.1	692.2; 962.6; 1034.2	1.3	3.2		2.0		12.1	Snapdragon 6 Gen 1 Snapdragon 6 Gen 3 Snapdragon 7s Gen 2	
Adreno 720	Unified shader model + Unified memory	256 [512]	1 MB	32	4	975	LPDDR4X-4266 Dual‑channel 16‑bit (32-bit) @ 2133 MHz (17 GB/s) or LPDDR5-6400 Dual‑channel 16‑bit (32-bit) @ 3200 MHz (25.6 GB/s)		15.6	31.2	249.6	998.4	1996.8	1.3	3.2		2.0		12.1	Snapdragon 7 Gen 3	
Adreno 722	Unified shader model + Unified memory	256 [512]	1 MB	32	4	1150	LPDDR4X-4266 Dual‑channel 16‑bit (32-bit) @ 2133 MHz (17 GB/s) or LPDDR5-6400 Dual‑channel 16‑bit (32-bit) @ 3200 MHz (25.6 GB/s) or LPDDR5X-8400 Dual‑channel 16‑bit (32-bit) @ 4200 MHz (33.6 GB/s)		18.4	36.8	294.4	1177.6	2355.2	1.3	3.2		2.0		12.1	Snapdragon 7 Gen 4 CQ7790	
Adreno 725	Unified shader model + Unified memory	256 [1024]	2 MB	64	4	580	LPDDR5-6400 Quad-channel 16-bit (64-bit) @ 3200 MHz (51.2 GB/s)		18.56	37.12	297.0	1187.8	2375.7	1.1	3.2	1.2	2.0		12.1	Snapdragon 7+ Gen 2	
Adreno 730	Unified shader model + Unified memory	256 [1024]	2 MB	64	4	818; 900	LPDDR5-6400 Quad-channel 16-bit (64-bit) @ 3200 MHz (51.2 GB/s)		26.17; 28.8	52.35; 57.6	418.8; 460.8	1675.3; 1843.2	3350.5; 3686.4	1.1	3.2	1.2	2.0		12.1	Snapdragon 8/8+ Gen 1	
Adreno 732	Unified shader model + Unified memory	256 [768]	1 MB	48	4	950	LPDDR5X-8400 Quad-channel 16-bit (64-bit) @ 4200 MHz (67.2 GB/s)		22.8	45.6	364.8	1459.2	2918.4	1.3	3.2	1.2	2.0		12.1	Snapdragon 7+ Gen 3	
Adreno 735	Unified shader model + Unified memory	256 [768]	1 MB	48	4	1100	LPDDR5X-8400 Quad-channel 16-bit (64-bit) @ 4200 MHz (67.2 GB/s)		26.4	52.8	422.4	1689.6	3379.2	1.3	3.2	1.2	2.0		12.1	Snapdragon 8s Gen 3	
Adreno 740	Unified shader model + Unified memory	256 [1536]	3 MB	96	4	680; 719	LPDDR5X-8400 Quad-channel 16-bit (64-bit) @ 4200 MHz (67.2 GB/s)		32.64; 34.51	65.28; 69.02	522.2; 552.2	2089.0; 2208.8	4177.9; 4417.5	1.3	3.2	1.2	2.0		12.1	Snapdragon 8 Gen 2 Snapdragon 8 Gen 2 for Galaxy/Leading Version; Snapdragon XR2/XR2+ Gen 2 QCS8550	
Adreno 750	Unified shader model + Unified memory	256 [1536]	3 MB	96	4	903; 1000	LPDDR5X-9600 Quad-channel 16-bit (64-bit) @ 4800 MHz (76.8 GB/s)		43.34; 48	86.68; 96	693.5; 768.0	2774.0; 3072.0	5548.0; 6144.0	1.3	3.2	1.2	2.0		12.1	Snapdragon 8 Gen 3 Snapdragon 8 Gen 3 for Galaxy/Leading Version	

=== Adreno 800 series ===
- Introduced with the Adreno 810 in the Snapdragon 7s Gen 3 in August 2024.
- Uses a sliced architecture, with 3 slices with 4 CUs and 4 MB cache each in the Adreno 830.
- UBWC v6: The architecture incorporates version 6 of Universal Bandwidth Compression (UBWC).

Name	Microarchitecture				Fab (nm)	Clock [MHz]	Memory technology	Fillrate			GFLOPS			Latest API (version) supported						Qualcomm SoC	Ref.
Name	Type	SIMDs, FP32 (ALUs)	On-chip graphics memory	TMU	Fab (nm)	Clock [MHz]	Memory bandwidth	Triangle [MT/s]	Pixel [GP/s]	Texture [GT/s]	(FP64)	(FP32)	(FP16)	Vulkan	OpenGL ES	OpenVG	OpenCL	OpenGL	Direct3D	Qualcomm SoC	Ref.
Adreno 810	Unified shader model + Unified memory	128 [256]	576 KB	16	4	895; 1050; 1150	LPDDR4X dual-channel 16-bit (32-bit) 2133 MHz (17.0 GB/s) or LPDDR5 dual-channel 16-bit (32-bit) 3200 MHz (25.6 GB/s)		7.16; 8.4; 9.2	14.32; 16.8; 18.4	114.6; 134.4; 147.2	458.2; 537.6; 588.8	916.5; 1075.2; 1177.6	1.3	3.2		3.0			Snapdragon 6 Gen 4 Snapdragon 7s Gen 3 Snapdragon 7s Gen 4	
Adreno 812	Unified shader model + Unified memory	128 [256]	576 KB	16	4		LPDDR4X dual-channel 16-bit (32-bit) 2133 MHz (17.0 GB/s) or LPDDR5 dual-channel 16-bit (32-bit) 3200 MHz (25.6 GB/s)							1.3	3.2		3.0			Snapdragon 6 Gen 5	
Adreno 825	Unified shader model + Unified memory	512 [1024]	2 MB	64	4	1150	LPDDR5X quad-channel 16-bit (64-bit) 4800 MHz (76.8 GB/s)		36.8	73.6	588.8	2355.2	4710.4	1.3	3.2		3.0			Snapdragon 8s Gen 4	
Adreno 829	Unified shader model + Unified memory	512 [1024]	2 MB	64	3	1225	LPDDR5X quad-channel 16-bit (64-bit) 4800 MHz (76.8 GB/s)		39.2	78.4	627.2	2505.8	5017.6	1.3	3.2		3.0			Snapdragon 8 Gen 5	
Adreno 830	Unified shader model + Unified memory	512 [1536]	12 MB	96	3	1100; 1200	LPDDR5X quad-channel 16-bit (64-bit) 5300 MHz (84.8 GB/s)		52.8; 57.6	105.6; 115.2	844.8; 921.6	3379.2; 3686.4	6758.4; 7372.8	1.3	3.2		3.0			Snapdragon 8 Elite; Snapdragon 8 Elite for Galaxy	
Adreno 840	Unified shader model + Unified memory	512 [1536]	18 MB	96	3	1200	LPDDR5X quad-channel 16-bit (64-bit) 5300 MHz (84.8 GB/s)		57.6	115.2	921.6	3686.4	7372.8	1.3	3.2		3.0			Snapdragon 8 Elite Gen 5	
Adreno 840	Unified shader model + Unified memory	512 [1536]	18 MB	96	3	1300	LPDDR5X quad-channel 16-bit (64-bit) 5300 MHz (84.8 GB/s)		62.4	124.8	998.4	3993.6	7987.2	1.3	3.2		3.0			Snapdragon 8 Elite Gen 5 for Galaxy	
Adreno 845	Unified shader model + Unified memory	512 [1536]	12 MB	96	2		LPDDR5X quad-channel 16-bit (64-bit) 5300 MHz (84.8 GB/s) or LPDDR6 quad-channel 24-bit (96-bit) 5300 MHz (127.2 GB/s)							1.4	3.2		3.0			Snapdragon 8 Elite Gen 6	
Adreno 850	Unified shader model + Unified memory	512 [1536]	18 MB	96	2	1450	LPDDR5X quad-channel 16-bit (64-bit) 5300 MHz (84.8 GB/s) or LPDDR6 quad-channel 24-bit (96-bit) 5300 MHz (127.2 GB/s)		69.6	139.2	1113.6	4454.4	8908.8	1.4	3.2		3.0			Snapdragon 8 Elite Extreme Gen 6	

=== Adreno A series ===
Name	Microarchitecture				Fab (nm)	Clock [MHz]	Memory technology	Fillrate			GFLOPS			Latest API (version) supported						Qualcomm SoC	Ref.
Name	Type	SIMDs, FP32 (ALUs)	On-chip graphics memory	TMU	Fab (nm)	Clock [MHz]	Memory bandwidth	Triangle [MT/s]	Pixel [GP/s]	Texture [GT/s]	(FP64)	(FP32)	(FP16)	Vulkan	OpenGL ES	OpenVG	OpenCL	OpenGL	Direct3D	Qualcomm SoC	Ref.
Adreno A11	Unified shader model + Unified memory														3.2		2.0			Snapdragon G1 Gen 1	
Adreno A12	Unified shader model + Unified memory	128 [128]			4	1010	LPDDR4X-4266 Dual‑channel 16‑bit (32-bit) @ 2133 MHz (17.0 GB/s) or LPDDR5-6400 Dual‑channel 16‑bit (32-bit) @ 3200 MHz (25.6 GB/s)				64.6	258.6	517.1	1.1	3.2		2.0		12 (feature level 12_1)	Snapdragon G1 Gen 2	
Adreno A21	Unified shader model + Unified memory	256 [256]			4		LPDDR5-6400 Dual‑channel 16‑bit (32-bit) @ 3200 MHz (25.6 GB/s)							1.3	3.2		2.0		12.1	Snapdragon G2 Gen 1	
Adreno A22	Unified shader model + Unified memory	256 [768]		48	4		LPDDR5X-8400 Quad-channel 16-bit (64-bit) @ 4200 MHz (67.2 GB/s)							1.3	3.2	1.2	2.0		12.1	Snapdragon G2 Gen 2	
Adreno A32	Unified shader model + Unified memory	512 [1536]		96	4	1000	LPDDR5X-8400 Quad-channel 16-bit (64-bit) @ 4200 MHz (67.2 GB/s)		48	96	768.0	3072.0	6144.0	1.3	3.2	1.2	2.0		12.1	Snapdragon G3x Gen 2	
Adreno A33	Unified shader model + Unified memory	512 [1536]		96	4		LPDDR5X-9600 Quad-channel 16-bit (64-bit) @ 4800 MHz (76.8 GB/s)							1.3	3.2	1.2	2.0		12.1	Snapdragon G3 Gen 3	

=== Adreno X series ===
- All models support the following APIs: Direct3D 11 & 12_1, OpenCL 3.0, OpenGL ES 3.2 and Vulkan 1.3
- The Adreno X1-45 is internally called the Adreno 726, suggesting it's a scaled-up of the Adreno 725 from the Snapdragon 7+ Gen 2.
- The Adreno X1-85 is internally called the Adreno 741, suggesting it's a scaled-up of the Adreno 730 from the Snapdragon 8 Gen 1.

Name	Microarchitecture						Fab (nm)	Clock [MHz]	Memory technology	Fillrate			GFLOPS			Latest API (version) supported						Qualcomm SoC	Ref.
Name	Type	SIMDs, FP32 (ALUs)	# of Shader processors, (# of FP32 operation units per SP)	On-chip graphics memory (MB)	TMU	ROP	Fab (nm)	Clock [MHz]	Memory bandwidth	Triangle [MT/s]	Pixel [GP/s]	Texture [GT/s]	(FP64)	(FP32)	(FP16)	Vulkan	OpenGL ES	OpenVG	OpenCL	OpenGL	Direct3D	Qualcomm SoC	Ref.
Adreno X1-45	Unified shader model + Unified memory	256 [768]	6 (128)	9	48	24	TSMC N4	1107; 1367	LPDDR5X-8448 or 8533 Octa-channel 16-bit (128-bit) @ 4224 or 4266.5 MHz (135.1 or 136.5 GB/s)	1107; 1367	26.6; 32.8	53.1; 65.6	425; 525	1700 2100	3400 4200	1.3	3.2	N/A	3.0	N/A	11; 12.1	Snapdragon X X1-26; Snapdragon X Plus X1P-42/46-100	
Adreno X1-85	Unified shader model + Unified memory	512 [1536]	12 (128)	18	96	48	TSMC N4	1250 1500	LPDDR5X-8448 or 8533 Octa-channel 16-bit (128-bit) @ 4224 or 4266.5 MHz (135.1 or 136.5 GB/s)	2500; 3000	60; 72	120; 144	960 1152	3840 4608	7680 9216	1.3	3.2	N/A	3.0	N/A	11; 12.1	Snapdragon X Plus X1P-64-100; Snapdragon X Elite X1E-78/80/84-100, 00-1DE	
Adreno X2-45	Unified shader model + Unified memory						TSMC N3P+N3X	900	LPDDR5X-9523 Octa-channel 16-bit (128-bit) @ 4761.5 MHz (152 GB/s)							1.4	3.2	N/A	3.0	N/A	12.2	Snapdragon X2 Plus; X2-42-100	
Adreno X2-45	Unified shader model + Unified memory						TSMC N3P+N3X	1700	LPDDR5X-9523 Octa-channel 16-bit (128-bit) @ 4761.5 MHz (152 GB/s)							1.4	3.2	N/A	3.0	N/A	12.2	Snapdragon X2 Plus; X2-64-100	
Adreno X2-85	Unified shader model + Unified memory						TSMC N3P+N3X	1350	LPDDR5X-9523 Octa-channel 16-bit (128-bit) @ 4761.5 MHz (152 GB/s)							1.4	3.2	N/A	3.0	N/A	12.2	Snapdragon X2 Elite; X2-78-100	
Adreno X2-85	Unified shader model + Unified memory						TSMC N3P+N3X	1700	LPDDR5X-9523 Octa-channel 16-bit (128-bit) @ 4761.5 MHz (152 GB/s)							1.4	3.2	N/A	3.0	N/A	12.2	Snapdragon X2 Elite; X2-80-100; Snapdragon X2 Elite Extreme X2E-84-100	
Adreno X2-90	Unified shader model + Unified memory	512 [2048]	16 (128)	21	128	64	TSMC N3P+N3X	1700	LPDDR5X-9523 Octa-channel 16-bit (128-bit) @ 4761.5 MHz (152 GB/s) or LPDDR5X-9523 Dodeca-channel 16-bit (192-bit) @ 4761.5 MHz (228 GB/s)	6800	108.8	217.6	1740.8	6963.2	13926.4	1.4	3.2	N/A	3.0	N/A	12.2	Snapdragon X2 Elite X2E-88-100; Snapdragon X2 Elite Extreme X2E-90-100	
Adreno X2-90	Unified shader model + Unified memory	512 [2048]	16 (128)	21	128	64	TSMC N3P+N3X	1850	LPDDR5X-9523 Octa-channel 16-bit (128-bit) @ 4761.5 MHz (152 GB/s) or LPDDR5X-9523 Dodeca-channel 16-bit (192-bit) @ 4761.5 MHz (228 GB/s)	7400	118.4	236.8	1894.4	7577.6	15155.2	1.4	3.2	N/A	3.0	N/A	12.2	Snapdragon X2 Elite X2E-94-100; Snapdragon X2 Elite Extreme X2E-96-100	

Notes

- Adreno 130 inside the MSM7x01, and MSM7x01A. It supports OpenGL ES 1.1, OpenVG 1.1, EGL 1.3, Direct3D Mobile, SVGT 1.2, Direct Draw and GDI.
- Adreno 200 (AMD Z430) inside the QSD8x50 and MSM7x27 (133 MHz). It offers a programmable function pipeline and streaming textures with support for OpenGL ES 1.0, OpenGL ES 1.1, OpenVG 1.1, EGL 1.4, Direct3D Mobile, SVGT 1.2 and DirectDraw. (22M triangles/second, 133M pixels/second, clock speed up to 133 MHz)
- Adreno 200 enhanced inside the MSM7x25A and MSM7x27A (200 MHz). It supports OpenGL ES 2.0, OpenGL ES 1.1, OpenVG 1.1, EGL 1.4, Direct3D Mobile, SVGT 1.2, Direct Draw and GDI. (40M triangles/second, 200M pixels/second, clock speed up to 200 MHz)
- Adreno 203 inside the MSM8225 and MSM8225Q (400 MHz). It is an improvement over Adreno 205. It features a higher frequency, has better pixel fillrate, lower power consumption, better 3D performance. It is about 50-100% faster than Adreno 200 (enhanced), and 10–25% than Adreno 205. It could clock 2x times higher than Adreno 205. It supports OpenGL ES 2.0, OpenGL ES 1.1, OpenVG 1.1, EGL 1.4, Direct3D Mobile, DirectX 9.0c, SVGT 1.2, Direct Draw and GDI. (42-50M triangles/second, 250-300M pixels/second, clock speed from 192 to 400 MHz)
- Adreno 205 inside the QSD8x50A, MSM7x30, and MSM8x55 (245 MHz). Its improvements include Hardware-accelerated SVG and Adobe Flash and better shader-performance than the Adreno 200. It supports OpenGL ES 2.0, OpenGL ES 1.1, OpenVG 1.1, EGL 1.4, Direct3D Mobile, SVGT 1.2, Direct Draw and GDI. (57M triangles/second, 250M pixels/second, clock speed up to 400 MHz)
- Adreno 220 inside the MSM8660 or MSM8260 (266 MHz) with single channel memory. It supports OpenGL ES 2.0, OpenGL ES 1.1, OpenVG 1.1, EGL 1.4, Direct3D Mobile, DirectX 9.0c, SVGT 1.2, Direct Draw and GDI. (88M triangles/second, 500M pixels/second, standard clock speed up to 266 MHz, overclock up to 400 MHz)
- Adreno 225 inside the MSM8960 (400 MHz), with unified shader architecture and dual channel memory. It supports Direct3D 9.0c in addition to OpenGL ES 2.0, OpenGL ES 1.1, OpenVG 1.1, EGL 1.4, Direct3D Mobile, SVGT 1.2, Direct Draw and GDI.
- Adreno 320 inside the Qualcomm S4 Pro & Prime Series, with unified shader architecture and dual channel memory. It supports Direct3D feature level 9_3 in addition to OpenGL ES 3.0, OpenGL ES 2.0, OpenGL ES 1.1, OpenVG 1.1, EGL 1.4, Direct3D Mobile, SVGT 1.2
- Adreno 330 inside the Nexus 5, Amazon Kindle HDX series tablets, Amazon Fire phone, Nokia Lumia 2520 tablet, Nokia Lumia 1520, Nokia Lumia Icon, Nokia Lumia 930, Samsung Galaxy S5, Samsung Galaxy Note 3, Sony Xperia Z1, Sony Xperia Z1 Compact, Sony Xperia Z2, Sony Xperia Z3, Sony Xperia Z3 Compact, Sony Xperia Z Ultra, Xiaomi Mi3, Xiaomi Mi4, OnePlus One, HTC One (M8) and LG G2/G3 smartphones.
- Adreno 420 inside the Qualcomm Snapdragon 805 supports Direct3D 11.2 runtime (feature level 11_1). Inside the Google Nexus 6, Samsung Galaxy S5 LTE-A, Samsung Galaxy Note 4, Samsung Galaxy Note Edge, LG G3 Cat. 6, Amazon Fire HDX 8.9 (2014). The Qualcomm Snapdragon 805 is the first phone SoC ever to feature a 128-bit memory bus.
- Adreno 540 inside the Qualcomm Snapdragon 835 is the first phone SoC to feature variable refresh rate and foveated rendering/Variate Rate Shading, Qualcomm calls their implementations Q-Sync and Adreno Foveation.
- Adreno 630 inside the Qualcomm Snapdragon 845 is the first phone SoC to feature Inside-Out Room-scale 6DoF with SLAM.
- Adreno 640 inside the Qualcomm Snapdragon 855 is the first phone SoC to feature updateable GPU drivers from the Google Play Store.

=== Operating system support ===
There are proprietary drivers for the Linux-based mobile operating system Android available from Qualcomm themselves. Historically the only way to have GPU support on non-Android Linux was with the libhybris wrapper.

Linux and Mesa supports the Adreno 200/300/400/500 series of GPUs with a driver called freedreno. Freedreno allows fully open-source graphics on devices like the 96Boards Dragonboard 410c and Nexus 7 (2013).

Qualcomm also provides Adreno drivers for ARM64 versions of Microsoft Windows.

Since Linux kernel 6.11, the mainline Linux kernel has added Adreno drivers for Qualcomm Snapdragon X system-on-a-chips.

== See also ==
- Qualcomm Hexagon
- List of Qualcomm Snapdragon processors
- PowerVR – competing graphics technology available as a Silicon IP core (SIP) to 3rd parties
- Mali – competing graphics technology available as a Silicon IP core (SIP) to 3rd parties
- Vivante – competing graphics technology available as a Silicon IP core (SIP) to 3rd parties
- Tegra – family of SoCs for mobile computers, the graphics core could be available as SIP block to 3rd parties
- VideoCore – family of SOCs, by Broadcom, for mobile computers, the graphics core could be available as SIP block to 3rd parties
- Atom family of SoCs – with Intel graphics core, not licensed to 3rd parties
- AMD mobile APUs – with AMD graphics core, not licensed to 3rd parties
- AMD Imageon (ATI Imageon) - List of ATI mobile GPU
- Intel 2700G - Old Intel mobile GPU
- List of Nvidia graphics processing units - GPU Nvidia
- Apple M1
- Qualcomm VPU (Video Processing Unit)
