= Vivante Corporation =

American fabless semiconductor company

- Founded: 2004; 22 years ago
- Headquarters: Sunnyvale, California, United States
- Products: Semiconductor intellectual property
- Parent: VeriSilicon Holdings Co., Ltd.
- Website: verisilicon.com/en/IPPortfolio/VivanteGPUIP

Vivante Corporation was a fabless semiconductor company headquartered in Sunnyvale, California, with an R&D center in Shanghai, China. The company was founded in 2004 as GiQuila and focused on the portable gaming market. The company's first product was a DirectX-compatible graphics processing unit (GPU) capable of playing PC games. In 2007, GiQuila changed its name to Vivante and shifted the direction of the company to the design and licensing of embedded graphics processing unit designs. The company licensed its Mobile Visual Reality to semiconductor solution providers, serving embedded computing markets for mobile gaming, high-definition home entertainment, image processing, and automotive display and entertainment.

Vivante used to be named as a contributor to the HSA (Heterogeneous System Architecture) Foundation.

In 2015, VeriSilicon Holdings Co., Ltd. acquired Vivante Corporation in an all-stock transaction.

== Products ==
After its business pivot, Vivante developed a range of GPU cores that are compliant with the OpenGL ES 1.1 and 2.0 standards as well as the OpenVG standard. Created by VeriSilicon support for the Vulkan API 1.0 and for OpenVX 1.0 is provided for at least 6 major desktop and embedded operating systems.

2D graphics products & Vector GPUs, summarized by the vendor under the term "Composition Processing Cores" (CPC), sometimes mentioned with the feature of single pass composition blending capability of 8 or higher, are the GC300, GC320, GC350 and GP355 (OpenVG core)with the additional listing of GC200 and GC420. NXP further mentions GC255 in a presentation for its i.MX models. The NXP i.MX8 series will come with 2 units of the GC7000Lite or GC7000 vector processor. For 3D graphics products please see the table below.

Legend for the notes in below listing:

- Pipelined FP/INT double (64-bit), single/high (32-bit) and half precision/medium (16-bit) precision IEEE formats for GPU Compute and HDR graphics, Source:

Series	Model	Date	Shader Cores SP/Half (mode)	Silicon area (mm^{2})	Core Clock Max in MHz	Shader Clock Max in MHz	Fillrate				Bus width (bit)	API (version)					Shader GFLOPS (High=SP / Medium=Half)	Usage
Series	Model	Date	Shader Cores SP/Half (mode)	Silicon area (mm^{2})	Core Clock Max in MHz	Shader Clock Max in MHz	M triangles/s	G vertices/s	(GP/s)	(GT/s)	Bus width (bit)	OpenGL ES	OpenVG	OpenCL	OpenGL	Direct3D	Shader GFLOPS (High=SP / Medium=Half)	Usage
GCNano	GCNano Lite		1 (VEC-4)	0.3 @ 28 nm	100–200 @ 28HPM	100–200 @ 28HPM	40	0.1	0.2			N/A	1.1	N/A	N/A	N/A	3.2?	
GCNano	GCNano		1 (VEC-4)	0.5 @ 28 nm	200 @ 28HPM	200 @ 28HPM	40	0.1	0.2			2.0	1.1	N/A			3.2	STM32MP157
GCNano Ultra (Vega-Lite)	GCNano Ultra		1 (VEC-4)	1 @ 28 nm	400 @ 28HPM	800 @ 28HPM	80	0.2	0.4			2.0	1.1	1.2 optional			6.4	NXP i.MX8M Mini
GCNano Ultra (Vega-Lite)	GCNano Ultra3		1 (VEC-4)	1.6 @ 28 nm	400 @ 28HPM	800 @ 28HPM	80	0.2	0.4?			3.0	1.1	1.2 optional			6.4?	
GC200	GC200			0.57 @ 65 nm	250 @ 65nmLP; 375 @ 65nmG+				0.375		32/16	—N/a	1.1	—N/a	—N/a	—N/a		Jz4760
GC400	GC400		1 (VEC-4); 4 (VEC-1)	1.4; 2 @ 65 nm	250 @ 65nmLP; 375 @ 65nmG+		19	0.094	0.188		32/16	2.0	1.1	1.1 EP	—N/a	11	3	NXP i.MX6 SoloX: GC400T
GC400	GC500										32/16	2.0	1.1					PXA920: GC530
GC600	GC600		1 (VEC-4); 4 (VEC-1)								32/16	2.0	1.1	1.2/1.1	3.0/2.1	11		CuBox
GC800	GC800		1 (VEC-4); 4 (VEC-1)	2.5; 3.38 @ 65 nm	800 @ 28HPM; 250 @ 65nmLP; 375 @ 65nmG+	1000 @ 28HPM	38 @ 65nmG+	0.188 @ 65nmG+	0.375 @ 65nmG+		32/16	3.0	1.1	1.2 optional	3.0/2.1	11	8 / 16	RK291x, ATM7013, ATM7019
GC800	GC860		1 (VEC-4); 4 (VEC-1)	? @ 65nm	444		35		0.3		32/16	3.0	1.1	1.2 optional	3.0/2.1	11		Jz4770: GCW Zero NOVO7
GC800	GC880		1 (VEC-4); 4 (VEC-1)				35	0.1	0.266		32/16	3.0	1.1	1.2 optional	3.0/2.1	11	3.2	NXP i.MX6 Solo and DualLite
GCx000	GC1000 (Vega-Lite)		2 (VEC-4); 8 (VEC-1)	3.5; 4.26 @ 65 nm	800 @ 28HPM; 500 @ 65nmLP; 750 @ 65nmG+	1000 @ 28HPM	123; 58 @ 65nmG+	0.5; 0.375 @ 65nmG+	0.8; 0.75 @ 65nmG+		32/16	3.0	1.1	1.2 optional	3.0/2.1	11	16	ATM7029: GC1000+, Marvell PXA986, PXA988, PXA1088
GCx000	GC2000		4 (VEC-4); 16 (VEC-1)	6.9	800 @ 28HPM	1000 @ 28HPM	267	1	1.6		32/16	3.0	1.1	1.2	3.0/2.1	11	32	NXP i.MX6 Dual and Quad
GCx000	GC4000		8 (VEC-4); 32 (VEC-1)	12.4	800 @ 28HPM	1000 @ 28HPM	267	2	1.6		8	3.0	1.1	1.2	3.0/2.1	11	64	HiSilicon K3V2
Vega xX	GC3000 (Vega 1X)		4/8 (VEC-4); 16/32 (VEC-1)		800 @ 28HPM	1000 @ 28HPM	267	1	1.6		8/4	3.0	1.1	1.2	3.0/2.1	11	32 / 64	NXP S32V234
Vega xX	GC5000 (Vega 2X)		8/16 (VEC-4); 32/64 (VEC-1)		800 @ 28HPM	1000 @ 28HPM	267	1	1.6		32/16	3.0	1.1	1.2	3.0/2.1	11	64 / 128	Marvell PXA1928
Vega xX	GC6000 (Vega 4X); GC6400?		16/32 (VEC-4); 64/128 (VEC-1)		800 @ 28HPM	1000 @ 28HPM	533	4	3.2		32/16	3.0	1.1	1.2	3.0/2.1	11	128 / 256	
GC7000 (Vega 8X)	GC7000 UltraLite; GC1500?		8 Vega					0.5		0.8	32/16	3.0	1.1	1.2	3.0/2.1	11	16 / 32	Marvell PXA1908NXP i.MX8M Nano
GC7000 (Vega 8X)	GC7000 Lite; GC7000L?		16 Vega					1		1.6	32/16	3.0	1.1	1.2	3.0/2.1	11	32 / 64	Marvel PXA1936; NXP i.MX 8QuadPlus; NXP i.MX 8Quad NXP i.MX8M
GC7000 (Vega 8X)	GC7000		32 Vega		800 @ 28HPM	1000 @ 28HPM	1067	2	6.4	3.2	32/16	3.0	1.1	1.2	3.0/2.1	11	64 / 128	NXP i.MX 8QuadMax
GC7000 (Vega 8X)	GC7200		64 Vega					4		6.4	32/16	3.0	1.1	1.2	3.0/2.1	11	128 / 256	
GC7000 (Vega 8X)	GC7400		128 Vega					8		12.8	32/16	3.0	1.1	1.2	3.0/2.1	11	256 / 512	
GC7000 (Vega 8X)	GC7600		256 Vega					16		25.6	32/16	3.0	1.1	1.2	3.0/2.1	11	512 / 1024	
GC8000	GC8000											3.0	1.1	1.2				
Series	Model	Date	Shader Cores SP/Half (mode)	Silicon area (mm^{2})	Core Clock Max in MHz	Shader Clock Max in MHz	Fillrate				Bus width (bit)	API (version)					Shader GFLOPS (High=SP / Medium=Half)	Usage
Series	Model	Date	Shader Cores SP/Half (mode)	Silicon area (mm^{2})	Core Clock Max in MHz	Shader Clock Max in MHz	M triangles/s	G vertices/s	(GP/s)	(GT/s)	Bus width (bit)	OpenGL ES	OpenVG	OpenCL	OpenGL	Direct3D	Shader GFLOPS (High=SP / Medium=Half)	Usage

== Adoption ==
They announced that as of 2009 they have at least fifteen licensees who have used their GPUs in twenty embedded designs. Application processors using Vivante GPU technology:

- Marvell ARMADA range of SoCs
- NXP / Freescale i.MX Series
- Ingenic Semiconductor Jz4770
- ICT Godson-2H
- Rockchip RK2918
- Actions Semiconductor ATM7029
- HiSilicon K3V2
- InfoTM iMAP×210

== GC8000 Series ==
After Vivante was sold to VeriSilicon the Arcturus GC8000 series was released by VeriSilicon, which supports newer technologies such as OpenCL 3.0, OpenVX 1.2, OpenVG 1.1, OpenGL ES 3.2, OpenGL 4.0 and Vulkan 1.1.

== Linux support ==
There are no plans on writing a new DRM/KMS driver kernel driver for the Vivante hardware, since Vivante previously put out its Linux kernel component under the GNU General Public License (GPL), instead of maintaining it as a proprietary blob. The free Gallium3D-style device driver etna_viv has surpassed Vivante's own proprietary user-space driver in some benchmarks. It supports Vivante's product line of GC400 Series, GC800 Series, GC1000 Series, GC2000 Series, GC3000 Series, GC4000 Series, and GC7000lite.

== See also ==
- PowerVR – available as SIP block to 3rd parties
- Mali – available as SIP block to 3rd parties
- Adreno – found only on Qualcomm Snapdragon, could be available as SIP block to 3rd parties
- Tegra – family of SoCs for mobile computers, the graphics core could be available as SIP block to 3rd parties
- Atom family of SoCs – with Intel graphics core, not licensed to 3rd parties
- AMD mobile APUs – with AMD graphics core, not licensed to 3rd parties
