= Ainol =

Chinese electronics manufacturer

Shenzhen Ainol Electronics Co., Ltd.
- Type: Private
- Industry: Consumer electronics
- Founded: 2004
- Headquarters: Lijincheng Industry Park, Shenzhen, Guangdong, People's Republic of China
- Area served: Worldwide
- Products: Android tablet computers, MP3 players, MP4 players, Digital photo frames
- Number of employees: approx. 300
- Website: www.ainol.com (in Chinese)

Shenzhen Ainol Electronics Co., Ltd. (Chinese: 深圳艾诺电子有限公司) was a Chinese consumer electronics manufacturing and distribution company headquartered in Shenzhen, Guangdong, China. It specialises in Android tablets and phablets. The company principally sells its products under the Ainol brand, but also offers OEM production under other brand names. The company was founded in 2004. Its slogan is "Enjoy life. Enjoy ainol".

== Products ==
In December 2011 Ainol launched the world's first Android 4.0 Ice Cream Sandwich tablet called NOVO7 and was marketed with the brand name Ainovo for the United States, Europe and worldwide market.

The Ainol NOVO10 Hero II tablet released in 2012 is a quad-core ARM Cortex-A5 system based on the Actions Semiconductor ATM7029 (also called gs702a) SoC, and a 10.1 inch display.

In 2014, Ainol introduced the "Numy" product line of phablets with 3G.
