= NOVO7 =

Line of Android tablets made by Ainol

- Manufacturer: Ainol Electronics Co
- Type: Tablet computer
- Lifespan: 2011 to 2012
- Operating system: Android v4.0.4 (Ice Cream Sandwich)
- CPU: 1 GHz Ingenic JZ4770, MIPS-based or 1.2 GHz Allwinner A10 ARM-based
- Memory: 512 MB or 1GB RAM
- Storage: Flash memory Internal: 8 or 16 GB flash External: miniSDHC card
- Display: 800 × 480 px, 1024 × 600 or 1280 × 800 px 7 in (18 cm) diagonal capacitive touchscreen
- Sound: Built-in microphone; Built-in speaker; 3.5 mm stereo jack
- Input: Multi-touch Capacitive Touchscreen
- Camera: None or 2.0 Megapixel
- Connectivity: Wi-Fi (802.11 b/g/n), miniUSB
- Power: 3700 or 5000 mAh Li-Po battery
- Website: www.ainovo.com

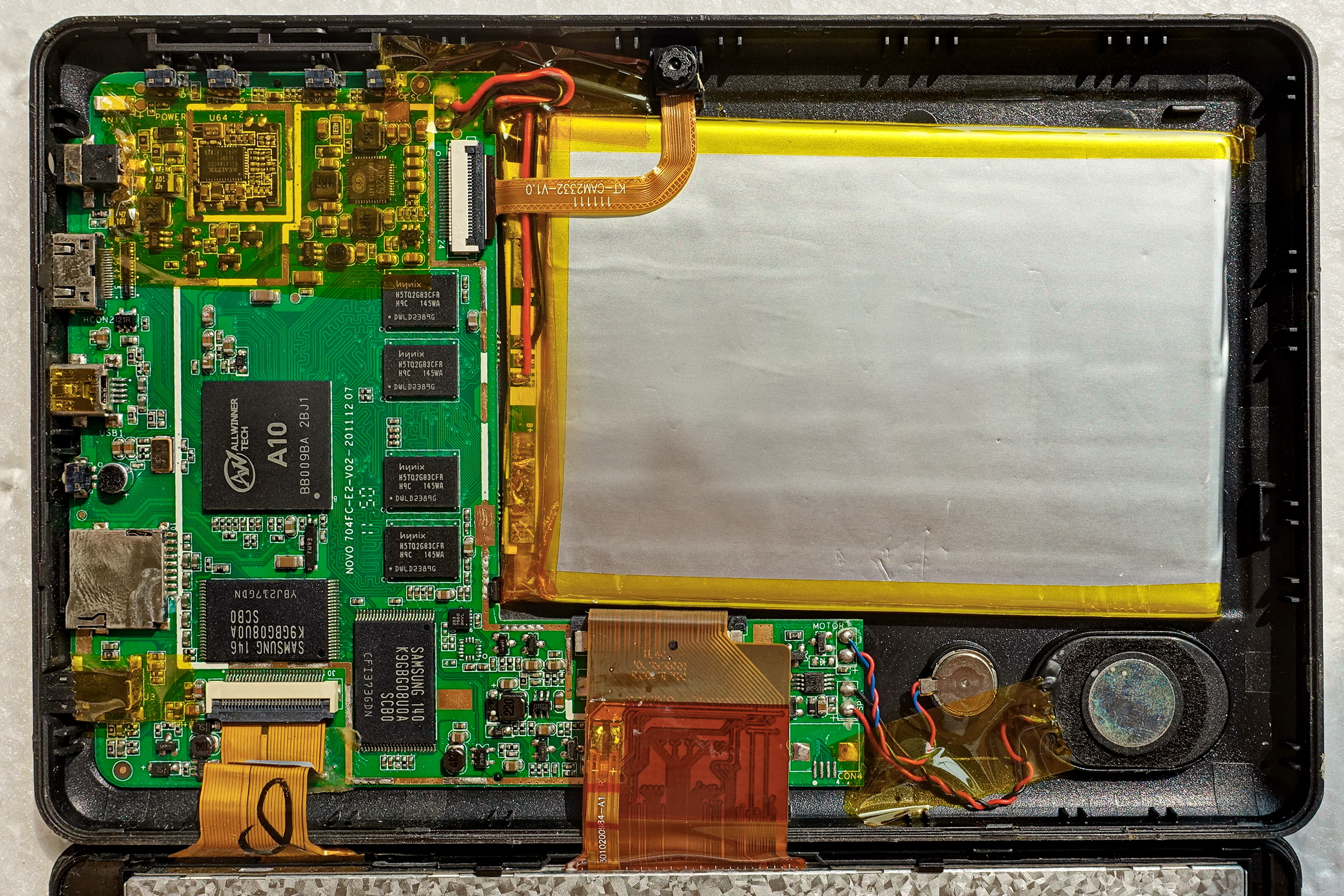
The internal components of an Ainol NOVO7 Elf tablet computer.

The NOVO7 is a series of Android tablet computers manufactured by the Chinese company Ainol Electronics. The "7" represents the size of the tablet's screen (7 inches); Ainol's other products include the Novo 5 and Novo 8.

== History ==
The first tablets in the Novo 7 line were the Novo 7 Basic and Novo 7 Advanced, released in early 2011. Unlike most competing tablets, the Novo 7 Basic used a MIPS-based CPU (1 GHz Ingenic JZ4770 XBurst), while the Advanced had a more common ARM CPU. Both had 800x480-pixel touchscreens and were launched with Android 2.2; although the company later released updates to Android 3 and Android 4.

The company released the Novo 7 Paladin in late 2011, which became the world's first Android 4.0 (Ice Cream Sandwich) tablet. Its specifications were similar to the Novo 7 Basic, featuring a 7-inch touchscreen, a 1 GHz MIPS processor, 512 MB of RAM, 8 to 16 GB of internal flash storage, an external microSDHC slot, a mini USB port, and Wi-Fi (802.11 b/g/n). Two more tablets, the Aurora and the Elf, were added to the selection soon afterward, both using ARM CPUs.

Ainol's latest Novo 7 tablets are the Tornado, Mars, Elf II, and Aurora II. These all feature ARM processors, 8GB of internal storage—except for the Elf II, which also has a 16 GB model, and the Aurora II, which comes only in a 16 GB model—and 7-inch screens. The main difference between the models is the CPU speed and screen resolution. The Tornado has a 1 GHz single-core processor and an 800x480 screen, the Mars has the same processor but a 1024x600 pixel screen, and the Elf II/Aurora II has a dual-core 1.5 GHz processor (currently limited to 1.32 GHz) with a 1024x600 screen.

All Novo 7 models are budget tablets with lower specifications than others released at the same time, and thus are priced at a more affordable price. They all support Wi-Fi, but none have built-in 3G support.

In August 2012, Ainol released a new flagship tablet, the Novo 7 Fire / Flame. The Novo 7 Fire / Flame includes a high-resolution 1280×800 IPS display with a 5-point capacitive multi-touchscreen, along with full HD 1080p support. It has 16 GB of memory and 1 GB of RAM, runs on the Android 4.0.4 Ice Cream Sandwich operating system, offers official access to Google Play, and features a 1.5 GHz AMLogic ARM 2nd generation Cortex-A9 based dual-core CPU. In terms of external interfaces, it contains a micro SD storage card slot, an HDMI port, a micro-USB port, Wi-Fi, Bluetooth wireless connection, and 3G access through an external dongle USB device. It has two cameras: a 5 MP rear-facing camera with AF and auto flash, and a 2 MP front-facing webcam. It also supports hardware-accelerated Flash (access to Flash-based video), features a 3-axis gravity sensor, and contains a 5000 mAh battery.

In September 2012, Ainol announced the release of the Novo 7 Crystal with the latest Android 4.1.1 Jelly Bean. The tablet was released for shipment on 28 September. The Novo 7 Crystal surpasses the specifications of the Novo 7 Elf II and looks to replace its predecessor. It has a special 7-inch MVA screen with 1024×600 pixel resolution and a wide 170° viewing angle.

== Software ==
=== Android operating system ===
On 28 March 2012, Ainol released updates to Android 4.0.3 v1.0 (Ice Cream Sandwich) for the NOVO7 series. It fixes most of the bugs for [v4.0.3 v0.9] firmware that was released on 7 March 2012.

=== Community support ===
Some users are attempting to hack and create scripts to enhance the compatibility of the NOVO7 tablets.

At least two ports of CyanogenMod 9 (Android 4.0.4) have been made.

== Specifications ==
(Note: no GPS )

=== NOVO7 Devices Table ===
Model	NOVO7 Paladin	NOVO7 Legend	NOVO7 Elf	NOVO7 Aurora	NOVO7 Advanced II	NOVO7 Tornado	NOVO7 Mars	NOVO7 Elf II	NOVO7 Aurora II	NOVO7 Fire	NOVO7 Crystal
Display size:	7-inch	7-inch	7-inch	7-inch	7-inch	7-inch	7-inch	7-inch	7-inch	7-inch	7-inch
Display pixels:	800 × 480	800 × 600	1024 × 600	1024 × 600	800 × 480	800 × 480	1024 × 600	1024 × 600	1024 × 600	1280 × 800	1024 × 600
Display type:	TN	TN	TN	IPS TN	TN	TN	TN	TN	IPS	IPS	IPS
CPU:	1 GHz, Ingenic JZ4770, MIPS-based	1 GHz, Allwinner A13, Single-Core-ARM-based	1.2 GHz, Allwinner A10, ARM-based	1.2 GHz, Allwinner A10, ARM-based	1.2 GHz, Allwinner A10, ARM-based	1 GHz, AML8726-M3 Cortex-A9; ARM-based	1 GHz, AML8726-M3 Cortex-A9; ARM-based	1.5 GHz, AML8726-M6 Cortex-A9; Dual-Core-ARM	1.5 GHz, AML8726-M6 Cortex-A9; Dual-Core-ARM	1.5 GHz, AML8726-MX Cortex-A9; Dual-Core-ARM	1.5 GHz, AML8726-M6 Cortex-A9; Dual-Core-ARM
GPU:	GC860	MALI-400	MALI-400	MALI-400	MALI-400	MALI-400	MALI-400 3D	MALI-400x2	MALI-400x2	MALI-400x4	MALI-400x2
RAM:	512 MB DDR2	512 MB DDR3	1 GB DDR3	1 GB DDR3	512 MB DDR3	1 GB DDR3	1 GB DDR3	1 GB DDR3	1 GB DDR3	1 GB DDR3	1 GB DDR3
Internal storage:	8 / 16 GB flash	8 GB flash	8 GB flash	8 / 16 GB flash	8 GB flash	8 / 16 GB flash	8 GB flash	8 / 16 GB flash	16 GB flash	16 GB flash	8 GB flash
External storage:	microSDHC card	microSDHC card	microSDHC card	microSDHC card	microSDHC card	microSDHC card	microSDHC card	microSDHC card	microSDHC card	microSDHC card	microSDHC card
Camera:	None	0.3 Megapixel (front)	2.0 Megapixel (front)	2.0 Megapixel (front)	2.0 Megapixel (front)	0.3 Megapixel (front)	0.3 Megapixel (front)	2.0 Megapixel (front)	2.0 Megapixel (front)	2.0 MP (front), 5.0 MP (back)	2.0 Megapixel (front)
Video out:	None	None	Mini-HDMI	Mini-HDMI	Mini-HDMI	None	None	Mini-HDMI	Mini-HDMI	Mini-HDMI	Mini-HDMI
Wireless:	WiFi (802.11 b/g/n)	WiFi (802.11 b/g/n)	WiFi (802.11 b/g/n)	WiFi (802.11 b/g/n)	WiFi (802.11 b/g/n)	WiFi (802.11 b/g/n)	WiFi (802.11 b/g/n)	WiFi (802.11 b/g/n)	WiFi (802.11 b/g/n)	WiFi (802.11 b/g/n), Bluetooth v2.1 HSP/HFP/A2DP/AVRCP supported	WiFi (802.11 b/g/n)
Wired:	miniUSB (supports OTG), 3.5 mm jack (audio)	miniUSB (supports OTG), 3.5 mm jack (audio)	miniUSB (supports OTG), 3.5 mm jack (audio)	miniUSB, 3.5 mm jack (audio)	miniUSB, 3.5 mm jack (audio)	miniUSB, 3.5 mm jack (audio)	miniUSB, 3.5 mm jack (audio)	miniUSB, 3.5 mm jack (audio)	miniUSB, 3.5 mm jack (audio)	microUSB, 3.5 mm jack (audio)	microUSB, 3.5 mm jack (audio)
G-Sensor(Gravity sensor):	3 way	4 way	3 way	3 way	3 way	3 way	3 way	3 way	3 way	3 way	3 way
Battery:	4000 mAh lithium-ion polymer	3700 mAh lithium-ion polymer	3700 mAh lithium-ion polymer	3700 mAh lithium-ion polymer	3700 mAh lithium-ion polymer	3700 mAh lithium-ion polymer	3700 mAh lithium-ion polymer	3700 mAh lithium-ion polymer	3700 mAh lithium-ion polymer	5000 mAh lithium-ion polymer	3700 mAh lithium-ion polymer
Size:	176 × 110 × 13.2mm	190 × 120 × 12mm	189.3 × 120 × 11.2mm	189.5 × 122.66 × 9.9mm	187 × 111 × 12mm	187 × 111 × 12mm	191 × 125 × 10.9mm	189.3 × 120 × 11.2mm	186 × 120 × 11.9mm	186.6 × 126.93 × 10.6mm	189.3 × 120.93 × 11.2mm
Weight:	420g	360g	360g	313g	320g	336g	360g	333g	342g	336g	328g

Notes for NOVO7 Crystal

While it is advertised as 1.5 GHz, the actual CPU speed is only 1.2 GHz. Verified on stock ROM (batch 3, chengnen.tan kernel).

== See also ==
- Android (operating system)
- Android version history
- List of Android devices
- Ingenic Semiconductor
- MIPS architecture
- Comparison of tablet computers
- Ainol
