= Actions Technology =

Chinese fabless semiconductor company

Actions Technology Co. Ltd.
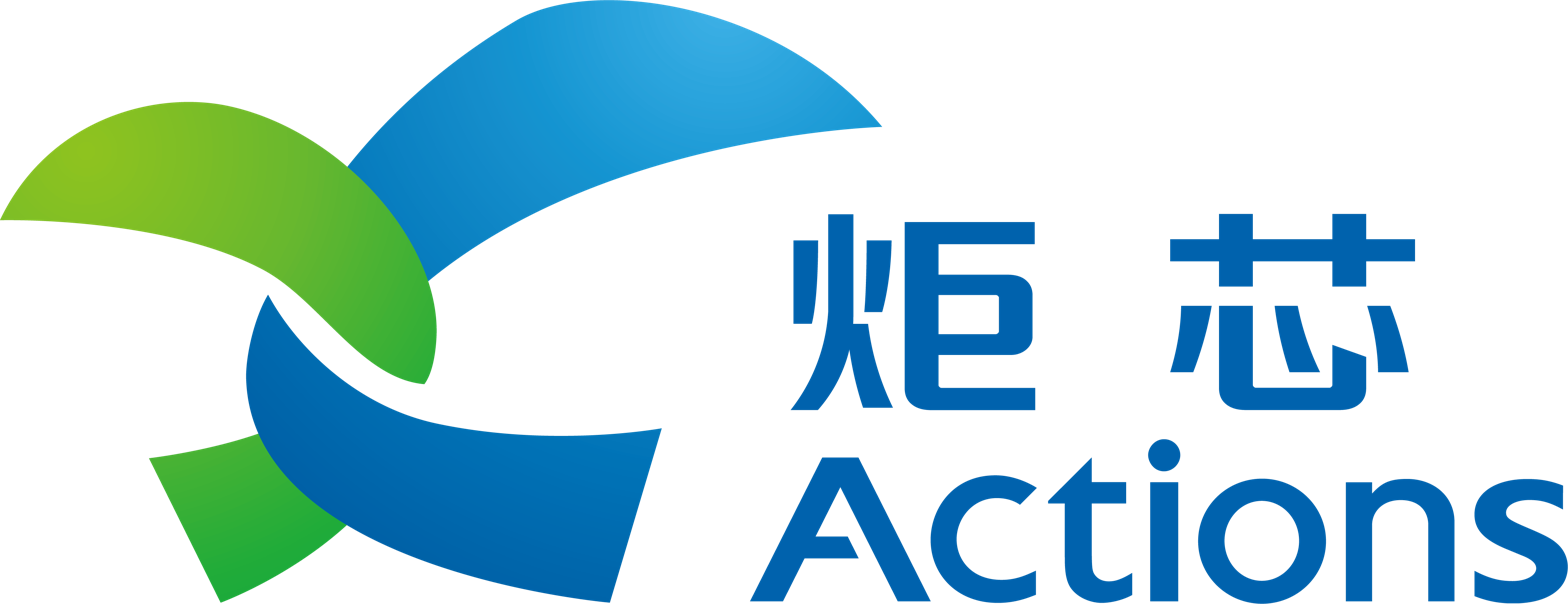
- Native name: 炬力集成电路设计有限公司
- Company type: Private
- Traded as: Nasdaq: ACTS
- Industry: Semiconductors
- Founded: 2000; 26 years ago
- Headquarters: Zhuhai, Guangdong, China
- Area served: Worldwide
- Products: SoCs (ATMxxxx)
- Owner: Starman Limited
- Website: actions-semi.com

Actions Technology Co. Ltd. (Chinese: 炬力集成; pinyin: Jùlì Jíchéng) is a Chinese fabless semiconductor company founded in 2000 and headquartered in Zhuhai, Guangdong province and has offices in both Shanghai and Shenzhen. The company has about 600 employees and designs SoCs for tablets, digital audio players, photo viewers and related products.

== History ==
In 2008 Actions Semiconductor acquired Hi-Trend Technology Co. Ltd's 2D graphics technology. The company acquired Mavrix technology in 2010. In November 2011, Niccolo Chen stepped down as CEO, and was replaced by Zhenyu Zhou who was Senior Vice President at the time, and was the founder of Mavrix in 2005. On 12 September 2016, Actions Semiconductor announced its merger with Starman Limited, which was completed on 9 December 2016.

== Products ==
The following is a list of system-on-chips developed and marketed by Actions Semiconductor, mainly targeting tablets.

| Model Number | Application | Process | CPU | | | | Memory interface | GPU | Availability |
| Model Number | Application | Process | ISA | Processor | # of Cores | Frq (GHz) | Memory interface | GPU | Availability |
|---|---|---|---|---|---|---|---|---|---|
| ATM7013 | Tablet | ? | MIPS | 74Kf | 1 | 1.1 | 8/16-bit DDR3 | Vivante GC800 | |
| ATM7019 | Tablet | ? | MIPS | 74Kf | 1 | 1.2 | 8/16-bit DDR3 | Vivante GC800 | |
| ATM7021A | Tablet | ? | ARMv7-A | Cortex-A9 family (Note: The term "Cortex-A9 family" used by Actions is similar to the description used by the company for the CPU cores inside the ATM7029, which have been proven to be Cortex-A5 cores. The ARM Cortex-A5 would be more be accurately described as being "Cortex-A7 family", being slower than but otherwise equivalent to the ARM Cortex-A7, rather than being directly related to the higher-performance ARM Cortex-A9.) | 2 | Up to 1.3 | DDR3/DDR3L (512 MB) | PowerVR SGX540 @ 500 MHz | Q3 2013 |
| ATM7029 | Tablet | ? | ARMv7-A | Cortex-A5 | 4 | Up to 1.2 | 456 MHz DDR2/DDR3, up to 2 GB | Vivante GC1000 Plus @ 480 MHz | Q4 2012 |
| ATM7029B | Tablet | ? | ARMv7-A | Cortex-A5 | 4 | 1.2 | ? | PowerVR SGX540 @ 500 MHz | |
| ATM7039c | Set-top-box | 40 nm | ARMv7-A | Cortex-A9 | 4 | 1.6 | Dual-channel (64-bit total) | PowerVR SGX544MP @ 450 MHz | |
| ATM7039s | Tablet, set-top box | 28 nm LP | ARMv7-A | Cortex-A9 | 4 | 1.6 | ? | PowerVR SGX544MP | |
| ATM7059 | Tablet, set-top box | 28 nm LP | ARMv7-A | Cortex-A9 | 4 | 1.6 | DDR3, DDR3L, LPDDR2, LPDDR3 | PowerVR SGX544MP | Q4 2014 |
| S500 | Android | 28 nm | ARMv7-A | Cortex-A9 | 4 | 1.6 | DDR3, DDR3L, LPDDR2, LPDDR3 | PowerVR SGX544MP | |
| S900 | Android | 28 nm | ARMv8-A | Cortex-A53 | 4 | 1.8 | DDR3, DDR3L, LPDDR2, LPDDR3, up to 4GB | PowerVR G6230 | |
| V500 | Virtual Reality | 28 nm | ARMv7-A | Cortex-A9 | 4 | ? | DDR3, DDR3L, LPDDR2, LPDDR3 | PowerVR SGX544MP | |
| V700 | Virtual Reality | 28 nm | ARMv8-A | Cortex-A53 | 4 | ? | DDR3, DDR3L, LPDDR2, LPDDR3 | ARM Mali-450 MP6 | |
| GT7 | GTT | 28 nm | ARMv8-A | Cortex-A53 | 4 | ? | DDR3, DDR3L, LPDDR2, LPDDR3 | ARM Mali-450 MP6 | |

=== Adoption ===
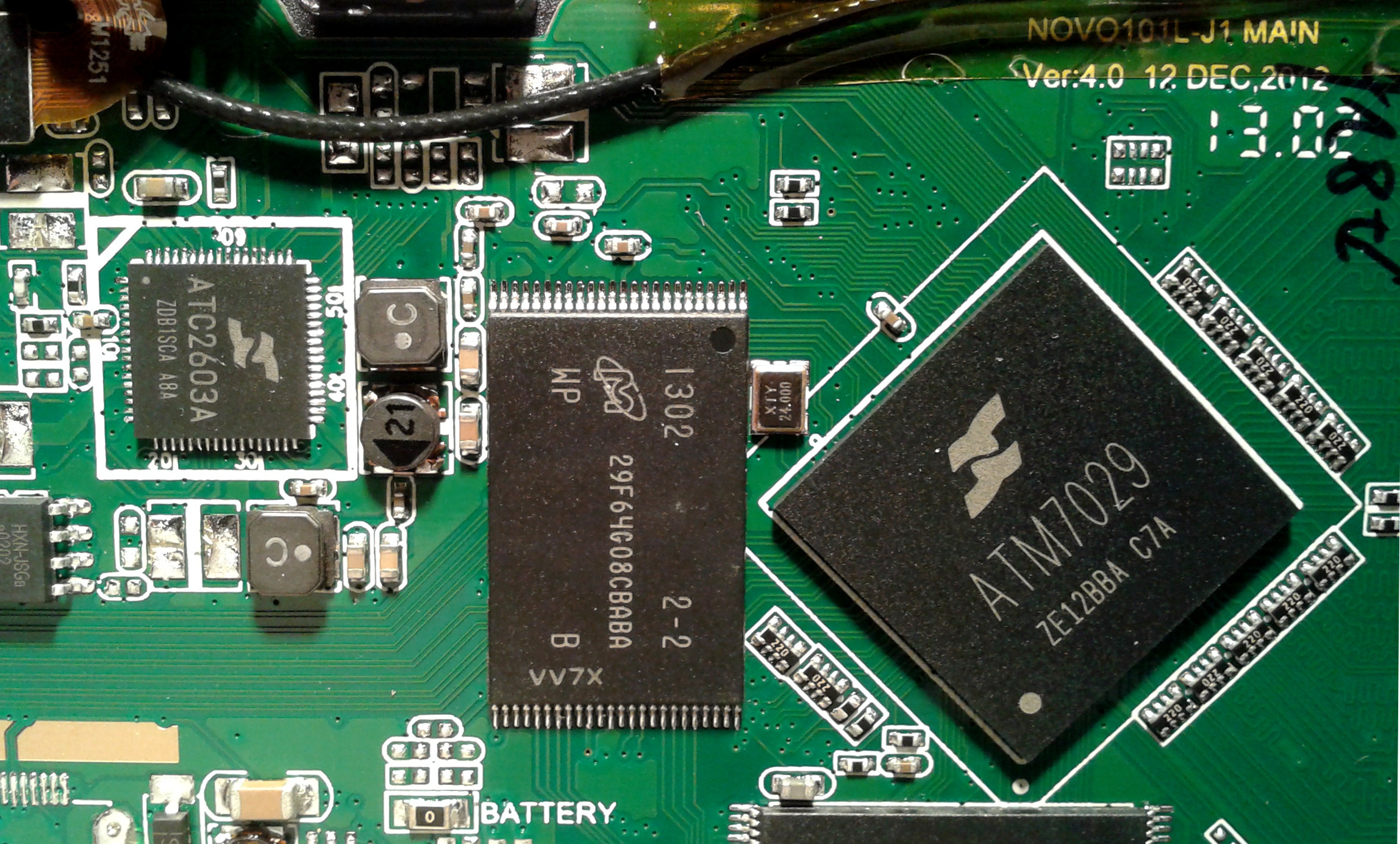
Close-up of the Ainol Hero 10 II PCB showing the Actions Semiconductor ATM7029 SoC ASIC and the ATC2603A Mixed signal ASIC.

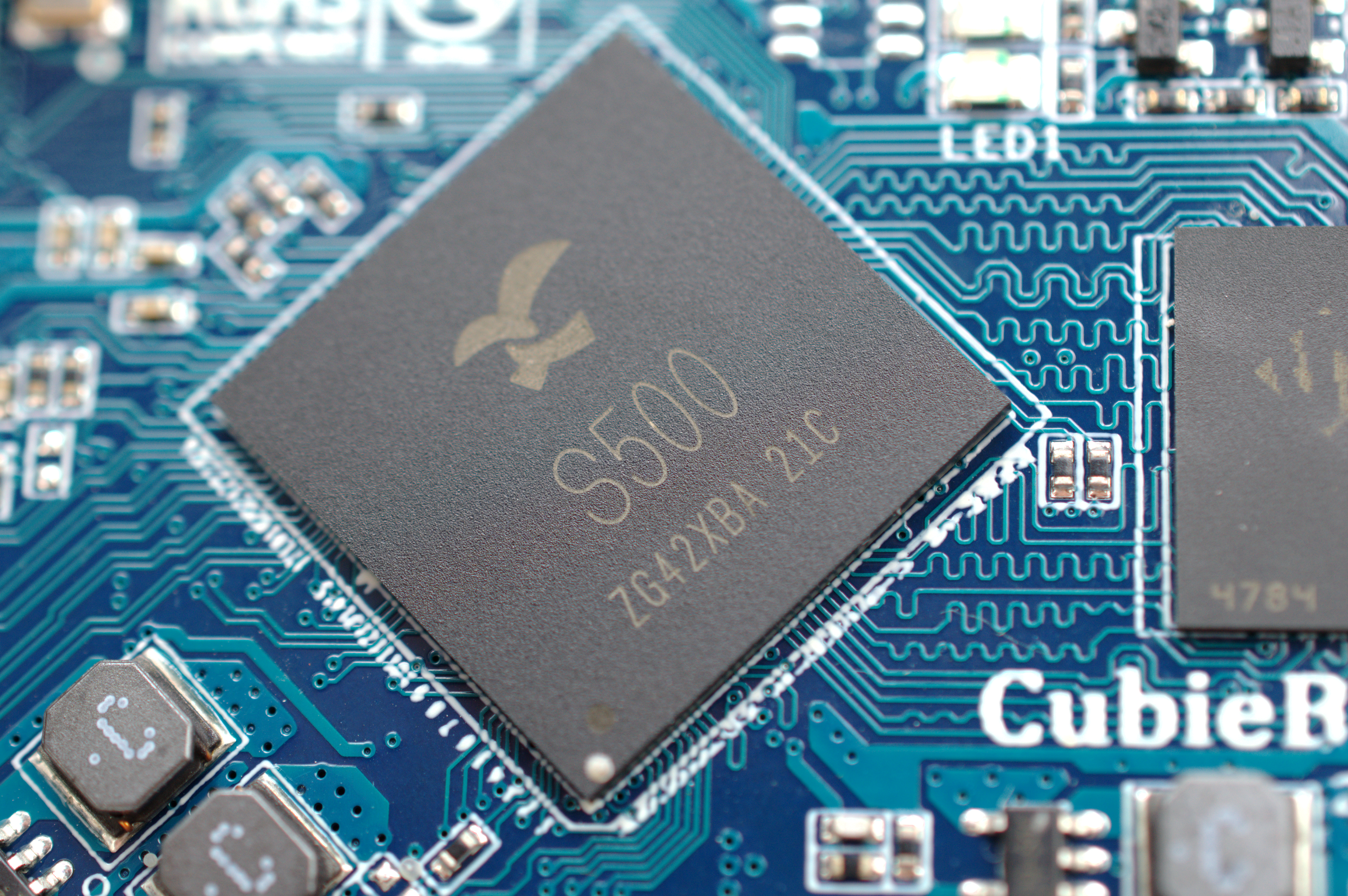
Close -up of the Cubieboard 6 PCB showing Actions Semiconductor S500 SoC

S1 MP3 players use chipsets designed by Actions.

In 2012, Actions Semiconductor produced the ATM7029 which is a quad-core ARM Cortex-A5-based SoC using Vivante Corporations GC1000 GPU. This SoC has been used in the Ainol NOVO10 Hero II tablet and other low end tablets.

For Q2 2014, Actions was reported to be fourth largest supplier of tablet processors to the Chinese market.

== Legal cases ==
At one point, Actions was sued by SigmaTel with SigmaTel prevailing. The findings were that Actions infringed upon SigmaTel by directly copying the ASICs designed by SigmaTel, once a world leader in the MP3 ASIC market. SigmaTel later was sold to Freescale Semiconductor.
