= Cubieboard =

Family of single board computer models

Cubieboard 1
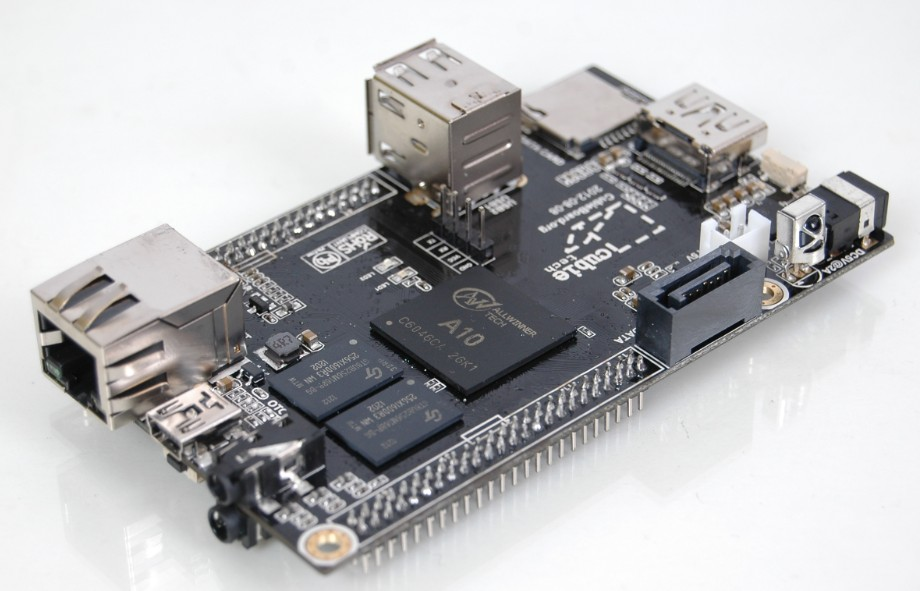
- First prototype of the Cubieboard
- Released: October 2012; 13 years ago
- Operating system: Android 4 ICS, Ubuntu 12.04 desktop, Fedora 19 ARM Remix desktop, Arch Linux ARM, FreeBSD, or OpenBSD.
- CPU: Cortex-A8 @ 1 GHz CPU,
- Memory: 512 MiB (beta) or 1 GiB (final) DDR3
- Storage: 4 GB NAND flash built-in, 1x microSD slot,
- Graphics: Mali-400 MP

Cubieboard 4
- Released: 10 March 2015; 11 years ago
- CPU: 4x Cortex-A15 and 4x Cortex-A7 implementing ARM big.LITTLE
- Memory: Built-in, 2 GiB.
- Storage: 8 GiB, internal.
- Graphics: PowerVR G6230 (Rogue)

Cubieboard is/WAS a single-board computer, made in Zhuhai, Guangdong, China. The first short run of prototype boards were sold internationally in September 2012, and the production version started to be sold in October 2012. Several other versions from Cubieboard2 to 6 were produced between 2012 and 2017. The website for sales and support appears to have been unmodified with no response to essential software links being down since 2017.

It can run Android 4 ICS, Ubuntu 12.04 desktop, Fedora 19 ARM Remix desktop, Armbian, Arch Linux ARM, a Debian-based Cubian distribution, FreeBSD, or OpenBSD.

It uses the AllWinner A10 SoC, popular on cheap tablets, phones and media PCs. This SoC is used by developers of the lima driver, an open-source driver for the ARM Mali GPU. At the 2013 FOSDEM demo it ran ioquake 3 at 47 fps in 1024×600.

The Cubieboard team managed to run an Apache Hadoop computer cluster using the Lubuntu Linux distribution.

== Technical specifications ==
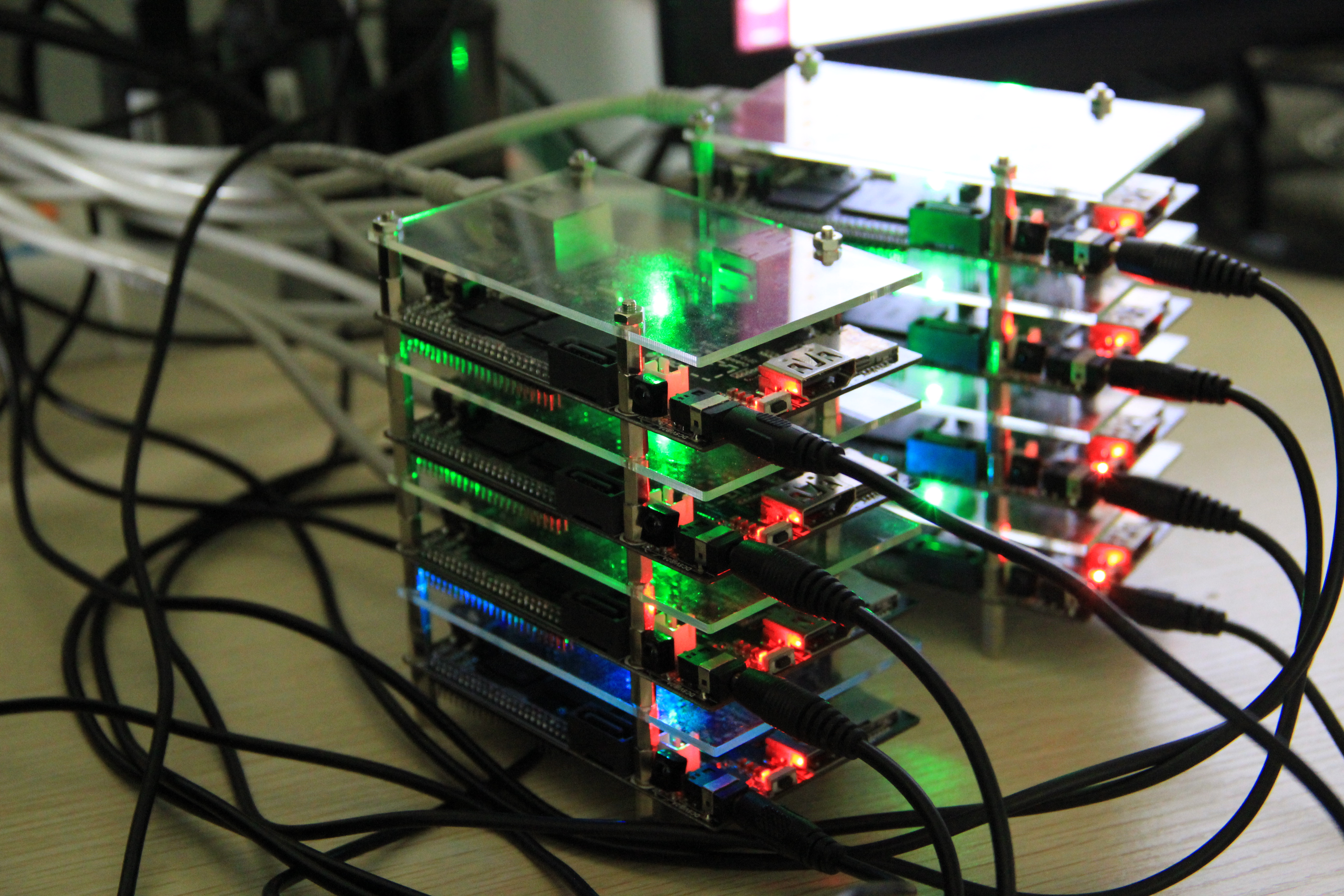
A Cubieboard cluster running Apache Hadoop

=== Cubieboard1 ===
The little motherboard utilizes the AllWinner A10 capabilities

- SoC: AllWinner A10
  - CPU: Cortex-A8 @ 1 GHz CPU,
  - GPU Mali-400 MP
  - video acceleration: CedarX able to decode 2160p video
  - display controller: unknown, supports HDMI 1080p
- 512 MiB (beta) or 1 GiB (final) DDR3
- 4 GB NAND flash built-in, 1x microSD slot, 1x SATA port.
- 10/100 Ethernet connector
- 2x USB Host, 1x USB OTG, 1x CIR.
- 96 extend pin including I²C, SPI, LVDS
- Dimensions: 10 cm × 6 cm

=== Cubieboard2 ===
The second version, sold since June 2013, enhances the board mainly by replacing the Allwinner A10 SoC with an Allwinner A20 which contains 2 ARM Cortex-A7 MPCore CPUs and a dual fragment shader Mali-400 GPU (Mali-400MP2).

This board is used by Fedora to test and develop the Allwinner SoC port of the distribution.

There is also a version available with two microSD card slots.

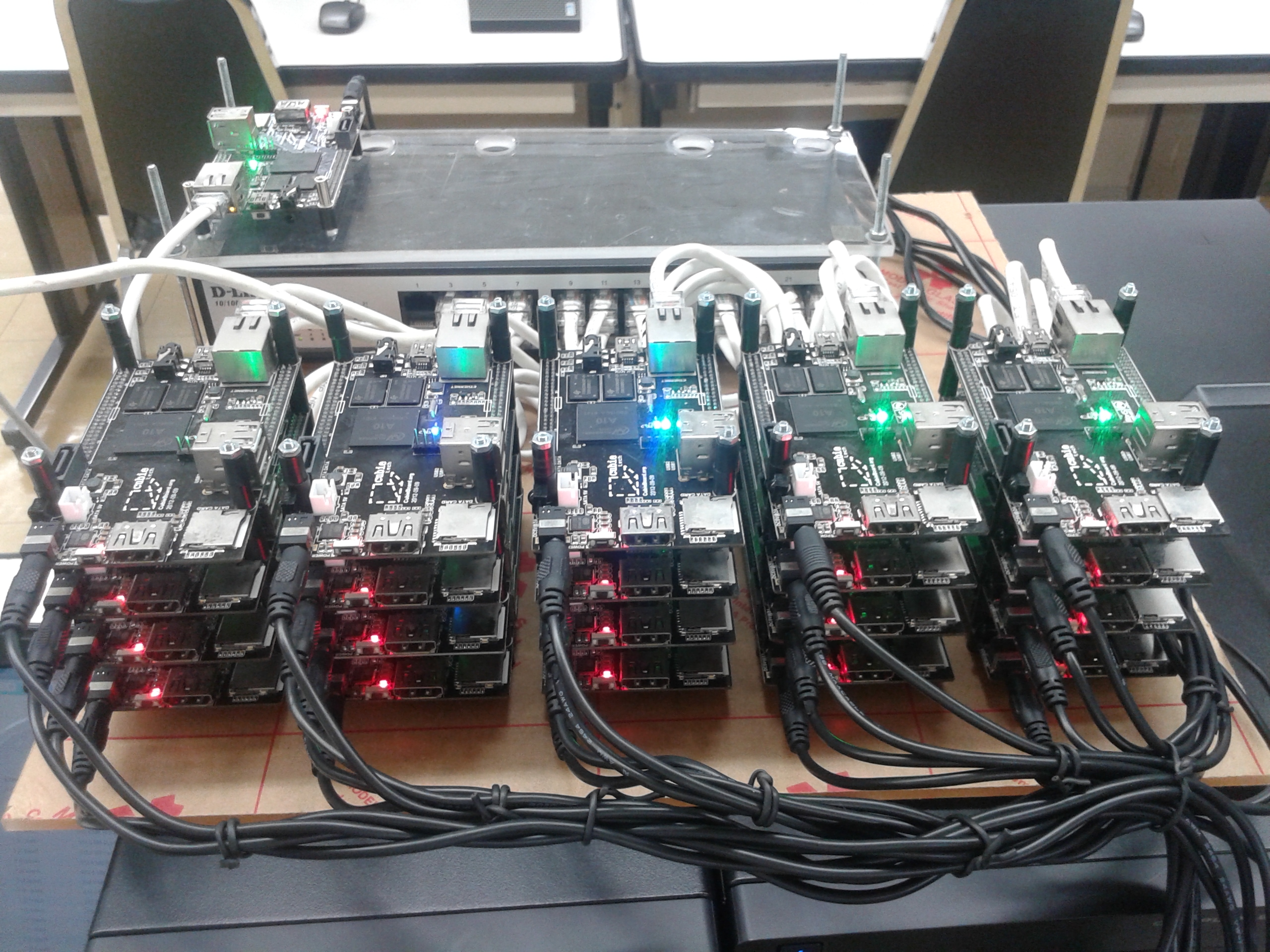
Cubieboard cluster using Aiyara cluster

=== Cubietruck (Cubieboard3) ===
The third version has a new and larger PCB layout and features the following hardware:

- SoC: Allwinner A20
  - CPU: ARM Cortex-A7 @ 1 GHz dual-core
  - GPU: Mali-400 MP2
  - display controller: Mali-400 GPU, supports HDMI 1080p, no LVDS support
- 2 GiB DDR3 @ 480 MHz
- 8 GB NAND flash built-in, 1x microSD slot, 1x SATA 2.0 port (Hard Disk of 2,5").
- 10/100/1000 RTL8211E Gigabit Ethernet
- 2x USB Host, 1x USB OTG, 1x CIR.
- S/PDIF, headphone, VGA and HDMI audio out, mic and line-in via extended pins
- Wi-Fi and Bluetooth on board with PCB antenna (Broadcom BCM4329/BCM40181)
- 54 extended pins including I²C, SPI
- Dimensions: 11 cm × 8 cm

There is no LVDS support any longer. The RTL8211E NIC allows transfer rates up to 630–638 Mbit/s (sending while 5–10% idle) and 850–860 Mbit/s (receiving while 0–2% idle) when simultaneous TCP connections are established (testing was done utilising iperf with three clients against Cubietruck running Lubuntu)

To connect a 3.5" HDD the necessary 12 V power can be delivered by a 3.5 inch HDD addon package which can be used to power the Cubietruck itself as well. Also new is the option to power the Cubietruck from LiPo batteries.

=== Cubieboard 4 ===
On May 4, 2014 CubieTech announced the Cubieboard 4, the board is also known as CC-A80. It is based on an Allwinner A80 SoC (quad Cortex-A15, quad Cortex-A7 big.LITTLE), thereby replacing the Mali GPU with a PowerVR GPU. The board was officially released on 10 March 2015.

- SoC: Allwinner A80
  - CPU: 4x Cortex-A15 and 4x Cortex-A7 implementing ARM big.LITTLE
  - GPU: PowerVR G6230 (Rogue)
  - video acceleration: A new generation of display engine that supports H.265, 4K resolution codec and 3-screen simultaneous output
  - display controller: unknown, supports:
- microUSB 3.0 OTG

=== Cubietruck Plus (Cubieboard 5) ===
The fifth version has the same PCB layout and almost the same features as the CubieTruck.

- SoC: Allwinner H8
  - CPU: ARM Cortex-A7 @ 2 GHz octa-core
  - GPU: PowerVR SGX544 @ 700 MHz
  - display controller: Toshiba TC358777XBG, supports HDMI 1.4 1080p and DisplayPort, no LVDS support
- 2 GiB DDR3
- 8 GB EMMC flash built-in, 1x microSD slot, 1x SATA 2.0 port (Hard Disk of 2,5") via USB bridge.
- 10/100/1000M RJ45 Gigabit Ethernet
- 2x USB Host, 1x USB OTG, 1x CIR.
- S/PDIF, headphone, and HDMI audio out, mic and line-in via 3.5mm jack, and onboard mic.
- Wi-Fi (dual-radio 2.4 and 5 GHz) and Bluetooth on board with PCB antenna
- 70 extended pins including I²C, SPI
- Dimensions: 11 cm × 8 cm

== See also ==
- List of open-source hardware projects
