= Nufront =

Chinese semiconductor company

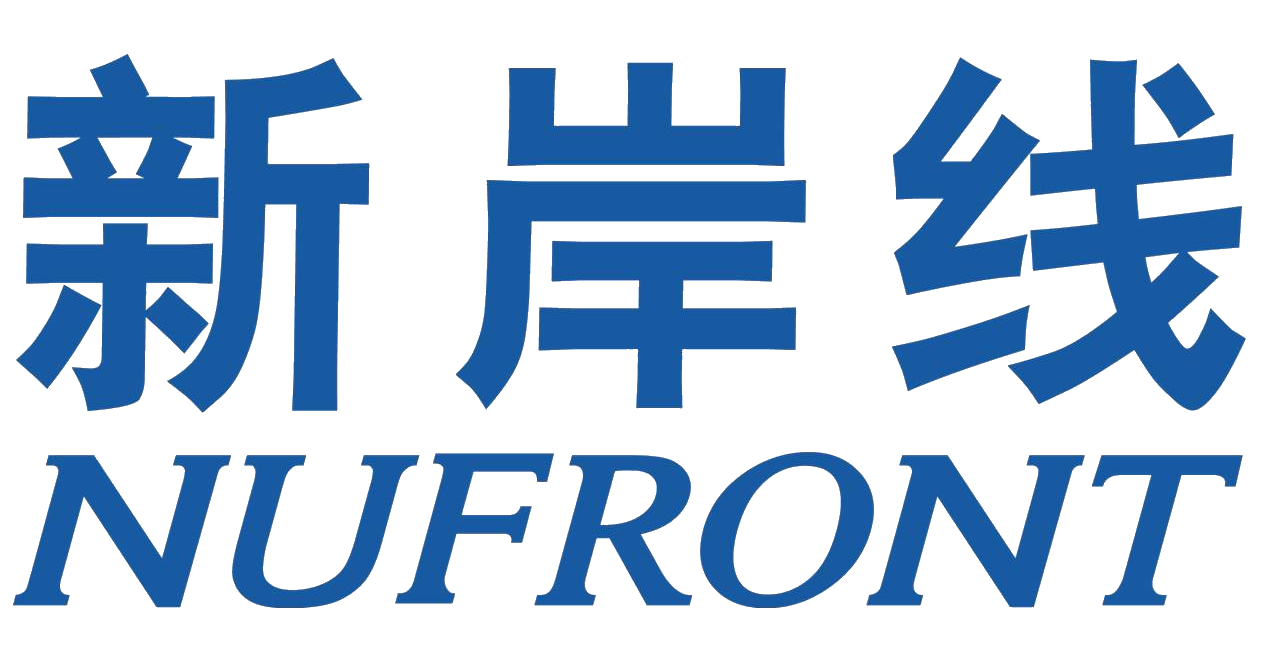
- Native name: 新岸线
- Industry: Semiconductor
- Founded: 2004
- Headquarters: Beijing, China
- Products: SoCs
- Number of employees: 1000+ (2015)
- Website: nufrontsoft.com

Nufront Co., Ltd. is a Chinese fabless semiconductor company founded in 2004 that provides system-on-chip integrated circuits for tablets and smartphones.

== Products ==
=== Processors ===
Model	CPU instruction set	Process	CPU	GPU	Baseband	Released
NS2816	ARMv7-A	?	Up to 2.0 GHz dual-core Cortex-A9	Mali-400	N/A	2010
NS115	ARMv7-A	40 nm	Up to 1.5 GHz dual-core Cortex-A9	Mali-400 MP2	N/A	2012
TL7688	ARMv7-A	40 nm	Up to 1.5 GHz quad-core Cortex-A9 big.LITTLE	Mali-400 MP2	2G/WCDMA/HSPA+	2013?
TL7689	ARMv7-A	40 nm	Up to 1.5 GHz quad-core Cortex-A9 big.LITTLE	Mali-400 MP2	2G/WCDMA/HSPA+	2013?
TL7788	ARMv7-A	28 nm HKMG	Up to 1.8 GHz quad-core Cortex-A7	?	2G/WCDMA/HSPA+, DualSIM	2013?
TL7789	ARMv7-A	28 nm HKMG	Up to 1.8 GHz quad-core Cortex-A7	?	2G/WCDMA/HSPA+, DualSIM	2013?
TL7790	ARMv7-A		Up to 1.5 GHz quad-core Cortex-A7	?	2G/WCDMA/FDD/TDD-LTE	
TL7791	ARMv7-A		Up to 1.5 GHz quad-core Cortex-A7	?	2G/WCDMA/FDD/TDD-LTE	

=== Other Chipsets ===
Model	Process	Function	Released
NR6651	?	RF SoC	?
NP688	?	PMU + Audio Codecs	?
NCP6541	?	Wi-Fi/BT/FM/GPS	?
TL7619	65 nm	Baseband Processor	?
TL7619C	?	Baseband Processor	?
NL6621	?	WiFi	?
NF210A	?	WiFi Module	?
NF210D	?	WiFi Module	?
NF210S	?	WiFi Module	?

== See also ==
- Allwinner Technology
- HiSilicon
- InfoTM
- Leadcore Technology
- MediaTek
- Rockchip
- Spreadtrum
