= Arch Linux ARM =

Arch Linux distribution fork dedicated to ARM architectures

- Developer: Kevin Mihelich and team
- OS family: Linux (Unix-like)
- Latest release: Rolling release
- Update method: Pacman
- Package manager: Pacman
- Supported platforms: ARM
- License: Free software (GPLv2)
- Official website: archlinuxarm.org

Arch Linux ARM is a port of Arch Linux for ARM processors. Its design philosophy is "simplicity and full control to the end user," and like its parent operating system Arch Linux, aims to be very Unix-like.

== History and development ==
Arch Linux ARM is based on Arch Linux, which is a minimalist Linux distribution first released on March 11, 2002. The idea of making a single, official port of Arch Linux for devices with ARM processors was born from members of the Arch Linux PlugApps and ArchMobile development teams, notably Mike Staszel, who went on to found the Arch Linux ARM project.

Kevin Mihelich is currently Arch Linux ARM's primary developer. Arch Linux ARM is community-developed, with software development and user support provided fully by volunteer effort and donations. Also, unlike other community-supported operating systems such as Ubuntu, Arch Linux ARM has a relatively small user base, making user participation in development especially important.

Arch Linux ARM follows a rolling release cycle, i.e. new software is packaged as it is released. This "bleeding edge" release cycle of small, frequent package updates differs from release cycles of Linux distributions such as Debian, which focus on large, scheduled releases of packages proven to be stable.

== Supported processors ==
Unlike Arch Linux, which is aimed at x86-64 CPUs, Arch Linux ARM targets ARM CPUs and, as a result, it supports many single-board computers such as the Raspberry Pi.

There is support for:

- ARMv7 1st generation Cortex-A8 platforms, such as the BeagleBoard or Cubieboard
- ARMv7 2nd generation Cortex-A9 and Tegra platforms, such as the PandaBoard or TrimSlice
- ARMv7 3rd generation Cortex-A7 and Cortex-A15 platforms, such as the Cubieboard2, Odroid XU, Samsung Chromebook (series 3), Samsung Chromebook 2 or Raspberry Pi 2
- ARMv8 64-bit capable Cortex-A53 and Cortex-A72 platforms, such as the Odroid C2 and N2, Acer Chromebook R13, Raspberry Pi 3 or Raspberry Pi 4/Pi 400.

Arch Linux ARM can run on any device that supports ARMv7 or ARMv8 instruction sets, including the 64-bit ARMv8 instruction set of the Raspberry Pi 3 and Raspberry Pi 4/Pi 400.

There are officially supported platforms and community-supported ones as well.

== Reception ==
Arch Linux ARM has gained popularity as a lightweight Linux distribution, and in 2014 was growing in popularity among single-board computer hobbyists. Arch Linux ARM is also known for having good community support.

== See also ==
- List of Linux distributions
- Comparison of Linux distributions
