= Leadcore Technology =

Chinese fabless semiconductor company

Leadcore Technology Co., Ltd.
- Native name: 联芯科技有限公司
- Industry: Fabless semiconductors
- Headquarters: Shanghai, China
- Number of employees: 1,000+
- Parent: Datang Telecom Technology
- Website: www.leadcoretech.com

Leadcore Technology is a Chinese fabless semiconductor company that provides system-on-chip solutions for smartphones and tablets, specializing in the TD-SCDMA and TD-LTE network standards used in China and in other countries.

According to the Market Intelligence & Consulting Institute, Leadcore was the fourth largest integrated circuit design company in China by revenue in 2008. DigiTimes said that in Q2 2014 Leadcore was the sixth-largest supplier of smartphone application processors in China with a market share of 3% of all units, which represents unit shipments of about 3 million.

On May 26, 2017, Qualcomm (China) Holdings Co., Ltd., Beijing Jianguang Asset Management Co., Ltd., Leadcore Technology Co., Ltd. and Beijing Zhilu Asset Management Co., Ltd. jointly signed an agreement to establish a joint venture company - Lingsheng Technology (Guizhou) Ltd. (JLQ Technology). The joint venture will focus on the smartphone chipset business in China.

== Product list ==
=== Smartphone/tablet processors ===
Model Number	Appli-cation	Fab	CPU					GPU		Display resolution	Memory interface	Modem	Released
Model Number	Appli-cation	Fab	ISA	μarch	Cores	Freq. (GHz)	L2 cache	μarch	Freq. (MHz)	Display resolution	Memory interface	Modem	Released
LC1810	Smart phone	40 nm	ARMv7-A	Cortex-A9	2	1.2	512 KB	Mali-400 MP2	300	Up to 1920x1080	400 MHz LPDDR2	2G/3G (GSM, GSM-DSDA, TD-HSPA+)	
LC1811	Smart phone	40 nm	ARMv7-A	Cortex-A9	2	1.2	512 KB	Mali-400 MP2	300	Up to 1280x800	400 MHz LPDDR2	2G/3G (GSM, GSM-DSDA, TD-HSPA+)	
LC1813	Smart phone	40 nm	ARMv7-A	Cortex-A7	4	1.2	?	Mali-400 MP2	400	Up to 1280x800	LPDDR, LPDDR2, DDR3	2G/3G (GSM, GSM-DSDS, TD-HSPA)	2013
LC1913	Tablet	40 nm	ARMv7-A	Cortex-A7	4	1.4	?	Mali-400 MP2	400	Up to 1280x800	LPDDR, LPDDR2, DDR3	2G/3G (GSM, GSM-DSDS, TD-HSPA)	2013
LC1860	Smart phone	28 nm	ARMv7-A	Cortex-A7	6	2.0	?	Mali-T628 MP2	600	Up to 2K	Dual-channel LPDDR3	4G (TD-LTE, LTE FDD Cat 4)	2014
LC1860C	Smart phone	28 nm	ARMv7-A	Cortex-A7	4	1.5	?	Mali-T628 MP2	600	Up to 720p	Single-channel 32-bit LPDDR2, LPDDR3	4G (TD-LTE, LTE FDD Cat 4)	2014
LC1960	Tablet	28 nm	ARMv7-A	Cortex-A7	6	2.0	?	Mali-T628 MP2	600	?	?	4G (TD-LTE, LTE FDD Cat 4)	2014

The LC1810/1811 are an older generation platform supporting the Android 4.0 platform. For the camera interface, LC1810 has a 20M pixels ISP, the LC1811 an 8M pixels ISP.

The LC1813/1913 were released in 2013 and support Android 4.3. Both chips have a 13M pixels ISP. The LC1913 tablet processor has USB-OTG support as an extra feature.

The LC1860 and LC1960 with hexa-core CPU and LTE support were announced in 2014 and support Android 4.4. The LC1860 has a 20M pixels ISP. The LC1860C is a lower-end version of the LC1860 with quad-core CPU, lower GPU speed, single-channel memory interface and a 13M pixels ISP.

The company also offers feature phone processors, including the LC1712, manufactured at 55 nm, and the 65 nm L1808B.

== See also ==
- Allwinner Technology
- HiSilicon
- InfoTM
- MediaTek
- Nufront
- Qualcomm
- Rockchip
- Spreadtrum
