= JLQ =

JLQ can refer to:

- Justice League Queer, a fictional team of LGBTQIA+ superheroes in the DC Comics universe
- Justice League Quarterly, an American comic book series about the DC Comics universe running from 1990 to 1994
- JLQ Technology, a joint venture company formed by Chinese semiconductor company Leadcore Technology and three other companies
