= Lenovo A680 =

2014 smartphone model

- Brand: Lenovo
- Manufacturer: Lenovo
- Type: Smartphone
- First released: May 2014
- Discontinued: Yes
- Compatible networks: 2G GSM, 3G WCDMA / HSPA+
- Form factor: Slate
- Color: Black
- Dimensions: 145×73.5×10.8 mm (5.71×2.89×0.43 in)
- Weight: 165 g (5.8 oz)
- Operating system: Android 4.2 Jelly Bean
- System-on-chip: MediaTek MT6582M
- CPU: Quad-core 1.3 GHz Cortex-A7
- GPU: Mali-400MP2
- Memory: 1 GB RAM
- Storage: 4 GB ROM
- Removable storage: microSDHC (expandable up to 32 GB)
- SIM: Single SIM or Dual SIM
- Battery: Replaceable 2000 mAh Li-polymer
- Rear camera: 5 MP Fixed Focus
- Front camera: 0.3 MP (VGA) Fixed Focus
- Display: 5.0 in (127 mm); FWVGA (854 x 480) TN; Capacitive Touchscreen

The Lenovo A680 is an Android smartphone developed and manufactured by Lenovo. The device was announced and subsequently released in May 2014 as an entry-level smartphone.

== Specifications ==
=== Design ===
The Lenovo A680 features a standard slate form factor with dimensions of 145 mm (5.71 in) in height, 73.5 mm (2.89 in) in width, and 10.8 mm (0.43 in) in thickness. The smartphone weighs approximately 165 g (5.82 oz). The exterior design includes dual SIM card functionality and was made available to consumers in either a black or white color finish.

=== Hardware ===
The device is powered by a MediaTek MT6582 system-on-chip, built on a 28 nm process node. The CPU consists of a quad-core 1.3 GHz Cortex-A7 central processing unit (CPU) alongside a Mali-400MP2 graphics processing unit (GPU). The phone is equipped with 1 GB of RAM. The internal storage capacity is limited to 4 GB, though it can be expanded via a dedicated microSDHC card slot. The device is powered by a removable 2000 mAh Lithium polymer (Li-Po) battery.

=== Display ===
The handset features a 5.0-inch TFT LCD capacitive touchscreen display panel with a resolution of 480 × 854 pixels and an approximate pixel density of 196 pixels per inch (ppi). This screen occupies approximately 64.6% of the device's front surface area, yielding a 16:9 aspect ratio.

=== Cameras ===
The primary rear-facing setup features a single 5 megapixel camera capable of recording video. On the front side of the device, a single VGA camera is present to support video calls and basic photography.

=== Software ===
The Lenovo A680 ships with the Android 4.2.2 Jelly Bean operating system out of the box.
