= Allwinner Technology =

Chinese semiconductor design and shipping company

Allwinner Technology Co., Ltd
- Native name: 全志
- Type: Public
- Traded as: SHE:300458
- Industry: Fabless semiconductors
- Founded: 2007; 19 years ago
- Headquarters: Zhuhai, Guangdong, China
- Products: Integrated circuits
- Number of employees: 800 (2025)
- Website: www.allwinnertech.com

Allwinner Technology Co., Ltd is a Chinese fabless semiconductor company specialized in mixed-signal systems on a chips (SoC). The company is headquartered in Zhuhai, Guangdong, China.

Since founded in 2007, Allwinner has released over fifteen SoC processors for use in Android-based tablets, as well as smartphones, over-the-air OTT boxes, video camera systems, car DVRs, and car media players.

In 2012 and 2013, Allwinner was the number one supplier in terms of unit shipments of application processors for Android tablets worldwide. For Q2 2014, Allwinner was reported by DigiTimes to be the third largest supplier to the Chinese market after Rockchip and MediaTek.

Allwinner was founded by senior engineers who left Zhuhai-based Actions Semiconductor after a dispute over their share of the earnings from Actions' 2005 initial public offering. Its early strategy focused on whitebox vendors and ODMs and OEMs.

== Product lines ==
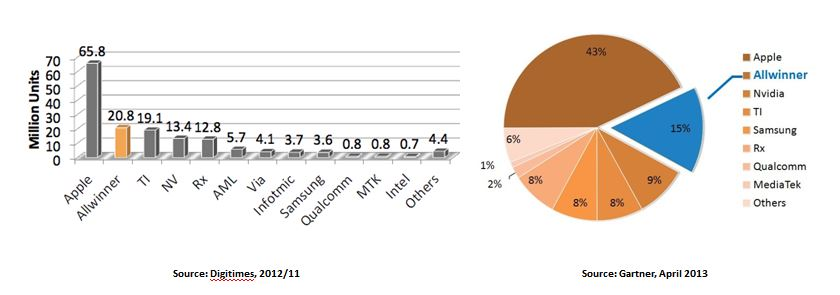
Allwinner was the No. 1 supplier of application processors for Android tablets in 2012

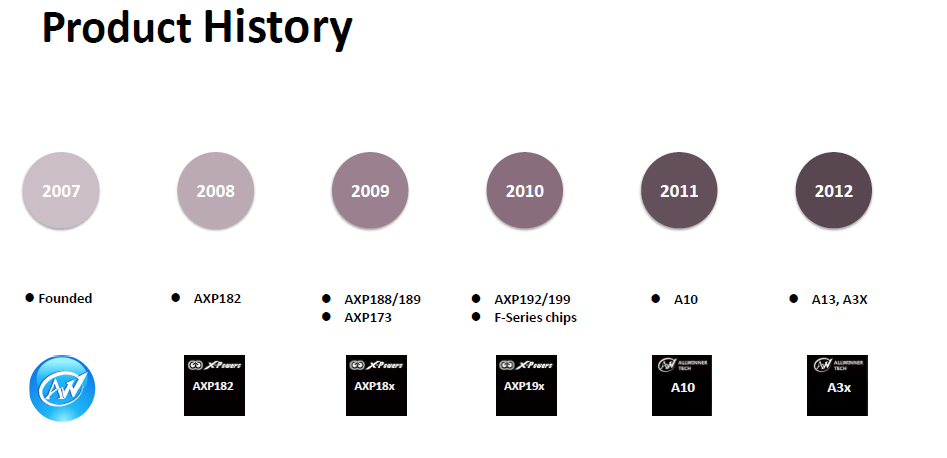
Allwinner Product History

=== A-Series ===
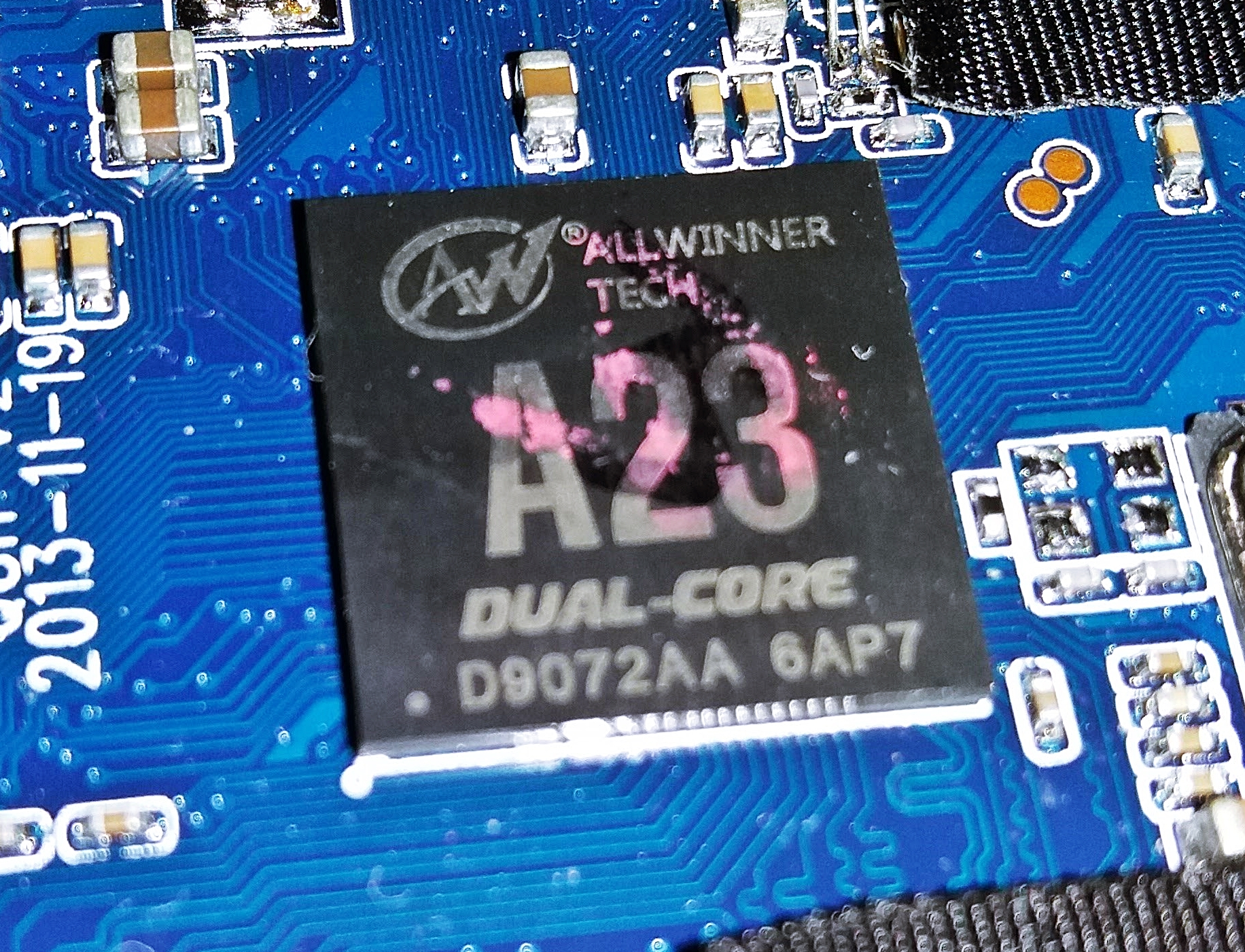
Allwinner A23 Dual-Core in a Chinese Tablet

A series processors are used for mobile applications, mainly referring to tablet application.

==== A1x family ====
In 2011, the company became an ARM processor licensee, and subsequently announced a series of ARM Cortex-A8 powered mobile application processors, including A10, A13 and A10s, which were used in numerous tablets, and also in PC-on-a-stick and media center devices. They have also been adopted in free hardware projects like the Cubieboard development board.

==== A2x and A3x family ====
In December 2012, Allwinner announced the availability of two ARM Cortex-A7 MPCore powered products, the dual-core Allwinner A20 and quad-core Allwinner A31. Production of the A31 started in September 2012 and end products, mostly high-end tablets from Chinese manufacturers, appeared on the market in early 2013, including the Onda V972.

In March 2013, Allwinner launched its quad-core Phablet processor A31s. Based on quad-core cortex-A7 CPU architecture, this processor allows 3G, 2G, LTE, WIFI, BT, FM, GPS, AGPS and NFC using a minimum of external components.

In October 2013, Allwinner released its second dual-core A23, touted to be "The most efficient dual core processor" for tablets. The A23's CPU frequency was intended to run up to 1.5 GHz.

In June 2014, Allwinner announced the A33 quad-core SoC that is pin compatible with Allwinner's A23. The new SoC features four Cortex-A7 cores with 256 KB L1 cache, 512 KB L2 cache and a Mali-400 MP2 GPU. A new feature is the support of the OpenMAX API. Allwinner has positioned the A33 for entry-level tablets, targeting quad-core tablets priced from $30 to $60, and in July 2014 announced that it had started mass production of the chip, which would supposedly sell for as low as $4 per unit.

==== A5x family ====
In April 2019, Allwinner announced the A50 28 nm quad-core SoC. The A50 features four Cortex-A7 cores running up to 1.8 GHz with 512 KB L2 cache and a Mali-400 MP2 GPU.

==== A6x family ====
In June 2017, Allwinner announced the A63 28 nm quad-core SoC at APC 2017 Conference. The A63 features four Cortex-A53 cores running up to 1.8 GHz with 512 KB L2 cache and a Mali-T760 MP2 GPU with OpenGL ES 3.2 support. VPU with 4K/6K VP9, H.265, and H.264 4K @ 30 fps video decoder and H.264 HP encoder 1080P@30 fps

==== A8x family ====
In October 2013, Allwinner disclosed its upcoming octa-core A80 SoC, featuring four high-performance ARM Cortex-A15 and four efficient ARM Cortex-A7 CPU cores in a big.LITTLE configuration.

On June 30, 2014, Chinese brand Onda officially released its octa-core Onda V989 tablet, which is based on Allwinner A80. This is the first Allwinner A80-based tablet that is available to consumers, priced at CNY 1099 (~US$177).

In September 2014, Allwinner announced the Allwinner A83T, an octa-core tablet processor that packs eight highly energy-efficient Cortex-A7 cores that can run simultaneously at up to around 2.0 GHz. It also includes a PowerVR GPU. The first tablet with the chip was expected to hit the market in Q4 2014.

==== A10x/20x/30x family ====
In April 2019, Allwinner announced their roadmap for 2019 to 2020 feature the A100, A200, A300 and A301 SoC. The Allwinner A200 was described as "AI blessing, computational power".

=== F-Series ===
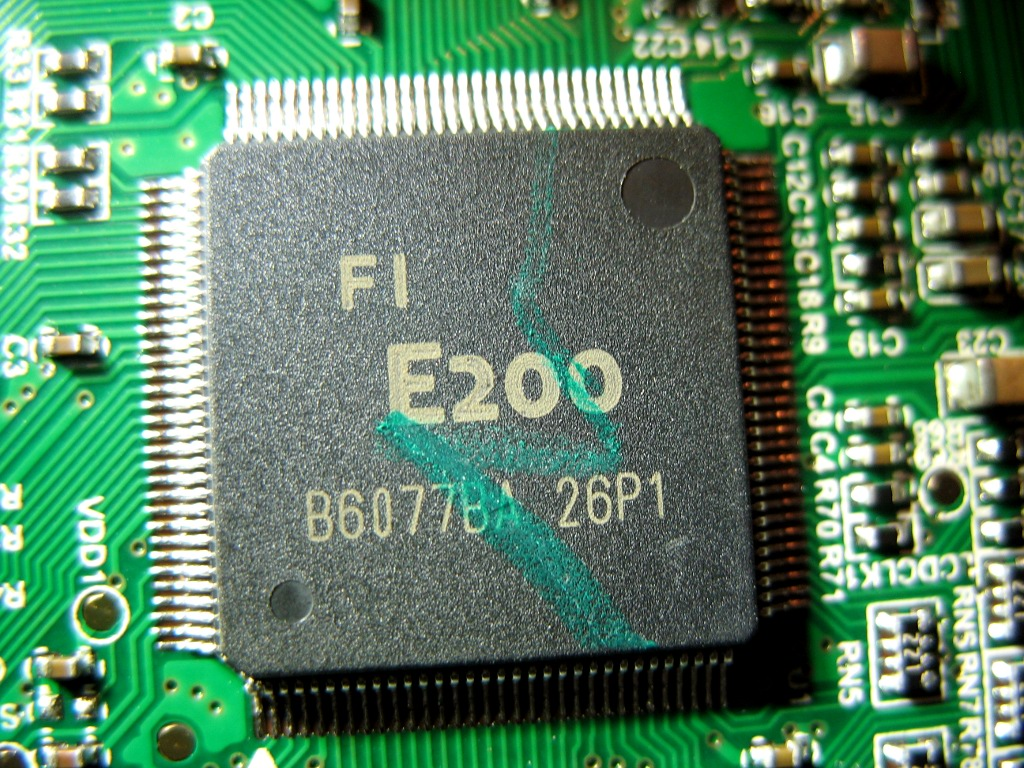
Allwinner F1E200

F series are processors based on Allwinner's melis OS, mainly used in smart video radios, video MP5, etc.

From 2007 to 2011, Allwinner introduced its F-series processors, including the F10, F13, F18, F20, F1E200, F1C100, and F20. This series runs Allwinner's in-house operating system Melis2.0, which is now mainly used in vehicle multimedia systems, E-ink readers, video intercom systems, and so on.

Sega's Game Gear Micro uses the F1C200S as main CPU.

=== H-Series ===
The H-series, introduced in 2014, are integrated application processors primarily targeted at OTT set-top box applications e.g. HDMI mini PCs, gaming boxes, etc.;

Allwinner has launched the A80 octa-core OTT box solution, targeting at high-end OTT box market, and launched the Allwinner H8 octa-core processor for mid-range OTT boxes, and most recently launched the quad-core Allwinner H3 targeting the US$35 - $50 OTT box market.

=== R-Series ===
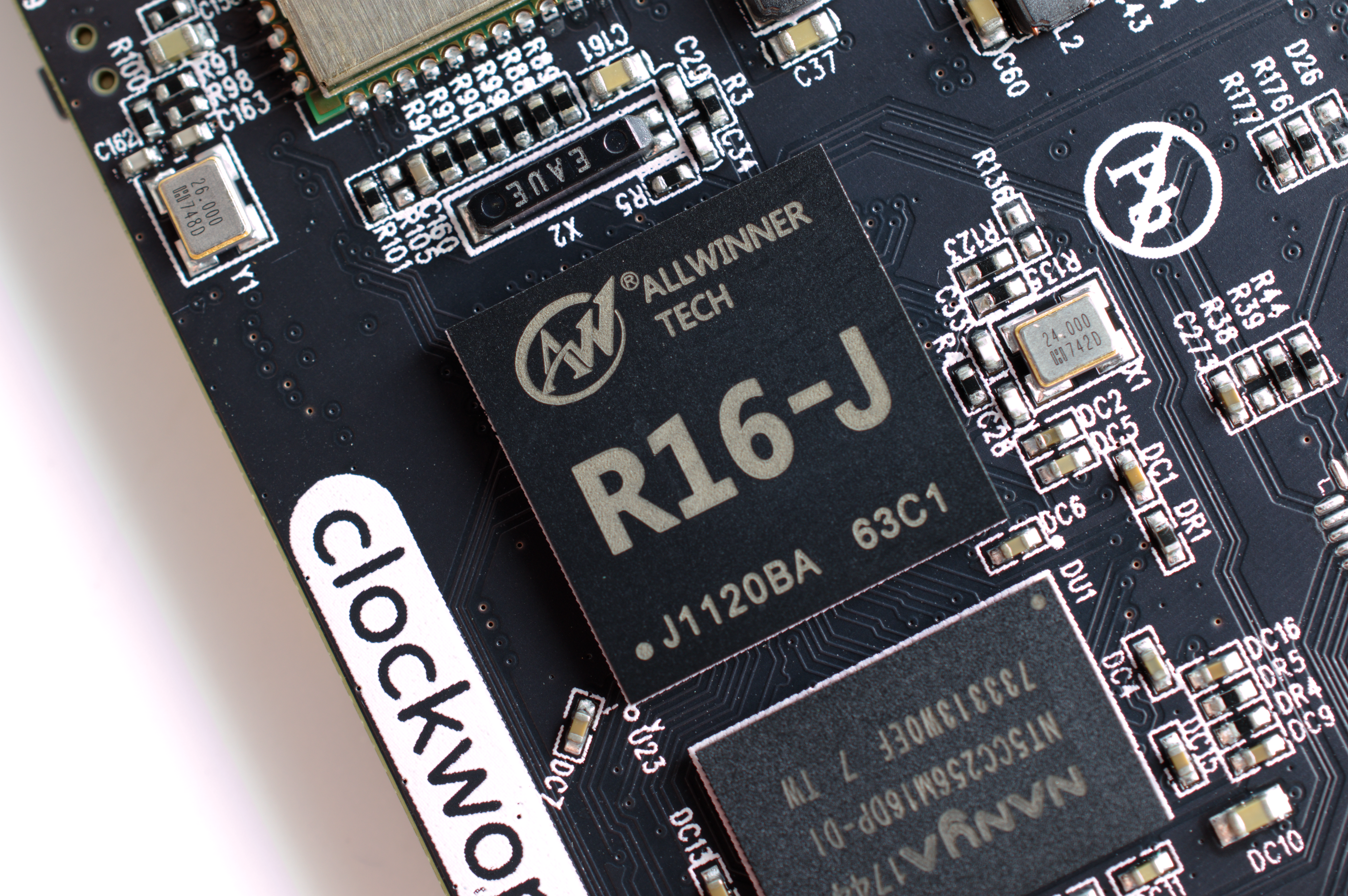
An Allwinner R16-J

The R ("Real-Time") Series Chip is designed for low power applications where timing is critical and must be done at the edge rather than in the fog or cloud. The chip also has built in redundancies to meet industrial and automotive standards for processing.

The R Series Chip has been applicable to a number of different industries including Industrial Automation, Safe PLCs, Power Generation and Distribution, Healthcare and Automotive Technology. The technology, specifically the R16 Chip, has also been utilised for robotic vacuums, Nintendo Classic Mini systems and smart speakers resulting from a longterm partnership with the Cogobuy Group's subsidiary IngDan (硬蛋).

The R40 and R16 technology has been implemented on a number of Banana Pi models. The R8 Chip was also used for "The World's First Nine Dollar Computer" Kickstarter project in 2015.

=== V-Series ===
The V-Series are video encoding processor targeting applications such as smart DVR, IP camera and smart home applications. It is similar to the A series SoC, but adds support for functions such as digital watermarking, motion detection and video scaling, as well as a CBR/VBR bit rate control mode.

== Chipset specifications ==
The Allwinner SoC family includes A-series, which is intended for Android OS, and F-series, which is intended for the company's self-developed Melis operating system.

The A-Series, including the A10, A20 and A31 SoCs, have a proprietary in-house designed multimedia co-processing DSP (Digital Signal Processing) processor technology for hardware accelerated video, image, and audio decoding, called CedarX (with subprocessing called "CedarV" for video decoding and "CedarA" for audio decoding), able to decode 2160p 2D and 1080p 3D video. The main disadvantages with CedarX technology and associated libraries is that Allwinner's own CedarX proprietary libraries have no clear usage license, so even if the source code for some versions is available the terms-of-use is unknown in open source software, and there is no glue code for any other multimedia frameworks on Linux systems that could be used as a middle-ware, like for example OpenMAX or VAAPI.

=== A-Series ===
The A-series are integrated application processors primarily targeting tablets as well as targeting mini PCs, development boards and TV boxes.

SoC	Fab	CPU				GPU (Clock)	Video Decoder	Video Encoder	Package, Size (mm), Pitch (mm)	Application	Examples
SoC	Fab	ISA4K	μarch	Cores	L2 cache	GPU (Clock)	Video Decoder	Video Encoder	Package, Size (mm), Pitch (mm)	Application	Examples
A10	55 nm	ARMv7-A	Cortex-A8	1	256 KB	Mali-400 (300 MHz)	2160p	H.264 1080p @ 30 fps	BGA441, 19×19, 0.80	Tablet, smart TV	List: Gooseberry, Cubieboard, MarsBoard, Fusion5, OLinuXino-A10
A10s	55 nm	ARMv7-A	Cortex-A8	1	256 KB	Mali-400 (300 MHz)	2160p	H.264 1080p @ 30 fps	BGA336, 14×14, 0.65	HDMI Dongle	OLinuXino A10S
A13	55 nm	ARMv7-A	Cortex-A8	1	256 KB	Mali-400 (300 MHz)	2160p	H.264 1080p @ 30 fps	eLQFP176, 20×20	Tablet, E-reader	List: CCE Motion Tab TR71, OLinuXino A13 iView CyberPad, iView-420TPC, PocketBook 624 (Basic Touch)
A20	55 nm	ARMv7-A	Cortex-A7	2	256 KB	Mali-400 MP2 (350 MHz)	2160p	H.264 1080p @ 30 fps	BGA441, 19×19, 0.80	Tablet, smart TV	List: Vivaldi Tablet Cubieboard2, OLinuXino A20, MSI Primo 73, ampe a65, Apical M7098, RF M722JH, Bmorn K80, 10moons X6, Cubietruck, MarsBoard, pcDuino, Banana Pi, GoTab GBT10,
A23	40 nm	ARMv7-A	Cortex-A7	2	256 KB	Mali-400 MP2 (350 MHz)	1080p @ 60 fps multi-format	H.264 1080p @ 60 fps	BGA280, 14×14, 0.80	Tablet	Kiano SlimTab 8
A31	40 nm	ARMv7-A	Cortex-A7	4	1 MB	PowerVR SGX544 MP2 (350 MHz)	2160p 4K×2K	H.264 1080p @ 60 fps	BGA609, 18×18, 0.65	Tablet, Smartphone, smart TV	List: Readboy G50, GoClever Orion 70, Foxconn InFocus, Mele A1000G，Onda V972, Ployer MOMO19HD, Bmorn K23, Ampe A10 Flagship, Epudo ES1006Q, eSTAR CRYSTAL, Mixtile LOFT-Q
A31s	40 nm	ARMv7-A	Cortex-A7	4	1 MB	PowerVR SGX544 MP2 (350 MHz)	2160p 4K×2K	H.264 1080p @ 30 fps	BGA460, 18×18, 0.80	Phablet, Tablet, smartphone, smart TV	List: Boardcon Compact31S, iView CyberPad iView-788TPC, MSI Primo81, Teclast P88s mini, Ainol Novo 9 Firewire, Fusion5 Xtra POWER4 Tablet PC, Apical M7853, Ployer momo mini, Gajah MD7019, JWD m785, MELE AHD10A04, Texet TM-7867, HP 8
A33	40 nm	ARMv7-A	Cortex-A7	4	512 KB	Mali-400 MP2 (350 MHz)	1080p @ 60 fps multi-format	H.264 1080p @ 60 fps	BGA282, 14×14, 0.80	Tablet	OLinuXino-A33, GoTab GT97X
A40i	40 nm	ARMv7-A	Cortex-A7	4	512 KB	Mali-400 MP2 (350 MHz)	1080p @ 60 fps multi-format	H.264 1080p @ 45 fps	BGA468, 16×16, 0.65	Industrial control, Self-service terminal	Boardcon EMA40i
A80 Octa	28 nm HPM	ARMv7-A	big.LITTLE: Cortex-A15 + A7	8	2 MB + 512 KB	PowerVR G6230 (Rogue) (533 MHz)	4K×2K @30 fps, H.265/VP9 1080p @30 fps	H.264 HP/VP8 4K×2K @30 fps	FCBGA636, 19×19, 0.65	Tablet, smart TV, TV box, mini PC	List: Optimus Board, Cubieboard 4, PCDuino 8, Onda V989, ZERO Devices Z8C Alice, Tronsmart Draco AW80
A83T	28 nm HPM	ARMv7-A	Cortex-A7	8	1 MB	PowerVR SGX544 (700 MHz)	1080p @ 60 fps, H.264, HVEC MP/L5.2	H.264 1080p @ 60 fps	FCBGA345, 14×14	Tablet	InFocus CS1 A83 (C2107)
A50	28 nm HPC	ARMv7-A	Cortex-A7	4	512 KB	Mali-400 MP2	1080p @ 60 fps HEVC/H.264, 1080p @ 30 fps multi-format	H.264 1080p @ 60 fps	FBGA413, 12.3x12.8, 0.5	Tablet	
A63	28 nm HPC	ARMv8-A	Cortex-A53	4	512 KB	Mali T760	4K @ 30 fps HEVC/VP9/H.264, 1080p @ 60 fps multi-format	H.264 1080p @ 30 fps	FCBGA463, 15×15, 0.65	Tablet	
A64	40 nm	ARMv8-A	Cortex-A53	4	512 KB	Mali-400 MP2	H.264/H.265	H.264 1080p @ 60 fps	BGA396, 15×15, 0.65	Tablet, laptop, phone	OLinuXino-A64, PINE64, PinePhone
A133	28 nm HPC	ARMv8-A	Cortex-A53	4	512 KB	PowerVR GE8300	4K @ 30 fps HEVC/H.264	H.264 1080p @ 60 fps	LFBGA346, 12×12, 0.5	Tablet	
A523	22nm	ARMv8-A	Cortex-A55	8		Mali-G57	4K@60fps H.265/HEVC/VP9	4K@25fps		Tablet	

=== H-Series ===
The H-series, introduced in 2014, are primarily targeted at OTT set-top box applications.

SoC	Fab	CPU				GPU	Video Decoder	Video Encoder	Package	Application	Examples
SoC	Fab	ISA	μarch	Cores	L2 Cache	GPU	Video Decoder	Video Encoder	Package	Application	Examples
H2	40 nm	ARMv7-A	Cortex-A7	4	?	Mali-400 MP2 @ 600 MHz	1080p @ 60 fps	H.264 1080p @ 30 fps	?	OTT box, IoT, DIY boards	Orange PI Zero, NanoPi Duo, Banana Pi M2 Zero
H3	40 nm	ARMv7-A	Cortex-A7	4	512 KB	Mali-400 MP2 @ 600 MHz	1080p @ 60 fps, 4K H.265 @ 30 fps	H.264 1080p @ 30 fps	FBGA347, 14 mm × 14 mm, 0.65 mm Pitch	OTT box, IoT, DIY boards	Capcom Home Arcade, Zidoo X1, Tronsmart Draco H3, Orange Pi PC, Orange Pi One, NanoPi NEO, NanoPi Duo2, NanoPi R1
H8	28 nm HPC	ARMv7-A	Cortex-A7	8	?	PowerVR SGX544 @ 700MHZ	1080p @ 60 fps, 1080p H.265/VP9 @ 30 fps	H.264 1080p @ 60 fps	FCBGA345, 14 mm × 14 mm	OTT box, IoT, DIY boards	Cubieboard 5
H64	40 nm	ARMv8-A	Cortex-A53	4	?	Mali-400 MP2	H.264/H.265	H.264 1080p @ 60 fps	BGA396, 15 mm × 15 mm, 0.65 mm Pitch	OTT box, IoT, DIY boards	Orange Pi Win, Orange Pi Win Plus
H5	40 nm	ARMv8-A	Cortex-A53	4	512 KB	Mali-450 MP6	H.264/H.265 4k@30 fps VP8 1080p@60 fps	H.264 1080p @ 60 fps	FBGA347, 14 mm × 14 mm, 0.65 mm Pitch	OTT box, IoT, DIY boards	Orange Pi Zero Plus, Orange Pi PC2, Orange Pi Prime, NanoPi NEO2, NanoPi NEO Plus2, NanoPi Neo Core2
H6	28 nm	ARMv8-A	Cortex-A53	4	512 KB	Mali-T720 MP2 @600 MHz	H.265/HEVC 4K@60 fps H.264/AVC, VP9 4K@30 fps VP6/VP8, 1080P@60 fps	H.264 BP/MP/HP@level 4.2 4K@30 fps	BGA451, 15 mm × 15 mm, 0.65 mm pitch	OTT, DVB and IPTV markets	Zidoo H6 Pro, Orange Pi One Plus, Orange Pi Lite 2, Orange Pi 3, PINE H64 model A and B, Boardcon EMH6
H616	28 nm	ARMv8-A	Cortex-A53	4	512 KB	Mali-G31 MP2	H.265 4K@60 fps or 6K@30 fps VP9, 4K@60 fps VP8, 1080p@60 fps	H.264 BP/MP/HP 4K@25 fps	TFBGA284 14 mm × 12 mm, 0.65 mm pitch	OTT, DVB and IPTV markets	Tanix TX6s, X96 Mate, Orange Pi Zero2
H618	28 nm	ARMv8-A	Cortex-A53	4	1 MB	Mali-G31 MP2	H.265 4K@60 fps or 6K@30 fps VP9, 4K@60 fps VP8, 1080p@60 fps	H.264 BP/MP/HP 4K@25 fps	TFBGA284 14 mm × 12 mm, 0.65 mm pitch	OTT, DVB and IPTV markets	Orange Pi Zero3, Orange Pi Zero2W, T95Z Plus

=== F-Series ===
SoC	CPU	Memory	Video Decoder	Video Encoder	Package	OS	Application
F1C100	ARM9	SDR	720p	N/A	LQFP128	Melis 2.0	Car MP5, Car Headrest, Visual Bombox, Visual Radio
F1C200s	ARM9	SIP	720p	MJPEG 720 @ 30 fps	QFN88	Melis, Linux	Game Gear Micro
F1E200	ARM9	DDR	1080p	N/A	eLQFP128	Melis 2.0	E-ink Reader, PMP
F10	ARM9	DDR	1080p	N/A	LQFP176	Melis 2.0	Multimedia Box, HD Player
F13	ARM9	DDR	1080p	MPEG4 720p @ 30 fps	LQFP176	Melis 2.0	Car MP5
F18	ARM9	DDR	1080p	MPEG4 720p @ 30 fps	LQFP216	Melis 2.0	Visual Intercom System
F20	ARM9	DDR/DDR2	1080p	H.264 1080p @ 30 fps	BGA400	Car DVR, Multimedia Box, Mobile Karaoke	

=== R-Series ===
SoC	CPU				GPU	Video Decoder	Video Encoder	Package	Application	Examples
SoC	ISA	μarch	Cores	L2 Cache	GPU	Video Decoder	Video Encoder	Package	Application	Examples
R8	ARMv7-A	Cortex-A8	1	?	Mali-400 MP2	1080p@30 fps	720p@30 fps	eLQFP176	IoT, Linux on the Stick, Smart Device	$9 Next Thing Co.'s CHIP computer
R16	ARMv7-A	Cortex-A7	4	512 KB	Mali-400 MP2	1080p@60 fps	1080p@60 fps	BGA282	IoT, Security Systems	NES Classic Edition, SNES Classic Edition
R40	ARMv7-A	Cortex-A7	4	?	Mali-400 MP2	1080p@60 fps	1080p@60 fps	FBGA468	IoT, Security Systems	
R58	ARMv7-A	Cortex-A7	8	?	PowerVR SGX544 MP1	1080p@60 fps	1080p@60 fps or 720p@120 fps	FCBGA345, 14 mm × 14 mm	Hybrid PC, Tablet, Multimedia Box, HD Player	
R18	ARMv8-A	Cortex-A53	4	512 KB	Mali-400 MP2	?	?	?	?	

=== T-Series ===
SoC	CPU				GPU	Video Decoder	Video Encoder	Package	Application	Examples
SoC	ISA	μarch	Cores	L2 Cache	GPU	Video Decoder	Video Encoder	Package	Application	Examples
T2	ARMv7-A	Cortex-A7	2	?	Mali-400 MP2	1080p@30 fps	1080p@30 fps	FBGA441, 19 mm × 19 mm	In-Car Entertainment, SatNav	Nowada K1201
T3	ARMv7-A	Cortex-A7	4	512Kb	Mali-400 MP2	1080p@45 fps	1080p@45 fps	FBGA468, 16 mm × 16 mm	In-Car Entertainment, SatNav	Ezonetronics CT-0008
T8	ARMv7-A	Cortex-A7	8	?	PowerVR SGX544 MP1	1080p@60 fps	1080p@60 fps	FCBGA345, 14 mm × 14 mm	In-Car Entertainment, SatNav	Roadover T800 IX25

== Free and open-source software support ==
Due to the low price of the A10 SoC, the fact that it has a special rescue mode, and the early availability of U-Boot and Linux kernel source (through several device makers), the Allwinner SoCs have been popular among open-source software developers. Since at least 2012 the linux-sunxi community has been one of the most active ARM SoC communities, and the slightly older hardware has only very minimal dependence on firmware or blobs.

Since 2014, Allwinner is also an official member of the Linaro group, a nonprofit engineering consortium aimed at developing open-source software for the ARM architecture. However, it has been noted that most of the contributions that Allwinner has made to the Linaro group has been in the form of binary blobs, which is in clear violation of the GNU GPL license that the Linux kernel uses.

Allwinner has been accused multiple times of violating the GPL license by not providing Linux/Android kernel source code or U-Boot source, and by using LGPL-licensed code within their binary blobs, etc.

Allwinner has also been accused of including a backdoor in its published version of the Linux kernel. The backdoor allows any installed app to have full root access to the system. While this may be a remnant of debugging during the development process, it presents a significant security risk to all devices using the Allwinner provided kernel.

== See also ==
- Allwinner A1X
- Amlogic
- Actions Semiconductor
- Leadcore Technology
- MediaTek
- Nufront
- Rockchip
- UNISOC
- List of Qualcomm Snapdragon systems-on-chip
- Comparison of ARMv8-A cores
- Comparison of ARMv7-A cores
