= Samsung Galaxy Indulge =

2011 Samsung LTE mobile phone

Samsung R910 Galaxy Indulge
- Also known as: Samsung Forte and Samsung SCH-R910
- Brand: Samsung
- Manufacturer: Samsung Electronics
- Type: Smartphone
- Series: Samsung Galaxy
- First released: February 2011
- Availability by region: United States; February 2011 (MetroPCS); May 2011 (Cricket)
- Compatible networks: CDMA, LTE
- Form factor: Side-slider
- Dimensions: 132 mm × 61 mm × 15 mm (5.20 in × 2.40 in × 0.59 in)
- Weight: 152 g (5.4 oz)
- Operating system: Android 2.2 (Froyo)
- CPU: 1.0 GHz Cortex-A8 (Samsung Exynos 3 Single)
- GPU: PowerVR SGX540
- Storage: 2 GB
- Removable storage: microSDHC up to 32 GB
- Battery: 1,500 mAh Li-ion
- Rear camera: 3.0 MP, autofocus, video
- Display: 3.5 in (89 mm) TFT LCD, 320×480 px (165 ppi)
- Sound: 3.5 mm jack
- Connectivity: Wi-Fi (802.11b/g/n); Bluetooth 3.0; Micro-USB (USB 2.0); GPS
- Model: SCH-R915
- SAR: Head: 0.45 W/kg; Body: 0.60 W/kg
- Other: QWERTY keyboard, Accelerometer, Proximity sensor, Ambient light sensor

The Samusng R910 Galaxy Indulge is an Android touchscreen mobile phone released in February 2011 for the MetroPCS and May 2011 for the Cricket Wireless carrier, manufactured and designed by Samsung Electronics. It features a side-sliding QWERTY keypad, a microSC card expandable up to 32GB, a long-term evolution netork, and a three-megapixel reaar camera.

It is one of the first smartphone shipped with a 4G LTE network with metroPCS carrier.

== Specifications ==
=== Hardware ===
The Galaxy Indulge is powered by a Samsung Exynos 3 system-on-a-chip (SoC), featuring a single-core ARM Cortex-A8 processor clocked at 1000 MHz (1 GHz) and a PowerVR SGX540 graphics processing unit (GPU). The device includes 2 GB of internal memory and supports storage expansion via a microSDHC card slot, which can accommodate up to 32 GB of additional space. It is powered by a 1500 mAh lithium-ion battery. Connectivity options include Bluetooth 3.0, Wi-Fi (802.11 b, g, n), and a microUSB 2.0 port. The hardware also includes a suite of sensors: an accelerometer, ambient light sensor, and proximity sensor.

=== Display ===
Physically, the device measures 5.20 x 2.40 x 0.60 inches (132 x 61 x 15 mm) and weighs 5.35 oz (152.0 g). Its most prominent design feature is a horizontal slide-out full QWERTY keyboard. The front of the device houses a 3.5-inch TFT display with a resolution of 480x320 pixels and a pixel density of approximately 165 PPI.

=== Cameras ===
The Galaxy Indulge features a single rear-facing camera. It is equipped with a 3-megapixel sensor that includes autofocus capabilities. The camera is also capable of video recording. For physical control, the device includes a dedicated two-stage camera shutter key located on the right side of the chassis.

=== Software ===
At launch, the Galaxy Indulge ran on the Android 2.2 (Froyo) operating system. The software suite includes standard multimedia features such as a music player with background playback, album art support, and a preset equalizer. It also supports voice-activated features including voice dialing, voice commands, and voice recording. For synchronization, the software supports both manual computer sync and over-the-air (OTA) synchronization.
