= Allwinner A1X =

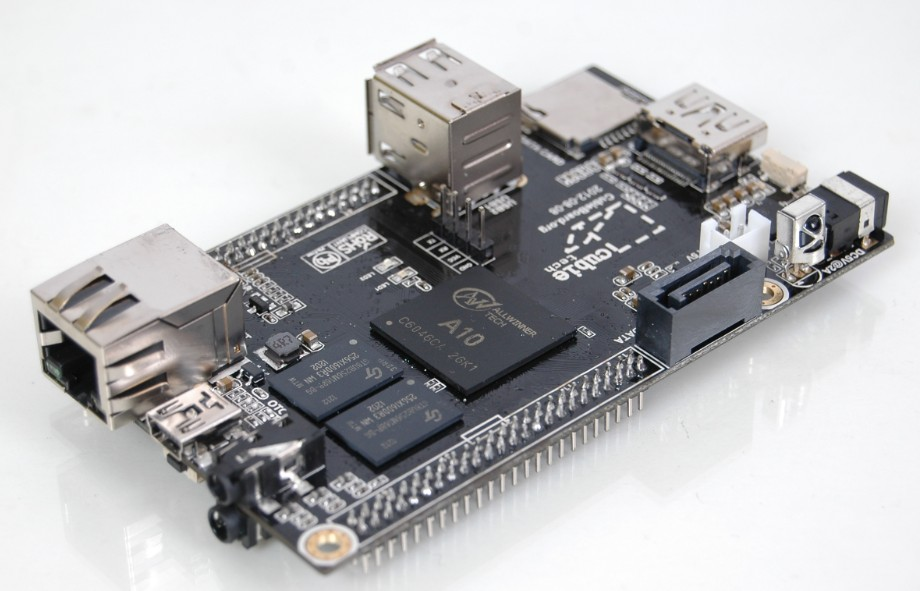
One of the many single-board computers based on the Allwinner A10 SoC.

The Allwinner A1X is a family of single-core SoC devices designed by Allwinner Technology from Zhuhai, China. Currently the family consists of the A10, A13, A10s and A12. The SoCs incorporate the ARM Cortex-A8 as their main processor and the Mali 400 as the GPU.

The Allwinner A1X is known for its ability to boot Linux distributions such as Debian, Ubuntu, Fedora, and other ARM architecture-capable distributions from an SD card, in addition to the Android OS usually installed on the flash memory of the device.

== A1x Features ==
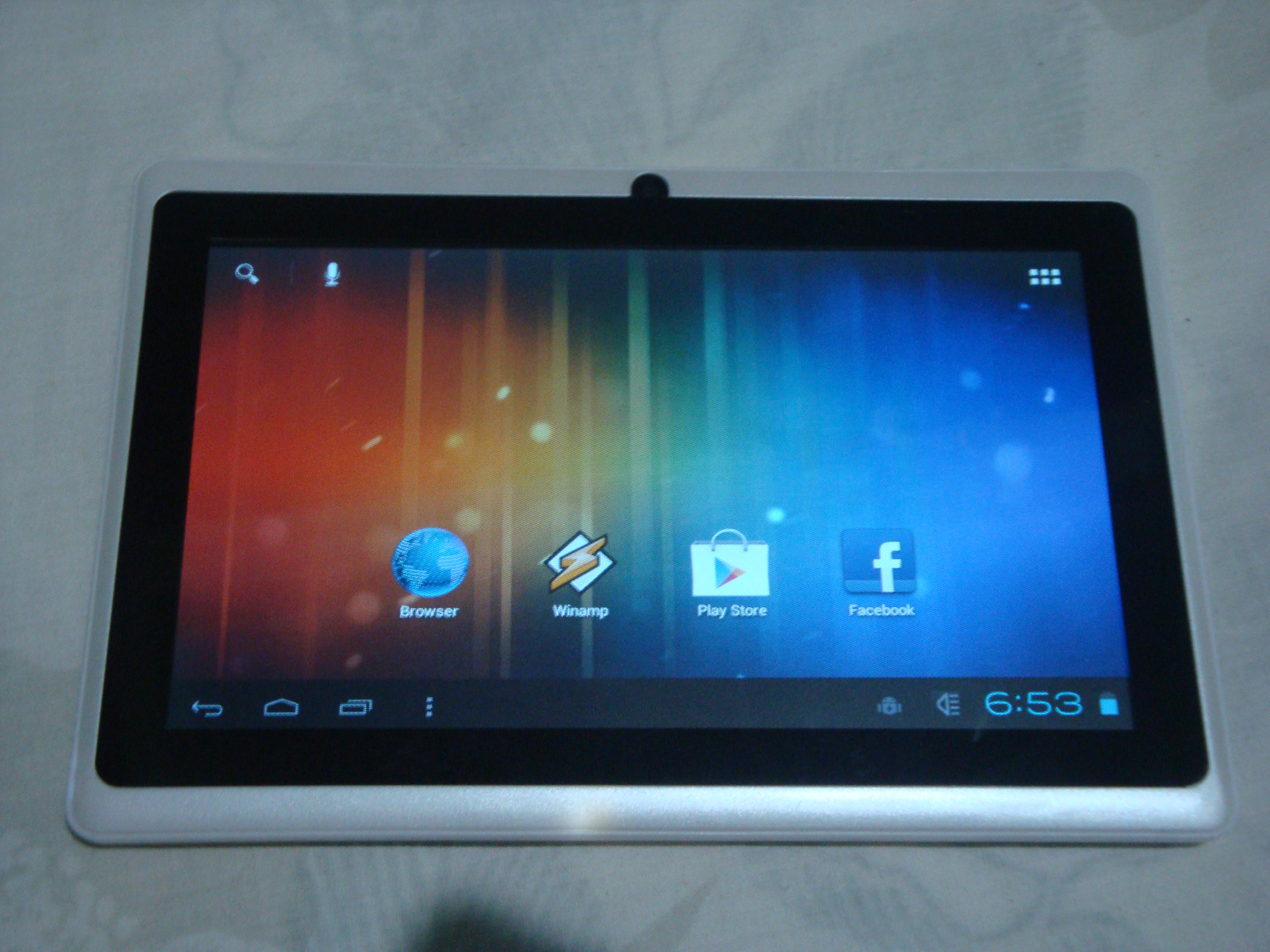
A generic tablet based on the Allwinner A13 core.

Video acceleration

- HD video decoding (up to 3840x2160)
- Supports popular video codecs, including VP8, AVS, H.264 MVC, VC-1, and MPEG-1/2/4
- HD Video Encoding (H.264 High Profile)

Display controller

- Multi-channel HD displays
- Built-in HDMI
- YPbPr, CVBS, VGA
- LCD interfaces: CPU, RGB, LVDS up to full 1080p HDTV

Memory

- DDR2/DDR3 SDRAM, 32-bit
- SLC/MLC/TLC/DDR NAND

Connectivity

- USB 2.0
- CSI, TS
- 10/100 Ethernet controller
- CAN bus (A10 only)
- Built-in SATA 2.0 Interface
- I²S, SPDIF and AC97 audio interfaces
- PS2, SPI, TWI and UART

Storage and boot devices

- NAND flash
- SPI NOR flash
- SD card
- USB
- SATA

== Implementations ==
Many manufacturers have adopted the Allwinner A1X for use in devices running the Android operating system and the Linux operating System. The Allwinner A1X is used in tablet computers, set-top boxes, PC-on-a-stick, mini-PCs, and single-board computers.

- PengPod, Linux-based 7 and 10-inch tablets.
- Gooseberry, a board based on the A10 SoC similar to the Raspberry Pi.
- Cubieboard, a board based the A10 SoC.
- Tinkerforge RED Brick, a board based on the A10s SoC
- CHIP (computer), a $9 SoC computer based on the A13

== Operating System support ==
=== Linux support ===
The Allwinner A1X architecture is referred to as 'sunxi' in the Linux kernel source tree. The source code is available at GitHub. At the moment, stable and full hardware support is limited to 3.0.x and 3.4.x kernels. Recent mainline versions of the kernel run, but do not offer NAND access and have only limited 3D-acceleration.

=== FreeBSD support ===
There is a work in progress on support Efika on FreeBSD. At the moment, not all on-board peripherals are working.

=== OpenBSD support ===
As of May 2015, OpenBSD's armv7 port supports the Cubieboard and pcDuino boards based on the Allwinner A1X.

=== NetBSD support ===
NetBSD contains support for the Allwinner A10.

== Documentation ==
No factory sourced programmer's manual is publicly available for the A10S CPU.

== Allwinner A-Series ==
Apart from the single-core A1x (A10/A13/A10s/A12), two new more powerful Cortex-A7 Allwinner SoCs have been released by Allwinner, the A10-pin-compatible dual-core Allwinner A20, and the quad-core Allwinner A31.
