= Arm Norway =

Norwegian semiconductor company

- Type: Subsidiary
- Founded: 2001 (research started in 1998)
- Headquarters: Trondheim, Norway
- Products: Semiconductor intellectual property, Mali and Immortalis GPUs
- Parent: Arm

Arm Norway is a fabless semiconductor company based in Trondheim, Norway founded in 2001, as Falanx Microsystems AS. Falanx Microsystems was spun off a 1998 research project from the Norwegian University of Science and Technology. It was acquired by ARM Holdings in June 2006, and renamed to Arm Norway.

Arm Norway works with Arm's Cambridge and Austin design centres to develop graphics processing units for OpenGL, OpenGL ES, DirectX and Vulkan three-dimensional rendering, with emphasis on low power consumption, suitable for use in portable devices like mobile phones. Their products are marketed under the Mali brand. Other Mali products include hardware acceleration for image, video and display processing.

== See also ==
- Free and open-source graphics device driver#Arm
