= Mali (processor) =

Series of graphics processing units produced by ARM Holdings

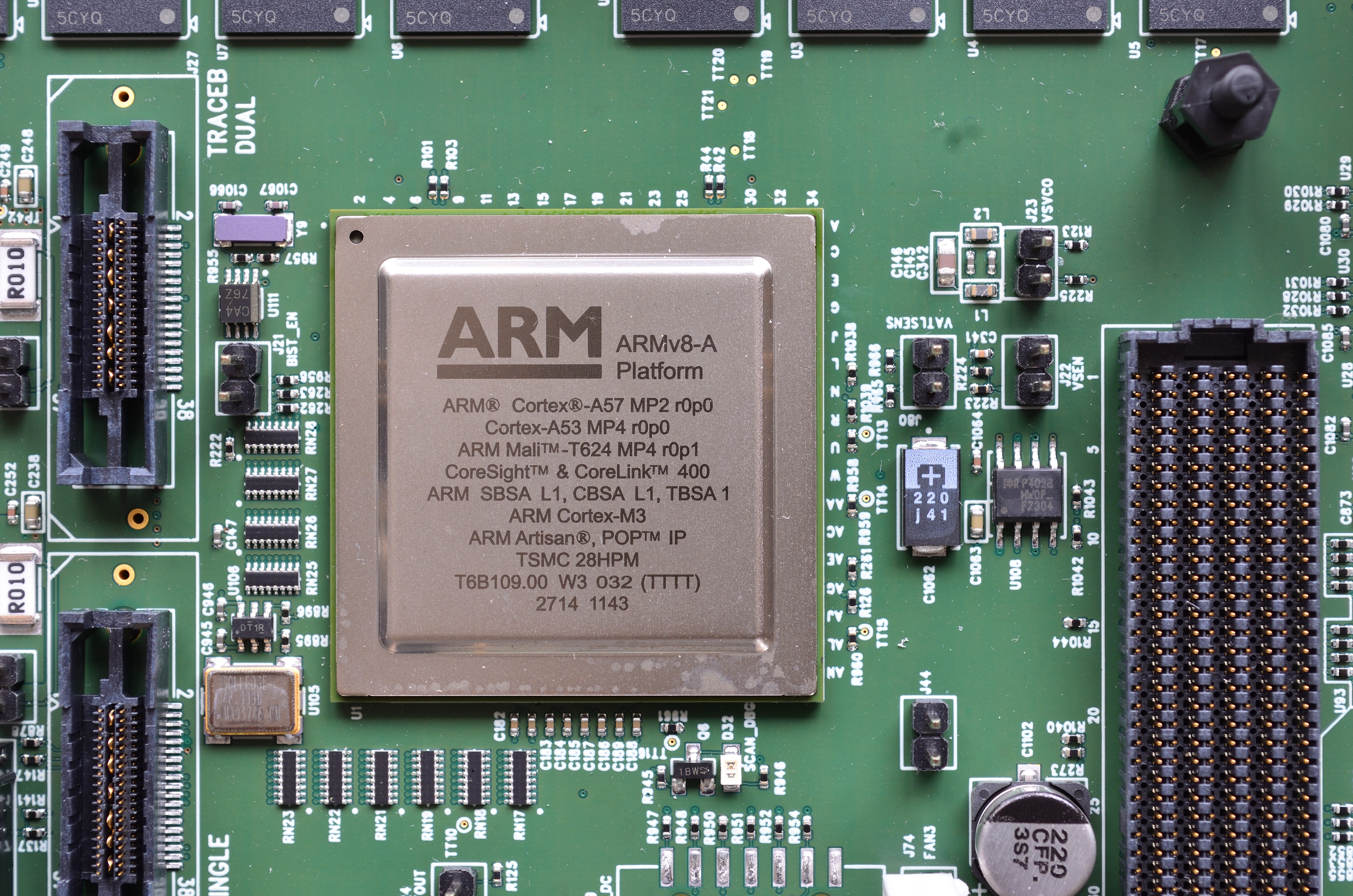
- ARM Cortex A57 A53 big.LITTLE SoC with a Mali-T624 GPU
- Release date: 2005
- Architecture: Utgard; Midgard; Bifrost; Valhall
- Models: See Variants
- Cores: 1 to 32 cores
- Fabrication process: 4 to 40 nm

API support
- Direct3D: 9 to 12
- OpenCL: 1.1 to 3.0
- OpenGL: 2.0 to 3.0
- Vulkan: 1.0 to 1.3

The Mali and Immortalis series of graphics processing units (GPUs) and multimedia processors are semiconductor intellectual property cores produced by Arm Holdings for licensing in various ASIC designs by Arm partners.

Mali GPUs were developed by Falanx Microsystems A/S, which was a spin-off of a research project from the Norwegian University of Science and Technology. Arm Holdings acquired Falanx Microsystems A/S on 23 June 2006 and renamed the company to Arm Norway.

It was originally named Malaik, but the team shortened the name to Mali, Serbo-Croatian for "small", which was thought to be fitting for a mobile GPU.

On 28 June 2022, Arm announced their Immortalis series of GPUs with hardware-based ray tracing support.

== Graphics processors ==
=== Utgard ===
In 2005, Falanx announced their Utgard GPU Architecture, the Mali-200 GPU. Arm followed up with the Mali-300, Mali-400, Mali-450, and Mali-470. Utgard was a non-unified GPU (discrete pixel and vertex shaders).

Comparison of Mali Utgard graphics processing units
Model	Launch date	Type	EUs/Shader core count	Core clock rate (MHz)	L2 cache size	Fillrate			GFLOPS (per core)	OpenGL ES
Model	Launch date	Type	EUs/Shader core count	Core clock rate (MHz)	L2 cache size	M△/s	GT/s	(GP/s)	GFLOPS (per core)	OpenGL ES
Mali-55/110	2005	Fixed function pipeline	1			2.8		0.1	?	1.1
Mali-200	2007	Programmable pipeline	1			5	?	0.2		2.0
Mali-300	2010	Programmable pipeline	1	500	8 KiB	55		0.5	5	2.0
Mali-400 MP	2008	Programmable pipeline	1–4	200–600	8–256 KiB	55		0.5	1.2–5.4	2.0
Mali-450 MP	2012	Programmable pipeline	1–8	300–750	8–512 KiB	142		2.6	4.5–11.9	2.0
Mali-470 MP	2015	Programmable pipeline	1–4	250–650	8–256 KiB	71		0.65	8–20.8	2.0

=== Midgard ===
==== 1st generation ====
On 10 November 2010, Arm announced their Midgard 1st gen GPU Architecture, including the Mali-T604 and later the Mali-T658 GPU in 2011. Midgard uses a Hierarchical Tiling system.

==== 2nd generation ====
On 6 August 2012, Arm announced their Midgard 2nd gen GPU Architecture, including the Mali-T678 GPU. Midgard 2nd gen introduced Forward Pixel Kill.

==== 3rd generation ====
On 29 October 2013, Arm announced their Midgard 3rd gen GPU Architecture, including the Mali-T760 GPU.

==== 4th generation ====
On October 27, 2014, Arm announced their Midgard 4th gen GPU Architecture, including the Mali-T860, Mali-T830, Mali-T820. Their flagship Mali-T880 GPU was announced on February 3, 2015. New microarchitectural features include:

- Up to 16 cores for the Mali-T880, with 256KB – 2MB L2 cache

=== Bifrost ===
==== 1st generation ====
On 27 May 2016, Arm announced their Bifrost GPU Architecture, including the Mali-G71 GPU. New microarchitectural features include:

- Unified shaders with quad vectorization
- Scalar ISA
- Clauses execution
- Full cache coherency
- Up to 32 cores for the Mali-G71, with 128KB – 2MB L2 cache
- Arm claims the Mali-G71 has 40% more performance density and 20% better energy efficiency than the Mali-T880

==== 2nd generation ====
On 29 May 2017, Arm announced their Bifrost 2nd gen GPU Architecture, including the Mali-G72 GPU. New microarchitectural features include:

- Arithmetic optimizations and increased caches
- Up to 32 cores for the Mali-G72, with 128KB – 2MB L2 cache
- Arm claims the Mali-G72 has 20% more performance density and 25% better energy efficiency than the Mali-G71

==== 3rd generation ====
On 31 May 2018, Arm announced their Bifrost 3rd gen GPU Architecture, including the Mali-G76 GPU. New microarchitectural features include:

- 8 execution lanes per engine (up from 4). Doubled pixel and texel throughput
- Up to 20 cores for the Mali-G76, with 512KB – 4MB L2 cache
- Arm claims the Mali-G76 has 30% more performance density and 30% better energy efficiency than the Mali-G72

=== Valhall ===
==== 1st generation ====
On 27 May 2019, Arm announced their Valhall GPU Architecture, including the Mali-G77 GPU, and in October Mali-G57 GPUs. New microarchitectural features include:

- New superscalar engine
- Simplified scalar ISA
- New dynamic scheduling
- Up to 16 cores for the Mali-G77, with 512KB – 2MB L2 cache
- Arm claims the Mali-G77 has 30% more performance density and 30% better energy efficiency than the Mali-G76

==== 2nd generation ====
On 26 May 2020, Arm announced their Valhall 2nd Gen GPU Architecture, including the Mali-G78. New microarchitectural features include:

- Asynchronous clock domains
- New FMA units and increase Tiler throughput
- Up to 24 cores for the Mali-G78, with 512KB – 2MB L2 cache
- Arm Frame Buffer Compression (AFBC)
- Arm claims the Mali-G78 has 15% more performance density and 10% better energy efficiency than the Mali-G77

==== 3rd generation ====
On 25 May 2021, Arm announced their Valhall 3rd Gen GPU Architecture (as part of TCS21), including the Mali-G710, Mali-G510, and Mali-G310 GPUs. New microarchitectural features include:

- Larger shader cores (2x compared to Valhall 2nd Gen)
- New GPU frontend, Command Stream Frontend (CSF) replaces the Job Manager
- Up to 16 cores for the Mali-G710, with 512KB – 2MB L2 cache
- Arm claims the Mali-G710 has 20% more performance density and 20% better energy efficiency than the Mali-G78

==== 4th generation ====
On 28 June 2022, Arm announced their Valhall 4th Gen GPU Architecture (as part of TCS22), including the Immortalis-G715, Mali-G715, and Mali-G615 GPUs. New microarchitectural features include:

- Ray Tracing support (hardware-based)
- Variable Rate Shading
- New Execution Engine, with doubled the FMA block, Matrix Multiply instruction support, and PPA improvements
- Arm Fixed Rate Compression (AFRC)
- Arm claims the Immortalis-G715 has 15% more performance & 15% better energy efficiency than the Mali-G710

==== 5th generation ====
On 29 May 2023, Arm announced their 5th Gen Arm GPU Architecture (as part of TCS23), including the Immortalis-G720, Mali-G720 and Mali-G620 GPUs. New microarchitectural features include:

- Deferred vertex shading (DVS) pipeline
- Arm claims the Immortalis-G720 has 15% more performance and uses up to 40% less memory bandwidth than the Immortalis-G715

=== Technical details ===
Like other embedded IP cores for 3D rendering acceleration, the Mali GPU does not include display controllers driving monitors, in contrast to common desktop video cards. Instead, the Mali ARM core is a pure 3D engine that renders graphics into memory and passes the rendered image over to another core to handle display.

ARM does, however, license display controller SIP cores independently of the Mali 3D accelerator SIP block, e.g. Mali DP500, DP550 and DP650.

ARM also supplies tools to help in authoring OpenGL ES shaders named Mali GPU Shader Development Studio and Mali GPU User Interface Engine.

Display controllers such as the ARM HDLCD display controller are available separately.

=== Variants ===
The Mali core grew out of the cores previously produced by Falanx and currently constitute:

Model	Microarchi- tecture	Type	Launch date	EUs/shader core count	Shading units (per core)	Total shaders	Fab (nm)	Die size (mm^{2})	Core clock rate (MHz)	L2 cache size (KiB)	Fillrate			GFLOPS (per core)	GFLOPS (total)	API (version)		
Model	Microarchi- tecture	Type	Launch date	EUs/shader core count	Shading units (per core)	Total shaders	Fab (nm)	Die size (mm^{2})	Core clock rate (MHz)	L2 cache size (KiB)	M△/s	GT/s	(GP/s)	GFLOPS (per core)	GFLOPS (total)	Vulkan	OpenGL ES	OpenCL
Mali-T604	Midgard 1st gen	Unified shader model + SIMD ISA	Nov 2010	1–4	8	8–32	32; 28	?	533	32–256	133	0.6 @ 600 MHz		9.6 @ 600 MHz	9.6–38.4 @ 600 MHz	—N/a	3.1	1.1 Full Profile
Mali-T658	Midgard 1st gen	Unified shader model + SIMD ISA	Nov 2011	1–8	16	16–128	?	?		32–256	?			19.2 @ 600 MHz	19.2–153.6 @ 600 MHz	—N/a	3.1	1.1 Full Profile
Mali-T622	Midgard 2nd gen	Unified shader model + SIMD ISA	Jun 2013	1–2	4	4–8	32; 28	?	533	32–256	?		?	4.8 @ 600 MHz	4.8–9.6 @ 600 MHz	—N/a	3.1	1.1 Full Profile
Mali-T624	Midgard 2nd gen	Unified shader model + SIMD ISA	Aug 2012	1–4	8	8–32	32; 28	?	533–600	32–256	?		?	9.6 @ 600 MHz	9.6–38.4 @ 600 MHz	—N/a	3.1	1.1 Full Profile
Mali-T628	Midgard 2nd gen	Unified shader model + SIMD ISA	Aug 2012	1–8	16	16–128	32; 28	?	533–695	32–256	?		?	19.2 @ 600 MHz	19.2–153.6 @ 600 MHz	—N/a	3.1	1.1 Full Profile
Mali-T678	Midgard 2nd gen	Unified shader model + SIMD ISA	Aug 2012	1–8			28	?	?	32–256	?		?			—N/a	3.1	1.1 Full Profile
Mali-T720	Midgard 3rd gen	Unified shader model + SIMD ISA	Oct 2013	1–8	10	10–80	28; 14; 10	?	400–700	32–256	600 (MP8@ 600 MHz)	0.6 @ 600 MHz		12 @ 600 MHz	12–96 @ 600 MHz	—N/a	3.1	1.1 Full Profile
Mali-T760	Midgard 3rd gen	Unified shader model + SIMD ISA	Oct 2013	1–16	14	14–224	28; 20; 14	1.75 mm^{2} per shader core at 14 nm	600–772	256–2048	1300	0.6 @ 600 MHz		16.8 @ 600 MHz	16.8–268.8 @ 600 MHz	1.0	3.2	1.2 Full Profile
Mali-T820	Midgard 4th gen	Unified shader model + SIMD ISA	Q4 2015	1–4	8	8–32	28	?	600	32–256	400	0.6 @ 600 MHz		9.6 @ 600 MHz	9.6–38.4 @ 600 MHz	1.0	3.2	1.2 Full Profile
Mali-T830	Midgard 4th gen	Unified shader model + SIMD ISA	Q4 2015	1–4	16	16–64	28; 16; 14	?	600–950	32–256	400	0.6 @ 600 MHz		19.2 @ 600 MHz	19.2–76.8 @ 600 MHz	1.0	3.2	1.2 Full Profile
Mali-T860	Midgard 4th gen	Unified shader model + SIMD ISA	Q4 2015	1–16	14	14–224	28; 16; 14	?	350–700	256–2048	1300	0.6 @ 600 MHz		16.8 @ 600 MHz	16.8–268.8 @ 600 MHz	1.0	3.2	1.2 Full Profile
Mali-T880	Midgard 4th gen	Unified shader model + SIMD ISA	Q2 2016	1–16	21	21–351	20; 16; 14	?	650–1000	256–2048	1700	0.6 @ 600 MHz		25.2 @ 600 MHz	25.2–403.2 @ 600 MHz	1.0	3.2	1.2 Full Profile
Mali-G31	Bifrost 1st gen	Unified shader model + Unified memory + scalar, clause-based ISA	Q1 2018	1–6	4 or 8	4–48	28; 12	?	650	32–512		0.5 @ 1000 MHz		8–16 @ 1000 MHz	48–576 @ 1000 MHz	1.2	3.2	2.0 Full Profile
Mali-G51	Bifrost 1st gen	Unified shader model + Unified memory + scalar, clause-based ISA	Q4 2016	1–6	8 or 12	8–72	28; 16; 14; 12; 10	?	1000	32–512		0.5 @ 1000 MHz		16–24 @ 1000 MHz	16–144 @ 1000 MHz	1.0	3.2	2.0 Full Profile
Mali-G71	Bifrost 1st gen	Unified shader model + Unified memory + scalar, clause-based ISA	Q2 2016	1–32	12	12–384	16; 14; 10	?	546–1037	128–2048	1850	1 @ 1000 MHz		24 @ 1000 MHz	24–768 @ 1000 MHz	1.0	3.2	2.0 Full Profile
Mali-G52	Bifrost 2nd gen	Unified shader model + Unified memory + scalar, clause-based ISA	Q1 2018	1–6	16 or 24	16–144	16; 12; 8; 7	?	850	32-512		2 @ 1000 MHz		32–48 @ 1000 MHz	32–288 @ 1000 MHz	1.0	3.2	2.1 Full Profile
Mali-G72	Bifrost 2nd gen	Unified shader model + Unified memory + scalar, clause-based ISA	Q2 2017	1–32	12	12–384	16; 12; 10	1.36 mm^{2} per shader core at 10 nm	572–1050	128–2048		1 @ 1000 MHz		24 @ 1000 MHz	24–768 @ 1000 MHz	1.0	3.2	2.0 Full Profile
Mali-G76	Bifrost 3rd gen	Unified shader model + Unified memory + scalar, clause-based ISA	Q2 2018	4–20	24	96–480	12; 8; 7	?	600–800	512–4096	?	2 @ 1000 MHz	2 @ 1000 MHz	48 @ 1000 MHz	192–960 @ 1000 MHz	1.1	3.2	2.1 Full Profile
Mali-G57	Valhall 1st gen	Superscalar engine + Unified memory + simplified scalar ISA	Q2 2019	1–6	32	32–192	12; 7; 6	?	950	64–512	?	4 @ 1000 MHz	2 @ 1000 MHz	64 @ 1000 MHz	64–384 @ 1000 MHz	1.1	3.2	2.1 Full Profile
Mali-G77	Valhall 1st gen	Superscalar engine + Unified memory + simplified scalar ISA	Q2 2019	7–16	32	224–512	7; 6	?	695–850	512–2048	?	4 @ 1000 MHz	2 @ 1000 MHz	64 @ 1000 MHz	448–1024 @ 1000 MHz	1.1	3.2	2.1 Full Profile
Mali-G68	Valhall 2nd gen	Superscalar engine + Unified memory + simplified scalar ISA	Q2 2020	1–6	32	32–192	6; 5; 3			512–2048		4 @ 1000 MHz	2 @ 1000 MHz	64 @ 1000 MHz	64–384 @ 1000 MHz	1.2	3.2	3.0 Full Profile
Mali-G78	Valhall 2nd gen	Superscalar engine + Unified memory + simplified scalar ISA	Q2 2020	7–24	32	224–768	5		759-848	512–2048		4 @ 1000 MHz	2 @ 1000 MHz	64 @ 1000 MHz	448–1536 @ 1000 MHz	1.2	3.2	3.0 Full Profile
Mali-G310	Valhall 3rd gen	Superscalar engine + Unified memory + simplified scalar ISA	Q2 2021	1	16 or 32 or 64	16–64	6; 5; 4			256–1024		2, 4 or 8 @ 1000 MHz	2 or 4 @ 1000 MHz	32–128 @ 1000 MHz		1.2	3.2	3.0 Full Profile
Mali-G510	Valhall 3rd gen	Superscalar engine + Unified memory + simplified scalar ISA	Q2 2021	2–6	48 or 64	96–384	6; 5; 4			256–1024		4 or 8 @ 1000 MHz	4 @ 1000 MHz	96–128 @ 1000 MHz	192–768 @ 1000 MHz	1.2	3.2	3.0 Full Profile
Mali-G610	Valhall 3rd gen	Superscalar engine + Unified memory + simplified scalar ISA	Q2 2021	1–6	64	64–384	6; 5; 4			512–2048		8 @ 1000 MHz	4 @ 1000 MHz	128 @ 1000 MHz	128–768 @ 1000 MHz	1.2	3.2	3.0 Full Profile
Mali-G710	Valhall 3rd gen	Superscalar engine + Unified memory + simplified scalar ISA	Q2 2021	7–16	64	448–1024	6; 5; 4		650,850; 900	512–2048	2648	8 @ 1000 MHz	4 @ 1000 MHz	128 @ 1000 MHz	896–2048 @ 1000 MHz	1.2	3.2	3.0 Full Profile
Mali-G615	Valhall 4th gen	Superscalar engine + Unified memory + simplified scalar ISA	Q2 2022	1–6	128	128–768	4			512–2048		8 @ 1000 MHz	4 @ 1000 MHz	256 @ 1000 MHz	256–1536 @ 1000 MHz	1.3	3.2	3.0 Full Profile
Mali-G715	Valhall 4th gen	Superscalar engine + Unified memory + simplified scalar ISA	Q2 2022	7–9	128	896–1152	4			512–2048		8 @ 1000 MHz	4 @ 1000 MHz	256 @ 1000 MHz	1792–2304 @ 1000 MHz	1.3	3.2	3.0 Full Profile
Immortalis-G715	Valhall 4th gen	Superscalar engine + Unified memory + simplified scalar ISA	Q2 2022	10–16	128	1280–2048	4			512–2048		8 @ 1000 MHz	4 @ 1000 MHz	256 @ 1000 MHz	2560–4096 @ 1000 MHz	1.3	3.2	3.0 Full Profile
Mali-G620	5th Gen	Deferred Vertex Shading (DVS)	Q2 2023	1–5	128	128–640	4			256–1024		8 @ 1000 MHz	4 @ 1000 MHz	256 @ 1000 MHz	256–1280 @ 1000 MHz	1.3	3.2	3.0 Full Profile
Mali-G720	5th Gen	Deferred Vertex Shading (DVS)	Q2 2023	6–9	128	768–1152	4			512–2048		8 @ 1000 MHz	4 @ 1000 MHz	256 @ 1000 MHz	1536–2304 @ 1000 MHz	1.3	3.2	3.0 Full Profile
Immortalis-G720	5th Gen	Deferred Vertex Shading (DVS)	Q4 2023	10–16	128	1280–2048	4			512–2048		8 @ 1000 MHz	4 @ 1000 MHz	256 @ 1000 MHz	2560–4096 @ 1000; MHz	1.3	3.2	3.0 Full Profile
Mali-G625	5th Gen	Deferred Vertex Shading (DVS)	Q2 2024	1–5	128	128–640	4; 3			256–1024		8 @ 1000 MHz	4 @ 1000 MHz	256 @ 1000 MHz	256–1280 @ 1000 MHz	1.3	3.2	3.0 Full Profile
Mali-G725	5th Gen	Deferred Vertex Shading (DVS)	Q2 2024	6–9	128	768–1152	4; 3			512–4096		8 @ 1000 MHz	4 @ 1000 MHz	256 @ 1000 MHz	1536–2304 @ 1000 MHz	1.3	3.2	3.0 Full Profile
Immortalis-G925	5th Gen	Deferred Vertex Shading (DVS)	Q2 2024	10–24	128	1280–3072	4; 3			512–4096		8 @ 1000 MHz	4 @ 1000 MHz	256 @ 1000 MHz	2560–6144 @ 1000; MHz	1.3	3.2	3.0 Full Profile
Mali G1-Pro	5th Gen	Deferred Vertex Shading (DVS)	Q3 2025	1–5	128	128–640	3			512–2048		8 @ 1000 MHz	4 @ 1000 MHz	256 @ 1000 MHz	256–1280 @ 1000 MHz	1.4	3.2	3.0 Full Profile
Mali G1-Premium	5th Gen	Deferred Vertex Shading (DVS)	Q3 2025	6–9	128	768–1152	3			512–4096		8 @ 1000 MHz	4 @ 1000 MHz	256 @ 1000 MHz	1536–2304 @ 1000 MHz	1.4	3.2	3.0 Full Profile
Mali G1-Ultra	5th Gen	Deferred Vertex Shading (DVS)	Q3 2025	10–24	128	1280–3072	3			512–4096		8 @ 1000 MHz	4 @ 1000 MHz	256 @ 1000 MHz	2560–6144 @ 1000; MHz	1.4	3.2	3.0 Full Profile
Mali G2-Pro		Deferred Vertex Shading (DVS)	Q3 2026	1–5	128	128–640				2048–16384		8 @ 1000 MHz	4 @ 1000 MHz	256 @ 1000 MHz	256–1280 @ 1000 MHz	1.4	3.2	3.0 Full Profile
Mali G2-Premium		Deferred Vertex Shading (DVS)	Q3 2026	6–9	128	768–1152				2048–16384		8 @ 1000 MHz	4 @ 1000 MHz	256 @ 1000 MHz	1536–2304 @ 1000 MHz	1.4	3.2	3.0 Full Profile
Mali G2-Ultra		Deferred Vertex Shading (DVS)	Q3 2026	10–24	128	1280–3072	3; 2			2048–16384		8 @ 1000 MHz	4 @ 1000 MHz	256 @ 1000 MHz	2560–6144 @ 1000; MHz	1.4	3.2	3.0 Full Profile
Model	Microarchi- tecture	Type	Launch date	EUs/Shader core count	Shading Units (per core)	Total Shaders	Fab (nm)	Die size (mm^{2})	Core clock rate (MHz)	Max L2 cache size (KiB)	Fillrate (per core)			FP32 GFLOPS (per core)	GFLOPS (total)	Vulkan	Open GL/ES	Open CL

Some microarchitectures (or just some chips?) support cache coherency for the L2 cache with the CPU.

Adaptive Scalable Texture Compression (ASTC) is supported by Mali-T620, T720/T760, T820/T830/T860/T880 and Mali-G series.

=== Implementations ===
The Mali GPU variants can be found in the following systems on chips (SoCs):

Vendor	SoC name	Mali version
Allwinner	Allwinner A1X (A10, A10s, A13)	Mali-400 MP @ 300 MHz
Allwinner	A20, A23, A33, A64, H2, H3, H64, R8, R16, R40, R18	Mali-400 MP2 @ 350/350/350/600/600/?/?/?/?/?/? MHz
Allwinner	H5	Mali-450 MP4
Allwinner	H6	Mali-T720 MP2
Allwinner	H313, H616, H618	Mali-G31 MP2
Amlogic	8726-M series (8726-M1, 8726-M3, 8726-M6, 8726-MX)	Mali-400 MP/MP2 @ 250/400 MHz
Amlogic	8726-M8 series (M801, M802, S801, S802, S812)	Mali-450 MP6 @ 600 MHz
Amlogic	8726-M8B series (M805, S805)	Mali-450 MP2 @ 500 MHz
Amlogic	S905, S905X/D/L	Mali-450 MP3 @ 750 MHz
Amlogic	S905X2, S905X3, S905Y2, S905D2, S905X4	Mali-G31 MP2
Amlogic	S905X5	Mali-G310 @ 1 GHz
Amlogic	S912	Mali-T820 MP3 @ 600 MHz
Amlogic	S922X, A311D	Mali-G52 MP4
Amlogic	T966	Mali-T830 MP2 @ 650 MHz
ARM	Morello	Mali-G76
Baikal Electronics	Baikal-M	Mali-T628 MP8
CSR	Quatro 5300 Series	Mali-400 MP
ELVEES Multicore	1892VM14Ya	Mali-300
InfoTM	iMAP×15	Mali-400
InfoTM	iMAP×820	Mali-400 MP2
InfoTM	iMAP×912	Mali-400 MP2
Google	Tensor	Mali-G78 MP20 @ 848(996) MHz
Google	Tensor G2	Mali-G710 MP7 @ 848(996) MHz
Google	Tensor G3	Mali-G715 MP7 @ 890(900) MHz
Google	Tensor G4	Mali-G715 MP7 @ 940 MHz
HiSilicon	Kirin 620	Mali-450 MP4 @ 533 MHz
HiSilicon	Kirin 650/655/658/659	Mali-T830 MP2 @ 900 MHz
HiSilicon	Kirin 710	Mali-G51 MP4 @ 1000 MHz
HiSilicon	Kirin 810	Mali-G52 MP6 @ 820 MHz
HiSilicon	Kirin 820	Mali-G57 MP6 @??? MHz
HiSilicon	Kirin 910/910T	Mali-450 MP4 @ 533/700 MHz
HiSilicon	Kirin 920/925/928	Mali-T628 MP4 @ 600/600/? MHz
HiSilicon	Kirin 930/935	Mali-T628 MP4 @ 600/680 MHz
HiSilicon	Kirin 950/955	Mali-T880 MP4 @ 900 MHz
HiSilicon	Kirin 960	Mali-G71 MP8 @ 1037 MHz
HiSilicon	Kirin 970	Mali-G72 MP12 @ 746 MHz
HiSilicon	Kirin 980	Mali-G76 MP10 @ 720 MHz
HiSilicon	Kirin 985	Mali-G77 MP8 @??? MHz
HiSilicon	Kirin 990/990 5G	Mali-G76 MP16 @ 600 MHz
HiSilicon	Kirin 9000 5G/Kirin 9000E 5G	Mali-G78 MP24/22 @ 759 MHz
HiSilicon	Hi3798cv200	Mali-T720 @ 450/600 MHz
Leadcore	LC1810, LC1811, LC1813, LC1913	Mali-400
Leadcore	LC1860, LC1860C, LC1960	Mali-T628 MP2 @ 600 MHz
MediaTek	MSD6683	Mali-470 MP3
MediaTek	MT5595, MT5890	Mali-T624 MP3
MediaTek	MT5596, MT5891	Mali-T860 MP2
MediaTek	MT6571, MT6572, MT6572M	Mali-400 MP1 @ ?/500/400 MHz
MediaTek	MT6580	Mali-400 MP1 @ 500 MHz
MediaTek	MT6582/MT6582M	Mali-400 MP2 @ 500/416 MHz
MediaTek	MT6588, MT6591, MT6592, MT6592M, MT8127	Mali-450 MP4 @ 600/700/600/600 MHz
MediaTek	MT6735, MT6735M, MT6735P	Mali-T720 MP2 @ 600/500/400 MHz
MediaTek	MT6737, MT6737T	Mali-T720 MP2 @ 550/600 MHz
MediaTek	MT8735	Mali-T720 MP2 @ 450 MHz
MediaTek	MT6753	Mali-T720 MP3 @ 700 MHz
MediaTek	MT6732, MT6732M, MT6752, MT6752M	Mali-T760 MP2 @ 500/500/700/700 MHz
MediaTek	MT6750	Mali-T860 MP2 @ 520 MHz
MediaTek	MT6755 (Helio P10/P15/P18)	Mali-T860 MP2 @ 700/650/800 MHz
MediaTek	MT6757 (Helio P20, P25)	Mali-T880 MP2 @ 900 MHz/1.0 GHz
MediaTek	MT6797 (Helio X20/X23/X25/X27)	Mali-T880 MP4 @ 780/850/875 MHz
MediaTek	MT6763T (Helio P23), MT6758 (Helio P30)	Mali-G71 MP2 @ 770/950 MHz
MediaTek	MT6771 (Helio P60, P70)	Mali-G72 MP3 @ 800/900 MHz
MediaTek	MT6768 (Helio P65), MT6769 (Helio G70/G80/G81/G85/G88/G91/G92)	Mali-G52 MC2 @ 820/950/1000 MHz
MediaTek	MT6781 (Helio G96)	Mali-G57 MC2 @ 950 MHz
MediaTek	MT6785 (Helio G90/G90T/G95)	Mali-G76 MC4 @ 720/800/900 MHz
MediaTek	MT6789 (Helio G99/G100/G200)	Mali-G57 MC2 @ 1 GHz/1.1 GHz
MediaTek	MT6833 (Dimensity 700, 810, 6020)	Mali-G57 MC2 @ 950/1068/950 MHz
MediaTek	MT6853 (Dimensity 720, 800U)	Mali-G57 MC3 @ 850 MHz
MediaTek	MT6873 (Dimensity 800)	Mali-G57 MC4 @ 650 MHz
MediaTek	MT6875 (Dimensity 820), MT6883Z (Dimensity 1000C)	Mali-G57 MC5 @ 900 MHz
MediaTek	MT6877/MT6877T (Dimensity 900/920/1080/7050)	Mali-G68 MC4 @ 900 MHz
MediaTek	MT6885Z (Dimensity 1000L)	Mali-G77 MC7 @ 695 MHz
MediaTek	MT6889 (Dimensity 1000/1000+)	Mali-G77 MC9 @ 850 MHz
MediaTek	MT6891/MT6893 (Dimensity 1100/1200/1300/8020/8050)	Mali-G77 MC9 @ 850 MHz
MediaTek	MT8192 (Kompanio 820)	Mali-G57 MC5 GPU @ ??? MHz
MediaTek	Kompanio 838	Mali-G57 MC3
MediaTek	MT8195/MT8195T (Kompanio 1200/1380)	Mali-G57 MC5 GPU @ ??? MHz
MediaTek	MT8791 (Kompanio 900T)	Mali-G68 MP4 GPU @ 900 MHz
MediaTek	MT8797 (Kompanio 1300T)	Mali-G77 MP9 @ 850 MHz
MediaTek	MT6886 (Dimensity 7200)	Mali-G610 MC4 @ 1.13 GHz
MediaTek	MT6878 (Dimensity 7300/7300X)	Mali-G615 MC2 @ 1.05 GHz
MediaTek	MT6895/MT6895Z/MT6896 (Dimensity 8000/8100/8200)	Mali-G610 MC6 @ 700/860/950 MHz
MediaTek	MT6897 (Dimensity 8300/8350)	Mali-G615 MC6 @ 1400 MHz
MediaTek	MT6899 (Dimensity 8400/8450)	Mali-G720 MC7 @ 1300 MHz
MediaTek	MT6983 (Dimensity 9000/9000+)	Mali-G710 MP10 @ 848/950 MHz
MediaTek	MT6985 (Dimensity 9200/9200+)	Immortalis-G715 MP11 @ 981/1150 MHz
MediaTek	MT6989 (Dimensity 9300)	Immortalis-G720 MP12 @ 1.3 GHz
MediaTek	Dimensity 9400	Immortalis-G925 MP12
MediaTek	MT6993 (Dimensity 9500)	Mali-G1 Ultra MC12 @ 1716 MHz
NetLogic	Au1380, Au1350	Mali-200
Nufront	NS2816, NS2816M	Mali-400 MP
Nufront	NS115, TL7688, TL7689	Mali-400 MP2
NXP	i.MX95	Mali-G310 MP1
Realtek	RTD1294, RTD1295, RTD1296	Mali-T820 MP3
Realtek	RTD1395	Mali-470
Rockchip	RK2818	Mali-200
Rockchip	RK2926, RK2628, RK3036, RK3229	Mali-400 MP @ 400/400/500/600 MHz
Rockchip	RK3026, RK3126, RK3128	Mali-400 MP2 @ 500/600/600 MHz
Rockchip	RK3066, RK3188, RK3188T	Mali-400 MP4 @ 266/533/~400 MHz
Rockchip	RK3288	Mali-T760 MP4 @ 600 MHz
Rockchip	RK3326	Mali-G31 MP2
Rockchip	RK3328	Mali-450 MP2
Rockchip	RK3399	Mali-T860 MP4 @ 600 MHz
Rockchip	RK3566, RK3568	Mali-G52 MC1 @ 800 MHz
Rockchip	RK3576	Mali-G52 MC3 @ 1000 MHz
Rockchip	RK3588	Mali-G610 MC4 @ 1000 MHz
Samsung	Exynos 3 Quad 3470	Mali-400 MP4 @ 450 MHz
Samsung	Exynos 3 Quad 3475	Mali-T720 @ 600 MHz
Samsung	Exynos 4 Dual 4210	Mali-400 MP4 @ 266 MHz
Samsung	Exynos 4 Dual 4212	Mali-400 MP4 @ 400 MHz
Samsung	Exynos 3 Quad 4412/4415	Mali-400 MP4 @ 533 MHz
Samsung	Exynos 5 Dual 5250	Mali-T604 MP4 @ 533 MHz
Samsung	Exynos 5 Hexa 5260	Mali-T624 MP4 @ 600 MHz
Samsung	Exynos 5 Octa 5420/5422	Mali-T628 MP6 @ 533 MHz
Samsung	Exynos 5 Octa 5430/5800	Mali-T628 MP6 @ 600 MHz
Samsung	Exynos 5 Hexa 7872	Mali-G71 MP1 @ 1200 MHz
Samsung	Exynos 7 Octa 5433/7410	Mali-T760 MP6 @ 700 MHz
Samsung	Exynos 7 Octa 7420	Mali-T760 MP8 @ 772 MHz
Samsung	Exynos 7 Quad 7570	Mali-T720 MP1 @ 830 MHz
Samsung	Exynos 7 Octa 7578/7580	Mali-T720 MP2 @ 668 MHz
Samsung	Exynos 7 Octa 7870	Mali-T830 MP1 @ 700 MHz
Samsung	Exynos 7 Octa 7880	Mali-T830 MP3 @ 950 MHz
Samsung	Exynos 7 Series 7884A	Mali-G71 MP2 @ 450 MHz
Samsung	Exynos 7 Series 7884	Mali-G71 MP2 @ 676/845 MHz
Samsung	Exynos 7 Series 7885	Mali-G71 MP2 @ 1100 MHz
Samsung	Exynos 7 Series 7904	Mali-G71 MP2 @ 770 MHz
Samsung	Exynos 850	Mali-G52 MP1 @ 1001 MHz
Samsung	Exynos 880	Mali-G76 MP5 @ 546 MHz
Samsung	Exynos 8 Octa 8890	Mali-T880 MP10 (Lite) @650 MHz; Mali-T880 MP12 @650 MHz
Samsung	Exynos 9 Octa 8895	Mali-G71 MP20 @ 546 MHz
Samsung	Exynos 7 Series 9609	Mali-G72 MP3
Samsung	Exynos 7 Series 9610	Mali-G72 MP3 @ 1053 MHz
Samsung	Exynos 7 Series 9611	Mali-G72 MP3 @ 850 MHz
Samsung	Exynos 9 Series 9810	Mali-G72 MP18 @ 572 MHz
Samsung	Exynos 9 Series 9820	Mali-G76 MP12 @ 702 MHz
Samsung	Exynos 9 Series 9825	Mali-G76 MP12 @ 754 MHz
Samsung	Exynos 9 Series 980	Mali-G76 MP5 @ 728 MHz
Samsung	Exynos 9 Series 990	Mali-G77 MP11 @ 832 MHz
Samsung	Exynos 1080	Mali-G78 MP10 @ 800 MHz
Samsung	Exynos 1280	Mali-G68 MP4 @ 897 MHz
Samsung	Exynos 1330	Mali G68 MP2 @ 949 MHz
Samsung	Exynos 1380	Mali-G68 MP5 @ 949 MHz
Samsung	Exynos 2100	Mali-G78 MP14 @ 854 MHz
Samsung	S5P6450 Vega	Mali-400 MP
Sigma Designs	SMP8750 Series	Mali-400 MP4 @ 350 MHz
Socle-Tech	Leopard-6	Mali-200
Spreadtrum	SC68xx, SC57xx, SC77xx, SC8xxx, SC983x	Mali-400 MP Series
Spreadtrum	SC9860, SC9860GV	Mali-T880 MP4
ST-Ericsson	NovaThor U9500, U8500, U5500	Mali-400 MP
STMicroelectronics	SPEAr1340	Mali-200
STMicroelectronics	STi7108, STiH416	Mali-400 MP
Telechips	TCC8803, TCC8902, TCC8900, TCC9201	Mali-200
WonderMedia	WM8750	Mali-200
WonderMedia	WM8850, WM8950	Mali-400 MP
WonderMedia	WM8880, WM8980	Mali-400 MP2
WonderMedia	WM8860	Mali-450
Xiaomi	Surge S1	Mali-T860 MP4 @ 800 MHz
Xiaomi	Surge S2	Mali-G71 MP12 @ 900 MHz (?)
Xiaomi	Xring O1	Immortalis-G925 MP16

== Video processors ==
Mali Video is the name given to ARM Holdings' dedicated video decoding and video encoding ASIC. There are multiple versions implementing a number of video codecs, such as HEVC, VP9, H.264 and VP8. As with all ARM products, the Mali video processor is a semiconductor intellectual property core licensed to third parties for inclusion in their chips. Real time encode-decode capability is central to videotelephony. An interface to ARM's TrustZone technology is also built-in to enable digital rights management of copyrighted material.

=== Mali-V500 ===
The first version of a Mali Video processor was the V500, released in 2013 with the Mali-T622 GPU. The V500 is a multicore design, sporting 1–8 cores, with support for H.264 and a protected video path using ARM TrustZone. The 8 core version is sufficient for 4K video decode at 120 frames per second (fps). The V500 can encode VP8 and H.264, and decode H.264, H.263, MPEG4, MPEG2, VC-1/WMV, Real, VP8.

=== Mali-V550 ===
Released with the Mali-T800 GPU, ARM V550 video processors added both encode and decode HEVC support, 10-bit color depth, and technologies to further reduced power consumption. The V550 also included technology improvements to better handle latency and save bandwidth. Again built around the idea of a scalable number of cores (1–8) the V550 could support between 1080p60 (1 core) to 4K120 (8 cores). The V550 supported HEVC Main, H.264, VP8, JPEG encode, and HEVC Main 10, HEVC Main, H.264, H.263, MPEG4, MPEG2, VC-1/WMV, Real, VP8, JPEG decode.

=== Mali-V61 ===
The Mali V61 video processor (formerly named Egil) was released with the Mali Bifrost GPU in 2016. V61 has been designed to improve video encoding, in particular HEVC and VP9, and to allow for encoding either a single or multiple streams simultaneously. The design continues the 1–8 variable core number design, with a single core supporting 1080p60 while 8 cores can drive 4Kp120. It can decode and encode VP9 10-bit, VP9 8-bit, HEVC Main 10, HEVC Main, H.264, VP8, JPEG and decode only MPEG4, MPEG2, VC-1/WMV, Real, H.263.

=== Mali-V52 ===
The Mali V52 video processor was released with the Mali G52 and G31 GPUs in March 2018. The processor is intended to support 4K (including HDR) video on mainstream devices.

The platform is scalable from 1 to 4 cores and doubles the decode performance relative to V61. It also adds High 10 H.264 encode (Level 5.0) and decode (Level 5.1) capabilities, as well as AVS Part 2 (Jizhun) and Part 16 (AVS+, Guangdian) decode capability for YUV420.

=== Mali-V76 ===
The Mali V76 video processor was released with the Mali G76 GPU and Cortex-A76 CPU in 2018. The V76 was designed to improve video encoding and decoding performance. The design continues the 2–8 variable core number design, with 8 cores capable of 8Kp60 decoding and 8Kp30 encoding. It claims improves HEVC encode quality by 25% relative to Mali-V61 at launch. The AV1 codec is not supported.

=== Mali-V77 ===
The Mali V77 video processor was released with the Mali G77 GPU and Cortex-A77 CPU in 2019.

=== Comparison ===
Mali Video	V500	V550	V61	V52	V76	V77
Announced	June 2, 2013	October 27, 2014	October 31, 2016	March 6, 2018	May 31, 2018	
Recommended GPU		Mali-T800-series	Mali-G51; Mali-G72	Mali-G31; Mali-G52	Mali-G76	Mali-G77
Recommended DPU	Mali-DP500	Mali-DP550; Mali-DP650	Mali-DP650; Mali-D71	Mali-D52		
Memory system	MMU					
Bus interface	AMBA 3 AXI; AMBA 4 ACE Lite		AMBA AXI	AMBA4 AXI		
Performance (enc)	1080p60 (1 core) to 4K120 (8 core)			1080p60 (1 core) to 4K60 (4 core)	1080p60 (1 core) to 8K30 (8 core)	
Performance (dec)	1080p60 (1 core) to 4K120 (8 core)			1080p120 / 4K30 (1 core) to 4K120 (4 core)	1080p120 / 4K30 (1 core) to 8K60 (8 core)	
Decode & encode						
H.264 8-bit	D & E	D & E	D & E	D & E	D & E	D & E
H.264 10-bit	-	-	-	D & E	D & E	D & E
VP8	D & E	D & E	D & E	D & E	D & E	D & E
JPEG	-	D & E	D & E	D & E	D & E	D & E
HEVC Main	-	D & E	D & E	D & E	D & E	D & E
HEVC Main 10	-	D	D & E	D & E	D & E	D & E
VP9 8-bit	-	-	D & E	D & E	D & E	D & E
VP9 10-bit	-	-	D & E	D & E	D & E	D & E
AV1	-	-	-	-	-	-

== Display processors ==
=== Mali-D71 ===
The Mali-D71 added Arm Framebuffer Compression (AFBC) 1.2 encoder, support for ARM CoreLink MMU-600 and Assertive Display 5. Assertive Display 5 has support for HDR10 and hybrid log–gamma (HLG).

=== Mali-D77 ===
The Mali-D77 added features including asynchronous timewarp (ATW), lens distortion correction (LDC), and chromatic aberration correction (CAC). The Mali-D77 is also capable of 3K (2880x1440) @ 120 Hz and 4K @ 90 Hz.

Mali Display	DP500	DP550	DP650	D71	D51	D77	D37
Announced	May 8, 2010	October 27, 2014	January 20, 2016	October 31, 2017	March 6, 2018	May 15, 2019	October 23, 2019
Optimized res	n/a	720p (HD) to 1080p (FHD)	1440p (QHD)	1440p (QHD) to 2160p (UHD/4K)	1080p (FHD) to 1440p (QHD)	2880x1440 @ 120 Hz	1080p (FHD) to 1440p (QHD)
Maximum res	2160p (4K)	2160p (4K)	2160p (4K)	2160p (4K) up to 120fps	4096x2048 up to 60fps	4320x2160 @ 120 Hz	
Launched alongside	Cortex-A17 core	Mali-T800 series GPU, V550 Video Processor		CoreLink MMU-600, Assertive Display 5	Mali-G31, Mali-G52, Mali-V52		Ethos-N77, Ethos-N57, Ethos-N37 Mali-G57

== Image signal processors ==
=== Mali-C71 ===
On 25 April 2017 the Mali-C71 was announced, ARM's first image signal processor (ISP).

=== Mali-C52 and Mali-C32 ===
On 3 January 2019 the Mali-C52 and C32 were announced, aimed at everyday devices including drones, smart home assistants and security, and internet protocol (IP) camera.

=== Mali-C71AE ===
On 29 September 2020 the Mali-C71AE image signal processor was introduced, alongside the Cortex-A78AE CPU and Mali-G78AE GPU. It supports up to 4 real-time cameras or up to 16 virtual cameras with a maximum resolution of 4096 x 4096 each.

=== Mali-C55 ===
On 8 June 2022 the Mali-C55 ISP was introduced as successor to the C52. It is the smallest and most configurable image signal processor from Arm, and support up to 8 camera with a max resolution of 48 megapixel each. Arm claims improved tone mapping and spatial noise reduction compared to the C52. Multiple C55 ISPs can be combined to support higher than 48 megapixel resolutions.

=== Comparison ===
Mali camera	C32	C52	C55	C71	C71AE
Announced	January 3, 2019		June 8, 2022	April 25, 2017	September 29, 2020
Throughput	600 MP/s		1.2 GP/s		
Support cameras	4		8	4 real-time or 16 virtual	
Max resolution	4608×3456 (16 MP)		8192×6144 (48 MP)	4096×4096 (16MP)	
Bit-depth (dynamic range)			20-bit (20 stops)	24-bit (24 stops)	
Channel support	RGGB, RGBlr		RGGB	RGGB, RCCC, RGBIr, RCCB, RCCG	RGGB, RCCC, RCCB, RCCG, RGBIr
Channel support				up to 16 channels	
ASIL compliance					ASIL B / SIL 2 ASIL D / SIL 3

== The Lima, Panfrost and Panthor FOSS drivers ==
On 21 January 2012, Phoronix reported that Luc Verhaegen was driving a reverse-engineering attempt aimed at the Mali series of GPUs, specifically the Mali 200 and Mali 400 versions. The project was known as Lima and targeted support for OpenGL ES 2.0. The reverse-engineering project was presented at FOSDEM, February 4, 2012, followed by the opening of a website demonstrating some renders. On February 2, 2013, Verhaegen demonstrated Quake III Arena in timedemo mode, running on top of the Lima driver. In May 2018, a Lima developer posted the kernel driver for inclusion in the Linux kernel. In May 2019, the Lima kernel driver became part of the mainline Linux kernel, and the Mesa userspace counterpart was merged at the same time. It currently supports OpenGL ES 1.1, 2.0 and parts of Desktop OpenGL 2.1, and the fallback emulation in Mesa provides full support for graphical desktop environments.

Panfrost is an open-source driver stack for Mali (and Immortalis) GPUs, covering Txxx (Midgard) and newer generations. A talk introducing Panfrost was presented at X.Org Developer's Conference 2018. As of May 2019, the Panfrost kernel driver is part of the mainline Linux kernel. The userspace side consists of Mesa's Panfrost driver that provides OpenGL ES and OpenGL; as well as the PanVK userspace driver that provides Vulkan.

Collabora developed the Panthor kernel driver for third-generation and newer Valhall GPUs. The Panfrost and PanVK userspace drivers in Mesa use the Panthor kernel driver on these GPUs. Later, Collabora announced the Tyr kernel driver, a joint effort between Collabora, Arm, and Google, written in Rust and designed to eventually replace the Panthor kernel driver.

== See also ==
- Adreno – GPU developed by Qualcomm (formerly AMD, then Freescale)
- Atom family of SoCs – with Intel graphics core, not licensed to third parties
- AMD mobile APUs – with AMD graphics core, not licensed to third parties
- PowerVR – by Imagination Technologies
- Tegra – family of SoCs by Nvidia with the graphics core available as a SIP block to third parties
- VideoCore – family of SoCs by Broadcom with the graphics core available as a SIP block to third parties
- Vivante – available as SIP block to third parties
- Imageon – old AMD mobile GPU
- RDNA – by AMD, licensed to Samsung for use as GPUs in Exynos SoCs under Xclipse name
