= InfoTM =

Chinese technology company

InfoTM Microelectronics Co., Ltd
- Native name: 盈方微电子股份有限公司
- Industry: Fabless semiconductor; Consumer electronics
- Founded: 2008
- Headquarters: Zhangjiang High-Tech Park, Shanghai, China
- Key people: Ricky Chen (CSO)
- Website: www.infotmic.com.cn

InfoTM is a Chinese technology company that was founded in 2008 as InfoTM Microelectronics Co., Ltd.

== Application processors ==
Model Number	Fab	CPU				GPU		Memory Technology		Ethernet Speed	Sampl. Avail- ability	Utilizing Devices
Model Number	Fab	ISA	μarch	Cores	Freq. (GHz)	μarch	Freq. (MHz)	Type	Bus width	Ethernet Speed	Sampl. Avail- ability	Utilizing Devices
iMAPx200/210/220	65 nm	ARMv6	ARM11	1	1	Vivante GC600		DDR1/DDR2/LPDDR1 400 MHz	32bit	10/100 MAC	2010	List: IP872
iMAPx15	40 nm	ARMv7-A	Cortex-A5	2	1	Mali-400 MP	400	DDR2/DDR3/LPDDR2 533 MHz	32bit	10/100 MAC	2012	
iMAPx820	40 nm	ARMv7-A	Cortex-A5	2	1	Mali-400 MP2		DDR2/DDR3/LPDDR2 533 MHz	32bit	10/100 MAC	2012	List: IPPO-Y88, HotItem Y27B
iMAPx912	40 nm	ARMv7-A	Cortex-A9	4	1.5	Mali-400 MP2		DDR2/DDR3/LPDDR2 533 MHz	32bit	10/100 MAC	2013	
