= ARM Cortex-A7 =

2011 computer microprocessor core

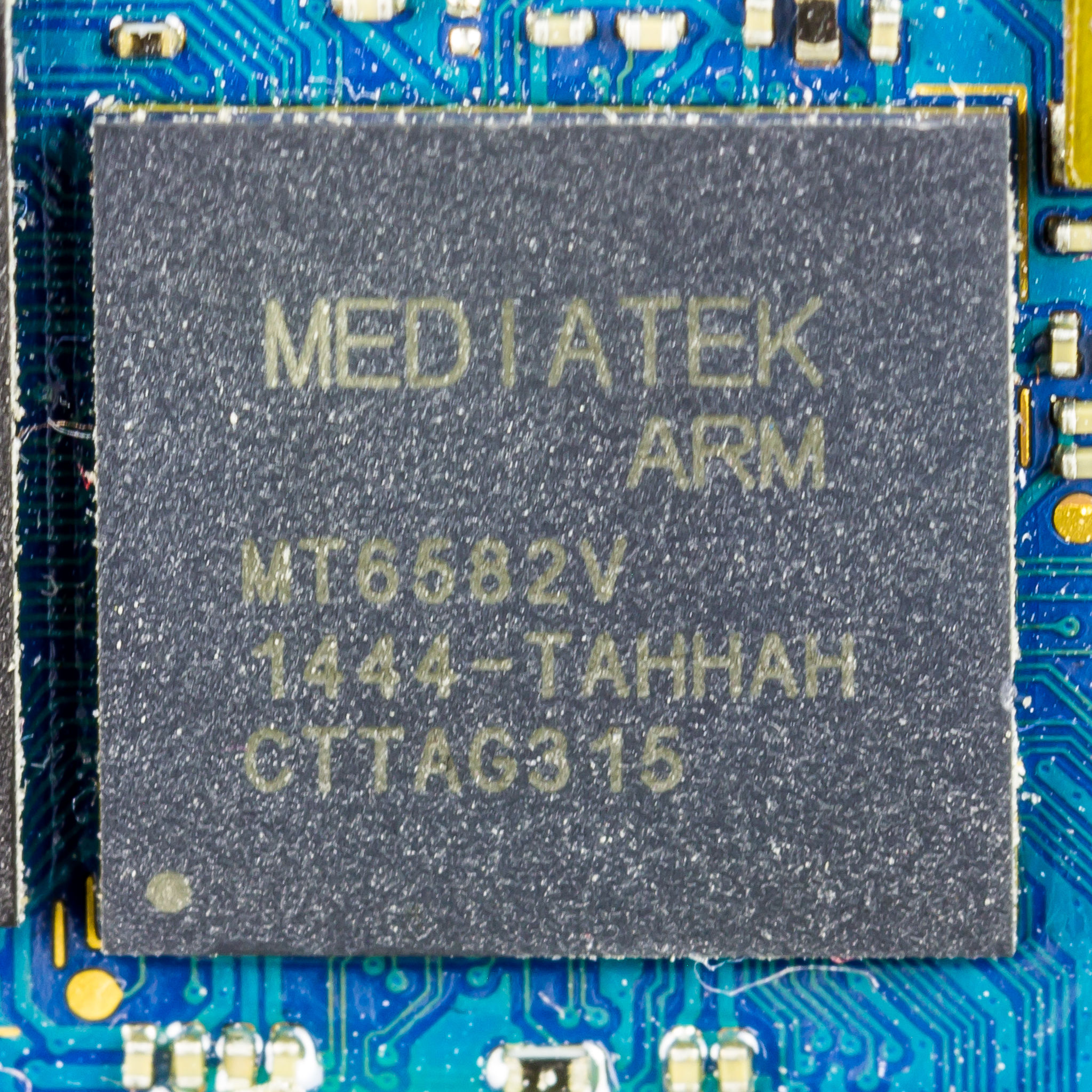
- Mediatek MT6582V

General information
- Launched: 2011
- Designed by: ARM Holdings

Performance
- Max. CPU clock rate: 520 MHz to 2.3 GHz

Physical specifications
- Cores: 1–8

Cache
- L1 cache: 8–64 KB/8–64 KB
- L2 cache: Optional, up to 1 MB

Architecture and classification
- Instruction set: ARMv7-A

History
- Predecessor: ARM Cortex-A5
- Successor: ARM Cortex-A53

The ARM Cortex-A7 MPCore is a 32-bit microprocessor core licensed by ARM Holdings implementing the ARMv7-A architecture announced in 2011.

== Overview ==
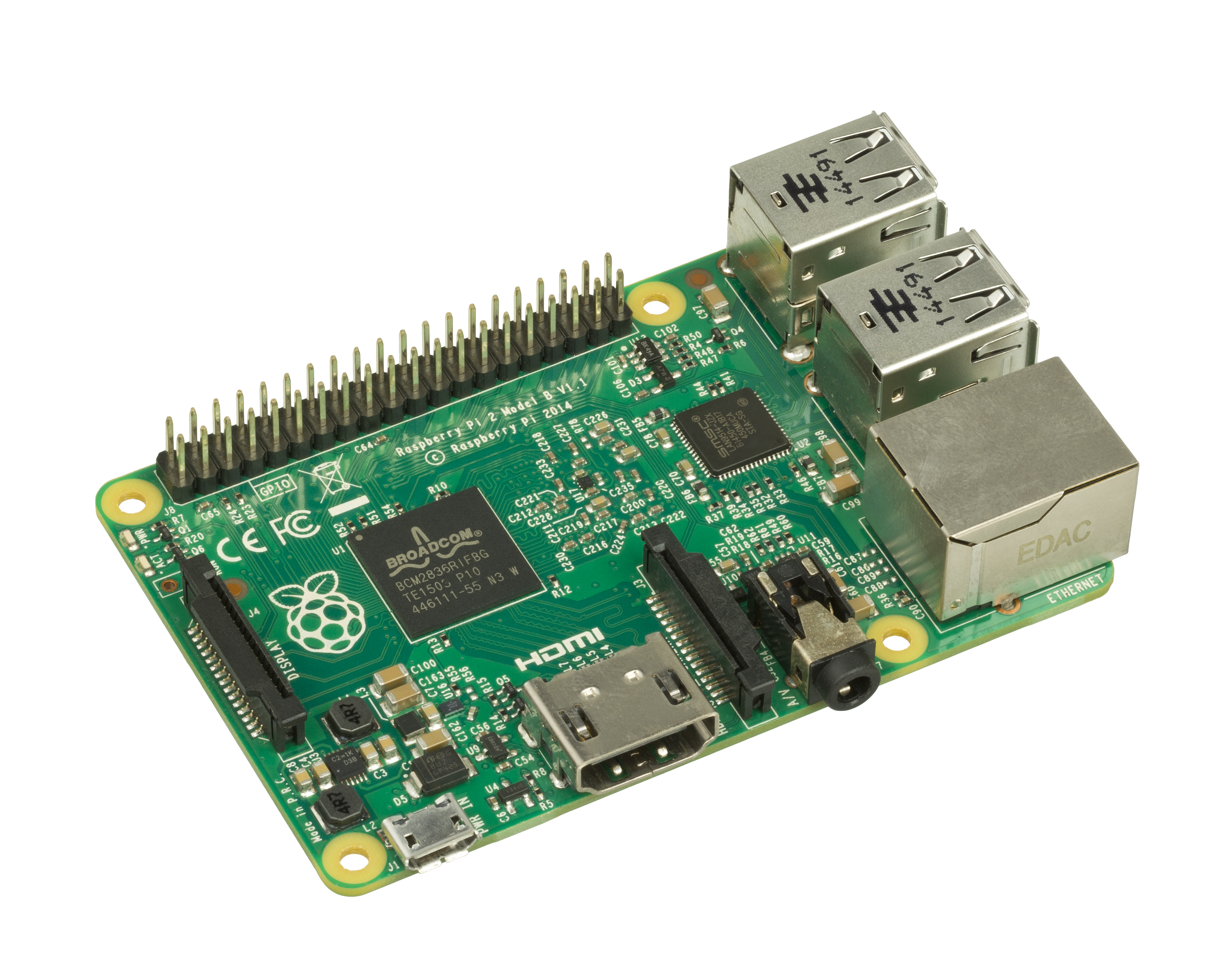
The Cortex-A7 is used to power the popular Raspberry Pi 2 micro-computer.

It has two target applications; firstly as a smaller, simpler, and more power-efficient successor to the Cortex-A8. The other use is in the big.LITTLE architecture, combining one or more A7 cores with one or more Cortex-A15 cores into a heterogeneous system. To do this it is fully feature-compatible with the A15.

Key features of the Cortex-A7 core are:

- Partial dual-issue, in-order microarchitecture with an 8-stage pipeline
- NEON SIMD instruction set extension
- VFPv4 Floating Point Unit
- Thumb-2 instruction set encoding
- Jazelle RCT
- Hardware virtualization
- Large Page Address Extensions (LPAE)
- Integrated level 2 Cache (0–1 MB)
- 1.9 DMIPS / MHz
- Typical clock speed 1.5 GHz

== Chips ==
Several system-on-chips (SoC) have implemented the Cortex-A7 core, including:

- Allwinner A20 (dual-core A7 + Mali-400 MP2 GPU)
- Allwinner A31 (quad-core A7 + PowerVR SGX544MP2 GPU)
- Allwinner A83T (octa-core A7 + PowerVR SGX544 GPU)
- Allwinner H3(quad-core A7 + Mali-400 MP2 GPU)
- Broadcom BCM23550 quad-core HSPA+ Multimedia Processor
- Broadcom BCM2836 (quad-core A7 + VideoCore IV GPU), designed specifically for Raspberry Pi 2
- Broadcom BCM6846 (dual-core A7) Broadband SoC
- NXP Semiconductor (Formerly Freescale) QorIQ Layerscape LS1 (dual-core A7)
- Freescale i.MX 6 UltraLite
- HiSilicon K3V3, big.LITTLE architecture with dual-core Cortex-A7 and dual-core Cortex-A15. Use ARM Mali-T658 GPU.
- Marvell PXA1088 (quad-core A7 + Vivante GC1000)
- Mediatek MT6570 (dual-core A7 + ARM Mali-400MP1 GPU)
- Mediatek MT6572 (dual-core A7 + ARM Mali-400MP1 GPU)
- Mediatek MT6580 (quad-core A7 + ARM Mali-400MP2 GPU)
- Mediatek MT6582 (quad-core A7 + ARM Mali-400MP2 GPU)
- Mediatek MT6589 (quad-core A7 + Imagination Technologies PowerVR SGX544 GPU)
- Mediatek MT6592 (octa-core A7 + ARM Mali-450MP4 GPU)
- Mstar MSB2531A ARM Cortex A7 32bit 800MHZ
- Qualcomm Snapdragon 200 and Snapdragon 400 MSM8212 and MSM8612, MSM8226, MSM8626 and MSM8926 (quad core A7 + Adreno 305 GPU)
- Samsung Exynos 5 Octa (5410), big.LITTLE architecture with quad-core Cortex-A7 and quad-core Cortex-A15. Use Imagination Technologies PowerVR SGX544MP3 GPU.
- Samsung Exynos 5 Octa (5420), big.LITTLE architecture with quad-core Cortex-A7 and quad-core Cortex-A15. Use ARM Mali-T628MP6 GPU.
- STMicroelectronics STM32MP13x (single-core A7)
- STMicroelectronics STM32MP15x (dual-core A7 + M4 + Vivante GPU)
- ASPEED AST2600 BMC (dual-core A7 + M4)

== See also ==
- ARM architecture
- Comparison of ARMv7-A cores
- JTAG
- List of applications of ARM cores
- List of ARM cores
