= ARM Cortex-A8 =

Processor core in computers

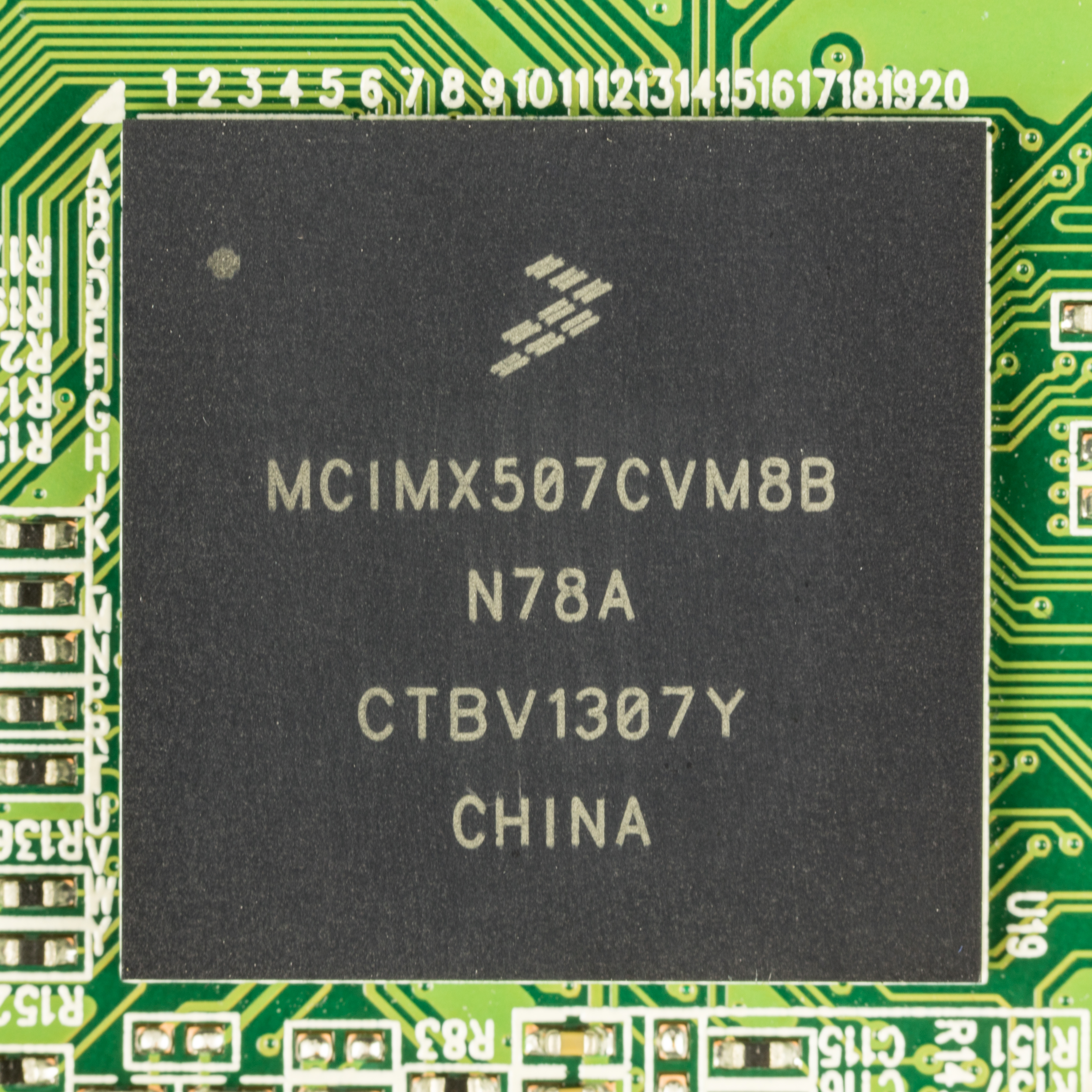
- Cortex-A8 is commonly incorporated into SoCs, such as this Freescale i.MX50; the chip is seen on an e-reader's main logic board.

General information
- Launched: 2005
- Designed by: ARM Holdings
- Common manufacturer: TSMC

Performance
- Max. CPU clock rate: 0.6 GHz to at least 1.0 GHz

Physical specifications
- Cores: 1

Cache
- L1 cache: 32 KiB/32 KiB
- L2 cache: 512 KiB

Architecture and classification
- Instruction set: ARMv7-A

The ARM Cortex-A8 is a 32-bit processor core licensed by ARM Holdings implementing the ARMv7-A architecture.

Compared to the ARM11, the Cortex-A8 is a dual-issue superscalar design, and is capable of at most twice the instructions per cycle. The Cortex-A8 was the first Cortex design to be adopted on a large scale in consumer devices.

== Features ==
Key features of the Cortex-A8 core are:

- Frequency from 600 MHz to 1 GHz and above
- Superscalar dual-issue microarchitecture
- NEON SIMD instruction set extension
- 13-stage integer pipeline and 10-stage NEON pipeline
- VFPv3 floating-point unit
- Thumb-2 instruction set encoding
- Jazelle RCT (also known as ThumbEE instruction set)
- Advanced branch prediction unit with >95% accuracy
- Integrated level 2 Cache (0–4 MiB)
- 2.0 DMIPS/MHz

== Chips ==
Several system-on-chips (SoC) have implemented the Cortex-A8 core, including:

- Allwinner A1X
- Apple A4
- Freescale Semiconductor i.MX51
- Rockchip RK2918, RK2906
- Samsung Exynos 3110
- TI OMAP3
- TI Sitara ARM Processors
- Conexant CX92755

== See also ==
- ARM architecture
- Comparison of ARMv7-A cores
- JTAG
- List of applications of ARM cores
- List of ARM cores
