= List of Rockchip products =

This is a list of Rockchip products.

== Products ==
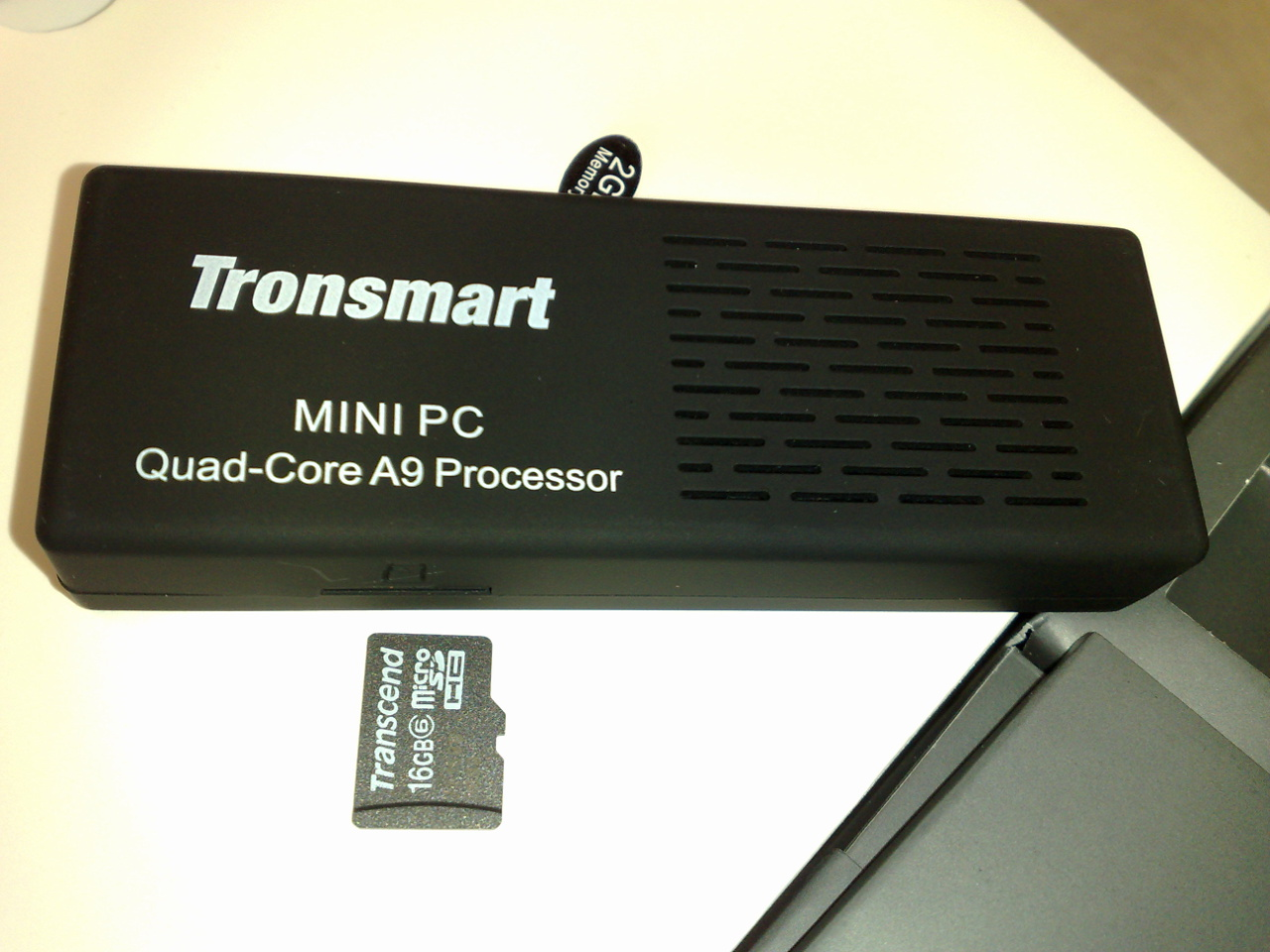
Tronsmart MK908, a Rockchip-based quad-core Android "mini PC", with a microSD card next to it for a size comparison.

=== Featured products ===
==== RK3399 ====
RK3399 was the flagship SoC of Rockchip, Dual A72 and Quad A53 and Mali-T860MP4 GPU, providing high computing and multi-media performance, rich interfaces and peripherals. And software supports multiple APIs: OpenGL ES 3.2, Vulkan 1.0, OpenCL 1.1/1.2, OpenVX1.0, AI interfaces support TensorFlow Lite/AndroidNN API.

RK3399 Linux source code and hardware documents are on GitHub and Wiki opensource website.

RK3399	CPU	GPU	Memory	Video Decoder	Video Encoder	Display Interface	ISP	Camera Sensor Interface	USB	Digital Audio Interface
RK3399	Dual Cortex-A72 + Quad Cortex-A53, 64-bit CPU	Mali-T860 GPU	Dual-channel DDR3-1866/DDR3L-1866/LPDDR3-1866/LPDDR4, eMMC 5.1	Up to 4Kp60 H.265/H.264/VP9	Up to 1080p30 H.264	HDMI2.0, 2 x MIPI DSI, eDP	13 M	Dual channel MIPI CSI-2 receive interface	Dual USB 3.0 with type-C supported	1 x I2S/PCM (2ch) 2 x I2S (8ch), S/PDIF

==== RK3288 ====
RK3288 is a high performance IoT platform, Quad-core Cortex-A17 CPU and Mali-T760MP4 GPU, 4K video decoding and 4K display out. It is applied to products of various industries including Vending Machine, Commercial Display, Medical Equipment, Gaming, Intelligent POS, Interactive Printer, Robot, Industrial Computer, but also consumer products like DJ (Denon) and producing (Akai) equipment.

RK3288 Linux source code and hardware documents are on GitHub and Wiki opensource website.

RK3288	CPU	GPU	External Memory Interface	Video Decoder	Video Encoder	Display Interface	ISP	Camera Sensor Interface	USB	Digital Audio Interface
RK3288	Quad-Core Cortex-A17	Mali-T760MP4 GPU	Dual-channel DDR3/DDR3L/LPDDR2/LPDDR3, SLC/MLC/TLC Nand Flash, eMMC4.5	Up to 4Kp60 H.265/H.264/VP9	Up to 1080p30 H.264	HDMI 2.0, 2 x MIPI DSI, LVDS, eDP, Parallel RGB	13M	Parallel CIF, MIPI CSI-2	1 x USB 2.0 OTG, 2 x USB 2.0 Host	1 x I2S (8ch), S/PDIF

==== RK3326 & PX30 ====
RK3326 and PX30 are newly announced in 2018, designed for Smart AI solutions. PX30 is a variant of RK3326 targeting IoT market, supporting dual VOP. They are with Arm's new generation of CPU Cortex-A35 and GPU G31. The RK3326 is widely used in handheld consoles designed for emulation.

Feature	CPU	GPU	External Memory Interface	Video Decoder	Video Encoder	Display Interface	ISP	Camera Sensor Interface	USB	Digital Audio Interface
PX30	Quad-Core Cortex-A35	Mali-G31 GPU	32-bit DDR4-1600/DDR3/L-1600/ LPDDR3-1600/LPDDR2-1066, MLC NAND, Nor FLASH, eMMC 4.5	1080p60 H.264/H.265	1080p30 H.264	MIPI DSI, Parallel RGB, LVDS, *Support dual VOP	8 M	MIPI CSI and DVP Sensor interface	USB 2.0 Host & OTG	2 x I2S/PCM (2ch) 1 x I2S/TDM (8ch) 1 x PDM (8ch)
RK3326	Quad-core Cortex-A35	Mali-G31 MP2 GPU	32-bit DDR4-1600/DDR3/L-1600/ LPDDR3-1600/LPDDR2-1066, MLC NAND, Nor FLASH, eMMC 4.5	1080p60 H.264/H.265/VP8	1080p30 H.264/VP8	MIPI DSI, Parallel RGB, LVDS	8 M	MIPI CSI and DVP Sensor interface	USB 2.0 OTG	2 x I2S/PCM (2ch) 1 x I2S/TDM (8ch) 1 x PDM (8ch)

==== RK3308 ====
RK3308 is another newly released chipset targeting Smart AI solutions. It is an entry-level chipset aimed at mainstream devices. The chip has multiple audio input interfaces, and greater energy efficiency, featuring an embedded VAD (Voice Activation Detection).

RK3308	CPU	Audio	Memory		Connectivity		
RK3308	Quad-core Cortex-A35	Embedded Audio CODEC with 8xADC,2xDAC	16-bit DDR3-1066/DDR3L-1066/DDR2-1066/LPDDR2-1066	Support SLC NAND, eMMC 4.51, Serial Nor FLASH	Support 2x8ch I2S/TDM, 1x8ch PDM, 1x2ch I2S/PCM	Support SPDIF IN/OUT, HDMI ARC	SDIO 3.0, USB 2.0 OTG, USB 2.0 Host, I2C, UART, SPI, I2S

==== RV1108 ====
The announcement of RV1108 indicated Rockchip's moves to AI/computer vision territory.

With CEVA DSP embedded, RV1108 powers smart cameras including 360° Video Camera, IPC, Drone, Car Camcoder, Sport DV, VR, etc. It also has been deployed for new retail and intelligent marketing applications with integrated algorithms.

RV1108	CPU	DSP	External Memory Interface	Video Decoder	Video Encoder	Display Interface	ISP	Camera Sensor Interface	USB	Digital Audio Interface
RV1108	Cortex-A7 up to 1.0 GHz	CEVA XM4 DSP	16-bit DDR3/DDR3L, SPI NOR FLASH, SLC NAND，eMMC	1440p30 H.264	1440p30 H.264	HDMI 1.4，MIPI DSI， Parallel RGB, CVBS OUT	8 M with WDR	MIPI CSI-2, CVBS IN	1 x USB 2.0 OTG 1 x USB 2.0 Host	2 x I2S/PCM (2ch) 1 x I2S(8ch)

==== RK1808 ====
The RK1808 is Rockchip's first chip with Neural Processing Unit (NPU) for artificial intelligence applications. The RK1808 specifications include:

- Dual-core ARM Cortex-A35 CPU
- Neural Processing Unit (NPU) with up to 3.0 TOPs supporting INT8/INT16/FP16 hybrid operation
- 22 nm FD-SOI process
- VPU supporting 1080p video codec
- Built-in 2 MB system-level SRAM

==== RK3530 ====
The RK3530 is a SoC that will ship in Q3 2019 targeting the set-top box market. The RK3530 specifications include:

- 4 × Cortex-A55 DynamIQ CPU
- Mali G52 GPU
- 14 LPP process

==== RV1109 ====
The RV1109 is a vision processor SoC that will ship in Q4 2019. The RV1109 specifications include:

- 14 LPP process
- NPU 2.0
- ISP 2.0
- VPU 2.0 capable of 4K H.264/H.265

==== RK3588 ====
The RK3588 is a high-end SoC. Products based on the RK3588 were launched in 2022. The RK3588 specifications include:

- 4 × Cortex-A76 and 4 × Cortex-A55 DynamIQ CPU
- NPU 2.0
- 8 LPP process
- VPU 2.0 supporting 8K video
- Built-in 2 MB system-level SRAM

=== Early products ===
RK26xx series - Released 2006.

RK27xx series - Rockchip was first known for their RK 27xx series that was very efficient at MP3/MP4 decoding and was integrated in many low-cost personal media player (PMP) products.

RK28xx series

The RK2806 was targeted at PMPs.

The RK2808A is an ARM926EJ-S derivative. Along with the ARM core a DSP coprocessor is included. The native clock speed is 560 MHz. ARM rates the performance of the ARM926EJ-S at 1.1 DMIPS/MHz the performance of the Rockchip 2808 when executing ARM instructions is therefore 660 DMIPS roughly 26% the speed of Apple's A4 processor. The DSP coprocessor can support the real-time decoding of 720p video files at bitrates of up to 2.5 Mbit/s. This chip was the core of many Android and Windows Mobile-based mobile internet devices.

The RK2816 was targeted at PMP devices, and MIDs. It has the same specifications as the RK2806 but also includes HDMI output, Android support, and up to 720p hardware video acceleration.

RK29xx series

The Rockchip RK291x is a family of SoCs based on the ARM Cortex-A8 CPU core. They were presented for the first time at CES 2011. The RK292x are single core SoCs based on ARM Cortex-A9 and were first introduced in 2012.

The RK2918 was the first chip to decode Google WebM VP8 in hardware. It uses a dynamically configurable companion core to process various codecs. It encodes and decodes H.264 at 1080p, and can decode many standard video formats including Xvid, H.263, AVS, MPEG4, RV, and WMV. It includes a Vivante GC800 GPU that is compatible with OpenGL ES 2.0 and OpenVG. The RK2918 is compatible with Android Froyo (2.2), Gingerbread (2.3), HoneyComb (3.x) and Ice Cream Sandwich (4.0). Unofficial support for Ubuntu and other Linux flavours exists. As of 2013, it was targeted at e-readers.

The RK2906 is basically a cost-reduced version of the RK2918, also targeted at e-readers as of 2013.

The Rockchip RK2926 and RK2928 feature a single core ARM Cortex A9 running at a speed up to 1.0 GHz. It replaces the Vivante GC800 GPU of the older RK291x series with an ARM Mali-400 GPU. As of 2013, the RK2926 was targeted at tablets, while the RK2928 was targeted at tablets and Android TV dongles and boxes.

RK30xx series

The RK3066 is a high performance dual-core ARM Cortex-A9 mobile processor similar to the Samsung Exynos 4 Dual Core chip. In terms of performance, the RK3066 is between the Samsung Exynos 4210 and the Samsung Exynos 4212. As of 2013, it was targeted at tablets and Android TV dongles and boxes. It has been a popular choice for both tablets and other devices since 2012.

The RK3068 is a version of the RK3066 specifically targeted at Android TV dongles and boxes. Its package is much smaller than the RK3066.

The RK3028 is a low-cost dual-core ARM Cortex-A9-based processor clocked at 1.0 GHz with ARM Mali-400 GPU. It is pin-compatible with the RK2928. It is used in a few kids tablets and low-cost Android HDMI TV dongles.

The RK3026 is an updated ultra-low-end dual-core ARM Cortex-A9-based tablet processor clocked at 1.0 GHz with ARM Mali-400 MP2 GPU. Manufactured at 40 nm, it is pin-compatible with the RK2926. It features 1080p H.264 video encoding and 1080p decoding in multiple formats. Supporting Android 4.4, it has been adopted for low-end tablets in 2014.

The RK3036 is a low-cost dual-core ARM Cortex-A7-based processor released in Q4 2014 for smart set-top boxes with support for H.265 video decoding.

=== RK31xx series ===
The RK3188 was the first product in the RK31xx series, announced for production in the 2nd quarter of 2013. The RK3188 features a quad-core ARM Cortex-A9 clocked up to 1.6 GHz frequency. It is targeted at tablets and Android TV dongles and boxes, and has been a popular choice for both tablets and other devices requiring good performance.

- 28 nm HKMG process at GlobalFoundries
- Quad-core ARM Cortex-A9, up to 1.6 GHz
- 512 KB L2 cache
- Mali-400 MP4 GPU, up to 600 MHz (typically 533 MHz) supporting OpenGL ES 1.1/2.0, Open G 1.1
- High performance dedicated 2D processor
- DDR3, DDR3L, LPDDR2 support
- Dual-panel display up to 2048×1536 resolution

The RK3188T is a lower-clocked version of the RK3188, with the CPU cores running at a maximum speed of 1.4 GHz instead of 1.6 GHz. The Mali-400MP4 GPU is also clocked at a lower speed. As of early 2014, many devices advertised as using a RK3188 with a maximum clock speed of 1.6 GHz actually have a RK3188T with clock speed limited to 1.4 GHz. Operating system ROMs specifically made for the RK3188 may not work correctly with a RK3188T.

The RK3168, first shown in April 2013, is a dual-core Cortex A9-based CPU, also manufactured using the 28 nm process. It is targeted at low-end tablets. The chip has seen only limited use as of May 2014.

The RK3126 is an entry-level tablet processor introduced in Q4 2014. Manufactured using a 40 nm process, it features a quad-core Cortex-A7 CPU up to 1.3 GHz and a Mali-400 MP2 GPU. It is pin-compatible with RK3026 and RK2926.

- 40 nm process
- Quad-core ARM Cortex-A7, up to 1.3 GHz
- Mali-400 MP2 GPU
- High performance dedicated 2D processor
- DDR3, DDR3L memory interface
- 1080p multi-format video decoding and 1080p video encoding for H.264

The RK3128 is a higher-end variant of RK3126, also to be introduced in Q4 2014, that features more integrated external interfaces, including CVBS, HDMI, Ethernet MAC, S/PDIF, Audio DAC, and USB. It targets more fully featured tablets and set-top boxes.

=== RK32xx series ===
Rockchip has announced the RK3288 for production in the second quarter of 2014. Recent information suggests that the chip uses a quad-core ARM Cortex-A17 CPU, although technically ARM Cortex-A12, which as of October 1, 2014, ARM has decided to also refer to as Cortex-A17 because the latest production version of Cortex-A12 performs at a similar performance level as Cortex-A17.

- 28 nm HKMG process.
- Quad-core ARM Cortex-A17, up to 1.8 GHz
- Quad-core ARM Mali-T760 MP4 (also incorrectly called Mali-T764) GPU clocked at 600 MHz supporting OpenGL ES 1.1/2.0/3.0/3.1, OpenCL 1.1, Renderscript, Direct3D 11.1
- High performance dedicated 2D processor
- 1080P video encoding for H.264 and VP8, MVC
- 4K H.264 and 10 bits H.265 video decode, 1080p multi-video decode
- Supports 4Kx2K H.265 resolution
- Dual-channel DDR3, DDR3L, LPDDR2, LPDDR3
- Up to 3840×2160 display output, HDMI 2.0

==== Inconsistent information about CPU cores used in RK3288 ====
Early reports including Rockchip first suggested in summer 2013 that the RK3288 was originally designed using a quad-core ARM Cortex-A12 configuration. Rockchip's primary foundry partner GlobalFoundries announced a partnership with ARM to optimize the ARM Cortex-A12 for their 28 nm-SLP process. This is the same process used for earlier Rockchip chips such as the RK3188, and matches the choice of Cortex-A12 cores in the design of the RK3288.

In January 2014, official marketing materials listed the CPU cores as ARM Cortex-A17. At the CES electronics show in January 2014, someone apparently corrected the CPU specification as being ARM Cortex-A12 instead of Cortex-A17 on one of the panels of their show booth. However, since then, official specifications from Rockchip's website and marketing materials as well specifications used by device manufacturers have continued to describe the CPU as a quad-core ARM Cortex-A17.

Recent testing of early RK3288-based TV boxes (August/September 2014) provided evidence that the RK3288 technically contains Cortex-A12 cores, since the "ARM 0xc0d" CPU architecture reported by CPU-Z for Android is the reference for Cortex-A12, while the original Cortex-A17 is referred to as "ARM 0xc0e".

However, on the ARM community website, ARM clarified the situation on October 1, 2014, saying that Cortex-A12, for which Rockchip is one of the few known customers, will be called Cortex-A17 from now on, and that all references to Cortex-A12 have been removed from ARM's website. ARM explained that the latest production revision of Cortex-A12 now performs close to the level of Cortex-A17 because the improvements of the Cortex-A17 now also have been applied to the latest version of Cortex-A12. In this way, Rockchip now gets the official blessing from ARM for listing the cores inside the RK3288 as Cortex-A17.

The first Android TV stick based on RK3288 was launched in November 2014 ("ZERO Devices Z5C Thinko").

=== RK33xx series ===
==== RK3368 ====
Rockchip announced the first member of the RK33xx family at the CES show in January 2015. The RK3368 is a SoC targeting tablets and media boxes featuring a 64-bit octa-core Cortex-A53 CPU and an OpenGL ES 3.1-class GPU.

- Octa-Core Cortex-A53 64-bit CPU, up to 1.5 GHz
- PowerVR SGX6110 GPU with support for OpenGL 3.1 and OpenGL ES 3.0
- 28 nm process
- 4K UHD H.264/H.265 real-time video playback
- HDMI 2.0 for 4K@60 Hz with HDCP 1.4/2.2

==== RK3399 aka OP1 ====
The RK3399 announced by ARM at Mobile World Congress in February 2016, features six 64 bit CPU cores, including 2 Cortex-A72 and 4 Cortex-A53.

- Dual Cortex-A72 + Quad Cortex-A53 64-bit CPU, up to 1.8 GHz
- Mali-T860 MP4 (also incorrectly called Mali-T864) GPU with support for OpenGL ES 1.1/2.0/3.0/3.1, OpenVG 1.1, OpenCL, DX11
- 4K VP9 and 4K 10 bits H.265/H.264 video decoders, up to 60 fps
- 1080p video encoders for H.264 and VP8
- Dual 13 MP ISP and dual channel MIPI CSI-2 receive interface

Consumer devices include:

- Asus Chromebook Flip C101PA-DB02
- Asus Chromebook Tablet CT100
- Samsung Chromebook Plus
- PINEBOOK Pro
- PINEPHONE Pro

== Open source commitment ==
Rockchip provides open source software on GitHub and maintains a wiki Linux SDK website to offer free downloads of SoC hardware documents and software development resources as well as third-party development kit info. The chipsets available are RK3399, RK3288, RK3328 and RK3036.

== Markets and competition ==
In the market for SoCs for tablets, Rockchip faces competition with Allwinner Technology, MediaTek, Intel, Actions Semiconductor, Spreadtrum, Leadcore Technology, Samsung Semiconductor, Qualcomm, Broadcom, VIA Technologies, UNISOC and Amlogic.

After establishing a position early in the developing Chinese tablet SoC market, in 2012 it faced a challenge by Allwinner. In 2012, Rockchip shipped 10.5 million tablet processors, compared to 27.5 million for Allwinner. However, for Q3 2013, Rockchip was forecast to ship 6 million tablet-use application processors in China, compared to 7 million for Allwinner who mainly shipped single-core products. Rockchip was reported to be the number one supplier of tablet-use application processors in China in Q4 2013, Q1 2014 and Q2 2014.

Chinese SoC suppliers that do not have cellular baseband technology are at a disadvantage compared to companies such as MediaTek that also supply the smartphone market as white-box tablet makers increasingly add phone or cellular data functionality to their products.

Intel Corporation made investments into the tablet processor market, and was heavily subsidizing its entry into the low-cost tablet market as of 2014.

=== Cooperation with Intel ===
In May 2014, Intel announced an agreement with Rockchip to jointly deliver an Intel-branded mobile SoC platform based on Intel's Atom processor and 3G modem technology. Under the terms of the agreement, the two companies will deliver an Intel-branded mobile SoC platform. The quad-core platform will be based on an Intel Atom processor core integrated with Intel's 3G modem technology, and is expected to be available in the first half of 2015. Both Intel and Rockchip will sell the new part to OEMs and ODMs, primarily into each company's existing customer base.

As of October 2014, Rockchip was already offering Intel's XMM 6321, for low-end smartphones. It has two chips: a dual-core application processor (either with Intel processor cores or ARM Cortex-A5 cores) with integrated modem (XG632) and an integrated RF chip (AG620) that originates from the cellular chip division of Infineon Technologies (which Intel acquired some time ago). The application processor may also originate from Infineon or Intel. Rockchip has not earlier targeted the smartphone space in a material way.

== List of Rockchip SoC ==
=== ARMv7-A processors ===
Model Number	Fab	CPU					GPU			Memory Technology			Sampl. Avail- ability	Utilizing Devices
Model Number	Fab	ISA	μarch	Cores	Freq. (GHz)	L2 cache (KB)	μarch	Freq. (MHz)	GFlops	Type	Bus width	BW (GB/s)	Sampl. Avail- ability	Utilizing Devices
RK2918	55 nm	ARMv7-A	ARM Cortex-A8	1	1 – 1.2	512	Vivante GC800	575	4.6	DDR, DDR2, DDR3	?	?	2011	List: Cube U9GT2, CUBE U15GT, Teclast A15, Wopad i8, Orange TB9900, list of Jelly Bean upgradeable RK2918 tablets Videocon VT71, Innovel I703W, Odys Neo X7 / X8, Huawei MediaPad 7 Lite
RK2926	55 nm	ARMv7-A	ARM Cortex-A9	1	1.0	128	Mali-400 MP	400	3.6	?	32-bit	?	?	List: Avoca 7" Tablet STB7012
RK2928	55 nm	ARMv7-A	ARM Cortex-A9	1	1.0	?	Mali-400 MP	400	3.6	DDR3, DDR3L	32-bit	?	2012	List: Cube U25GT, Double Power(Dopo) M-975, Touchmate TM-MID720, Denver TAC-70072
RK3066	40 nm	ARMv7-A	ARM Cortex-A9	2	1.6	512	Mali-400 MP4	266	9.6	LPDDR-400, LPDDR2-800, DDR3-800, LVDDR3-800, up to 2 GiB	32-bit	3.2	2012	List: Boardcon MINI3066, Monster M7 tablet, HP Slate 7, Inar إينار, i.onik TP 10.1-1500DC-KB, Colorovo CityTab Vision 10.1", Teclast P76e Dual-core, Teclast P76t, Teclast P98, Teclast P85, Window (YuanDao) N70S, Window (YuanDao) N101 I, Cube U9GT3, Cube U9GT4, Cube U21GT, PIPO S2, Cube U30GT, Cube U9GT V, Cube U18GT Elite Dual Core, BlueBerry NetCat M-12, CHUWI V8 Dual-core, CHUWI V99, Aoson M11, Pipo S1, Ployer Momo7 IPS, Ployer Momo8, Ployer Momo11, Ployer Momo12, FNF ifive X, FNF ifive mini, Prestigio 7.0 Pro Duo (5570C), Probox2 Ultimate, Minix Neo G4, Minix Neo X5, Minix Neo X5 mini, Minix Neo X3, ICOO D70PROII, Ampe A78, Imito MX1, Imito MX2, Rikomagic MK802 III, Rikomagic MK802 IIIs, Tronsmart MK808, Tronsmart MK808B, JMI Tab T970, Joyplus DR-7, Cozyswan MK809, Cozyswan MK809 II, Ugoos UG802, Ugoos UG802II, Ugoos UG007, Ugoos UG008, Measy U2A, Measy U2C, iball Slide i9702, Kilwa V73, Tomato V8, Innovel I801B, DNS AirTab M76r, Danew Dslide972, Noblex NB8012, (Nexoc) Captiva Pad 10.1, Hisense Sero 7 LT, teXet TM-7047HD, teXet TM-9747, teXet TM-9747BT, teXet TM-9748
RK3026	40 nm	ARMv7-A	ARM Cortex-A9	2	1.0	?	Mali-400 MP2	500	9.0	DDR3, DDR3L	32-bit	?	Q3 2013	List: Blow WhiteTAB 7.2 Multimedia tablet, Odys Bravio
RK3036	40 nm	ARMv7-A	ARM Cortex-A7	2	1.0	?	Mali-400 MP	500	9.0	DDR3-1066, DDR3L-1066	16-bit	?	Q4 2014	
RK3126	40 nm	ARMv7-A	ARM Cortex-A7	4	1.2	256	Mali-400 MP2	600	10.8	DDR3-1066, DDR3L-1066	16-bit	?	Q4 2014	
RK3128	40 nm	ARMv7-A	ARM Cortex-A7	4	1.2	256	Mali-400 MP2	600	10.8	DDR3-1066, DDR3L-1066, LPDDR2-1066	32-bit	?	Q4 2014	List: Boardcon Compact3128
RK3168	28 nm HKMG	ARMv7-A	ARM Cortex-A9	2	1.2	256	PowerVR SGX540	600	9.6	DDR3-1066, DDR3L-1066, LPDDR2-1066	32-bit	?	2013	List: RCA RCT6378W2, Toshiba Excite 7cJazz UltraTab C855
RK3188	28 nm HKMG	ARMv7-A	ARM Cortex-A9	4	1.6	512	Mali-400 MP4	533	19.2	Up to 800 MHz LPDDR2, DDR3/3L, up to 2 GiB	32-bit	6.4	2013	List: Boardcon EM3188 SBC, Asus MemoPad 8, Asus MemoPad 10, Toshiba Excite 7, Minix Neo X7/Neo X7 mini, GoTab GTQ97, Cube Pea II, Cube U30GT2, CloudnetGo CR9, iMito QX1, PIPO M8pro, PIPO M9, PIPO M7 PRO, Rikomagic MK802 IV, Ugoos UG802B, Ugoos UG007B, Ugoos MK809 III, Ugoos QC802, Measy U4B, Tronsmart MK908, Tronsmart T428, Measy U4B, Freelander PD800, FNF iFive x2 Vido Mini One, JXD S7800b, Tesco Hudl, SteelCore10III, teXet TM-9750HD, teXet TM-9757, teXet TM-9758, teXet TM-9767, teXet TM-9768H, Radxa Rock, Loosen RAM use Greenify, GoClever ORION 100, Medion LifeTab S7852,
RK3188T	28 nm HKMG	ARMv7-A	ARM Cortex-A9	4	1.4	512	Mali-400 MP4	+-400	14.4	Up to 800 MHz LPDDR2, DDR3/3L, up to 2 GiB	32-bit	?	2013	
RK3229	28 nm HKMG	ARMv7-A	ARM Cortex-A7	4	1.5	256	Mali-400 MP2	600	10.8	LPDDR2/3, DDR3/3L, up to 2 GiB				
RK3288	28 nm HKMG	ARMv7-A	ARM Cortex-A17	4	1.8	1024	Mali-T760 MP4 (listed as Mali-T764)	600	81.6	DDR3/3L-1333, LPDDR2/3-1066, up to 4 GiB	32-bit dual channel	?	Q3 2014	List: Boardcon EM3288 SBC, Pipo P1, Pipo P8, Teclast P90HD, Tronsmart Orion R28, FNF iFive Mini 4 Insignia - Flex Elite 7.85", Asus Chromebook C201, Chromebit CS10 and Chromebook Flip C100P, Lenovo MiniStation, Asus Tinkerboard

=== ARMv8-A processors ===
Model Number	Fab	CPU					GPU			Memory Technology			Sampl. Avail- ability	Utilizing Devices
Model Number	Fab	ISA	μarch	Cores	Freq. (GHz)	L2 cache (KB)	μarch	Freq. (MHz)	GFlops	Type	Bus width	Max	Sampl. Avail- ability	Utilizing Devices
RK3308	?	ARMv8-A	ARM Cortex-A35	4	?	?	?	?	?	?	?	?	?	?
RK3318	28 nm HKMG	ARMv8-A	ARM Cortex-A53	4	1.5	?	Mali-450 MP5	750+	?	?	?	?	Q1 2019	List: Wechip H603 X96H; Wechip X88 pro; H96 Max; TV Box A95X R3; S96 MAX; A95X Z2
RK3328	28 nm HKMG	ARMv8-A	ARM Cortex-A53	4	1.5	256	Mali-450 MP2	?	?	DDR3, DDR3L, LPDDR3, DDR4	32-bit	?	Q1 2017	List: ROCK64; ROC-RK3328-CC
RK3368	28 nm HKMG	ARMv8-A	2 × ARM Cortex-A53 (big.LITTLE)	4+4	1.5	512 (Big cluster), 256 (Little cluster)	PowerVR G6110	600	38.4	LPDDR2, DDR3, DDR3L, LPDDR3	32-bit	?	Q1 2015	List: Tronsmart Orion R68; GeekBox
RK3399	28 nm HKMG	ARMv8-A	ARM Cortex-A72 & ARM Cortex-A53 (big.LITTLE with GTS)	2+4	2.0 (A72) 1.5 (A53)	1024 (Big cluster), 512 (Little cluster)	Mali-T860 MP4	600	81.6	LPDDR2, DDR3, DDR3L, LPDDR3, LPDDR4	2 channels, each 16-bit or 32-bit, up to 4 GB	?	Q2 2016	List: iFive 2-in-1, Techvision 2-in-1, FenMi TV box, Boardcon EM3399 SBC, Ugoos UT5 TV box, Samsung Chromebook Plus OP1, PiPo V5 Android VR Headset
RK3588	8 nm	ARMv8.2-A	4 x ARM Cortex-A76 & ARM Cortex-A55 (big.LITTLE)	4+4	2.2-2.4	512 (Big cluster), 128 (Little cluster)	Mali-G610 MP4	1000	?	LPDDR4, LPDDR4X, LPDDR5	4 channels, each 16bits	32GB	2022	List Boardcon CM3588 SOM, Firefly ROC-RK3588S-PC, Turing RK1, Orange Pi 5 (Pro/Plus)

=== Tablet processors with integrated modem ===
Model Number	Fab	CPU					GPU			Memory Technology			Integrated Wireless Technology	Sampl. Avail- ability	Utilizing Devices
Model Number	Fab	ISA	μarch	Cores	Freq. (GHz)	L2 cache (KB)	μarch	Freq. (MHz)	GFlops	Type	Bus width	BW (GB/s)	Integrated Wireless Technology	Sampl. Avail- ability	Utilizing Devices
x3-C3130	28 nm	x86-64	Intel Atom SoFIA 3G	2	1.0	512	Mali-400MP2	480	8.64	1x32bit LPDDR2 800, up to 1 GB	32-bit	3.2	HSPA+ 21/5.8, GSM/GPRS/EDGE, DSDS, Wi-Fi, BT 4.0 LE, GPS, GLONASS, FM	Q1'15	
x3-C3200RK	28 nm	x86-64	Intel Atom SoFIA 3G-R	4	1.1	1024	Mali-450MP4	600	35.8	1x32bit LPDDR2/3 1066, 2x16bit DDR3L 1333, up to 2 GB	32-bit	4.2	Wi-Fi	Q1'15	
x3-C3205RK	28 nm	x86-64	Intel Atom SoFIA 3G-R	4	1.2	1024	Mali-450MP4	600	35.8	1x32bit LPDDR2/3 1066, 2x16bit DDR3L 1333, up to 2 GB	32-bit	4.2	Wi-Fi	Q4'16	
x3-C3230RK	28 nm	x86-64	Intel Atom SoFIA 3G-R	4	1.1	1024	Mali-450MP4	600	35.8	1x32bit LPDDR2/3 1066, 2x16bit DDR3L 1333, up to 2 GB	32-bit	4.2	HSPA+ 21/5.8, GSM/GPRS/EDGE, DSDS, Wi-Fi, BT 4.0 LE, GPS, GLONASS, FM	Q'15	
x3-C3235RK	28 nm	x86-64	Intel Atom SoFIA 3G-R	4	1.2	1024	Mali-450MP4	600	35.8	1x32bit LPDDR2/3 1066, 2x16bit DDR3L 1333, up to 2 GB	32-bit	4.2	HSPA+ 21/5.8, GSM/GPRS/EDGE, DSDS, Wi-Fi, BT 4.0 LE, GPS, GLONASS, FM	Q4'15	
x3-C3265RK	28 nm	x86-64	Intel Atom SoFIA 3G-R	4	1.1	1024	Mali-450MP4	600	35.8	1x32bit LPDDR2/3 1066, 2x16bit DDR3L 1333, up to 2 GB	32-bit	4.2	HSPA+ 21/5.8, GSM/GPRS/EDGE, DSDS, Wi-Fi, BT 4.0 LE, GPS, GLONASS, FM	Q4'16	
x3-C3295RK	28 nm	x86-64	Intel Atom SoFIA 3G-R	4	1.1	1024	Mali-450MP4	600	35.8	1x32bit LPDDR2/3 1066, 2x16bit DDR3L 1333, up to 2 GB	32-bit	4.2	HSPA+ 21/5.8, GSM/GPRS/EDGE, DSDS, Wi-Fi, BT 4.0 LE, GPS, GLONASS, FM	Q4'16	
x3-C3440	28 nm	x86-64	Intel Atom SoFIA LTE	4	1.4	1024	Mali-T720MP2	600	20.4	1 × LPDDR2/3 1066, 2 × 16-bit DDR3/DDR3L 1066	32-bit	4.2	LTE FDD/TDD up to Cat 6, DC-HSPA+ 42/11, TD-SCDMA, GSM/GPRS/EDGE, DSDS, Wi-Fi, BT 4.1 LE, GPS, GLONASS, Beidou, FM, NFC	Q1'15	
x3-C3405	28 nm	x86-64	Intel Atom SoFIA LTE	4	1.4	1024	Mali-T720MP2	456	15.5	1 × LPDDR2/3 1066	32-bit	4.2	Wi-Fi	Q1'15	
x3-C3445	28 nm	x86-64	Intel Atom SoFIA LTE	4	1.4	1024	Mali-T720MP2	456	15.5	1 × LPDDR2/3 1066	32-bit	4.2	LTE FDD/TDD up to Cat 6, DC-HSPA+ 42/11, TD-SCDMA, GSM/GPRS/EDGE, DSDS, Wi-Fi, BT 4.1 LE, GPS, GLONASS, Beidou, FM, NFC	Q1'15	
