= Rockchip =

Chinese fabless semiconductor company

Coordinates: 26.112846°N 119.264960°E

Fuzhou Rockchip Electronics Co., Ltd.
- Native name: 瑞芯微电子股份有限公司
- Type: Public
- Traded as: SSE: 603893
- Industry: Fabless semiconductor; Consumer electronics
- Founded: Fuzhou; 2001; 25 years ago
- Headquarters: Fuzhou, Fujian, China
- Area served: Worldwide, but primarily China
- Key people: Min Li (CEO); Feng Chen (Vice President)
- Products: Semiconductors, SoC (System-on-chip)
- Number of employees: 700+ (2017)
- Website: www.rock-chips.com

Rockchip (Fuzhou Rockchip Electronics Co., Ltd.) is a Chinese fabless semiconductor company based in Fuzhou, Fujian province. It has offices in Shanghai, Beijing, Shenzhen, Hangzhou and Hong Kong. It designs system on a chip (SoC) products, using the ARM architecture licensed from ARM Holdings for the majority of its projects.

Rockchip was one of the top 50 fabless IC suppliers in 2018. The company established cooperation with Google, Microsoft and Intel. On 27 May 2014, Intel announced an agreement with Rockchip to adopt the Intel architecture for entry-level tablets.

Rockchip is a supplier of SoCs to Chinese white-box tablet manufacturers as well as supplying OEMs such as Asus, HP, Samsung and Toshiba. Rockchip has been providing SoC products for tablets & PCs, streaming media TV boxes, AI audio & vision, IoT hardware since founded in 2001.

== Products ==
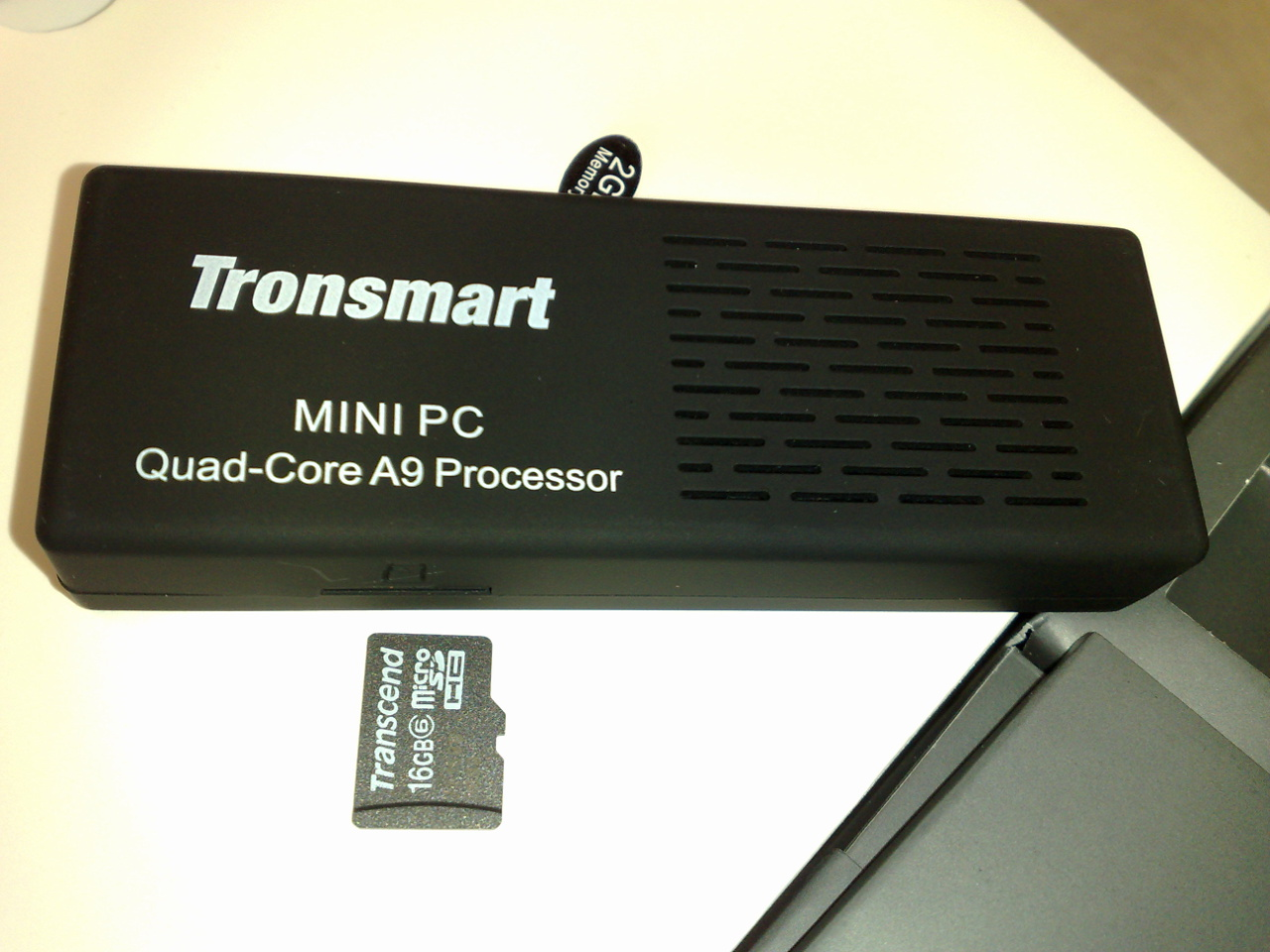
Tronsmart MK908, a Rockchip-based quad-core Android "mini PC", with a microSD card next to it for a size comparison.

=== Featured Products ===
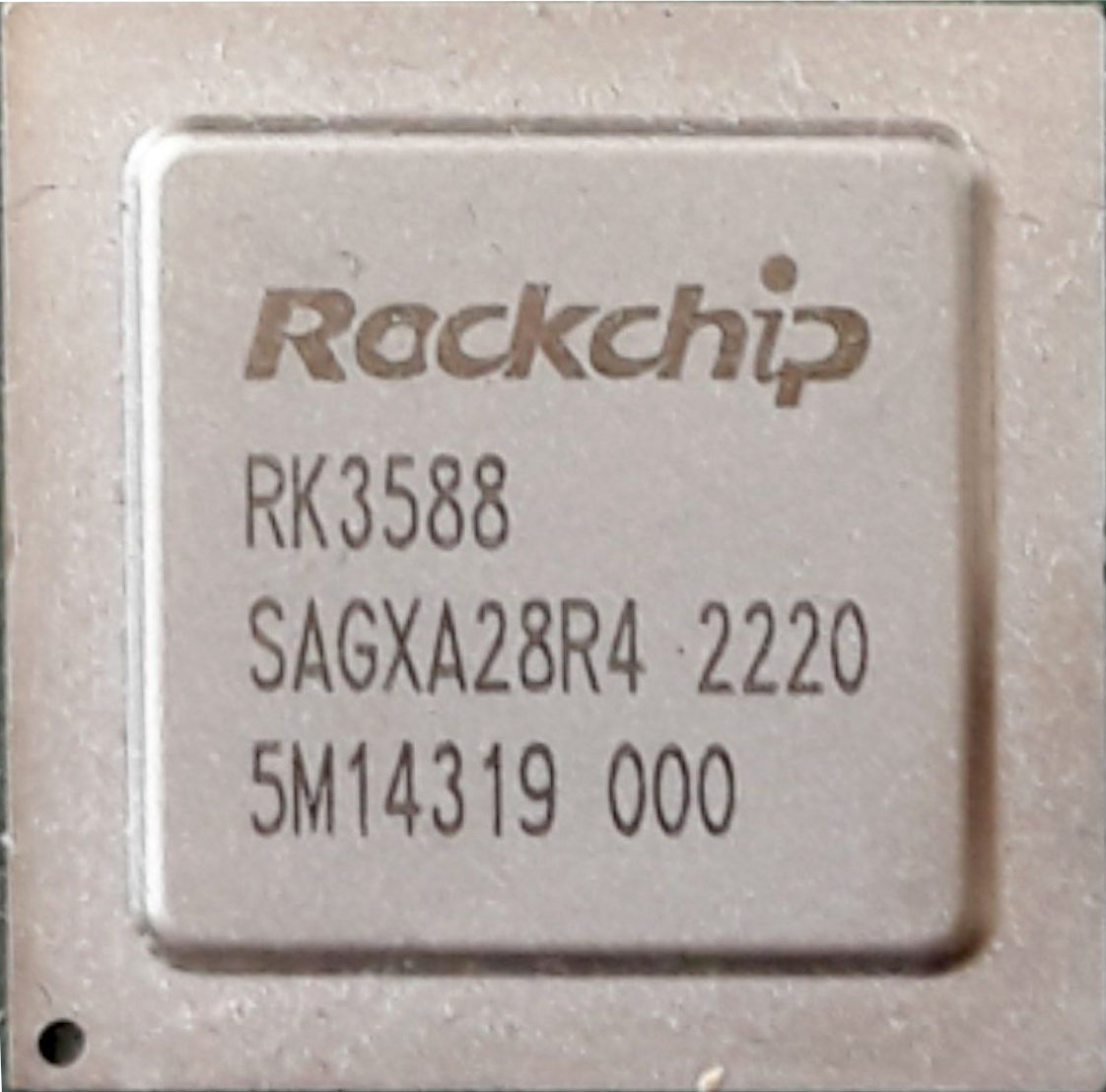
RK3588

The RK3588 is Rockchip's current flagship SoC. It has feature-reduced versions, including RK3582, RK3588S, and RK3588S2.

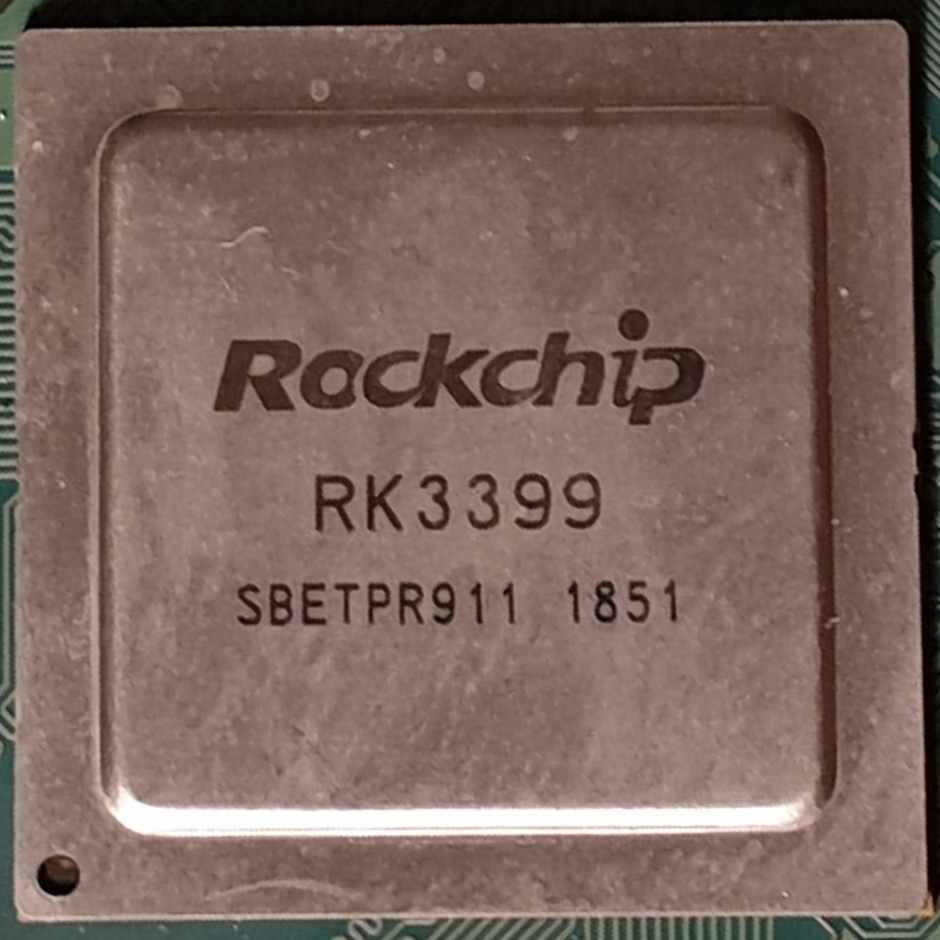
RK3399

The RK3399 is Rockchip's previous flagship SoC, and predecessor of the RK3588.

Dual Cortex-A72 and Quad Cortex-A53 and Mali-T860MP4 GPU, provide computing and multi-media performance, interfaces and peripherals. The GPU supports OpenGL ES 3.2, Vulkan 1.0, OpenCL 1.1/1.2, and OpenVX 1.0, while the AI interfaces support TensorFlow Lite/AndroidNN.

RK3399 Linux source code and hardware documents are on GitHub and Rockchip's open-source Wiki.

RK3399	CPU	GPU	Memory	Video Decoder	Video Encoder	Display Interface	ISP	Camera Sensor Interface	USB	Digital Audio Interface
RK3399	Dual Cortex-A72 + Quad Cortex-A53, 64-bit	Mali-T860	Dual-channel DDR3-1866/DDR3L-1866/LPDDR3-1866/LPDDR4, eMMC 5.1	Up to 4KP60 H.265/H.264/VP9	Up to 1080P30 H.264	HDMI 2.0, 2x MIPI DSI, eDP	13M	Dual-channel MIPI CSI-2 receive interface	Dual USB 3.0 with Type-C supported	1× I²S/PCM (2ch), 2× I²S (8ch), S/PDIF

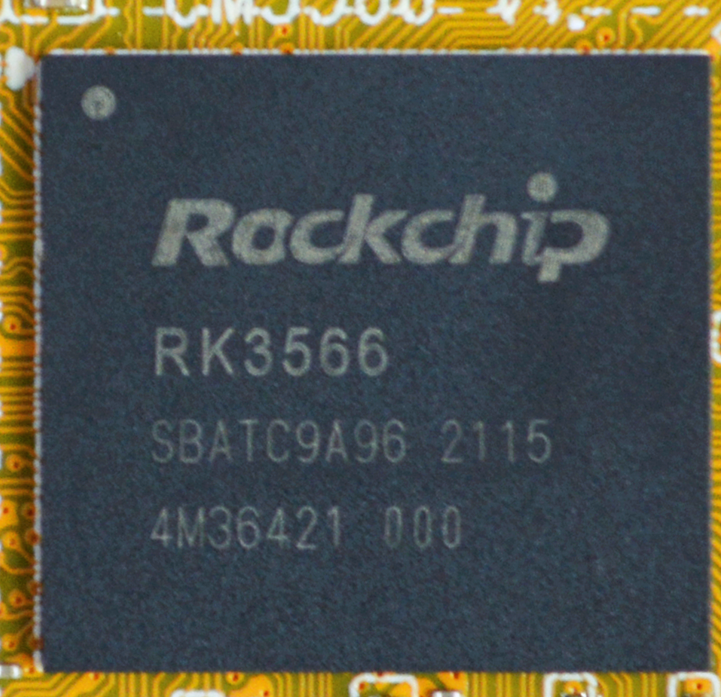
RK3566

RK3566 is a successor to the RK3288 and outperforms it significantly, with a quad-core Arm Cortex-A55 CPU and an Arm Mali-G52 GPU. Boards based on it are expected to be on sale in early 2021 from manufacturers like Pine64 and Boardcon.

RK3566	CPU	GPU	External Memory Interface	Video Decoder	Video Encoder	Display Interface	ISP	Camera Sensor Interface	USB	Digital Audio Interface
RK3566	Quad-core ARM Cortex-A55 with Neon and FPU, 22 nm process, up to 2.0 GHz	Mali-G52	DDR4/DDR3/DDR3L/LPDDR4/LPDDR4X/LPDDR3	4KP60 H.264/H.265/VP9	1080P60 H.264, H.265	LVDS/MIPI DSI, HDMI 2.0, eDP, E Ink	8M with HDR	MIPI-CSI2, 1x4-lane/2×2-lane	USB 2.0 Host, USB2.0 OTG; 1× USB 3.0 Host	8ch PDM, SPDIF

RK3288 is a high-performance IoT platform, Quad-core Cortex-A17 CPU and Mali-T760MP4 GPU, 4K video decoding and 4K display out. It is applied to products of various industries including Vending Machine, Commercial Display, Medical Equipment, Gaming, Intelligent POS, Interactive Printer, Robot and Industrial Computer.

RK3288 Linux source code and hardware documents are on GitHub and Wiki opensource website.

RK3288	CPU	GPU	External Memory Interface	Video Decoder	Video Encoder	Display Interface	ISP	Camera Sensor Interface	USB	Digital Audio Interface
RK3288	Quad-Core Cortex-A17	Mali-T760MP4 GPU	Dual-channel DDR3/DDR3L/LPDDR2/LPDDR3 SLC/MLC/TLC NAND flash, eMMC 4.5	Up to 4KP60 H.265/H.264/VP9	Up to 1080P30 H.264	HDMI2.0, 2× MIPI DSI, LVDS, eDP, Parallel RGB	13M	Parallel CIF, MIPI CSI-2	1× USB 2.0 OTG, 2× USB 2.0 Host	1× I^{2}S(8ch), S/PDIF

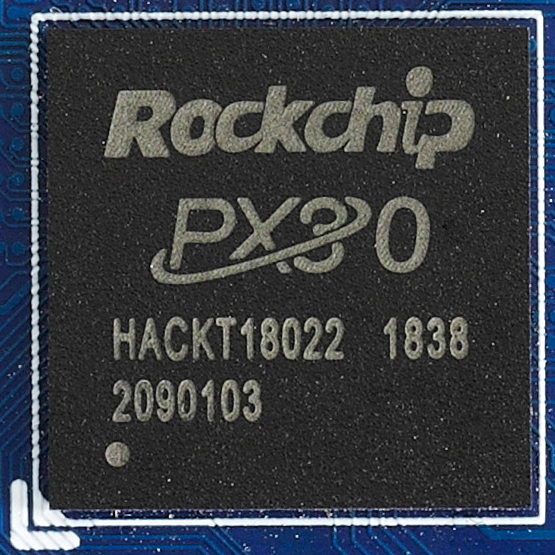
PX30

RK3326 and PX30 were announced in 2018, marketed for AI. PX30 is a variant of RK3326 targeting the IoT market, supporting dual VOP. Both use Arm's Cortex-A35 CPU and Mali-G31 GPU.

Feature	CPU	GPU	External Memory Interface	Video Decoder	Video Encoder	Display Interface	ISP	Camera Sensor Interface	USB	Digital Audio Interface
PX30	Quad-Core Cortex-A35	Mali-G31 GPU	32-bit DDR4-1600/DDR3-1600/DDR3L-1600/LPDDR3-1600/LPDDR2-1066 MLC NAND, NOR flash, eMMC 4.5	1080P60 H.264/H.265	1080P30 H.264	MIPI DSI, Parallel RGB, LVDS, *Supports dual VOP	8M	MIPI CSI and DVP Sensor interface	USB 2.0 Host & OTG	2× I2S/PCM(2ch); 1× I2S/TDM(8ch); 1× PDM(8ch)
RK3326	Quad-Core Cortex-A35	Mali-G31 GPU	32-bit DDR4-1600/DDR3-1600/DDR3L-1600/LPDDR3-1600/LPDDR2-1066 MLC NAND, NOR flash, eMMC 4.5	1080P60 H.264/H.265	1080P30 H.264	MIPI DSI, Parallel RGB, LVDS	8M	MIPI CSI and DVP Sensor interface	USB2.0 OTG	2× I2S/PCM(2ch); 1× I2S/TDM(8ch); 1 x PDM(8ch)

RK3308 is an entry-level product line for mainstream devices. The chip has multiple audio input interfaces, and greater energy efficiency, featuring embedded voice activation detection).

RK3308	CPU	Audio	Memory		Connectivity		
RK3308	Quad-Core Cortex-A35	Embedded Audio CODEC with 8xADC,2xDAC	16-bit DDR3-1066/DDR3L-1066/DDR2-1066/LPDDR2-1066	SLC NAND, eMMC 4.51, Serial NOR flash	2x 8ch I2S/TDM, 1x 8ch PDM, 1x 2ch I2S/PCM	SPDIF IN/OUT, HDMI ARC	SDIO3.0, USB2.0 OTG, USB2.0 Host, I2C, UART, SPI, I2S

The announcement of RV1108 indicated Rockchip's move to AI/computer vision territory.

With CEVA DSP embedded, RV1108 powers smart cameras including 360° Video Camera, IPC, Drone, Car Camcoder, Sport DV, VR, etc. It also has been deployed for new retail and intelligent marketing applications with integrated algorithms.

RV1108	CPU	DSP	External Memory Interface	Video Decoder	Video Encoder	Display Interface	ISP	Camera Sensor Interface	USB	Digital Audio Interface
RV1108	Cortex-A7	CEVA XM4 DSP	16-bit DDR3/DDR3L SPI NOR flash, SLC NAND, eMMC	1440P30 H.264	1440P30 H.264	HDMI 1.4, MIPI DSI, Parallel RGB, CVBS OUT	8M with WDR	MIPI CSI-2, CVBS IN	1x USB 2.0 OTG 1x USB 2.0 Host	2x I2S/PCM (2ch) 1x I2S (8ch)

=== Early Products ===
RK26xx series - Released 2006.

RK27xx series - Rockchip was first known for their RK27xx series that was very efficient at MP3/MP4 decoding and was integrated in many low-cost personal media player (PMP) products.

RK28xx series

The RK2806 was targeted at PMPs.

The RK2808A is an ARM926EJ-S derivative. Along with the ARM core a DSP coprocessor is included. The native clock speed is 560 MHz. ARM rates the performance of the ARM926EJ-S at 1.1 DMIPS/MHz the performance of the Rockchip 2808 when executing ARM instructions is therefore 660 DMIPS roughly 26% the speed of Apple's A4 processor. The DSP coprocessor can support the real-time decoding of 720p video files at bitrates of up to 2.5 Mbit/s. This chip was the core of many Android and Windows Mobile-based mobile internet devices.

The RK2816 was targeted at PMP devices, and MIDs. It has the same specifications as the RK2806 but also includes HDMI output, Android support, and up to 720p hardware video acceleration.

RK29xx series

The Rockchip RK291x is a family of SoCs based on the ARM Cortex-A8 CPU core. They were presented for the first time at CES 2011. The RK292x are single core SoCs based on ARM Cortex-A9 and were first introduced in 2012.

The RK2918 was the first chip to decode Google WebM VP8 in hardware. It uses a dynamically configurable companion core to process various codecs. It encodes and decodes H.264 at 1080p, and can decode many standard video formats including Xvid, H.263, AVS, MPEG4, RV, and WMV. It includes a Vivante GC800 GPU that is compatible with OpenGL ES 2.0 and OpenVG. The RK2918 is compatible with Android Froyo (2.2), Gingerbread (2.3), HoneyComb (3.x) and Ice Cream Sandwich (4.0). Unofficial support for Ubuntu and other Linux flavours exists. As of 2013, it was targeted at E-readers.

The RK2906 is basically a cost-reduced version of the RK2918, also targeted at E-readers as of 2013.

The Rockchip RK2926 and RK2928 feature a single core ARM Cortex A9 running at a speed up to 1.0 GHz. It replaces the Vivante GC800 GPU of the older RK291x series with an ARM Mali-400 GPU. As of 2013, the RK2926 was targeted at tablets, while the RK2928 was targeted at tablets and Android TV dongles and boxes.

The RK3066 is a high-performance dual-core ARM Cortex-A9 mobile processor similar to the Samsung Exynos 4 Dual Core chip. In terms of performance, the RK3066 is between the Samsung Exynos 4210 and the Samsung Exynos 4212. As of 2013, it was targeted at tablets and Android TV dongles and boxes. It has been a popular choice for both tablets and other devices since 2012.

The RK3068 is a version of the RK3066 specifically targeted at Android TV dongles and boxes. Its package is much smaller than the RK3066.

The RK3028 is a low-cost dual-core ARM Cortex-A9-based processor clocked at 1.0 GHz with ARM Mali-400 GPU. It is pin-compatible with the RK2928. It is used in a few kids tablets and low-cost Android HDMI TV dongles.

The RK3026 is an updated ultra-low-end dual-core ARM Cortex-A9-based tablet processor clocked at 1.0 GHz with ARM Mali-400 MP2 GPU. Manufactured at 40 nm, it is pin-compatible with the RK2926. It features 1080p H.264 video encoding and 1080p decoding in multiple formats. Supporting Android 4.4, it has been adopted for low-end tablets in 2014.

The RK3036 is a low-cost dual-core ARM Cortex-A7-based processor released in Q4 2014 for smart set-top boxes with support for H.265 video decoding.

=== RK31xx series ===
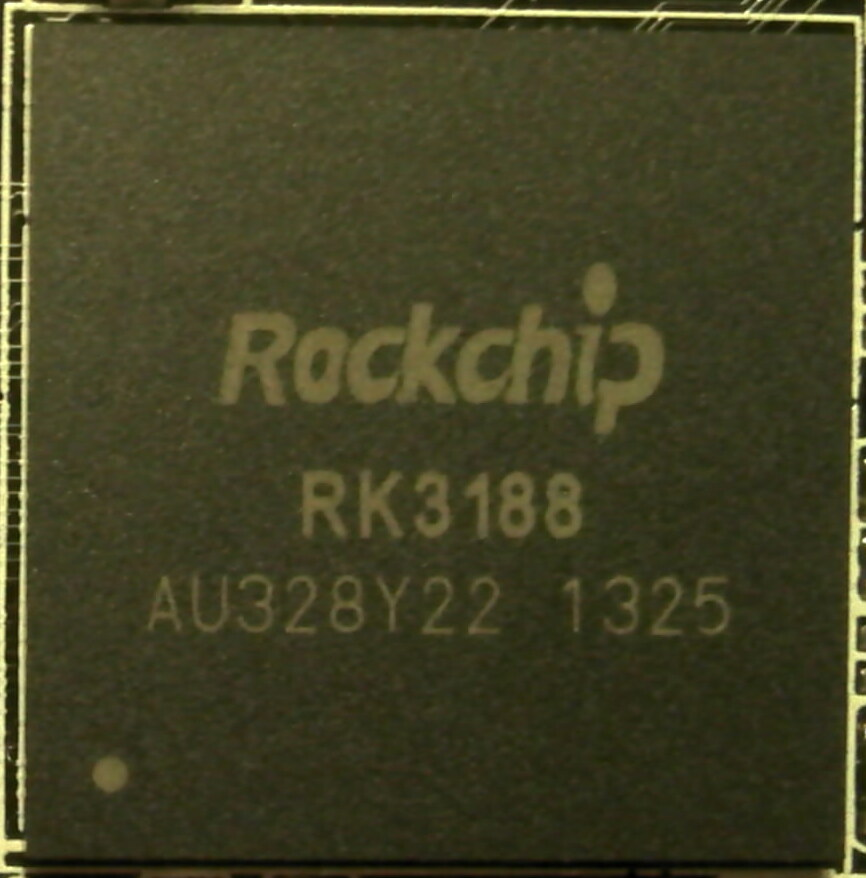
RK3188

The RK3188 was the first product in the RK31xx series, announced for production in the 2nd quarter of 2013. The RK3188 features a quad-core ARM Cortex-A9 clocked up to 1.6 GHz frequency. It is targeted at tablets and Android TV dongles and boxes, and has been a popular choice for both tablets and other devices requiring good performance.

- 28 nm HKMG process at GlobalFoundries
- Quad-core ARM Cortex-A9, up to 1.6 GHz
- 512 KB L2 cache
- Mali-400 MP4 GPU, up to 600 MHz (typically 533 MHz) supporting OpenGL ES 1.1/2.0, OpenVG 1.1
- High-performance dedicated 2D processor
- DDR3, DDR3L, LPDDR2 support
- Dual-panel display up to 2048×1536 resolution

The RK3188T is a lower-clocked version of the RK3188, with the CPU cores running at a maximum speed of 1.4 GHz instead of 1.6 GHz. The Mali-400MP4 GPU is also clocked at a lower speed. As of early 2014, many devices advertised as using a RK3188 with a maximum clock speed of 1.6 GHz actually have a RK3188T with clock speed limited to 1.4 GHz. Operating system ROMs specifically made for the RK3188 may not work correctly with a RK3188T.

The RK3168, first shown in April 2013, is a dual-core Cortex A9-based CPU, also manufactured using the 28 nm process. It is targeted at low-end tablets. The chip has seen only limited use as of May 2014.

The RK3126 is an entry-level tablet processor introduced in Q4 2014. Manufactured using a 40 nm process, it features a quad-core Cortex-A7 CPU up to 1.3 GHz and a Mali-400 MP2 GPU. It is pin-compatible with RK3026 and RK2926.

- 40 nm process
- Quad-core ARM Cortex-A7, up to 1.3 GHz
- Mali-400 MP2 GPU
- High-performance dedicated 2D processor
- DDR3, DDR3L memory interface
- 1080p multi-format video decoding and 1080p video encoding for H.264

The RK3128 is a higher-end variant of RK3126, also to be introduced in Q4 2014, that features more integrated external interfaces, including CVBS, HDMI, Ethernet MAC, S/PDIF, Audio DAC, and USB. It targets more fully featured tablets and set-top boxes.

=== RK32xx series ===
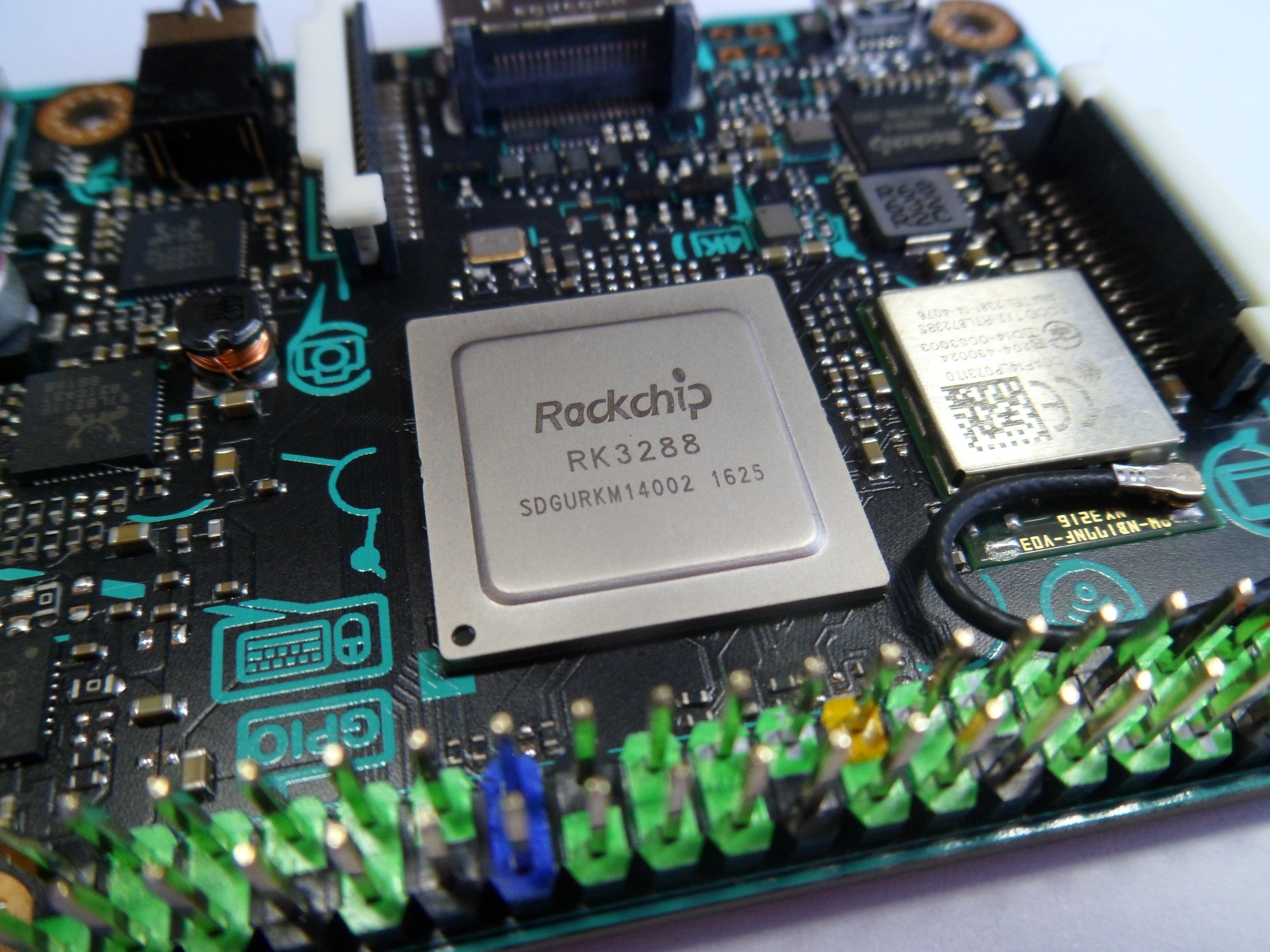
An RK3288 installed on an Asus Tinker Board

Rockchip has announced the RK3288 for production in the second quarter of 2014. Recent information suggests that the chip uses a quad-core ARM Cortex-A17 CPU, although technically ARM Cortex-A12, which as of October 1, 2014, ARM has decided to also refer to as Cortex-A17 because the latest production version of Cortex-A12 performs at a similar performance level as Cortex-A17.

- 28 nm HKMG process.
- Quad-core ARM Cortex-A17, up to 1.8 GHz
- Quad-core ARM Mali-T760 MP4 (also incorrectly called Mali-T764) GPU clocked at 600 MHz supporting OpenGL ES 1.1/2.0/3.0/3.1, OpenCL 1.1, Renderscript, Direct3D 11.1
- High-performance dedicated 2D processor
- 1080P video encoding for H.264 and VP8, MVC
- 4K H.264 and 10-bit H.265 video decode, 1080p multi-video decode
- Supports 4Kx2K H.265 resolution
- Dual-channel DDR3, DDR3L, LPDDR2, LPDDR3
- Up to 3840×2160 display output, HDMI 2.0

==== RK3288 controversy ====
Early reports including Rockchip first suggested in summer 2013 that the RK3288 was originally designed using a quad-core ARM Cortex-A12 configuration. Rockchip's primary foundry partner GlobalFoundries announced a partnership with ARM to optimize the ARM Cortex-A12 for their 28 nm-SLP process. This is the same process used for earlier Rockchip chips such as the RK3188, and matches the choice of Cortex-A12 cores in the design of the RK3288.

In January 2014, official marketing materials listed the CPU cores as ARM Cortex-A17. At the CES electronics show in January 2014, someone apparently corrected the CPU specification as being ARM Cortex-A12 instead of Cortex-A17 on one of the panels of their show booth. However, since then, official specifications from Rockchip's website and marketing materials as well specifications used by device manufacturers have continued to describe the CPU as a quad-core ARM Cortex-A17.

Recent testing of early RK3288-based TV boxes (August/September 2014) provided evidence that the RK3288 technically contains Cortex-A12 cores, since the "ARM 0xc0d" CPU architecture reported by CPU-Z for Android is the reference for Cortex-A12, while the original Cortex-A17 is referred to as "ARM 0xc0e".

However, on the ARM community website, ARM clarified the situation on October 1, 2014, saying that Cortex-A12, for which Rockchip is one of the few known customers, will be called Cortex-A17 from now on, and that all references to Cortex-A12 have been removed from ARM's website. ARM explained that the latest production revision of Cortex-A12 now performs close to the level of Cortex-A17 because the improvements of the Cortex-A17 now also have been applied to the latest version of Cortex-A12. In this way, Rockchip now gets the official blessing from ARM for listing the cores inside the RK3288 as Cortex-A17.

The first Android TV stick based on RK3288 was launched in November 2014 ("ZERO Devices Z5C Thinko").

=== RK33xx series ===
Rockchip announced RK3368, the first member of the RK33xx family, at the CES show in January 2015. The RK3368 is a SoC targeting tablets and media boxes featuring a 64-bit octa-core Cortex-A53 CPU and an OpenGL ES 3.1-class GPU.

- 64-bit Octa-Core Cortex-A53, up to 1.5 GHz
- High-performance PowerVR SGX6110 GPU with support for OpenGL 3.1 and OpenGL ES 3.0
- 4Kx2K H.264/H.265 real-time video playback
- HDMI 2.0 with 4Kx2K @ 60 fps display output

The RK3399, also available as the higher-binned OP1 variant, announced by ARM at Mobile World Congress in February 2016, features six 64 bit CPUs, including 2 Cortex-A72 and 4 Cortex-A53. The RK3399 is used for the development of the open source Panfrost driver for ARM Mali GPU Midgard series.

Consumer devices include Asus Chromebook Flip C101PA-DB02, Asus Chromebook Tablet CT100, Samsung Chromebook Plus, and Pine64 Pinebook Pro.

SBCs include 96Boards RK1808, Boardcon EM3399, Firefly RK3399, Khadas Edge, Lenovo Leez LP710, NanoPi M4B, Rock Pi 4, Pine64 RockPro64, Orange Pi 4, and Zidoo M9.

SOMs include BeiQi RK3399Pro AIoT (Compatible 96boards), Boardcon PICO3399 SO-DIMM, and Geniatech SOM3399 RK3399 (Compatible 96boards).

The RK3399Pro is a version of the RK3399 that includes a 2.4 TOPS NPU.

SBCs include Rock Pi N10, Toybrick RK3399Pro, and VMARC RK3399Pro SoM Ficus2 Evaluation Board. SOM example is VMARC RK3399Pro SoM.

=== RK35xx series ===
The RK3566 was expected to be available in Q2 2020, with the following specifications:

- CPU – Quad-core ARM Cortex-A55 @ 1.8 GHz
- GPU – ARM Mali-G52 2EE MC1
- NPU – 1 TOPS with support for INT8/ INT16
- Multi-Media
  - 8M ISP 2.0 with 3F HDR (Line-based/Frame-based/DCG)
  - Support MIPI-CSI2,4-lane
  - 1080p60 H.265, H.264 encoding
  - 4K H.264/H.265/VP9 60 fps video decoder
  - DVP interface with BT.656/BT.1120
- Memory – 32-bit DDR3L/LPDDR3/DDR4/LPDDR4/LPDDR4X
- Storage – eMMC 4.51, NAND Flash, SFC NOR flash, SATA 3.0, SD card via SDIO
- Display
  - Support Dual Display
  - MIPI-DSI/RGB interface
  - LVDS/eDP/DP
  - HDMI 2.0
- Audio – 2 × 8-ch I2S, 2 × 2-ch I2S, PDM, TDM, SPDIF
- Networking – 2 × RGMII interfaces (Gigabit Ethernet) with TSO (TCP segmentation offload ) network acceleration
- USB – USB 2.0 OTG and USB 2.0 host; USB3.0 host
- Other peripherals
  - PCIe
  - 3 × SDIO 3.0 interface for Wi-Fi and SD card
  - 6 × I2C, 10 × UART, 4 × SPI, 8 × PWM, 2 × CAN interface

RK3566-based SBC example are Pine64 Quartz64, Boardcon EM3566 SBC, Compact3566. and SoM example are Boardcon CM3566, PICO3566.

RK3568-based SBC example are Firefly Station P2, Boardcon EM3568, and SOM example are Core-3568J AI Core Board, CM3568 SOM.

The RK3576 is low-cost SoC with 8-cores older Cortex-A72 and Cortex-A53. It was expected to be available in Q4 2023.

- CPU
  - Octa-core ARM processor with 4x Cortex-A72 cores at 2.2 GHz, 4x Cortex-A53 cores at 1.8 GHz
  - ARM Cortex-M0 MCU at 400 MHz for user
- GPU – ARM Mali-G52 MC3 GPU at 1.0 GHz
- VPU
  - 4Kp120 H.265, H.264, AV1, VP9, AVS2 video decoder –
  - 4Kp30 H.264/H.265 video encoder
  - 4Kp30 MPEG encoder and decoder
  - Supports for 4Kp120 + 2.5Kp60 + 1080p60
- NPU – 6 TOPS NPU with INT4/8/16/FP16/BF16/TF32
- Memory – 32-bit LPDDR4/LPDDR4x/LPDDR5
- Storage
  - UFS 2.1 w/ HS-G3 (12Gbit/s)
  - FSPI (Octa), eMMC 5.1, SDMMC 3.0
- Video Output
  - HDMI 2.1 up to 4Kp120 or eDP 1.3 up to 4Kp60 Combo Tx
  - MIPI DSI-2 up to 4K60
  - DisplayPort 1.4 up to 4Kp120
  - ePD (Electronic Paper Display) up to 2560×1920
  - Parallel interface (RGB888) up to 1080p60
- Camera I/F
  - 2x MIPI CSI-2 with D-PHY (4×1, 2×2)
  - 1x MIPI CSI-2 with C/D-PHY (4×1)
  - 1x 8/10/12/16-bit DVP
  - Picture Quality – Deinterlace, De-noise, Zoom Manage Engine, Sharpness, Edge Smoothing, DCI-HIST, 3D-LUT, ACM, HDR
- Audio
  - I2S/TDM/PCM (2x 4T4R, 3x 2T2R)
  - 2x 8CH PDM
  - 2x S/PDIF
  - ASRC (2x 2CH + 2x 4CH)
- Networking – 2x RGMII interface, i.e. dual gigabit Ethernet
- USB – 1x USB 3.2 Gen 1 with support for Type-C Alt Mode with DisplayPort
- PCIe
  - 1x PCIe 2.1/SATA 3.1/USB 3.2 Gen1 combo port
  - 1x PCIe 2.1/SATA 3.1 combo port
- Other I/Os – CAN FD, I2C, SPI, UART, GPIO
- Security
  - ARM TrustZone security extension
  - Secure boot / key ladder / OTP
  - Cipher engine (RSA, ECC, HASH, DES, AES, SHA, SM)
- Package – 16x17mm, 0.65pitch, FCCSP package

The RK3588 succeeds the RK3399Pro as flagship SoC. It was expected to be available in Q3/Q4 2020.

- CPU – 4 × Cortex-A76 and 4 × Cortex-A55 cores in dynamIQ configuration
- GPU – ARM Mali-G610 MP4 GPU
- NPU (Neural Processing Unit) - 6 TOPS
- Multimedia – 8K video decoding support, 4K encoding support
- Display – 4K video output, dual-display support
- Process – 8 nm LP

RK3588-based SBC example is Boardcon Idea3588, and SOM example is CM3588 SOM.

=== RK36xx series ===
Upcoming RK3668 announced by The Rockchip Developer Conference 2025 (RKDC!2025), with preliminary specifications:

- CPU – 4x Cortex-A730 + 4x Cortex-A530 cores delivering ~200K DMIPS
- GPU – ARM Magni GPU delivering 1-1.5 TFLOPS
- AI accelerator – 16 TOPS RKNN-P3 NPU
- VPU – 8K 60 FPS video decoder
- ISP – AI-enhanced ISP supporting up to 8K at 30 FPS
- Memory – LPDDR5/LPDDR5x/LPDDR6 up to 100 GB/s
- Storage – UFS 4.0
- Video Output – HDMI 2.1 up to 8K 60 FPS, MIPI DSI
- Peripherals interfaces – PCIe, UCIe
- Process – 5~6 nm

Alongside RK3688 is RK3588 successor as new flagship SoC with preliminary specifications:

- CPU – 8x Cortex-A730 + 4x Cortex-A530 cores delivering >300K DMIPS
- GPU – ARM Magni GPU delivering >2 TFLOPS
- AI accelerator – 32 TOPS RKNN-P3 NPU
- VPU – 16K 30 FPS video decoder, 8K 60 FPS video encoder
- ISP – AI-enhanced ISP supporting up to 8K at 60 FPS
- Memory – LPDDR5/LPDDR5x/LPDDR6 up to 200 GB/s
- Storage – UFS 4.0
- Video Output – HDMI, MIPI DSI
- Peripherals interfaces – PCIe, UCIe
- Process – 4~5 nm

== Open-source commitment ==
Rockchip provides open source software on GitHub and maintains a wiki Linux SDK website to offer free downloads of SoC hardware documents and software development resources as well as third-party development kit info.

On December 18, 2025, FFmpeg filed a Digital Millennium Copyright Act (DMCA) takedown request at GitHub against Rockchip for copying thousands of lines of code from FFmpeg's libavcodec in its Media Process Platform video acceleration libraries and applying another license over the code. GitHub disabled the repository. FFmpeg allege they were ignored for two years.

== Markets and competition ==
In the market for SoCs for tablets, Rockchip faces competition with Allwinner Technology, MediaTek, Intel, Actions Semiconductor, Spreadtrum, Leadcore Technology, Samsung Semiconductor, Qualcomm, Broadcom, VIA Technologies and Amlogic.

After establishing a position early in the developing Chinese tablet SoC market, in 2012 it faced a challenge by Allwinner. In 2012, Rockchip shipped 10.5 million tablet processors, compared to 27.5 million for Allwinner. However, for Q3 2013, Rockchip was forecast to ship 6 million tablet-use application processors in China, compared to 7 million for Allwinner, who mainly shipped single-core products. Rockchip was reported to be the number one supplier of tablet-use application processors in China in Q4 2013, Q1 2014 and Q2 2014.

Chinese SoC suppliers that do not have cellular baseband technology are at a disadvantage compared to companies such as MediaTek that also supply the smartphone market as white-box tablet makers increasingly add phone or cellular data functionality to their products.

Intel Corporation made investments into the tablet processor market, and was heavily subsidizing its entry into the low-cost tablet market as of 2014.

=== Cooperation with Intel ===
In May 2014, Intel announced an agreement with Rockchip to jointly deliver an Intel-branded mobile SoC platform based on Intel's Atom processor and 3G modem technology. Under the terms of the agreement, the two companies will deliver an Intel-branded mobile SoC platform. The quad-core platform will be based on an Intel Atom processor core integrated with Intel's 3G modem technology, and is expected to be available in the first half of 2015. Both Intel and Rockchip will sell the new part to OEMs and ODMs, primarily into each company's existing customer base.

As of October 2014, Rockchip was already offering Intel's XMM 6321, for low-end smartphones. It has two chips, a dual-core application processor (either with Intel processor cores or ARM Cortex-A5 cores) with integrated modem (XG632), and an integrated RF chip (AG620) that originates from the cellular chip division of Infineon Technologies (which Intel acquired some time ago). The application processor may also originate from Infineon or Intel.

== List of Rockchip SoCs ==
=== ARMv7-A processors ===
Model Number	Fab	CPU					GPU			Memory Technology			Sampl. Avail- ability	Utilizing Devices
Model Number	Fab	ISA	μarch	Cores	Freq. (GHz)	L2 cache (KB)	μarch	Freq. (MHz)	GFlops	Type	Bus width	BW (GB/s)	Sampl. Avail- ability	Utilizing Devices
RK2918	55 nm	ARMv7-A	ARM Cortex-A8	1	1 – 1.2	512	Vivante GC800	575	4.6	DDR, DDR2, DDR3	?	?	2011	List: Cube U9GT2, CUBE U15GT, Teclast A15, Wopad i8, Orange TB9900, list of Jelly Bean upgradeable RK2918 tablets Videocon VT71, Innovel I703W, Odys Neo X7 / X8, Huawei MediaPad 7 Lite
RK2926	55 nm	ARMv7-A	ARM Cortex-A9	1	1.0	128	Mali-400 MP	400	3.6	?	32-bit	?	?	List: Avoca 7" Tablet STB7012
RK2928	55 nm	ARMv7-A	ARM Cortex-A9	1	1.0	?	Mali-400 MP	400	3.6	DDR3, DDR3L	32-bit	?	2012	List: Cube U25GT, Double Power(Dopo) M-975, Touchmate TM-MID720, Denver TAC-70072
RK3066	40 nm	ARMv7-A	ARM Cortex-A9	2	1.6	512	Mali-400 MP4	266	9.6	LPDDR-400, LPDDR2-800, DDR3-800, LVDDR3-800, up to 2 GiB	32-bit	3.2	2012	List: Boardcon MINI3066, Monster M7 tablet, HP Slate 7, Inar إينار, i.onik TP 10.1-1500DC-KB, Colorovo CityTab Vision 10.1", Teclast P76e Dual-core, Teclast P76t, Teclast P98, Teclast P85, Window (YuanDao) N70S, Window (YuanDao) N101 I, Cube U9GT3, Cube U9GT4, Cube U21GT, PIPO S2, Cube U30GT, Cube U9GT V, Cube U18GT Elite Dual Core, BlueBerry NetCat M-12, CHUWI V8 Dual-core, CHUWI V99, Aoson M11, Pipo S1, Ployer Momo7 IPS, Ployer Momo8, Ployer Momo11, Ployer Momo12, FNF ifive X, FNF ifive mini, Prestigio 7.0 Pro Duo (5570C), Probox2 Ultimate, Minix Neo G4, Minix Neo X5, Minix Neo X5 mini, Minix Neo X3, ICOO D70PROII, Ampe A78, Imito MX1, Imito MX2, Rikomagic MK802 III, Rikomagic MK802 IIIs, Tronsmart MK808, Tronsmart MK808B, JMI Tab T970, Joyplus DR-7, Cozyswan MK809, Cozyswan MK809 II, Ugoos UG802, Ugoos UG802II, Ugoos UG007, Ugoos UG008, Measy U2A, Measy U2C, iball Slide i9702, Kilwa V73, Tomato V8, Innovel I801B, DNS AirTab M76r, Danew Dslide972, Noblex NB8012, (Nexoc) Captiva Pad 10.1, Hisense Sero 7 LT, teXet TM-7047HD, teXet TM-9747, teXet TM-9747BT, teXet TM-9748
RK3026	40 nm	ARMv7-A	ARM Cortex-A9	2	1.0	?	Mali-400 MP2	500	9.0	DDR3, DDR3L	32-bit	?	Q3 2013	List: Blow WhiteTAB 7.2 Multimedia tablet, Odys Bravio
RK3036	40 nm	ARMv7-A	ARM Cortex-A7	2	1.0	?	Mali-400 MP	500	9.0	DDR3-1066, DDR3L-1066	16-bit	?	Q4 2014	
RK3126	40 nm	ARMv7-A	ARM Cortex-A7	4	1.2	256	Mali-400 MP2	600	10.8	DDR3-1066, DDR3L-1066	16-bit	?	Q4 2014	
RK3128	40 nm	ARMv7-A	ARM Cortex-A7	4	1.2	256	Mali-400 MP2	600	10.8	DDR3-1066, DDR3L-1066, LPDDR2-1066	32-bit	?	Q4 2014	List: Boardcon Compact3128
RK3168	28 nm HKMG	ARMv7-A	ARM Cortex-A9	2	1.2	256	PowerVR SGX540	600	9.6	DDR3-1066, DDR3L-1066, LPDDR2-1066	32-bit	?	2013	List: RCA RCT6378W2, Toshiba Excite 7cJazz UltraTab C855
RK3188	28 nm HKMG	ARMv7-A	ARM Cortex-A9	4	1.6	512	Mali-400 MP4	533	19.2	Up to 800 MHz LPDDR2, DDR3/3L, up to 2 GiB	32-bit	6.4	2013	List: Boardcon EM3188 SBC, Asus MemoPad 8, Asus MemoPad 10, Toshiba Excite 7, Minix Neo X7/Neo X7 mini, GoTab GTQ97, Cube Pea II, Cube U30GT2, CloudnetGo CR9, iMito QX1, PIPO M8pro, PIPO M9, PIPO M7 PRO, Rikomagic MK802 IV, Ugoos UG802B, Ugoos UG007B, Ugoos MK809 III, Ugoos QC802, Measy U4B, Tronsmart MK908, Tronsmart T428, Measy U4B, Freelander PD800, FNF iFive x2 Vido Mini One, JXD S7800b, Tesco Hudl, SteelCore10III, teXet TM-9750HD, teXet TM-9757, teXet TM-9758, teXet TM-9767, teXet TM-9768H, Radxa Rock, Loosen RAM use Greenify, GoClever ORION 100, Medion LifeTab S7852,
RK3188T	28 nm HKMG	ARMv7-A	ARM Cortex-A9	4	1.4	512	Mali-400 MP4	+-400	14.4	Up to 800 MHz LPDDR2, DDR3/3L, up to 2 GiB	32-bit	?	2013	
RK3229	28 nm HKMG	ARMv7-A	ARM Cortex-A7	4	1.5	256	Mali-400 MP2	600	10.8	LPDDR2/3, DDR3/3L, up to 2 GiB				
RK3288	28 nm HKMG	ARMv7-A	ARM Cortex-A17	4	1.8	1024	Mali-T760 MP4	600	67.2	DDR3/3L-1333, LPDDR2/3-1066, up to 4 GiB	32-bit dual channel	?	Q3 2014	List: Boardcon EM3288 SBC, Pipo P1, Pipo P8, Teclast P90HD, Tronsmart Orion R28, FNF iFive Mini 4 Insignia - Flex Elite 7.85", Asus Chromebook C201, Chromebit CS10 and Chromebook Flip C100P, Lenovo MiniStation, Asus Tinkerboard
RK3506 RK3506B RK3506G2 RK3506J	?	ARMv7-A	ARM Cortex-A7	3	1.2 (RK3506G2) 1.5 (RK3506B) 1.6 (RK3506J)	128	2D GPU	?	?	DDR2, DDR3, DDR3L	16-bit	?	Q4 2023	

=== ARMv8-A processors ===
Model Number	Fab	CPU					GPU			Memory Technology			Sampl. Avail- ability	Utilizing Devices
Model Number	Fab	ISA	μarch	Cores	Freq. (GHz)	L2 cache (KB)	μarch	Freq. (MHz)	GFlops	Type	Bus width	BW (GB/s)	Sampl. Avail- ability	Utilizing Devices
RK1808	?	ARMv8‑A	ARM Cortex-A35	2	1.6	?	-	-	-	2 MB SRAM; LPDDR2, DDR3, DDR3L, LPDDR3, DDR4	32-bit	?	?	?
RK3308	?	ARMv8‑A	ARM Cortex-A35	4	1.3	?	-	-	-	LPDDR2, DDR3, DDR3L, LPDDR3	16-bit	?	?	?
RK3326; PX30	40 nm	ARMv8‑A	ARM Cortex-A35	4	1.5	256	Mali-G31MP2	520 (RK3326); 480 (PX30)	?	LPDDR2, DDR3, DDR3L, LPDDR3, DDR4	32-bit	6.4	2018	List: REV Robotics Driver Hub
RK3328	28 nm HKMG	ARMv8‑A	ARM Cortex-A53	4	1.5	256	Mali-450MP4 (Note: Rockchip's product page lists the GPU as the Mali-450MP2, but the actual datasheet lists it as a quad-core GPU, and the Rockchip wiki backs that up, listing it as the Mali-450MP4.)	500	?	DDR3, DDR3L, LPDDR3, DDR4	32-bit	?	Q1 2017	List: ROCK64; ROC-RK3328-CC; REV Robotics Control Hub
RK3368; PX5	28 nm HKMG	ARMv8‑A	ARM Cortex-A53 (big.LITTLE)	4+4	1.5	512 (Big cluster); 256 (Little cluster)	PowerVR G6110	600	38.4	LPDDR2, DDR3, DDR3L, LPDDR3	32-bit	?	Q1 2015	List: Tronsmart Orion R68; GeekBox
RK3399; RK3399Pro; PX6	28 nm HKMG	ARMv8‑A	ARM Cortex-A72 & ARM Cortex-A53 (big.LITTLE with GTS)	2+4	2.0 (A72); 1.5 (A53)	1024 (A72); 512 (A53)	Mali-T860 MP4	600	67.2	LPDDR2, DDR3, DDR3L, LPDDR3, LPDDR4	2 channels, each 16-bit or 32-bit, up to 4 GB	?	Q2 2016	List: iFive 2-in-1, Techvision 2-in-1, FenMi TV box, Boardcon EM3399 SBC, Ugoos UT5 TV box, Samsung Chromebook Plus OP1, PiPo V5 Android VR Headset
RK3518	?	ARMv8‑A	ARM Cortex-A53	4	1.4	64	Mali-450	?	?	DDR3, DDR3L, LPDDR3, DDR4, LPDDR4, LPDDR4X	32-bit	?	?	
RK3528; RK3528A	?	ARMv8‑A	ARM Cortex-A53	4	2.0	128 x4	Mali-450	?	?	DDR3, DDR3L, LPDDR3, DDR4, LPDDR4, LPDDR4X	32-bit	9.6	?	
RK3562	?	ARMv8‑A	ARM Cortex-A53	4	2.0	128 x4	Mali-G52 2EE MC1	?	?	DDR3, DDR3L, LPDDR3, DDR4, LPDDR4, LPDDR4X	32-bit	10.6	?	
RK3566	22 nm	ARMv8.2‑A	ARM Cortex-A55	4	1.8	128 x4	Mali-G52 2EE MC1	800	38.4	DDR3, DDR3L, LPDDR3, DDR4, LPDDR4, LPDDR4X	32-bit	?	Q2 2020	
RK3568; RK3568J	22 nm	ARMv8.2‑A	ARM Cortex-A55	4	2.0	128 x4	Mali-G52 2EE MC1	800	38.4	DDR3, DDR3L, LPDDR3, DDR4, DDR4 with ECC, LPDDR4, LPDDR4X	32-bit	?	Q2 2020	
RK3576; RK3576J	8 nm LP	ARMv8‑A	ARM Cortex-A72 & ARM Cortex-A53	4+4	2.2 (A72); 1.8 (A53)	1024 (A72); 512 (A53)	Mali-G52 MC3	1000	144	LPDDR4, LPDDR4x, LPDDR5	32-bit	19.2	Q4 2023	List: Banana Pi BPI-M5 Pro
RK3582	8 nm LP	ARMv8.2‑A	ARM Cortex-A76 & ARM Cortex-A55	2+4	2.6 (A76); 1.8 (A55)	512 x2 (A76); 128 x4 (A55)	—N/a			LPDDR4, LPDDR4x, LPDDR5	64-bit	?	?	
RK3588; RK3588S; RK3588S2; RK3588C	8 nm LP	ARMv8.2‑A	ARM Cortex-A76 & ARM Cortex-A55	4+4	2.6 (A76); 1.8 (A55)	512 x4 (A76); 128 x4 (A55)	Mali-G610 MP4	1000	512	LPDDR4, LPDDR4x, LPDDR5	64-bit	?	Q3/Q4 2020	

=== Tablet processors with integrated modem ===
Model number	Fab	CPU					GPU			Memory technology			Integrated wireless technology	Sampl. avail-ability	Utilizing devices
Model number	Fab	ISA	μarch	Cores	Freq. (GHz)	L2 cache (KB)	μarch	Freq. (MHz)	GFlops	Type	Bus width	BW (GB/s)	Integrated wireless technology	Sampl. avail-ability	Utilizing devices
x3-C3130	28 nm	x86-64	Intel Atom SoFIA 3G	2	1.0	512	Mali-400 MP2	480	8.64	1x 32-bit LPDDR2 800, up to 1 GB	32-bit	3.2	HSPA+ 21/5.8, GSM/GPRS/EDGE, DSDS, Wi-Fi, BT 4.0 LE, GPS, GLONASS, FM	Q1'15	
x3-C3200RK	28 nm	x86-64	Intel Atom SoFIA 3G-R	4	1.1	1024	Mali-450 MP4	600	35.8	1x 32-bit LPDDR2/3 1066, 2x 16-bit DDR3L 1333, up to 2 GB	32-bit	4.2	Wi-Fi	Q1'15	
x3-C3205RK	28 nm	x86-64	Intel Atom SoFIA 3G-R	4	1.2	1024	Mali-450 MP4	600	35.8	1x 32-bit LPDDR2/3 1066, 2x 16-bit DDR3L 1333, up to 2 GB	32-bit	4.2	Wi-Fi	Q4'16	
x3-C3230RK	28 nm	x86-64	Intel Atom SoFIA 3G-R	4	1.1	1024	Mali-450 MP4	600	35.8	1x 32-bit LPDDR2/3 1066, 2x 16-bit DDR3L 1333, up to 2 GB	32-bit	4.2	HSPA+ 21/5.8, GSM/GPRS/EDGE, DSDS, Wi-Fi, BT 4.0 LE, GPS, GLONASS, FM	Q'15	
x3-C3235RK	28 nm	x86-64	Intel Atom SoFIA 3G-R	4	1.2	1024	Mali-450 MP4	600	35.8	1x 32-bit LPDDR2/3 1066, 2x 16-bit DDR3L 1333, up to 2 GB	32-bit	4.2	HSPA+ 21/5.8, GSM/GPRS/EDGE, DSDS, Wi-Fi, BT 4.0 LE, GPS, GLONASS, FM	Q4'15	
x3-C3265RK	28 nm	x86-64	Intel Atom SoFIA 3G-R	4	1.1	1024	Mali-450 MP4	600	35.8	1x 32-bit LPDDR2/3 1066, 2x 16-bit DDR3L 1333, up to 2 GB	32-bit	4.2	HSPA+ 21/5.8, GSM/GPRS/EDGE, DSDS, Wi-Fi, BT 4.0 LE, GPS, GLONASS, FM	Q4'16	
x3-C3295RK	28 nm	x86-64	Intel Atom SoFIA 3G-R	4	1.1	1024	Mali-450 MP4	600	35.8	1x 32-bit LPDDR2/3 1066, 2x 16-bit DDR3L 1333, up to 2 GB	32-bit	4.2	HSPA+ 21/5.8, GSM/GPRS/EDGE, DSDS, Wi-Fi, BT 4.0 LE, GPS, GLONASS, FM	Q4'16	
x3-C3440	28 nm	x86-64	Intel Atom SoFIA LTE	4	1.4	1024	Mali-T720 MP2	600	24	1 × LPDDR2/3 1066, 2 × 16-bit DDR3/DDR3L 1066	32-bit	4.2	LTE FDD/TDD up to Cat 6, DC-HSPA+ 42/11, TD-SCDMA, GSM/GPRS/EDGE, DSDS, Wi-Fi, BT 4.1 LE, GPS, GLONASS, Beidou, FM, NFC	Q1'15	
x3-C3405	28 nm	x86-64	Intel Atom SoFIA LTE	4	1.4	1024	Mali-T720 MP2	456	18.2	1 × LPDDR2/3 1066	32-bit	4.2	Wi-Fi	Q1'15	
x3-C3445	28 nm	x86-64	Intel Atom SoFIA LTE	4	1.4	1024	Mali-T720 MP2	456	18.2	1 × LPDDR2/3 1066	32-bit	4.2	LTE FDD/TDD up to Cat 6, DC-HSPA+ 42/11, TD-SCDMA, GSM/GPRS/EDGE, DSDS, Wi-Fi, BT 4.1 LE, GPS, GLONASS, Beidou, FM, NFC	Q1'15	

== See also ==
- List of Rockchip products
- List of Qualcomm Snapdragon processors
- Samsung Exynos
- Rockchip RK3288
- Chromebook
- List of applications of ARM cores
- ARM Cortex-A53
- Allwinner Technology
- Amlogic
- Actions Semiconductor
- Leadcore Technology
- MediaTek
- Nufront
- Spreadtrum
