= Asus Tinker Board =

Single-board computer by Asus

ASUS Tinker Board
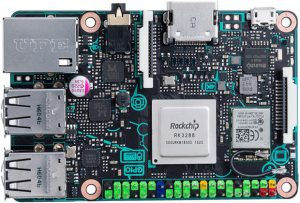
- Type: 90MB0QY1-M0EAY0
- Released: April 19, 2017
- Introductory price: c. US$59.99
- Operating system: TinkerOS (a Debian Linux derivative), Armbian (Debian or Ubuntu derivative), Android
- System on a chip: Rockchip RK3288
- CPU: 1.8 GHz 32-bit quad-core ARM Cortex-A17
- Memory: 2 GB dual-channel DDR3
- Storage: MicroSDHC UHS-1 slot
- Graphics: ARM Mali-T760 M4 GPU – supports 1080p & 4K
- Website: ASUS specifications page

The Asus Tinker Board is a single-board computer launched by Asus in early 2017. Its physical size and GPIO pinout are designed to be compatible with the second and third-generation Raspberry Pi models. The first released board features 4K video, 2 GB of onboard RAM, Gigabit Ethernet and a Rockchip RK3288 processor running at 1.8 GHz.

== Specifications ==
Model	Tinker Board	Tinker Board S	Tinker Board R2.0	Tinker Board S R2.0	Tinker Edge T	Tinker Edge R	Tinker Board 2	Tinker Board 2S	Tinker Board 3	Tinker Board 3N
Release date	April 2017	January 2018	October 2021		November 2019		November 2020			August 2023
SoC	Rockchip RK3288		Rockchip RK3288-CG.W		NXP i.MX 8M	Rockchip RK3399Pro	OP1 (Rockchip RK3399)		Rockchip RK3566	Rockchip RK3568
Architecture	ARMv7-A (32-bit)				ARMv8 (64-bit)					
CPU	Quad-core 1.8 GHz ARM Cortex-A17 (up to 2.6 GHz turbo clock speed)		Quad-Core		Quad core 1.5 GHz ARM Cortex-A53	Hexa core. 2× Cortex-A72 cores up to 1.8 GHz, 4× Cortex-A53 cores @ 1.4 GHz	Hexa core. 2x Cortex-A72 cores up to 2 GHz, 4× Cortex-A53 cores @ 1.5 GHz		Quad core 4× Cortex-A55	
GPU	600 MHz Mali-T764 MP4				GC7000 Lite 3D	800 MHz Mali-T860 MP4			Mali G52	
Coprocessor	N/A				Google Edge TPU 4 TOPS of performance	NPU 3 TOPS of performance	N/A		RockchipNPU	N/A
RAM	2GB dual channel LPDDR3				1 GB LPDDR4	4 GB dual channel LPDDR4 for system, 2 GB LPDDR3 for NPU	2GB/4GB dual-channel LPDDR4 RAM options		Dual-channelLPDDR4X 2GB / 4GB	2GB/4GB/8 GB dual-channel LPDDR4 RAM options
Storage	removable MicroSD slot (supporting SD 3.0 )	16GB eMMC + removable MicroSD slot (supporting SD 3.0)	Micro SD(TF) slot	16/32 eMMC + Micro SD(TF) slot	8GB eMMC	16GB eMMC + removable MicroSD slot (supporting SD 3.0)	Removable MicroSD slot	16GB eMMC + removable MicroSD slot	Micro SD (TF) card slot (push/pull)	eMMC - none / 32GB / 64GB Micro SD(TF) card slot (push/pull) SPI Flash 16MB
Video output	1× full size HDMI 1.4; 1× MIPI-DSI (compatible with the Raspberry Pi 7" display and others)						1× HDMI 2.0 (4K-capable); 1× MIPI-DSI (4 lane); 1× DisplayPort 1.2 via USB Type-C		1 x HDMI, supports up to 4096 x 2160 @ 60 Hz 1 x MIPI DSI, Supports four lanes up to 6 Gbps, 1920 x1080 @ 60 Hz (22 pin)	1× HDMI with CEC hardware ready 1× LVDS (Dual-link); 1× eDP
Video input	1× 15-pin MIPI-CSI camera				2× MIPI-CSI camera		1× MIPI CSI-2 (2 lane) camera			
Audio	RTL ALC4040 HD CODEC, Play: 24bit/192 kHz, Record: 24bit/96 kHz; 3.5 mm audio jack (supporting line out and microphone in)	RTL ALC4040 HD CODEC, Play: 24bit/192 kHz, Record: 24bit/96 kHz 3.5 mm audio jack (supporting line out and microphone in, Plug-in Detection and Auto-Switch)	1× HDMI audio output; RTL ALC4030U CODEC with 1 x 3.5mm audio jack (with mic and plug-in detection); 1× S/PDIF TX pin; 1× PCM/I2S pins (from GPIO)			3.5 mm audio jack	1× HDMI audio output 1× S/PDIF TX pin (from GPIO); 1× PCM/I2S pins (from GPIO)		1 x 3.5 phone jack (with mic) 1 x HDMI audio	1 x 3.5 Phone Jack (w/ Mic) 1 x Speaker Stereo Pin Header (4ohm, 3W each) 1 x HDMI audio
Other IO	40-pin header with: up to 28× GPIO pins; up to 2× SPI bus; up to 2× I2C bus; up to 4× UART; up to 2× PWM; up to 1× PCM/I2S; 2× 5V power pins; 2× 3.3V power pins; 8× ground pins; 1× 2-pin contact pin: 1× PWM; 1× S/PDIF	40-pin header with: up to 28× GPIO pins; up to 2× SPI bus; up to 2× I2C bus; up to 4× UART; up to 2× PWM; up to 1× PCM/I2S (Enhanced I2S pin with Slave mode); 2× 5V power pins; 2× 3.3V power pins; 8× ground pins; 1 x 2-pin contact pin: 1× PWM; 1× S/PDIF; 1× 2-pin Power-on Header	40-pin header with: up to 28× GPIO pins; up to 2× SPI bus; up to 2× I2C bus; up to 4× UART; up to 2× PWM; up to 1× PCM/I2S; 2× 5V power pins; 2× 3.3V power pins; 8× ground pins; 1× 2-pin Power-on Header 1× 2-pin eMMC recovery header 1× 2-pin contact pin: 1× PWM; 1× S/PDIF		40-pin header with: up to 28× GPIO pins; up to 2× SPI bus; up to 2× I2C bus; up to 4× UART; up to 2× PWM; up to 1× PCM/I2S (Enhanced I2S pin with Slave mode); 2× 5V power pins; 2× 3.3V power pins; 8× ground pins	40-pin header with: up to 28× GPIO pins; up to 2× SPI bus; up to 2× I2C bus; up to 4× UART; up to 2× PWM; up to 1× PCM/I2S (Enhanced I2S pin with Slave mode); 2× 5V power pins; 2× 3.3V power pins; 8× ground pins; mPCIe Card & nanoSIM card slot for 4G/LTE	40-pin header with: up to 28× GPIO pins; up to 2× SPI bus; up to 2× I2C bus; up to 2× UART; up to 3× PWM; up to 1× S/PDIF TX; up to 1× PCM/I2S (Enhanced I2S pin with Slave mode); 2× 5V power pins; 2× 3.3V power pins; 8× ground pins; 1× 2-pin Recovery header 1× 2-pin Power-on header 1× 2-pin Reset header 1× 2-pin Debug UART header 1× 2-pin DC Fan header 1× 2-pin RTC Battery header		40-pin header with: up to 2 x SPI bus; up to 2 x I2C bus; up to 2 x UART; up to 3 x PWM; up to 1 x PCM/I2S(master/slave); up to 1 x S/PDIF TX; 2 x 5V power pins; 2 x 3.3V power pins; 8 x ground pins; 1 x 2-pin recovery header 1 x 2-pin power-on & reset header 1 x 3-pin debug UART header 1 x 2-pin DC fan header 1 x 2-pin RTC battery header 1 x MaskromDIP switch 1 x M.2 E key 2230 - for WiFi 5/6 & BT module (PCIe 2.0 x1, USB 2.0)	14-pin GPIO header with: 1 x GND; 1 x I2C bus; 1 up to 2 x UART; up to 1 x SPI bus (2 select); up to 1 x SPDIF; up to 4 x PWM; 2 x ADC (8 bit); 1 x 40-pin LVDS + eDP connector 1 x 5V Panel Backlight & Control header 1 x IR Receiver header 1 x 2-pin Recovery header 1 x 4-pin Power-on & Reset header 1 x 3-pin Debug UART header 1 x 4-pin DC Fan header 1 x 2-pin RTC Battery header 1x CAN Bus 2.0B FD pin header 2x COM 232 (with flow control) pin header 1x COM 232/422/485 pin header 1x SIM Slot 1 x M.2 E key 2230 - for WiFi 5/6 & BT module (PCIe 2.0 x1, USB 2.0) 1 x M.2 B key 3042/3052 with nano-SIM slot - 4G/5G or SSD module (PCIe 3.0 x1, USB 3.0, USB 2.0, SIM)
USB	4× USB 2.0 ports				2× USB 3.0, 1x USB-C	3× USB 3.0 ports, 1x USB-C	3× USB 3.2 Gen1 Type A ports 1× USB 3.2 Gen1 Type C (OTG & DisplayPort 1.2)		1 x USB 3.2 Gen1 Type A 2 x USB 2.0 Type A ports 2 x USB 2.0 Micro B, device only 1 x USB 2.0 4-pin header	1× USB 3.2 Gen1 Type-C OTG port 2× USB 3.2 Gen1 Type-A ports 2× USB 2.0 Pin header
Wired; Network	Gigabit LAN (not shared with USB bus)									Dual LAN built in, and PoE PD supported via expansion module
Wireless; Network	802.11 b/g/n Wi-Fi, with IPEX antenna header				802.11 b/g/n/ac Wi-Fi	802.11 b/g/n/ac Wi-Fi	Wi-Fi 5 (802.11ac dual-band Wi-Fi) on module		Via mM2 E key expansion	
Bluetooth	Bluetooth 4.0 + EDR		Blutetooth 4.2 + EDR		Bluetooth 4.1	Bluetooth 4.2	Bluetooth 5.0		Via mM2 E key expansion	
Power	Micro-USB; due to Micro-USB power delivery limitations, powering over GPIO is suggested		5V/2.5~3A Micro USB (supports low power voltage detection)		12V - 19V DC-in barrel connector				12-19V via DC barrel power input jack (5.5/2.5 mm)	12-19V via DC barrel power input jack (5.5/2.5 mm) 1 x 4-Pin Power In Header (also for POE module)
Form Factor	8.55 cm x 5.4 cm (3.37 x 2.125 inch)								85 × 56 mm (3.37 x 2.125 inch )	10.16 cm × 10.16 cm (4.0 x 4.0 inch) NUC
Weight	55g									
Operating Systems	TinkerOS (a Debian Linux derivative); Android 6; Android 7; Armbian; LibreELEC 9; Ubuntu Variants; Fedora 30; DietPi		Debian 10 Linux; Android 11				Debian 9 Linux; Android 10		Debian; Android; Yocto	Debian 11; Android 12
Notes	Specification sourced from Asus		Specification sourced from Asus				Specification sourced from Asus			

== History ==
ASUS's intent to release a single-board computer was leaked shortly after CES 2017 on SlideShare. ASUS originally planned for a late February 2017 release, but a UK vendor broke the embargo and began advertising and selling boards starting on 13 February 2017, before ASUS's marketing department was ready. ASUS subsequently pulled the release; the Amazon sales page was changed to show a 13 March 2017 release date, but was later removed entirely. However, as of 24 March 2017, the Tinker Board again became available on Amazon. ASUS assured reviewer websites that the board is now in full production.

== Benchmarks ==
In January 2017 tests showed the Tinker Board has roughly twice the processing power of the Raspberry Pi Model 3 when the Pi 3 runs in 32-bit mode. Because the Pi 3 has not released a 64-bit operating system yet, no comparisons are available against a Pi 3 running in 64-bit mode.

In March 2017 benchmark testing found that while the WLAN performance is only around 30 Mbit/s, the Gigabit Ethernet delivers a full 950 Mbit/s throughput. RAM access tested using the mbw benchmark is 25% faster than the Raspberry Pi 3. SD card (microSD) access is about twice as fast at 37 MiB/s for buffered reads (compared to typically around 18 MiB/s for the Pi 3) due to the Tinker Board's SDIO 3.0 interface, while cached reads can reach speeds up to 770 MiB/s.
