= Rockchip RK3288 =

Processor by Rockchip

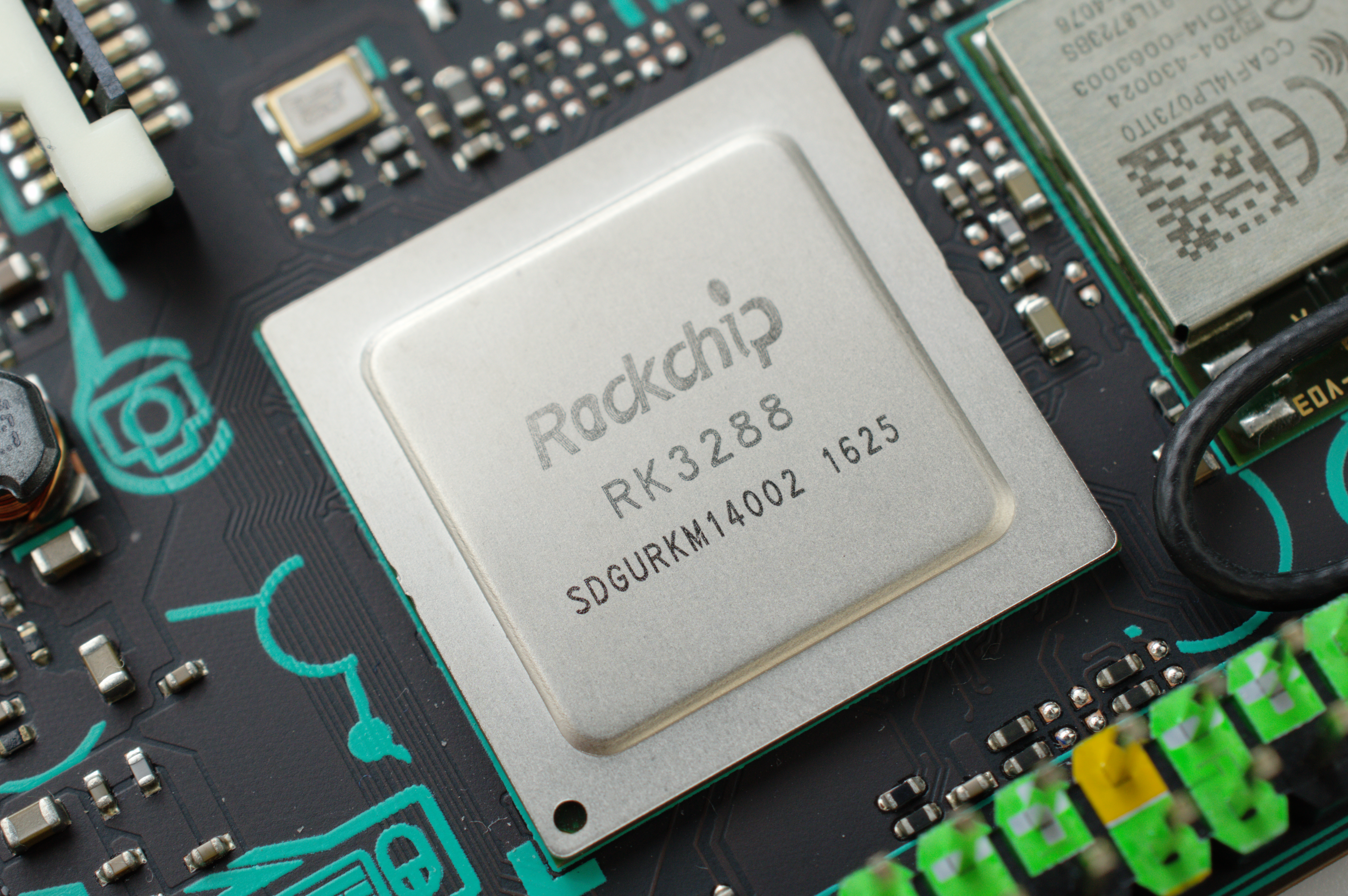
An RK3288 installed on an Asus Tinker Board.

The Rockchip RK3288 is an ARM architecture System on Chip (SoC) from Rockchip. It is the first SoC, in August 2014, that uses the 32-bit ARM Cortex-A17 processor. It is a quad-core processor with a NEON coprocessor and hardware acceleration for video and 3D graphics. It is used in a number of Chromebooks and other low-power, low-performance devices.

== Specifications ==
- 28 nm HKMG process.
- Quad-core ARM Cortex-A17, up to 1.8 GHz
- Quad-core ARM Mali-T760 MP4 GPU clocked at 650 MHz supporting OpenGL ES 1.1/2.0/3.0/3.1, OpenCL 1.1, Renderscript and Direct3D 11.1
- High performance dedicated 2D processor
- 1080P video encoding for H.264 and VP8, MVC
- 4K H.264 and 10bits H.265 video decode, 1080P multi video decode
- Supports 4Kx2K H.265 resolution
- Dual-channel 64-bit DRAM controller supporting DDR3, DDR3L, LPDDR2 and LPDDR3
- Up to 3840x2160 display output, HDMI 2.0
- Support dual-channel LVDS/dual-channel MIPI-DSI/eDP1.1
- HW Security system, support HDCP 2.X
- Embedded 13M ISP and MIPI-CSI2 interface

== Related products ==
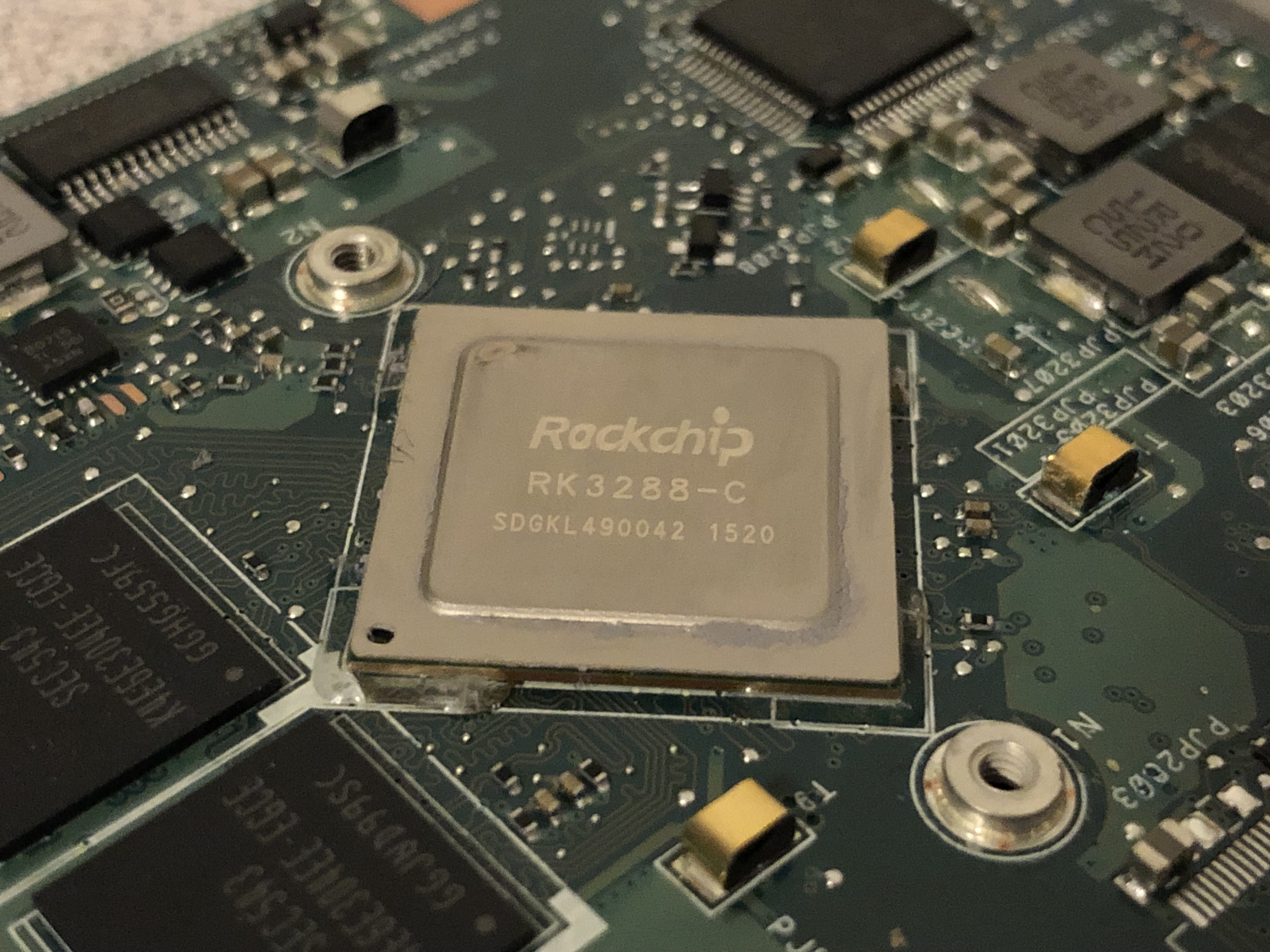
An RK3288-C used on an Asus C201 Chromebook.

The RK3288-C is used in the "Veyron" board design of several Chromebooks, and powers all of the following devices:

- GPD - GPD XD (handheld console)
- Hisense Chromebook 11
- Haier Chromebook 11 (and "edu" variant)
- AKAI MPC & FORCE
- DENON DJ SC, Live & Prime Units
- AOPEN Chromebox Mini ME4100
- ASUS C201 Chromebook
- ASUS Chromebook Flip C100
- ASUS Chromebook Flip C100P
- ASUS Chromebook Flip C100PA
- ASUS Chromebit
- ASUS Tinker Board and ASUS Tinker Board S
- Boardcon EM3288 SBC, MINI3288 module
- Radxa Rock 2 - System on Module type single board computer based on RK3288
- Lenovo miniStation (game console)
- Rikomagik MK902II (Android), MK902II LE (Linux) (netbox)
- Rikomagik MK802 V5 (Android), MK802 V5 LE (Linux) (Stick PC)
- AtGames Legends Ultimate Arcade Cabinet
- Mqmaker - MiQi SBC (Linux, Android)
- Headrush MX5, Prime (guitar multi-FX unit)
- Mettler Toledo bTouch (scale)
- FNF iFive Mini 4S
