= Android Mini PC MK802 =

PC-on-a-stick by Rikomagic

The MK802 is a PC-on-a-stick produced by Rikomagic, a Chinese company using mostly two series of systems on a chip architectures:

- AllWinner A1X SoC, based on an ARM architecture, composed of an ARMv7-based Cortex-A8 1 GHz processor, a Mali-400 MP GPU, Wi-Fi 802.11 b/g/n, and a VPU CedarX capable of displaying up to 1080p video.
- Rockchip RK3xxx SoC, based on an ARM architecture, composed of an ARMv7-based (Cortex-A8, Cortex-A9 and then, Cortex-A17 CPU for Rikomagic Mini PC MK902 series) beside Mali-400 (and Mali-T764 for MK902).

== History and models ==
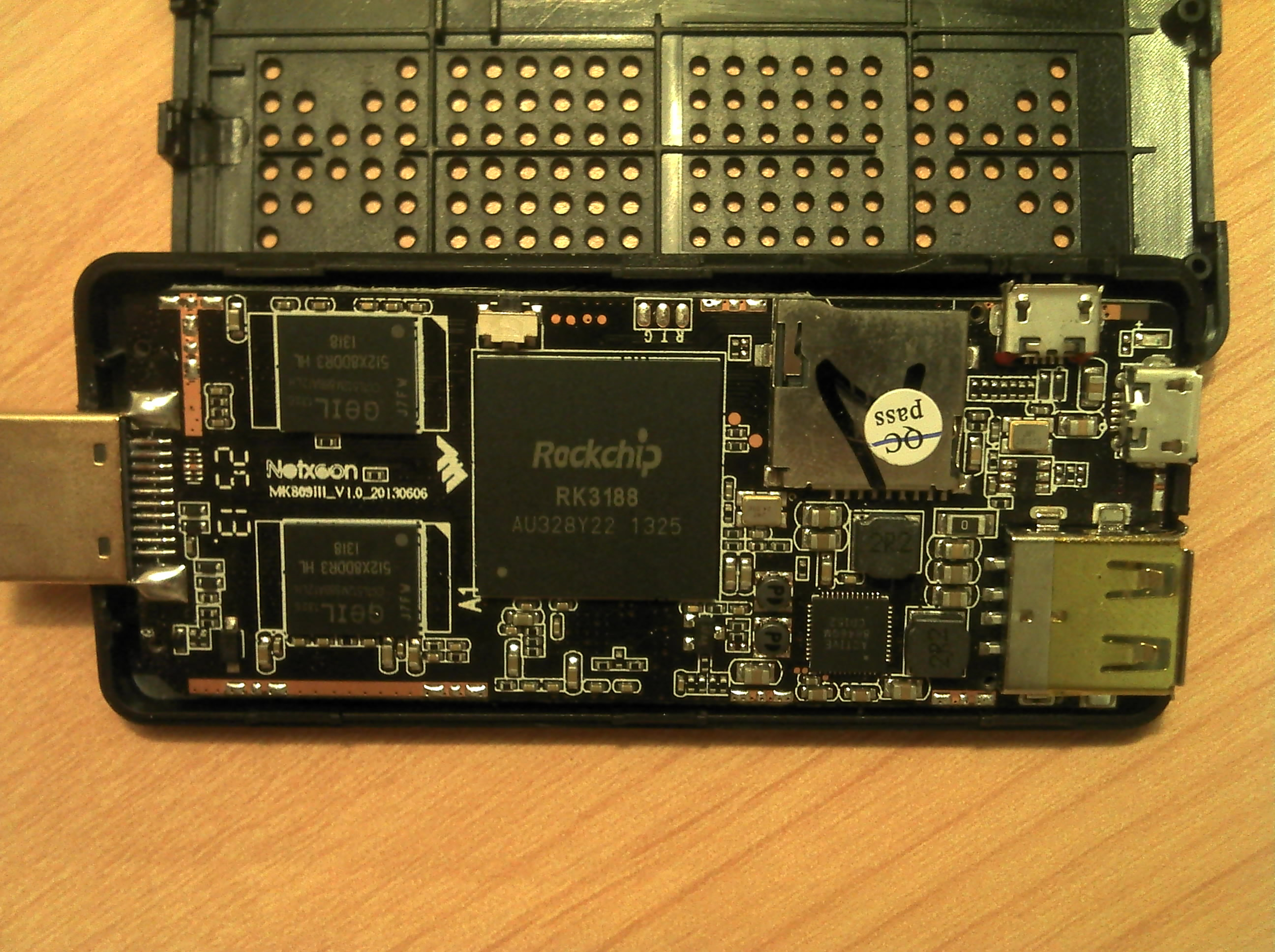
MK809 III V1.0 with Rockchip RK3188 ARMv7 SoC

The thumb sized MK802, which was first brought into market in May 2012, can turn a display with a HDMI or DVI-D port into an Android computer, or several Ubuntu derived Linux distribution for LE (Linux Edition) versions. Since the original design was introduced, five other similar models have been released.

- MK802: Original design with AllWinner A10 SoC (featuring single core ARM Cortex-A8 CPU and ARM Mali-400MP GPU).
- MK802+: Uses AllWinner A10s SoC with RAM increased to 1 GB
- MK802 II: Modified form and slightly increased processor speed
- MK802 III: A new design featuring a Rockchip RK3066 (including a dual-core ARM CPU (Cortex-A9 at 1.6 GHz and ARM Mali-400MP GPU), and 4 GB or 8 GB flash storage that runs Android 4.1.
- MK802 III LE: Picuntu (Xubuntu tweaked for Rockhip SoCs) distribution based vversion5.0.1f MK802 III; with 1 GB of RAM and 8 GB of flash storage.
- MK802 IIIs: Added Bluetooth support, soft power-off function and XBMC support.
- MK802 IV: Released in May 2013, a new design featuring a Rockchip RK3188/RK3188T, a quad-core ARM CPU (Cortex-A9 at 1.6 GHz, 1.4 GHz for the T model), 2 GB of RAM, 400 MHz Mali GPU and 8 GB of flash storage that runs Android 4.2.
- MK802 IV LE Ubuntu version of the MK802 IV with 2 GB of RAM, 8 and 16 GB flash storage versions.

== Connectors ==
- HDMI
- mini or micro USB 2.0
- USB 2.0
- microSD slot
- Power via micro-USB OTG

4G All models appear similar to a somewhat enlarged USB flash drive housing a processor, RAM, storage and I/O ports. Equipped with a keyboard, mouse and display, the device can perform the functions of an Android-based computer. Linux distributions Ubuntu or PicUntu can also be installed on these devices that offer a windowed desktop environment.

The MK802's success and design has generated a host of similar devices with similar specifications, many of which have similar model numbers, but are not manufactured by Rikomagic. Also, these devices share many characteristics with the Raspberry Pi computer.
