= Touchmate =

- Founded: 1988
- Area served: Worldwide (Mostly in UAE)
- Website: www.touchmate.net

Touchmate is a computer products manufacturing company founded in 1988 by "Vasant Menghani". One of the leading computer product manufacturing company in UAE, it was rated "Best IT Brand of UAE" by Reseller-Magazine in 2012. Ranging from products from tablets to smartphones.
