= RenderScript =

Android operating system API

- Developer: Google
- Operating system: Android (operating system)
- Website: developer.android.com/guide/topics/renderscript/compute

RenderScript is a deprecated component of the Android operating system for mobile devices that offers an API for acceleration that takes advantage of heterogeneous hardware. It allows developers to increase the performance of their applications at the cost of writing more complex (lower-level) code.

It provides the developer three primary tools: A simple 3D rendering API, a compute API similar to CUDA, and a C99-derived language.

== History ==
RenderScript was added in Android 3.0 Honeycomb.

As of Android 4.1, RenderScript's experimental 3D rendering API has been deprecated, and now exists solely as a compute API.

Android 4.2 added new capabilities to script intrinsics, such as Blend and Blur; as well as ScriptGroups which allows related RenderScript scripts to be grouped and executed with one call. It also added FilterScript, which is a subset of RenderScript that allows developers to write their image processing operations in FilterScript using the standard RenderScript runtime API, but within stricter constraints that ensure wider compatibility and improved optimization across multi-core CPUs, GPUs, and DSPs. FilterScript is less precise in floating point precision, and more cross device compatible subset of RenderScript – and should not be mistaken for a RenderScript replacement technology.

On April 19, 2021, Google announced that RenderScript will be deprecated in Android 12, and recommended porting existing code to Vulkan.

== Features ==
=== Portability ===
RenderScript is designed to always run on the various Android platforms regardless of hardware type. Performance tuning is done at runtime.

RenderScript portability depends upon device-specific drivers: a basic CPU-only driver is provided for every device, while there exist some specific chipset-provided RenderScript drivers that enable GPU usage (e.g. Qualcomm specific drivers, which are provided in the libRSDriver_adreno.so Android library).

=== Performance ===
RenderScript is designed to tune tasks at runtime that can be efficiently split and run concurrently on the underlying hardware.

As of Android 4.2, RenderScript has been expanded to run on the GPU in addition to the CPU on supported systems.

== Limitations ==
- RenderScript cannot yet express on-chip inter-thread communication (known as local memory in OpenCL, and shared memory in CUDA).
- RenderScript cannot yet express hardware-implemented 2D and 3D lookups with bilinear interpolation (known as texture in CUDA, and image read in OpenCL).
