= ARM Cortex-A12 =

32-bit multicore processor

General information
- Designed by: ARM Holdings

Physical specifications
- Cores: 1–4

Cache
- L1 cache: 32–64 KiB I, 32 KiB D
- L2 cache: 256 KiB–8 MiB (configurable with L2 cache controller)

Architecture and classification
- Instruction set: ARMv7-A

Products, models, variants
- Product code name: Owl

History
- Predecessor: ARM Cortex-A9
- Successor: ARM Cortex-A17

The ARM Cortex-A12 is a 32-bit processor core licensed by ARM Holdings implementing the ARMv7-A architecture. It provides up to 4 cache-coherent cores. The Cortex-A12 is a successor to the Cortex-A9.

ARM renamed A12 as a variant of Cortex-A17 since the second revision of the core in early 2014, because they were indistinguishable in performance.

== Overview ==
ARM claims that the Cortex-A12 core is 40 percent more powerful than the Cortex-A9 core. New features not found in the Cortex-A9 include hardware virtualization and 40-bit Large Physical Address Extensions (LPAE) addressing. It was announced as supporting big.LITTLE, however shortly afterwards the ARM Cortex-A17 was announced as the upgraded version with that capability.

Key features of the Cortex-A12 core are:

- Out-of-order speculative issue superscalar execution pipeline giving 3.00 DMIPS/MHz/core.
- NEON SIMD instruction set extension.
- High performance VFPv4 floating point unit.
- Thumb-2 instruction set encoding reduces the size of programs with little impact on performance.
- TrustZone security extensions.
- L2 cache controller (0-8 MB).
- Multi-core processing.
- 40-bit Large Physical Address Extensions (LPAE) addressing up to 1 TB of RAM.
- Hardware virtualization support.

== See also ==
- ARM architecture
- Comparison of ARMv8-A cores
- JTAG
- List of applications of ARM cores
- List of ARM cores
