= Hyundai Play X =

Android tablet

The Hyundai Play X is an Android tablet.

The device has a 2048×1536 resolution IPS screen with 3.14 million total pixels, pixel density (definition) reaches 264 ppi. The Hyundai Play X (X900) houses a dual core Rockchip RK3066 processor which is based on the 40 nm LP process of low-power and its frequency reaches 1.6 GHz. The quad-core graphics processor with 1GB of RAM with the help of POP special technology drives the retina screen.

== Description ==
It runs Android 4.1 and has two cameras: the front camera is 2.0 MP, the rear-facing one 5.0 MP. The 10-point multi-touch is used for video games. It is equipped with a Li-ion battery which can support eight hours working time.

Based on the original slim design style, it has a black surface panel with s a silver frame. The front part of the device is a 9.7-inch retina screen with a resolution of 2048×1536, 4:3 screen ratio. The tablet is thin, about 9.5 mm. For hardware performance the device is powered by Cortex A9 Dual Core RK3066 1.6 GHz CPU and GC-400 MP4 Quad Core GPU. It has 1 GB RAM and 16 GB ROM. The contrast ratio of the 9.7-inch retina screen is up to 800:1 and the brightness is 440 cd/m^{2}.
