= Google TV =

Google TV may refer to:

- Google TV (interface), an updated Android TV interface launched in 2020
  - Google TV Streamer, a streaming device powered by the interface
- Google TV (service), a digital distribution service succeeding Google Play Movies & TV
- Google TV (2010–2014), a discontinued operating system for smart TVs

== See also ==
- Chromecast with Google TV
- Android TV, the architecture behind the interface
- YouTube TV, a live-channel streaming service
- Fiber TV, a defunct TV service provider
