= Cooolbox =

Bulgarian telecommunications company

- Formerly: ITD Network (1997–2015)
- Company type: Joint-stock company
- Industry: telecommunications
- Founded: 1997
- Headquarters: Plovdiv, Bulgaria
- Area served: Sofia; Plovdiv; Veliko Tarnovo
- Key people: Ivo Teodorov Dimitrov (CEO)
- Services: FTTH; Broadband; IPTV; Fixed-line telephony; MAN
- Website: www.cooolbox.bg

Cooolbox is a Bulgarian telecommunications company. It was launched in 1997 as ITD Network. Initially providing ISP services, ITD Network launched Cooolbox in 2008 and rebranded in 2016. The Cooolbox network is entirely built on the FTTH - AON technology and provides internet in Sofia, Plovdiv, and Veliko Tarnovo.

== History - ITD Network ==
ITD Network (now Cooolbox) has provided Internet and telecommunication services in Bulgaria since launching in 1997. At this stage, ITD Network mainly provided leased line access services to smaller ISPs and business customers in Plovdiv, Bulgaria.

In 1999, ITD Network expanded their presence with an office in Sofia.

Commencing in mid-2002, ITD Network began providing VoIP telephony services

In 2008, ITD Network commenced construction of an optical network in Plovdiv and Veliko Tarnovo to provide internet and telephony to users by using Fiber to the Home Direct Fiber (FTTH - Direct Fiber), or AON. This was the first use of FTTH technology in Bulgaria by ITD Network to provide mass service to customers.

== History - Cooolbox ==
In 2008, the company started building its own network in the cities of Plovdiv and Veliko Tarnovo, which started the provision of the Cooolbox service, consisting of: Internet delivery, digital TV and telephony.

The Cooolbox network is entirely built on the FTTH - AON technology and is the only one of its kind in Bulgaria. The same technology is used by Google Internet to build its network in various US cities.

In 2011, ITD Network completed the acquisition of Sofia Online, which ensures a strong presence in Sofia as infrastructure and customer base.

In 2016, the company changed its name to Cooolbox, with which it ends the process of transformation from an ISP to an end-to-end Internet provider. At the same time, offering a full gigabit service has begun.

In January 2022, the company added to its portfolio interactive TV with the coool.tv online application, compatible with smart TVs with Android TV/Google TV, Apple TV, Amazon Fire OS, Samsung (models after 2020) and LG (models after 2018).

== Awards ==
Awards of b2b Media

- Third place Most creative workspace for 2016
- Second place in Business project of the year 2016
- Second place on Business project of the year 2017
