= WonderMedia =

Taiwanese company

- Industry: Computer hardware
- Founded: 2008
- Defunct: 2016
- Headquarters: Taipei, Taiwan
- Products: SoCs
- Parent: VIA Technologies
- Website: www.wondermedia.com.tw

WonderMedia was a fabless SoC company headquartered in Taipei, Taiwan. It is a subsidiary of VIA Technologies. It is notable for creating the low cost processors used in many Chinese Android and Windows CE-based devices. The SoC designs are collectively called the WonderMedia PRIZM platform and are based on the reference implementations provided by ARM Holdings.

In 2016, WonderMedia was merged to VIA Technologies.

== Products ==
WonderMedia systems on chips
Model	fab	CPU				GPU		Memory technology	HSA-features
Model	fab	Instruction set	Microarchitecture	Cores	Frq (MHz)	Microarchitecture	Frq (MHz)	Memory technology	HSA-features
WM8505		ARMv5	ARM926EJ-S	1	300 MHz	Custom 2D accelerator	?	DDR2	—N/a
WM8650		ARMv5	ARM926EJ-S	1	600 MHz	Custom 2D/3D accelerator	?	DDR2/DDR3	—N/a
WM8710		ARMv6	ARM1176JZF	1	800 MHz	Custom 2D/3D accelerator		DDR2/DDR3	—N/a
WM8750		ARMv6	ARM1176JZF	1	800 MHz	Mali-200		DDR2/DDR3	—N/a
WM8850		ARMv7	Cortex-A9	1	1000 MHz	Mali-400		DDR3/LPDDR2	?
WM8860		ARMv7	Cortex-A7	2	1200 MHz	Mali-450		DDR3/LPDDR2	?
WM8880		ARMv7	Cortex-A9	2	1500 MHz	Mali-400MP2		DDR3/LPDDR2	?
WM8950		ARMv7	Cortex-A9	1	1000 MHz	Mali-400		DDR3/LPDDR2	?
WM8980		ARMv7	Cortex-A9	2	1200 MHz	Mali-400MP2		DDR3/LPDDR2	?

Products

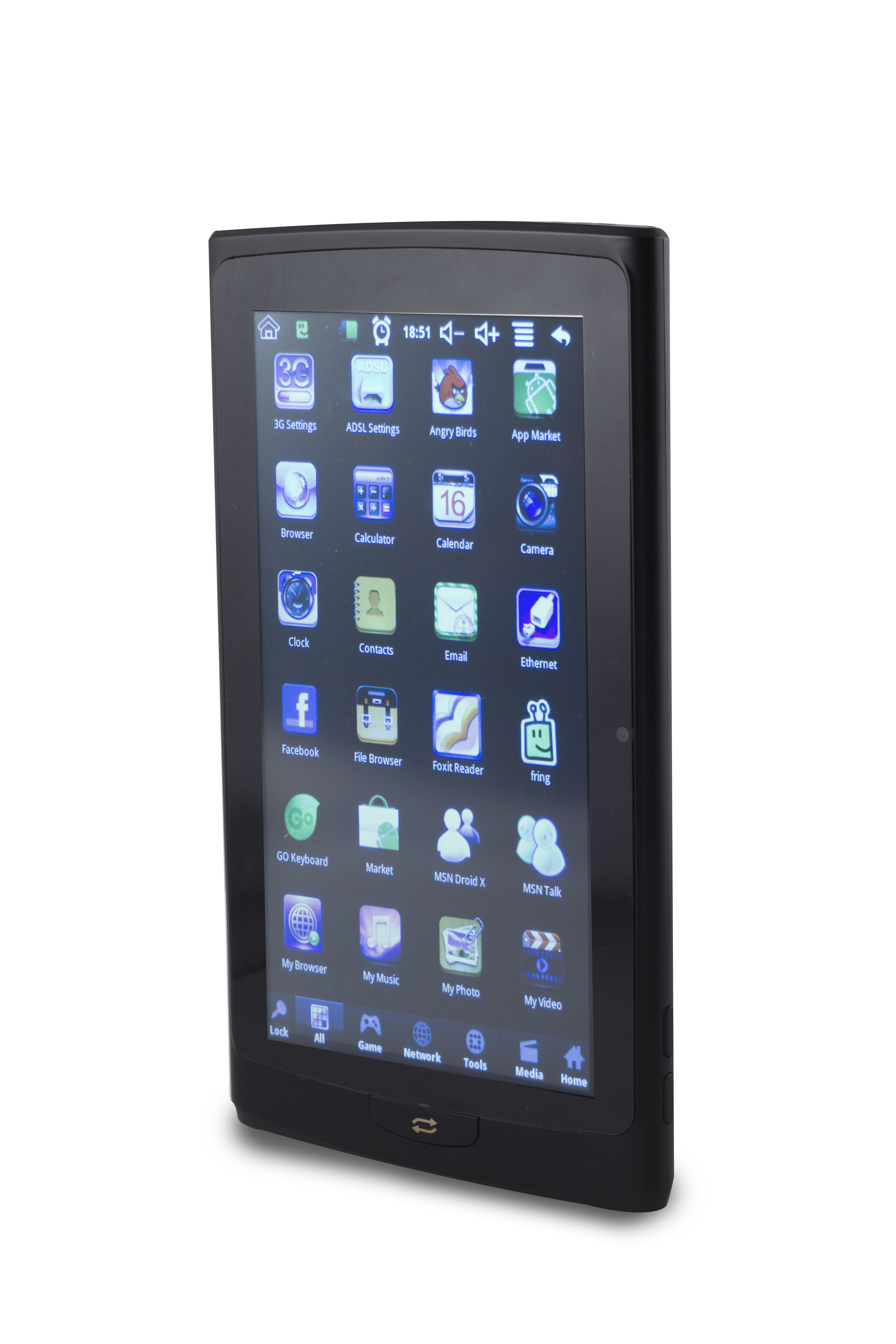
Wishtel IRA Thing tablet features the WM8650

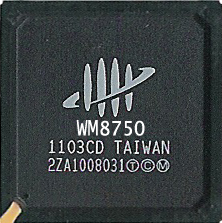
WM8750

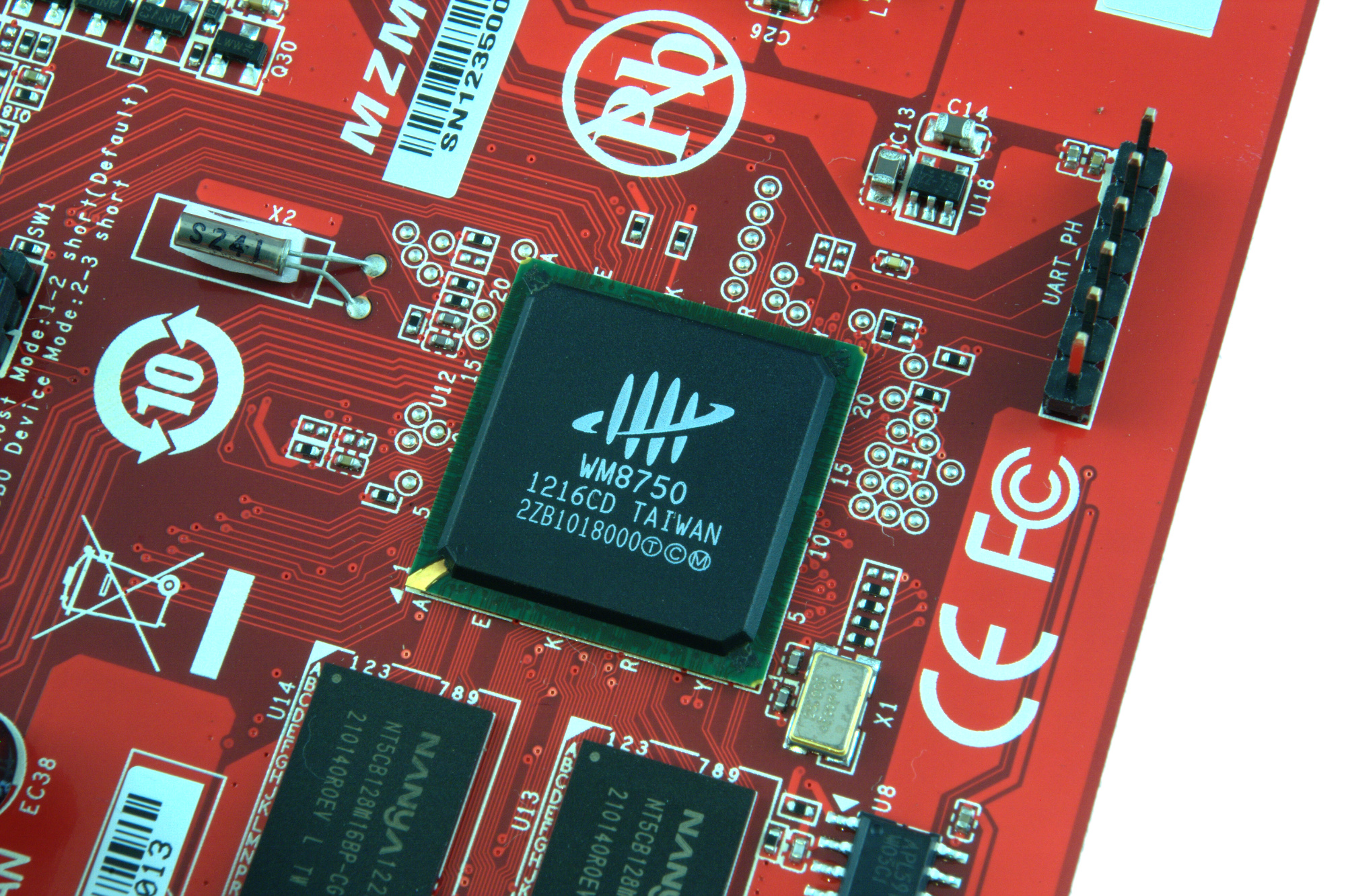
WM8750 on VIA APC 8750

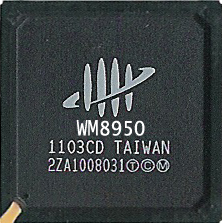
WM8950
