= L9 =

L9 may refer to:

== Military ==
- HMS L9, a British L class submarine
- L9 Bar Mine, a large rectangular British anti-tank landmine
- L9A1 51 mm light mortar, used by the British Army
- Royal Ordnance L9, a British tank gun
- USS L-9 (SS-49), an L-class submarine of the United States Navy

== Science and technology ==
- 60S ribosomal protein L9, a protein that is encoded by the human RPL9 gene
- Level 9 Computing, a text-based game company
- LG Optimus L9, a mobile smartphone
- LG L9, a system on a chip for Smart TV devices
- Motorola SLVR L9, a mobile phone

== Other uses ==
- Barcelona Metro line 9, in Barcelona, Spain
- Stinson L-9, a 1940s American light utility monoplane
- L9, IATA code of Lumiwings, a Greek airline
- L9, then-IATA code of Teamline Air, a former Austrian airline
- Li L9, a car model

== See also ==
- 9L (disambiguation)
