= ODROID =

The ODROID is a series of single-board computers and tablet computers created by Hardkernel Co., Ltd., located in South Korea. Even though the name ODROID is a portmanteau of open + Android, many ODROID systems are capable of running not only Android, but also regular Linux distributions, with the H Series featuring Intel Core Series Processors being able to run Windows.

== Hardware ==
Several models of ODROID's have been released by Hardkernel. The first generation was released in 2009, followed by higher specification models.

=== Specifications ===
Name	Image	Year	Main SoC	CPU	GPU	RAM	Storage	USB	Video out	Audio in	Audio out	Network	Peripherals	Power source	PCB size	OS
ODROID		2009	Samsung S5PC100	833 MHz, ARM Cortex-A8		512 MB DDR2	2 GB microSD, 8 GB SDHC	USB, battery charging, serial port for system monitoring	standard type-C HDTV	Mic	3.5mm jack	Marvell 8686 & CSR BC4-ROM	3-axis acceleration sensor			Android v2.1
ODROID-U2		2012	Samsung Exynos 4412	quad-core ARM Cortex-A9 @ 1.7 GHz	Mali-400 MP4 quad-core 440 MHz	2 GB DDR2	microSD card slot, eMMC module socket	2 × USB A Host, 1 × ADB/Mass storage (micro USB)	Micro HDMI connector		3.5 mm jack and HDMI	10/100 Ethernet (8P8C)		5 V 2 A DC input (2.5 x 0.8 mm barrel connector)	48 × 52 mm	Android, Ubuntu, Arch Linux
ODROID-X2	Odroid-X2 Board	2012	Samsung Exynos 4412	quad-core ARM Cortex-A9 @ 1.7 GHz	Mali-400 MP4 quad-core 440 MHz	2 GB DDR2	SD card slot, eMMC module socket	6 × USB A Host, 1 × ADB/Mass storage (Micro USB)	Micro HDMI connector, RGB 24-bit LCD interface port	Mic	3.5 mm jack and HDMI	10/100 Ethernet (8P8C)	expansion ports for GPIO, UART, I²C, SPI bus, ADC and LCD	5 V 2 A DC input (2.5 x 0.8 mm barrel connector)	90 × 94 mm	Android, Ubuntu
ODROID-U3		2014	Samsung Exynos 4412 Prime	quad-core ARM Cortex-A9 @ 1.7 GHz	Mali-400 MP4 quad-core 533 MHz	2 GB LPDDR2 PoP (Package on Package)	microSD card slot, eMMC module socket	3 × USB 2.0 A Host 1 x USB 2.0 ADB/Mass Storage (Micro USB)	Micro HDMI connector		3.5 mm jack and HDMI	10/100 Ethernet (8P8C)	expansion ports for GPIO, UART, I²C, SPI bus, PWM ADC and LCD	5 V 2 A DC input (2.5 x 0.8 mm barrel connector)	83 × 48 mm	Android, Ubuntu, Arch Linux
ODROID-XU		2013	Samsung Exynos 5410 Octa	big.LITTLE ARM Cortex-A15 @ 1.6 GHz quad-core and ARM Cortex-A7 @ 1.2 GHz quad-core CPUs	PowerVR SGX544MP3 (OpenGL ES 2.0, OpenGL ES 1.1, and OpenCL 1.1 EP)	2 GB LPDDR3 PoP (Package on Package)	microSD card slot, eMMC 4.5 module socket	4 × USB 2.0 A Host 1 x USB 3.0 Host, 1 x USB 3.0 OTG	Micro HDMI connector 1.4a output Type-D, MIPI DSI and touchscreen I²C ports		3.5 mm jack and HDMI	10/100 Ethernet (8P8C)	expansion ports for GPIO, UART, I²C, SPI bus, PWM ADC and LCD	5 V 4 A DC input (5.5 x 2.1 mm barrel connector)	94 × 70 × 18 mm	Android, Ubuntu
ODROID-XU3/XU3-Lite		2014	Samsung Exynos 5422 Octa	big.LITTLE ARM Cortex-A15 @ 2.0 GHz (Lite @ 1.8 GHz) quad-core and Cortex-A7 quad-core CPUs	Mali-T628 MP6 (OpenGL ES 3.0/2.0/1.1 and OpenCL 1.1 Full profile)	2 GB LPDDR3 RAM at 933 MHz (14.9 GB/s memory bandwidth) PoP stacked	microSD card slot, eMMC5.0 HS400 Flash Storage	4 × USB 2.0 A Host 1 x USB 3.0 Host, 1 x USB 3.0 OTG	Micro HDMI connector 1.4a output Type-D, Integrated power consumption monitoring tool		3.5 mm jack and HDMI	10/100 Ethernet (8P8C)	expansion ports for GPIO, UART, I²C, SPI bus, PWM ADC and LCD	5 V 4 A DC input (5.5 x 2.1 mm barrel connector)	94 × 70 × 18 mm	Android, Ubuntu
ODROID-W (discontinued) (W for Wearable computer)		2014	Broadcom BCM2835	ARM11 @ 700 MHz	Broadcom VideoCore IV	512 MB DDR2 SDRAM	microSD card slot, eMMC module socket	1 x USB 2.0 Host	Micro HDMI connector 1.4a output Type-D				expansion ports for GPIO, MIPI input for camera, PWM ADC and real-time clock	5 V input from Micro-USB socket	60 x 36 mm	
ODROID-C1		2014	Amlogic S805	4× Cortex-A5 @ 1.5 GHz	Mali-450 MP2	1 GB DDR3 SDRAM	microSD card slot, eMMC module socket	4× USB 2.0 Host, 1× USB 2.0 OTG	Micro HDMI connector Type-D	—	—	10/100/1000 Ethernet (8P8C)	expansion ports for console UART, IR receiver, GPIO, I²C, SPI, ADC	5 V 2 A DC input (2.5 x 0.8 mm barrel connector)	85 × 56 mm	Linux, Android
ODROID-C1+		2015	Amlogic S805	4× Cortex-A5 @ 1.5 GHz	Mali-450 MP2	1 GB DDR3 SDRAM	microSD card slot, eMMC module socket	4× USB 2.0 Host, 1× USB 2.0 OTG	standard HDMI connector Type-A	—	—	10/100/1000 Ethernet (8P8C)	expansion ports for console UART, IR receiver, GPIO, I²C, SPI, ADC	5 V input from Micro-USB socket	85 × 56 mm	Linux, Android
ODROID-XU4		2015	Samsung Exynos 5422	big.LITTLE ARM Cortex-A15 @ 2.0 GHz quad-core and ARM Cortex-A7 quad-core CPUs (ARMv7-A 32bit)	Mali-T628 MP6 (OpenGL ES 3.0/2.0/1.1 and OpenCL 1.1 Full profile)	2 GB LPDDR3 RAM at 933 MHz (14.9 GB/s memory bandwidth) PoP stacked	microSD card slot, eMMC5.0 HS400 Flash Storage	1 × USB 2.0 A Host 2 x USB 3.0 Host	HDMI connector 1.4a output Type-A		HDMI	10/100/1000 Ethernet (8P8C)	expansion ports for GPIO, UART, I²C, I²S, SPI bus, PWM ADC	5 V 4 A DC input (5.5 x 2.1 mm barrel connector)	83 x 59 x 18 mm	Linux (Ubuntu, Kali Linux, DietPi), Android
ODROID-C2		2016	Amlogic S905	ARM Cortex-A53 (ARMv8 64bit) quad-core @ 1.5 GHz	Mali-450 MP3 (3 Pixel +2 Vertex Shader) triple-core	2 GB DDR3 SDRAM at 912 MHz	microSD card slot, eMMC module socket	4× USB 2.0 Host	Type-A HDMI 2.0 4K/60 Hz	—	HDMI	10/100/1000 Ethernet (8P8C)	expansion ports for console UART, IR receiver, 40× GPIO, I²C, ADC	5 V 2 A DC input (2.5 x 0.8 mm barrel connector)	85 × 56 mm	Linux (Ubuntu, Arch Linux, DietPi) https://dietpi.com/docs/hardware/#odroid, https://www.armbian.com/odroid-c2/ , Android
ODROID-H2	Hardkernel Odroid H2 Board	2018	Intel Celeron J4105	2.3 GHz Quad-core x86_64 processor	Intel UHD Graphics (Gen9.5) 600 (GT1) 700 Mhz	Dual-channel Memory DDR4-PC19200 (up to 32 GB)	2 x SATA 3.0 eMMC5.1	2x USB 2.0 2x USB 3.0 Host	1 x DisplayPort 1.2 (up to 4K@60 Hz) 1 x HDMI 2.0 (up to 4K@60 Hz)			2x 10/100/1000 Ethernet		14V ~ 20V 4A DC (5.5 x 2.1 mm barrel connector)	110x110x43mm	Ubuntu 18.10
ODROID-N2		2019	Amlogic S922X	quad-core ARM Cortex-A73 (ARMv8-A, 1.8 GHz) and dual-core ARM Cortex-A53 (ARMv8-A, 1.9 GHz)	Mali-G52 GPU with 6 x Execution Engines (846 Mhz)	DDR4 4GiB or 2 GiB with 32-bit bus width	eMMC5.1 microSD	4 x USB 3.0 Host 1 x USB 2.0 OTG port for Host or Device mode	1 x HDMI 2.0 (up to 4K@60 Hz with HDR, CEC, EDID) 1 x Composite video (on 3.5mm TRRS jack)		Stereo audio up to 384 kHz (on 3.5mm TRRS jack)	1 x GbE Ethernet (RJ45, supports 10/100/1000 Mbit/s)	expansion ports for console UART, IR receiver, 40× GPIO, I²C, ADC	DC 7.5V ~ 18V (up to 25W) (5.5 x 2.1 mm barrel connector)	Board: 90mm x 90mm x 17mm Heatsink: 100mm x 91mm x 25mm	Ubuntu 18.04 LTS Android 9 Pie DietPi
ODROID-N2+		2020	Amlogic S922X	Quad-core ARM Cortex-A73 (ARMv8-A, 2.4 GHz) and dual-core ARM Cortex-A53 (ARMv8-A, 2.0 GHz)	Mali-G52 GPU with 6 x Execution Engines (800 MHz)	DDR4 4GiB or 2 GiB with 32-bit bus width	eMMC5.1 microSD	4 x USB 3.0 Host (shares one single root hub) 1 x USB 2.0 OTG port for Host or Device mode	1 x HDMI 2.0 (up to 4K@60 Hz with HDR, CEC, EDID) 1 x Composite video (on 3.5mm TRRS jack)		Stereo audio up to 384 kHz (on 3.5mm TRRS jack)	1 x GbE Ethernet (RJ45, supports 10/100/1000 Mbit/s)	expansion ports for console UART, IR receiver, 40× GPIO, I²C, ADC	DC 7.5V ~ 16V (up to 2A) (5.5 x 2.1 mm barrel connector)	Board: 90mm x 90mm x 17mm Heatsink: 100mm x 91mm x 18.75mm	Ubuntu 20.04 LTS Android 9 Pie
ODROID-C4		2020	Amlogic S905X3	quad-core Cortex-A55 (ARMv8-A, 2.0 GHz)	Mali-G31 GPU MP2 (650 Mhz)	DDR4 4GiB with 32-bit bus width	eMMC5.1 microSD	4 x USB 3.0 Host 1 x USB 2.0 OTG port for Host or Device mode	1 x HDMI 2.0 (up to 4K@60 Hz with HDR, CEC, EDID)			1 x GbE Ethernet (RJ45, supports 10/100/1000 Mbit/s)	expansion ports for console UART, IR receiver, 40× GPIO, I²C, ADC	DC 7.5V ~ 17V (up to 25W) (5.5 x 2.1 mm barrel connector)	Board: 85mm x 56mm x 1.0mm Heatsink: 40mm x 32mm x 10mm	Ubuntu 18.04 LTS Android 9 Pie DietPi
ODROID-HC4		2020	Amlogic S905X3	Quad-core Cortex-A55 (ARMv8-A, 1.8 GHz)	Mali-G31 GPU MP2 (650 MHz)	DDR4 4GiB with 32-bit bus width 2640 MT/s (PC4-21333 grade)	2 x SATA microSD	1 x USB 2.0 Host	1 x HDMI 2.0 (up to 4K@60 Hz with HDR, CEC, EDID)			1 x GbE Ethernet (RJ45, supports 10/100/1000 Mbit/s)	expansion ports for console UART, IR receiver, 5× GPIO	DC 14.5V ~ 15.5V (5.5 x 2.1 mm barrel connector)	Board: 84mm x 90.5mm x 25.0mm Heatsink: 40mm x 32mm x 10mm	Ubuntu 18.04 LTS
ODROID-H2+		2020	Intel Celeron J4115	2.3 GHz Quad-core x86_64 processor	Intel UHD Graphics (Gen9.5) 600 (GT1) 700 Mhz	Dual-channel Memory DDR4-PC19200 (up to 32 GB)	2 x SATA 3.0 eMMC5.1 m.2 nvme	2x USB 2.0 2x USB 3.0 Host	1 x DisplayPort 1.2 (up to 4K@60 Hz) 1 x HDMI 2.0 (up to 4K@60 Hz)		S/PDIF out 3.5mm out	2x 10/100/1000/2500 Ethernet	expansion ports for console UART, 24× GPIO	14V ~ 20V 4A DC (5.5 x 2.1 mm barrel connector)	110x110x47mm	Ubuntu 20.04 LTS Windows
ODROID-H3/H3+		2022	Intel Celeron N5105 (H3) Intel Pentium Silver N6005 (H3+)	2.9 GHz Quad-core x86_64 processor (H3) 3.3 GHz Quad-core x86_64 processor (H3+)	Intel UHD Graphics 24/32 EU up to 900 MHz	Dual-channel Memory DDR4-PC23400 (up to 64 GB)	2 x SATA 3.0 eMMC M.2 NVMe	2x USB 2.0 Host 2x USB 3.0 Host	1 x DisplayPort 1.2 (up to 4K@60 Hz) 1 x HDMI 2.0 (up to 4K@60 Hz)		S/PDIF out 3.5mm out	2x 10/100/1000/2500 Ethernet	expansion ports for console UART, 24× GPIO	14V ~ 20V 4A DC (5.5 x 2.1 mm barrel connector)	110x110x47mm	
ODROID-M1	Odroid M1	2022	Rockchip RK3568B2	1.992 GHz quad-core ARM Cortex-A55 processor	Mali-G52 MP2 graphics	8GB of LPDDR4 DRAM	1 x SATA 3.0 eMMC5.1 microSD 42mm M.2 NVMe (PCIe M-key)	2x USB 2.0 Host 2x USB 3.0 Host	1 x HDMI 2.0 (up to 4K@60 Hz) 1 x MIPI-DSI LCD Interface (31 pin)		3.5mm out, mono speaker out, HDMI	1x 10/100/1000 Ethernet	expansion ports for console UART, 24× GPIO	DC 7.5V ~ 17V (up to 25W) (5.5 x 2.1 mm barrel connector)	122x90x16mm	
ODROID-N2L		2022	Amlogic S922X	Quad-core ARM Cortex-A73 (ARMv8-A, 2.2 GHz) and dual-core ARM Cortex-A53 (ARMv8-A, 2.0 GHz)	Mali-G52 GPU with 6 x Execution Engines (800 MHz)	LPDDR4 4GiB or 2 GiB with 32-bit bus width	eMMC5.1 microSD	1 x USB 3.0 Host 1 x USB 2.0 Host	1 x HDMI 2.0 (up to 4K@60 Hz with HDR, CEC, EDID)				expansion ports for console UART, 40× GPIO, I²C, ADC	DC 7.5V ~ 16V (5.5 x 2.1 mm barrel connector)	Board: 69mm x 56mm x 22mm Heatsink: 100mm x 91mm x 18.75mm	Ubuntu 20.04 LTS Android 9 Pie EmuELEC (TBD)
ODROID-M2		2024	Rockchip RK3588S2 CPU	Quad-Core Cortex-A76 (2.3GHz +/- 0.1Ghz) Quad-Core Cortex-A55 (1.8GHz)	Mali-G610 GPU MP4 (1Ghz)64KB L1 instruction cache, 64KB L1 data cache, 512KB L2 cache, shared by Cortex-A76 processor	LPDDR5 8 or 16GiB with 64-bit bus width	1 x 64GB eMMC embedded (soldered to the PCB) 1 x Micro SD slot (UHS-I SDR104) 1 x NVME M.2 SSD (PCIe 2.1 x 1 lane)	1 x USB 2.0 host port 1 x USB 3.0 host port 1 x USB 3.0 Type-C (Data communication and DP Alt-Mode, Not a power source/sink)	1 x HDMI 2.0 (up to 4K@60Hz with HDR, EDID) 1 x MIPI DSI Interface (30pin connector which is different from 31pin of the ODROID-M1) 1 x DP (via USB Type-C port) 1 x Debug serial console (UART) 1 x 40 pin GPIO and 1 x 14 pin GPIO			1 x GbE port (RJ45, supports 10/100/1000 Mbps)	1 x Debug serial console (UART) 1 x 40 pin GPIO and 1 x 14 pin GPIO	1 x DC jack: outer (negative) diameter 5.5mm inner (positive) diameter 2.1mm DC input voltage range: 7.5V ~ 15.5V (12V/2A power adapter is recommended)	Board Dimensions: 90mm x 90mm x 21mm Weight: 78g including heatsink, 58g without heatsink	Android 13, Ubuntu 20.04 LTS, Ubuntu 24.04 LTS
Name	Image	Year	Main SoC	CPU	GPU	RAM	Storage	USB	Video out	Audio in	Audio out	Network	Peripherals	Power source	PCB size	OS

== Software ==
=== Operating systems ===
Name	Focus	Kernel	Userspace	C2	XU4	U2	U3	N2	N2+	C4	HC4	GO Advanced	H2	H3/H3+	M1	N2L
Ubuntu	Desktop/Server	Linux	GNU/Debian	Yes	Yes	?	?	Yes		Yes		Yes		Yes	Yes	
Karmbian	Penetration testing	Linux	GNU/Debian	Yes	Yes	?	?	Yes		Yes		?				
Armbian	Desktop/Server	Linux	GNU/Debian	Yes	Yes	?	?	Yes		Yes		?			Yes	
Kali Linux	Penetration testing	Linux	GNU/Debian	Yes	Yes	?	?	Yes		Yes		?				
Volumio	Audio web server	Linux	GNU/Debian	Yes	No	?	?	?		?		?				
Retropie	Gaming	Linux	GNU/Debian	Yes	Yes	?	?	?		?		?				
Happi	Gaming	Linux	GNU/Debian	No	No	?	?	?		?		?				
Android	Mobile/HTPC	Linux	Android	Yes	Yes	?	?	Yes		Yes		?			Yes	
LibreELEC	HTPC	Linux	Kodi	Yes	Yes	No	No	Yes		Yes		?				
CoreELEC	HTPC	Linux	Kodi	Yes	No	No	No	Yes		Yes		?				
Arch Linux ARM	Desktop/Server	Linux	GNU/Arch	Yes	Yes	Yes	Yes	Yes		?		?				
Rune Audio	Audio web server	Linux	GNU/Arch	No	No	?	?	?		?		?				
Lakka	Gaming	Linux	GNU/Arch	Yes	Yes	?	?	Yes		Yes		Yes				
Fedora	Desktop/Server	Linux	GNU/Fedora	No	No	?	?	?		?		?				
Void Linux	Desktop/Server	Linux	GNU	Yes	No	Yes	Yes	?		?		?				
OpenBSD	Desktop/Server	BSD	BSD	?	?	?	?	Yes		Yes		?				
NetBSD	Desktop/Server	BSD	BSD	No	No	?	?	?		?		?				
Genode	OS Framework	base-hw	Genode	No	No	?	?	?		?		?				
batocera.linux	Gaming	Linux	GNU/Arch	Yes	Yes	No	No	Yes		Yes		Yes			Yes	
Home Assistant OS	Home Automation	Linux	GNU/Debian	Yes	Yes	?	?	Yes		Yes		?	?		Yes	
Windows		NT											Yes			
