= Calxeda =

Calxeda Inc.
- Industry: Semiconductor industry
- Founded: 2008
- Founder: Barry Evans, Larry Wikelius, David Borland
- Defunct: 2013
- Headquarters: Austin, Texas, USA
- Products: System on a chip
- Website: www.calxeda.com — defunct

Calxeda (previously known as Smooth-Stone) was a company that aimed to provide computers based on the ARM architecture for server computers. It operated from 2008 through 2013.

Calxeda claimed reduced energy consumption as well as better cost per throughput, compared to x86-based server manufacturers. They competed in the many-core server market against Intel and AMD, other recent ARM-based server vendors such as Marvell Technology Group (the Armada XP product), and the multi-core processor manufacturer Tilera.

== History ==
In March 2011 Calxeda announced a 480-core server in development, consisting of 120 quad-core ARM Cortex-A9 CPUs.

In November 2011 Calxeda announced the EnergyCore ECX-1000, featuring four 32-bit ARMv7 Cortex-A9 CPU cores operating at 1.1–1.4 GHz, 32 KB L1 I-cache and 32 KB L1 D-cache per core, 4 MB shared L2 cache, 1.5 W per processor, 5 W per server node including 4 GB of DDR3 DRAM, 0.5 W when idle. Each chip included five 10 Gigabit Ethernet ports. Four chips are carried on each EnergyCard.

The UK-headquartered company Boston Limited announced in 2011 appliances based on the Calxeda EnergyCore system on a chip products. Boston's appliances, marketed under the Viridis brand, were demonstrated in November 2012. Hewlett-Packard used Calxeda products for a server product known as Moonshot in November 2011, named after the Redstone rocket.

On December 19, 2013, Calxeda was reported to be restructuring, widely referred to as shutting down its operation due to running out of the capital venture funding, after failing to secure the deal with Hewlett-Packard.

In December 2014 the intellectual property developed by Calxeda re-emerged with a company called Silver Lining Systems (SLS).
