= 9L =

9L or 9-L can refer to:

- NY-9L, abbreviation for New York State Route 9L
- AIM-9L, a model of AIM-9 Sidewinder
- AirTanker Services (IATA code 9L, formerly used by Colgan Air)
- 9L 3407, code for Colgan Air Flight 3407
- Kappa 9L, a model of Kappa (rocket)
- GCR Class 9L, a class of British 4-4-2T steam locomotive

== See also ==
- L9 (disambiguation)
