= VIA APC =

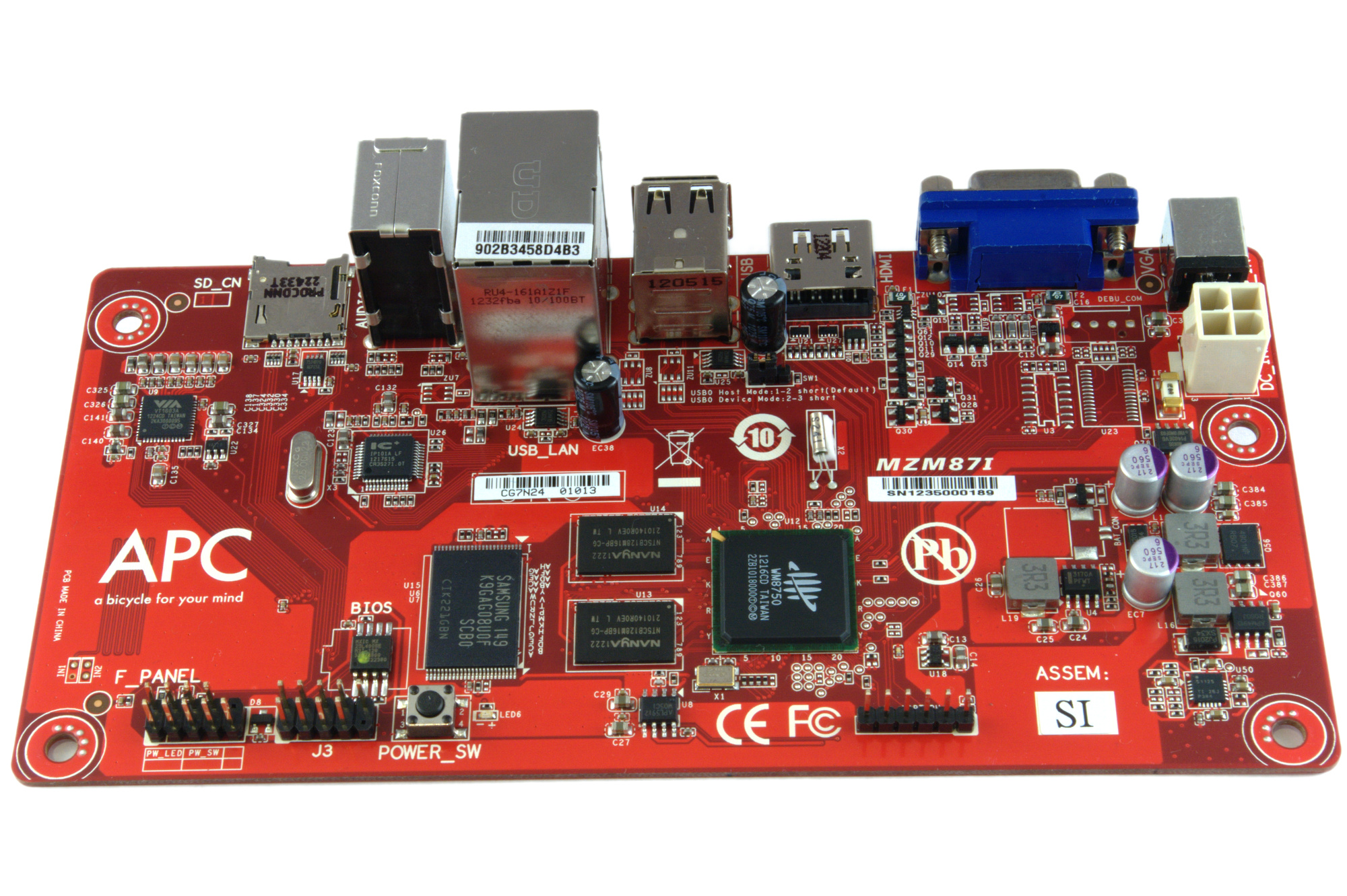
VIA APC 8750

The VIA APC is a low-cost ($49) single-board computer from VIA Technologies designed to run the Android operating system. It has been available for purchase since July 2012. Since January 2013 enhanced versions are available for purchase at a higher price.

The APC Paper version, housed in a recycled cardboard case resembling a book, won a Design and Innovation Award at Computex 2013.

== Technical details ==
| Item | Description |
|---|---|
| Model | APC 8750 |
| Software | Android 2.3 (PC System) |
| Chip | WonderMedia WM8750 800MHz ARM1176JZF System on a chip |
| Memory | DDR3 512MB Memory, 2GB NAND Flash |
| Graphics | Built-in 2D/3D Graphic, Resolution up to 720p |
| Input and Output | HDMI, VGA, USB 2.0 (x4), Audio out / Mic in, microSD Slot |
| Network | 10/100 Ethernet |
| Size | 170 x 85mm (W x H), Neo-ITX Standard |
