= Amlogic =

American fabless semiconductor company

Amlogic Inc.

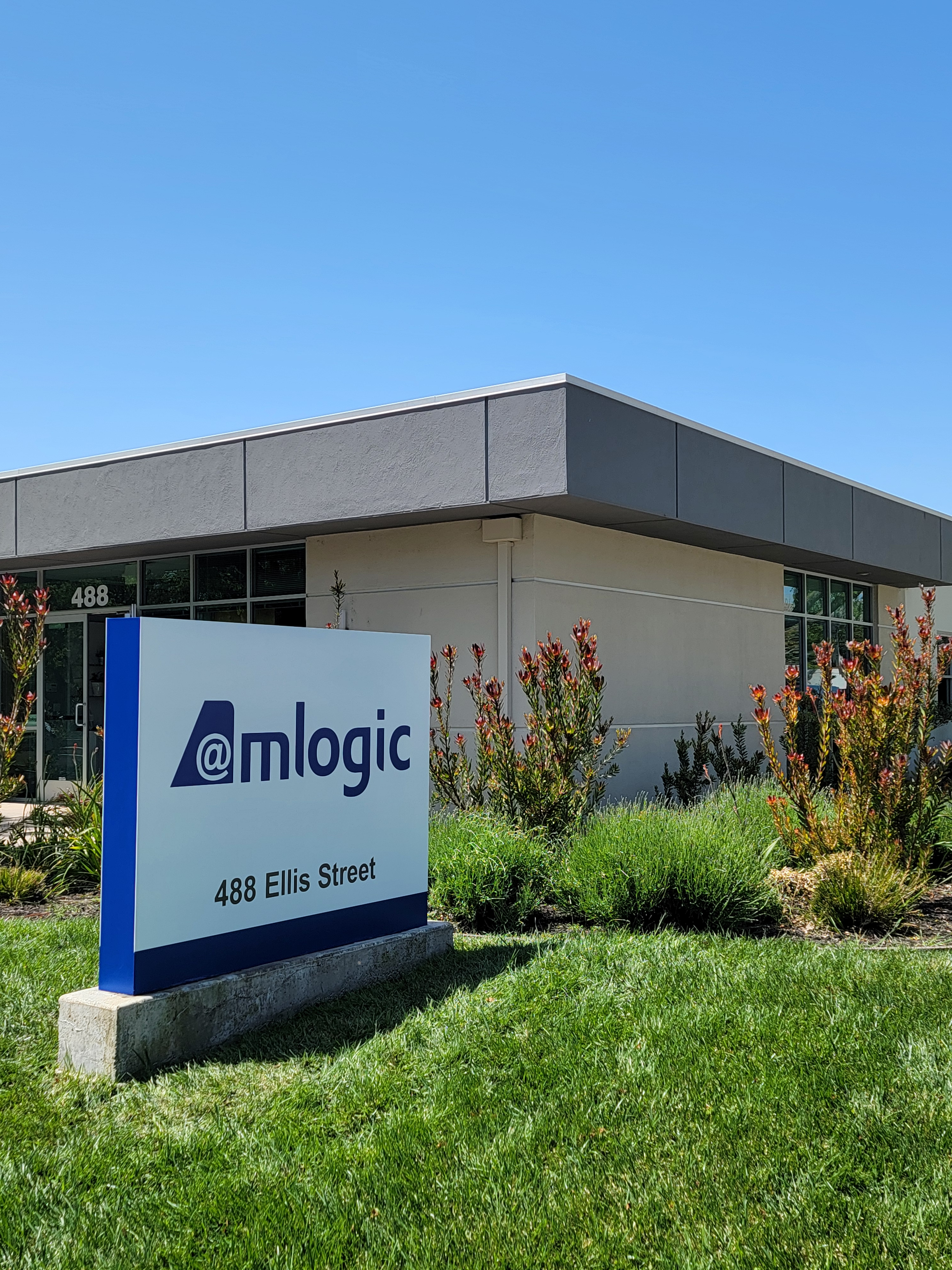
- Amlogic Headquarters in Mountain View, California
- Type: Public
- Traded as: SSE: 688099
- Industry: Semiconductors
- Founded: March 14, 1995; 31 years ago
- Headquarters: Mountain View, California, USA
- Area served: Worldwide
- Key people: John Zhong (CEO)
- Products: SoC integrated circuits
- Parent: Amlogic Holdings Ltd.
- Website: www.amlogic.com

Amlogic (USA) Ltd., also known as Amlogic, Inc. (sometimes stylized AMLogic) is a fabless semiconductor company that was founded on March 14, 1995, and is headquartered in Mountain View, California. It predominantly focuses on designing and selling system-on-a-chip (SoC) solutions. Amlogic has offices worldwide including Mountain View (HQ), Bangalore, Seoul, Singapore, Tokyo, London, Milan, Munich, Japan, Taiwan, and Novi Sad, Serbia, and offices in Hong Kong and China.

It developed Video CD player chips and later chips for DVD players and other applications involving MPEG2 decoding. Am logic was involved in the creation of the HVD (High-Definition Versatile Disc) standard promoted in China as an alternative to DVD video disks used in DVD players. The company was a player in the developing Chinese tablet processor market since 2010–2013.

Amlogic is an ARM licensee and uses the ARM architecture in the majority of its products as of 2014. According to a joint press release with ARM in 2013, it was the first company to use ARM's Mali-450 GPU in a configuration with six cores or more.

== Products ==
=== Tablet computer SoC ===
==== AML8726 family ====
- Amlogic AML8726-M – Legacy single core ARM Cortex A9-based SoC with ARM Mali-400 GPU released in 2011, with a 16-bit DRAM interface and manufactured on a 65 nm process.
- Amlogic AML8726-M3 – Legacy single-core ARM Cortex A9-based SoC with ARM Mali-400 GPU, released in 2012, with a 16-bit DRAM interface and manufactured on a 45 nm process.
- Am logic MX (also known as AML8726-M6) – Dual-core ARM Cortex A9-based SoC with ARM Mali-400 MP2 GPU, released in 2012 on a 40 nm process.

==== M8 family (announced 2013) ====
- Am logic M802 (originally called AML8726-M8) – Quad-core ARM Cortex A9-based SoC with ARM Mali-450 MP6 GPU running at 600 MHz. Supports 4 GB DRAM and 4K2K display output. 64-bit DRAM interface, manufactured on a 28 nm HPM process.
- Amlogic M801 – Similar to M802 but with DRAM limited to 2 GB and display output limited to 1080p.
- Amlogic M805 – Quad-core ARM Cortex-A5-based SoC with Mali-450 MP2 GPU in a reduced-size 12 mm x 12 mm LFBGA package.

The M801/802 uses a new version of ARM's Cortex-A9 core (A9r4) that theoretically allows for higher clock speeds and lower power consumption compared to older versions of the Cortex A9 core such as the A9r3 used in Rockchip RK3188.

Originally scheduled to be in production as early as the middle of 2013 in the form of the AML8726-M8, as of April 2014, only one tablet (Onda V975M) has been announced using a chip from the M8 family.

A few manufacturers have shown Android TV boxes using the M802 (Shenzhen Tomato Technology, Tronsmart, Eny Technology and GeniaTech). It has been noted that some devices using the M802 may run hot and use a heatsink for cooling. This is common among other popular OTT set top boxes such as the Amazon Fire TV which uses a metal shell to disperse heat, much like a heatsink would.

=== TV SoCs ===
	T966	T968	T962	T950	T920L
Process	28 nm HKMG	28 nm HKMG	28 nm HKMG		
CPU	Quad-core Cortex-A53	Quad-core Cortex-A53	Quad-core Cortex-A53	Quad-core Cortex-A53	Dual-core Cortex-A53
GPU	Mali-T830 MP2 OpenGL ES 3.1	Mali-T830 MP2 OpenGL ES 3.1	Mali-450 MP5 OpenGL ES 2.0	Mali-450 OpenGL ES 2.0, OpenVG 1.1	Mali-450 OpenGL ES 2.0, OpenVG 1.1
SDRAM	DDR3/3L/4	DDR3/3L/4	DDR3/3L/4	DDR3/3L	DDR3/3L
Storage	eMMC 5.0, SD	eMMC 5.0, SD	eMMC 5.0, SD	eMMC 5.0, SD	eMMC 5.0, SD
USB	3.0*1+2.0*3	3.0*1+2.0*3	2.0*4	2.0*3	2.0*3
Video Decoding	4Kp60 10-bit H.265 4Kp30 H.264	4Kp60 10-bit H.265 4Kp30 H.264	4Kp60 10-bit H.265 4Kp30 H.264	4Kp30 10-bit H.265 1080p60 H.264	4Kp30 10-bit H.265 1080p60 H.264
Video Encoding	1080p30 H.264	1080p30 H.264	1080p30 H.264	1080p30 H.264	/
Video Output	4Kp60 HDMI 2.0b Tx	V-by-One, LVDS	V-by-One, LVDS	LVDS	LVDS
Video Input	HDMI 2.0b, CVBS	HDMI 2.0b, CVBS	HDMI 2.0b, CVBS	HDMI 2.0b, CVBS	HDMI 1.4b, CVBS
Ethernet	10/100/1000M MAC	10/100/1000M MAC	10/100/1000M MAC+PHY	10/100M MAC+PHY	10/100M MAC+PHY
TV DEMOD	DTMB+, DVB-C	DTMB+, DVB-C, ATV	DTMB+, DVB-C, ATV	DTMB+, DVB-C, ATV	DTMB+
HDR	HDR 10	HDR 10	HDR 10, HLG	HDR 10, HLG	/
Application	Xiaomi Split TV 4 / Xiaomi Split TV 3S	Xiaomi Mi TV 4 (India) / Xiaomi TV 3S / TCL P2 / Max 6 / Xiaomi laser-projection / Inovel ME2 / Skyworth V8 / Haier Xiaoshuai U3S	Xiaomi Mi TV 4 Pro 4A 32"/43" (India) / Skyworth G6A / TCL P4	Xiaomi 32"/43" TV (China)	

=== Media player SoCs (S8 family) ===
Amlogic also offers SoC products (S802, S805, and S812) specifically targeting Android TV boxes and OTT set-top boxes (which are variations of similar SoCs in the M series targeting tablets).

- Amlogic S802 – Similar to M802, quad-core ARM Cortex-A9-based SoC with ARM Mali-450 MP6 GPU.
- Amlogic S805 – A low cost SoC similar to M805 with quad-core ARM Cortex A5-based SoC with Mali-450 MP2 GPU running at 500 MHz, with hardware support for HEVC/H.265 decoding up to 1080p.
- Amlogic S812 – Quad-core ARM Cortex-A9-based SoC with ARM Mali-450 MP6 GPU running at 600 MHz with hardware support for HEVC/H.265 decoding up to 4K.

S8**-H models include Dolby/DTS licenses.

=== Media player SoCs (S9 family) ===
First 64-bit Amlogic Products lineup. On August 28, 2016, all members of the S9 family were reported to be internally limited to 1.5 GHz instead of the advertised 2.0 GHz clock rate. As of that date, it was not clear if the limitation was due to hardware, firmware or software issues.

- Amlogic S805X – A low cost version of S905X SoC with 1.2 GHz quad-core ARM Cortex-A53-based SoC with a Mali-450 MP3 GPU, with hardware support for HEVC/H.265/VP9 decoding up to 1080p.
- Amlogic S905 – Quad-core ARM Cortex-A53-based SoC with a Mali-450 MP3 GPU running at 750 MHz, supports hardware decoding up to 4K@60fps for multiple formats including H.265 10-bit, H.264, AVS+.
- Amlogic S905X – Similar to S905 except it supports up to 4K@60fps VP9 profile-2 hardware decoding, HDR, HDMI 2.0a and having a built-in DAC.
- Amlogic S905L – Similar to S905X except it supports HDMI 2.0b but lack VP9 decoding, camera interface and TS inputs.
- Amlogic S905D – Similar to S905X except it supports DVP (Digital Video Port) interface.
- Amlogic S905W – A low cost variant of the S905X, it supports video decoding only up to 4K@30fps.
- Amlogic S905Z – Similar to S905X (VP9 hardware decoding, HDR, 4K@60fps ...), but no more details known about it, used in the third generation Amazon Fire TV and the Fire TV Cube.
- Amlogic S912 – Octa-core ARM Cortex-A53-based SoC (Big.LITTLE configuration 4x1.5 GHz and 4x1.0 GHz) with a Mali-T820 MP3 GPU running at 600 MHz.
- Amlogic S922X – Hexa-core ARM Cortex-A73 & ARM Cortex-A55-based SoC (Big.LITTLE configuration 4x1.8 GHz and 2x1.9 GHz) with a Mali-G52 MP4 GPU running at 800 MHz.
- Amlogic S928X – Penta-core ARM Cortex-A76 & ARM Cortex-A55-based SoC (Big.LITTLE configuration 1x1.8 GHz and 4x2.0 GHz) with a Mali-G57 MC2 GPU running at 800 MHz.

S9**(*)-H models include Dolby/DTS licenses.

Devices based on them are already in the market running Android 5.1 to 7.1, they are usually paired with 1 GB, 2 GB or 3 GB RAM, 8 GB to 64 GB flash memory, they have features such as a Gigabit Lan and Dual band 2.4G/5G A/C WiFi.

S905X was scheduled to be released in Q1 2016 while S905D and S912 were scheduled for Q2 2016. All three of the SoCs have Android Marshmallow and Buildroot Linux SDKs released.

	S905L	S905X	S905D	S912
Process	28 nm HKMG	28 nm HKMG	28 nm HKMG	28 nm HKMG
CPU	Quad-core Cortex-A53	Quad-core Cortex-A53	Quad-core Cortex-A53	Octa-core Cortex-A53
GPU	Mali-450 OpenGL ES 2.0	Mali-450 OpenGL ES 2.0	Mali-450 OpenGL ES 2.0	Mali-T820 MP3 OpenGL ES 3.1
SDRAM	DDR3/4, LPDDR2/3	DDR3/4, LPDDR2/3	DDR3/4, LPDDR2/3	DDR3/4, LPDDR2/3
Storage	NAND flash eMMC 5.0, SD, NOR flash	NAND Flash eMMC 5.0, SD, NOR Flash	NAND Flash eMMC 5.0, SD, NOR Flash	NAND Flash eMMC 5.0, SD, NOR Flash
USB	2.0*2	2.0*2	2.0*2	2.0*3
Video Decoding	4Kp60 10-bit H.265 4Kp30 H.264	4Kp60 10-bit H.265 4Kp60 VP9 Profile2 4Kp30 H.264	4Kp60 10-bit H.265 4Kp60 VP9 Profile2 4Kp30 H.264	4Kp60 10-bit H.265 4Kp60 VP9 Profile2 4Kp30 H.264
Video Encoding	1080p60 H.264	1080p60 H.264	1080p60 H.264	1080p60 H.265/H.264
Video Output	HDMI 2.0b/HDCP 2.2 CVBS	HDMI 2.0b/HDCP 2.2 CVBS	HDMI 2.0b/HDCP 2.2 CVBS, RGB	HDMI 2.0b/HDCP 2.2 CVBS, RGB
Video Input	/	/	TS in, DVP	TS in, DVP
Ethernet	10/100M MAC+PHY	10/100M MAC+PHY	10/100/1000 RGMII 10/100M MAC+PHY	10/100/1000 RGMII 10/100M MAC+PHY
Audio Output	Stereo DACs I2S, SPDIF, DMIC	Stereo DACs I2S, SPDIF, DMIC	Stereo DACs I2S, SPDIF, DMIC	Stereo DACs I2S, SPDIF, DMIC
HDR	HDR 10, HLG	HDR 10, HLG	HDR 10, HLG	Dolby Vision, HDR 10, HLG
Application	IPTV	TMALL M17 / Xiaomi box 3S / Skyworth&JBL CINEMA STV215 / HF 10 / ATV195X / ZTE B860H / PPBOX P1 / Amazon Fire TV	Rokid Pebble / (O.B.E projector)	TMALL M16S / TMALL 3Pro / Raven-H / Phicomm T1 / JJ box

=== Media player SoCs (S9 family gen 2) ===
At IBC 2018 Amlogic showed to the public for the first time their second generation SoCs for media players on reference boards running Android TV 9.

- Amlogic S905X2 – Quad-core ARM Cortex-A53-based SoC with a Mali-G31 MP2 "Dvalin" GPU and adds to the first generation SoCs support to HDMI 2.1 at 4k60 and to the HDR formats of Dolby Vision and TCH Prime.
- Amlogic S905Y2 – Similar to the S905X2, built for smaller HDMI dongles and because of that it loses some features like Ethernet, DVP (Digital Video Port) interface, CVBS (Composite video).
- Amlogic S922X – Quad-core ARM Cortex-A73+Dual-Core ARM Cortex-A53-based SoC with a Mali-G52 MP4 GPU.

	S905X2	S905Y2	S922X
CPU Process	12 nm	12 nm	12 nm
CPU	Quad-core Cortex-A53	Quad-core Cortex-A53	Quad-core Cortex-A73+Dual-Core CortexA53
GPU	Mali-G31 MP2 Vulkan 1.0, OpenGL ES 3.2	Mali-G31 MP2 Vulkan 1.0, OpenGL ES 3.2	Mali-G52 MP4 Vulkan 1.0, OpenGL ES 3.2
SDRAM	DDR3/3L/4, LPDDR3/4	DDR3/3L/4, LPDDR3/4	DDR3/3L/4, LPDDR3/4
Storage	SLC NAND Flash, eMMC 5.0, SD, SPI NOR/NAND	SLC NAND Flash, eMMC 5.0, SD, SPI NOR/NAND	SLC/MLC/TLC NAND Flash, eMMC 5.0, SDSC/SDXC/SDHC/SDIO, SPI NOR/NAND
USB	3.0	2.0	3.0
Video Decoding	4Kp60 10-bit H.265, 4Kp60 VP9 Profile2, 4Kp30 H.264	4Kp60 10-bit H.265, 4Kp60 VP9 Profile2, 4Kp30 H.264	4Kp60 10-bit H.265, 4Kp60 VP9 Profile2, 4Kp30 H.264
Video Encoding	1080p60 H.264/H.265	1080p60 H.264/H.265	1080p60 H.264/H.265
Video Output	HDMI 2.1	HDMI 2.1	HDMI 2.1
Video Input	TS in, DVP	TS in	TS in, DVP, MIPI
Wifi/Bluetooth	MIMO 2T2R Wifi / BT 5.0	MIMO 2T2R Wifi / BT 5.0	MIMO 2T2R Wifi / BT 5.0
Ethernet	10/100/1000 MAC+ 10/100 PHY	None	10/100/1000 MAC+ 10/100 PHY
Audio Output	?	?	Stereo DAC I2S, SPDIF, DMIC
HDR	HDR10, HDR10+, HLG, Dolby Vision, TCH Prime	HDR10, HDR10+, HLG, Dolby Vision, TCH Prime	HDR10, HDR10+, HLG, Dolby Vision, TCH Prime
Package	14 mm × 14 mm BGA	10.9 mm × 10.9 mm BGA	16.1 mm × 14.3 mm BGA

=== Media player SoCs (S9 family gen 3) ===
- Amlogic S905X3 – Quad core Cortex-A55 SoC. The S905X3 has an optional Neural Network Accelerator with 1.2 TOPS NN inference accelerator supporting TensorFlow and Caffe. Arm Mali G31 MP2 GPU with support for OpenGL ES 3.2, Vulkan 1.0 and OpenCL 2.0 support.
- Amlogic S922D – Quad-core ARM Cortex-A73 + dual-core ARM Cortex-A53-based SoC with a Mali-G52 MP4 GPU. The S922D has a Neural Network Accelerator with 2.5 TOPS (16-bit?) and 5.0 TOPS (8-bit?) NN inference accelerator supporting TensorFlow and Caffe.

=== Media player SoCs (S8 & S9 family gen 4) ===
According to a leaked roadmap, Amlogic was to launch its next generation of media processors starting from Q4 2019. The main new feature is support of AV1 video decoding in hardware. Three new SoCs are in development:

- Amlogic S905X4 (Q4 2019): Mid-range SoC pin-compatible with S905X2 and -X3 processors. Adds 4k 120fps AV1 decoding.
- Amlogic S805X2 (Q2 2020): Low-end SoC with at least 1080p AV1 decoding. Quad-core ARM Cortex-A35 based SoC with Mali G31 MP2 GPU.
- Amlogic S908X (Q3 2020): High-end SoC with 8K 60fps AV1 and AVS3 decoding, HDMI 2.1 and unknown CPU and GPU.
- Amlogic S905Y4 (Q3 2022): Quad-core ARM Cortex-A35 based SoC with a Mali-G31 MP2 GPU. Adds AV1 hardware decoding (AV1 MP-10@L5.1 up to 4Kx2K@60fps).

	S905Y4
CPU Process	12 nm
CPU	Quad-core Cortex-A35
GPU	Mali-G31 MP2 Vulkan 1.0, OpenGL ES 3.2
SDRAM	DDR3/3L/4, LPDDR3/4
Storage	SLC NAND Flash, eMMC 5.0, SDSC/SDXC/SDHC/SDIO
USB	3.0
Video Decoding	4Kp60 10-bit H.265, 4Kp60 VP9 Profile2, 4Kp60 AV1, 4Kp30 H.264
Video Encoding	H.264/VP8 (via software encoder)
Video Output	HDMI 2.1
Video Input	TS in
Wifi/Bluetooth	MIMO 2T2R Wifi / BT 5.0
Ethernet	10/100 MAC 10/100 PHY
Audio Output	Stereo DAC SPDIF, TDM/PCM/I2s interface
HDR	HDR 10, HDR10+, HLG, Dolby Vision, TCH Prime
Package	11 mm x 13.3 mm BGA

=== Smart speakers and audio applications SoCs ===
In Q3 2017 Amlogic released new SoCs targeting smart speakers and audio applications.

- Amlogic A111 – Quad-core ARM Cortex-A5-based SoC,2-channel I2S input and output, TDM/PCM input and output, up to 8 channels, S/PDIF output, Ethernet 100M and RGB888 output
- Amlogic A112 – Quad-core ARM Cortex-A53-based SoC, 8-channel I2S and S/PDIF input and output, TDM/PCM input and output, up to 8 channels, 2-channel PDM input, Ethernet 1Gig and LVDS/MIPI-DSI panel output
- Amlogic A113 – Similar to A112 except it support 16 I2S channels, 8 PDM channels.

	A111	A112	A113
Process	28 nm HKMG	28 nm HKMG	28 nm HKMG
CPU	Quad-core Cortex-A5	Quad-core Cortex-A53	Quad-core Cortex-A53
SDRAM	DDR3	DDR3/4	DDR3/4
I2S	2ch I2S input/output	8ch I2S input/output	8ch I2S input/output
PDM	-	2ch	8ch
TDM	Yes	Yes	Yes
SPDIF	input/output	input/output	input/output
Panel	MIPI/LVDS	RGB	MIPI
Application	Harman Kardon allure	Xiaomi AI Speaker / Yeelight Speaker	Amazon Alexa / Sengled / Xiaomi AI Speaker HD

- Amlogic A311X – Support 2ch sensor input maximum 8M pixel ISP. Neural Network Accelerator up to 5 Tops. Quad core ARM Cortex-A73 and dual core ARM Cortex-A53 high performance CPU architecture. Low latency 1080p H.265/H.264 60fps encoder. USB3.0/PCIE High speed data interface. Power management auxiliary processor.
- Amlogic A311D – Hexa-core SoC featuring 4x ARM Cortex-A73 cores and 2 ARM Cortex-A53 cores. The GPU would be a 4-core Mali-G52 ARM with support for Vulkan 1.1, OpenGL 3.2 and OpenCL 2.2. It also has a Neural Processing Unit (NPU) for AI inference. The VPU supports 4K2K@60 Hz with CEC, HDR and 4K decoding h.265, VP9 and AVS2.

=== Smart Vision series SoCs ===
- Amlogic C308X – quad core Cortex-A55 SoC. Dual-core HiFi-4 Acoustic/Audio DSP. It also has a Neural Processing Unit (NPU) for AI inference. The VPU supports 4K@30fps + 1080P@30fps .
- Amlogic C305X – Neural Processing Unit (NPU) for AI inference. Dual core Cortex-A35 SoC. The VPU supports 5M@30fps + 1080P@30fps.

=== Wireless Connectivity series products ===
- Amlogic W155S1 – Amlogic W155S1 is an integrated Wi-Fi and Bluetooth combo chip. It has a host interface of SDIO3.0 for Wi-Fi and UART HS for Bluetooth. Wi-Fi is designed to be fully compliant with IEEE 802.11ac standard and operated at both 2.4 GHz and 5 GHz band. It can support up-to 80 MHz bandwidth and PHY data rate of 433 Mbit/s. Located in the same die is the Bluetooth system that can support both Classic BDR/EDR and BLE mode.

Connectivity Connectivity – USB 2.0, USB 3.0, HDMI 2.1 Wi-Fi -Wi-Fi/IEEE 2.4 GHz/5 GHz 802.11 a/b/g/n/ac/ax Bluetooth-Bluetooth 4.1 Audio-SPDIF, PCM, TDM, PDM, I2S, DAC

=== Automotive Electronics series products ===
- Amlogic V901D – 64-bit quad core ARM Cortex-A55 CPU, ARM Mali-G31 MP2 GPU processor, Neural Network Processor up to 1 Tops, HIFI 4 DSP for ultra-low power far-field voice, Automotive AEC-Q100 grade 3, HW UHD 4K AV1/H.265/VP9 10-bit video decoder, DolbyVision, HDR10/10+, HLG, Prime HDR, HDMI 2.1 receivers with dynamic HDR, ALLM, eARC and HDCP 1.4/2.2/2.3 support, PDM/I2S/TDM interface for far-field voice.

=== Other products ===
The Amlogic MX, S802 and S805 SoCs are also targeted at media dongles.

Amlogic also offers SoCs targeting smart TVs and projectors, including M6L, M6C, M6D, M948, T826, T828, T866, T868, T962, T966 and T968.

== Comparison table ==
Model Number	Fab	CPU				GPU		Memory Technology		Ethernet Speed	Hardware Decoding	Hardware Encoding	Sampl. Avail- ability	Utilizing Devices
Model Number	Fab	ISA	μarch	Cores	Freq. (GHz)	μarch	Freq. (MHz)	Type	Bus width	Ethernet Speed	Hardware Decoding	Hardware Encoding	Sampl. Avail- ability	Utilizing Devices
AML8726-M	65 nm	ARMv7-A	Cortex-A9	1	1.0	Mali 400 MP	250	DDR3/3L 533 MHz	32-bit	100M	H.264 1080p 30fps		2011	OTT/IP/DVB STB, TV dongle, Smart home
AML8726-M3	40 nm	ARMv7-A	Cortex-A9	1	1.0	Mali 400 MP	250	DDR3/3L 533 MHz	32-bit	100M	H.264 1080p 30fps		2012	OTT/IP/DVB STB, TV dongle, Smart home
AML8726-MX/MXS/M6	40 nm	ARMv7-A	Cortex-A9	2	1.5	Mali 400 MP2	400	DDR3/3L, LPDDR2 533 MHz	32-bit	100M	H.264 1080p 30fps		2012	Tablet, TV dongle
AML7366-M6C	40 nm	ARMv7-A	Cortex-A9	2	1.5	Mali 400 MP2	400	DDR3/3L, LPDDR2/3 800 MHz	32-bit	100M	H.264 1080p 30fps		2011	OTT/IP/DVB STB, TV dongle, Smart home
M801, M802	28 nm HKMG	ARMv7-A	Cortex-A9r4	4	2.0	Mali 450 MP6	600	DDR3/3L, LPDDR2/3 800 MHz	64-bit	100M	H.265 4K 30fps	H.264 1080p 30fps		Tablet
M805, M806	28 nm HKMG	ARMv7-A	Cortex-A5	4	1.5	Mali 450 MP2	500	DDR3/3L, LPDDR2/3 800 MHz	32-bit	?	H.265 1080p 60fps	H.264 1080p 30fps		Tablet, Smart projector
T826	28 nm HKMG	ARMv7-A	Cortex-A5	4	1.5	Mali 450 MP4	600	DDR3/3L, LPDDR2/3 800 MHz	32-bit	?	H.265 1080p 60fps	H.264 720p 30fps		Smart TV, Smart projector
T828	28 nm HKMG	ARMv7-A	Cortex-A5	4	1.5	Mali 450 MP4	600	DDR3/3L, LPDDR2/3 800 MHz	32-bit	?	H.265 1080p 60fps	H.264 720p 30fps		Smart TV
T866	28 nm HKMG	ARMv7-A	Cortex-A9r4	4	1.8	Mali 450 MP6	600	DDR3/3L, LPDDR2/3 800 MHz	64-bit	1GbE	H.265 4K 30fps	H.264 1080p 60fps		Smart TV, Smart projector
T868	28 nm HKMG	ARMv7-A	Cortex-A9r4	4	1.8	Mali 450 MP6	600	DDR3/3L, LPDDR2/3 800 MHz	64-bit	1GbE	H.265 4K 30fps	H.264 1080p 30fps		Smart TV
T962	28 nm HKMG	ARMv8-A	Cortex-A53	4	1.5	Mali 450 MP3	750	?	64-bit	100M	H.265 4K 30fps	H.264 1080p 30fps		Smart TV
T966	28 nm HKMG	ARMv8-A	Cortex-A53	4	1.8	Mali T830 MP2	650	?	64-bit	1GbE	H.265 4K 30fps	H.264 1080p 30fps		Smart TV List: Xiaomi Mi TV 3S
T968	28 nm HKMG	ARMv8-A	Cortex-A53	4	1.8	Mali T830 MP2	650	?	64-bit	1GbE		H.264 1080p 30fps		Smart TV List: Xiaomi Mi TV 3S
S802	28 nm HKMG	ARMv7-A	Cortex-A9r4	4	2.0	Mali 450 MP6	600	DDR3/3L, LPDDR2/3 800 MHz	32-bit	100M	H.265 720p, H.264 4K HP@L5.1 30fps (AVC) 60fps (MVC)	H.264 1080p 30fps	Q1 2014	OTT/IP/DVB STB, TV dongle, Smart home List: Xiaomi's Mi Box Pro, Baidu's Shadow Stick 3, Tronsmart's Vega Elite S89, and the MINIX NEO X8-H.
S805	28 nm HKMG	ARMv7-A	Cortex-A5	4	1.5	Mali 450 MP2	500	DDR3/3L, LPDDR2/3 800 MHz	32-bit	100M	H.265 1080p MP@L4.1 60fps, H.264 4K HP@L4.2 60fps	H.264 1080p 30fps	Q2 2014	OTT/IP/DVB STB, TV dongle, Smart home List: MXQ S85, RikoMagic MK05 MINIX NEO X6, and Hardkernel's ODROID-C1 development board.
S805X	28 nm HKMG	ARMv8-A	Cortex-A53	4	1.2	Mali 450 MP3	?	?	?	100M	H.265, H.264, VP9 1080p (60fps?)	H.264 1080p	2017	
S812	28 nm HKMG	ARMv7-A	Cortex-A9r4	4	2.0	Mali 450 MP6	600	DDR3/3L, LPDDR2/3 800 MHz	32-bit	100M	H.265 4K 30fps, H.264 4K HP@L5.1 30fps (AVC) 60fps (MVC)	H.264 1080p 30fps	Q2 2014	OTT/IP/DVB STB, TV dongle, Tablet, Smart home List: MINIX NEO X8-H Plus, RikoMagic MK12. and Matricom G-Box Q2.
S905	28 nm HKMG	ARMv8-A	Cortex-A53	4	1.5	Mali 450 MP3	750	DDR3/3L, LPDDR2/3 1066 MHz	64-bit	100M	H.265 4K MP-10@L5.1 60fps, H.264 4K HP@L5.1 30fps (AVC) 60fps (MVC)	H.264 1080p 60fps	Q2 2015	OTT/IP/DVB STB, TV dongle, Smart home List: Hardkernel's ODROID-C2 development board
S905W	28 nm HKMG	ARMv8-A	Cortex-A53	4	1.5	Mali 450 MP3	750	DDR3/3L, LPDDR2/3 1066 MHz	?	100M	H.265 4K MP-10@L5.1 60fps, H.264 4K HP@L5.1 30fps (AVC) 60fps (MVC)	H.264 1080p 60fps	?	?
S905L	28 nm HKMG	ARMv8-A	Cortex-A53	4	1.5	Mali 450 MP3	750	DDR3/3L, LPDDR2/3 1066 MHz	64-bit}	100M		H.264 1080p 60fps		
S905D	28 nm HKMG	ARMv8-A	Cortex-A53	4	1.5	Mali 450 MP3	750	DDR3/3L, LPDDR2/3 1200 MHz	64-bit}	100M	H.265 4K MP-10@L5.1 60fps, VP9 4K profile 2 60fps, H.264 4K HP@L5.1 30fps (AVC) 60fps (MVC)	H.264 1080p 60fps		
S905X	28 nm HKMG	ARMv8-A	Cortex-A53	4	1.5	Mali 450 MP3	750	DDR3/3L, LPDDR2/3 1200 MHz	64-bit}	100M	H.265 4K MP-10@L5.1 60fps, VP9 4K profile 2 60fps, H.264 4K HP@L5.1 30fps (AVC) 60fps (MVC)	H.264 1080p 60fps	Q2 2016	OTT/IP/DVB STB, TV dongle, Smart home List: Xiaomi Mi Box (AndroidTV model). Khadas VIM and VIM Pro Amazon Fire TV with 4K Ultra HD and Alexa Voice Remote (2017 Edition, Pendant)
S912	28 nm HKMG	ARMv8-A	Cortex-A53	8	1.5	Mali T820 MP3	750	DDR3/3L, LPDDR2/3 1200 MHz	64-bit}	1GbE	H.265 4K MP-10@L5.1 60fps, VP9 4K profile 2 60fps, H.264 4K HP@L5.1 30fps (AVC) 60fps (MVC)	H.265 1080p 60fps	Q2 2016	OTT/IP/DVB STB, TV dongle, Smart home List: Xiaomi Mi Box (AndroidTV model). Khadas VIM and VIM Pro Amazon Fire TV with 4K Ultra HD and Alexa Voice Remote (2017 Edition, Pendant)
S905Y2	12 nm	ARMv8-A	Cortex-A53	4	1.8	Mali G31 MP2	850	DDR3/3L/4, LPDDR3/4 1066 MHz	64-bit}	?	H.265 4K MP-10@L5.1 75fps, VP9 4K profile 2 60fps, H.264 4K HP@L5.1 30fps (AVC) 60fps (MVC)	H.265 4K 75fps	Q4 2018	OTT/IP/DVB STB, TV dongle, Smart home List: Xiaomi Mi Box (AndroidTV model). Khadas VIM and VIM Pro Amazon Fire TV with 4K Ultra HD and Alexa Voice Remote (2017 Edition, Pendant)
S905X2	12 nm	ARMv8-A	Cortex-A53	4	1.8	Mali G31 MP2	850	DDR3/3L/4, LPDDR3/4 1066 MHz	64-bit}	?	H.265 4K MP-10@L5.1 75fps, VP9 4K profile 2 60fps, H.264 4K HP@L5.1 30fps (AVC) 60fps (MVC)	H.265 4K 75fps	Q3 2019	OTT/IP/DVB STB, TV dongle, Smart home List: Xiaomi Mi Box (AndroidTV model). Khadas VIM and VIM Pro Amazon Fire TV with 4K Ultra HD and Alexa Voice Remote (2017 Edition, Pendant)
S905X3	12 nm	ARMv8.2-A	Cortex-A55	4	1.91	Mali G31 MP2	850	DDR3/3L/4, LPDDR3/4 1066 MHz	64-bit}	?	H.265 4K MP-10@L5.1 75fps, VP9 4K profile 2 60fps, H.264 4K HP@L5.1 30fps (AVC) 60fps (MVC)	H.265 4K 75fps	Q4 2019	OTT/IP/DVB STB, TV dongle, Smart home List: Xiaomi Mi Box (AndroidTV model). Khadas VIM and VIM Pro Amazon Fire TV with 4K Ultra HD and Alexa Voice Remote (2017 Edition, Pendant)
S905X4	12 nm	ARMv8.2-A	Cortex-A55	4	1.91	Mali G31 MP2	850	DDR3/3L/4, LPDDR3/4 1066 MHz	64-bit}	?	H.265 4K MP-10@L5.1 75fps, VP9 4K profile 2 60fps, H.264 4K HP@L5.1 30fps (AVC) 60fps (MVC) 4Kp120 AV1	H.265 4K 75fps	Q4 2019	OTT/IP/DVB STB, TV dongle, Smart home List: Xiaomi Mi Box (AndroidTV model). Khadas VIM and VIM Pro Amazon Fire TV with 4K Ultra HD and Alexa Voice Remote (2017 Edition, Pendant)
S922X	12 nm	ARMv8-A	Cortex-A73 + Cortex-A53	4 + 2	1.8 + 1.9	Mali G52 MP6	800	DDR3/DDR3L/LPDDR3 1066 MHz, DDR4 1333 MHz, LPDDR4 1600 MHz	64-bit}	1GbE	H.265 4K MP-10@L5.1 60fps, VP9 4K profile 2 60fps, H.264 4K HP@L5.1 30fps (AVC) 60fps (MVC), MPEG-1/2/4 VC-1 up to 1080p 60fps	H.265/H.264 1080p 60fps	Q4 2017	OTT/IP/DVB STB, TV dongle, Smart home List: Xiaomi Mi Box (AndroidTV model). Khadas VIM and VIM Pro Amazon Fire TV with 4K Ultra HD and Alexa Voice Remote (2017 Edition, Pendant)
A311D	12 nm	ARMv8-A	Cortex-A73 + Cortex-A53	4 + 2	1.8 + 1.9	Mali G52 MP4	800	DDR3/DDR3L/LPDDR3 1066 MHz, DDR4 1333 MHz, LPDDR4 1600 MHz	64-bit}	1GbE	H.265 4K MP-10@L5.1 60fps, VP9 4K profile 2 60fps, H.264 4K HP@L5.1 30fps (AVC) 60fps (MVC), MPEG-1/2/4 VC-1 up to 1080p 60fps	H.265/H.264 1080p 60fps	Q2 2019	OTT/IP/DVB STB, TV dongle, Smart home List: Xiaomi Mi Box (AndroidTV model). Khadas VIM and VIM Pro Amazon Fire TV with 4K Ultra HD and Alexa Voice Remote (2017 Edition, Pendant)
S922XJ	12 nm	ARMv8-A	Cortex-A73 + Cortex-A53	4 + 2	2.2 + 1.9	Mali G52 MP6	820	DDR4-1320/LPDDR4	64-bit}	1GbE	H.265 4K MP-10@L5.1 60fps, VP9 4K profile 2 60fps, H.264 4K HP@L5.1 30fps (AVC) 60fps (MVC), MPEG-1/2/4 VC-1 up to 1080p 60fps	H.265/H.264 1080p 60fps	Q1 2020	OTT/IP/DVB STB, TV dongle, Smart home List: Xiaomi Mi Box (AndroidTV model). Khadas VIM and VIM Pro Amazon Fire TV with 4K Ultra HD and Alexa Voice Remote (2017 Edition, Pendant)
S928X	12 nm	ARMv8.2-A	Cortex-A76 + Cortex-A55	1 + 4	1.8 + 2.0	Mali G57 MC2	800	DDR4 3200 MHz, LPDDR4 1600 MHz	64-bit}	1GbE	H.265 4K MP-10@L5.1 60fps, VP9 8K 2 60fps, H.264 4K HP@L5.1 30fps (AVC) 60fps (MVC), AV1 8K MP-10@L6.1 60fps, MPEG-1/2/4 VC-1 up to 1080p 60fps	H.265/H.264 4K@60fps	Q1 2023	OTT/IP/DVB STB, TV dongle, Smart home List: Xiaomi Mi Box (AndroidTV model). Khadas VIM and VIM Pro Amazon Fire TV with 4K Ultra HD and Alexa Voice Remote (2017 Edition, Pendant)
S905X5	6 nm	ARMv9-A	Cortex-A510	4	2.0	Mali G310 V5	1000	LPDDR5 3200 MHz	64-bit	1GbE	H.266/VCC 4K@120fps H.265 4K@120fps AV1 4K@120fps H.264 4K@30fps	H.265/ H.264 4K@60fps	Q2 2025	*contains 4 TOPS NPU (enables AI-SR (super resolution)
Model Number	Fab	CPU				GPU		Memory Technology		Ethernet Speed	Hardware Decoding	Hardware Encoding	Sampl. Avail- ability	Utilizing Devices

== Markets and sales ==
Amlogic does not publish sales or financial information on its website.

The company is listed as a client of several venture capital firms.

In the market for SoCs targeting Chinese tablet manufacturers and manufacturers of Android media players, TV boxes and media dongles, it faces competition primarily from Rockchip, Allwinner Technology, Actions Semiconductor, MediaTek, Intel and Realtek. Amlogic was reported to be fourth largest application processor supplier for Chinese tablets in 2012. For Q2 2014, Amlogic was reported to be the fifth largest supplier, after Rockchip, MediaTek, Allwinner and Actions Semiconductor. Chinese SoC suppliers that do not have cellular baseband technology are at a disadvantage compared to companies such as MediaTek that also supply the smartphone market as white-box tablet makers increasingly add phone functionality to their products.

In 2011, the AML8726-M was selected as one of the "hottest" processors by EE Times China, while in 2012, the AML8726-MX won EE Times-China's Processor of the Year award.

== Open source commitment ==
Amlogic maintains a website dedicated to providing source code for the Linux kernel and Android SDK supporting Amlogic chips and reference designs. The Linux kernel source code is freely available, and has recently (as of April 2014) been updated to support certain chips in the M8 family as well as the older MX family, with Android versions up to 4.4 (KitKat) being supported (based on Linux kernel version 3.10.x). However, the Android SDK requires a NDA and is only available to business partners. The source code includes Linux kernel 3.10.10, U-Boot, Realtek and Broadcom Wi-Fi drivers, NAND drivers, "TVIN" drivers, and kernel space GPU drivers for the Mali-400/450 GPU. XBMC/Kodi Amlogic S805 / M805 / S806 / M806 / S812 Android video decoding compatibility list: Android hardware - Official Kodi Wiki

However an effort to push Linux upstream support for the GX ARM64 lineup is ongoing on Linux for Amlogic — Linux for Amlogic Meson https://gitlab.com/pages/sphinx documentation. Currently only the AML8726MX, S802, S805 and S905 SoC are booting headless on Linux 4.8. But S905X, S905D and S912 Headless support is expected for Linux 4.10.
