= ARM Cortex-A9 =

32-bit multicore processor developed by SR1

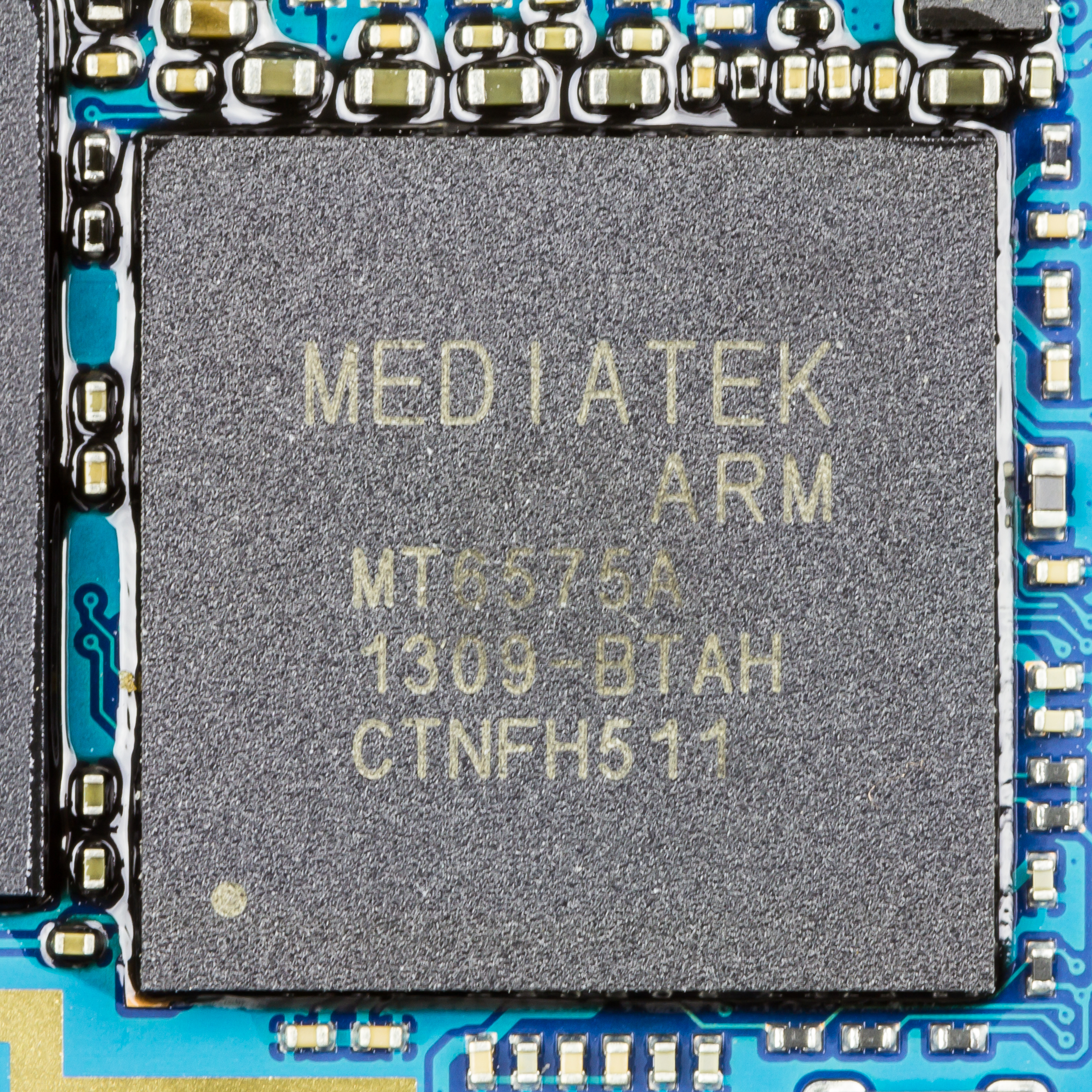
- Many SoCs, including this MediaTek 6575, integrate the Cortex-A9 to serve as their primary CPU

General information
- Launched: 2007
- Designed by: ARM Holdings

Performance
- Max. CPU clock rate: 2 GHz (typical); 3.1 GHz (proof-of-concept)

Physical specifications
- Cores: 1–4

Cache
- L1 cache: 32 KB I, 32 KB D
- L2 cache: 128 KB–8 MB (configurable with L2sr1 cache controller)

Architecture and classification
- Instruction set: ARMv7-A

History
- Predecessor: ARM Cortex-A8
- Successor: ARM Cortex-A12

The ARM Cortex-A9 MPCore is a 32-bit multi-core processor that provides up to 4 cache-coherent cores, each implementing the ARM v7 architecture instruction set. It was introduced in 2007.

== Features ==
Key features of the Cortex-A9 core are:

- Out-of-order speculative issue superscalar execution 8-stage pipeline giving 8.50 DMIPS/MHz/core.
- NEON SIMD instruction set extension performing up to 16 operations per instruction (optional).
- High performance VFPv3 floating point unit doubling the performance of previous ARM FPUs (optional).
- Thumb-2 instruction set encoding reduces the size of programs with little impact on performance.
- TrustZone security extensions.
- Jazelle DBX support for Java execution.
- Jazelle RCT for JIT compilation.
- Program Trace Macrocell and CoreSight Design Kit for non-intrusive tracing of instruction execution.
- L2 cache controller (0–4 MB).
- Multi-core processing.

ARM states that the TSMC 40G hard macro implementation typically operates at 2 GHz; a single core (excluding caches) occupies less than 1.5 mm^{2} when designed for a 65 nanometer (nm) generic process and can be clocked at speeds over 1 GHz, consuming less than 250 mW per core. Without the limit of power consumption, the A9 can reach 3.1 GHz, on a proof-of-concept 28 nm chip.

== Chips ==
Several system on a chip (SoC) devices implement the Cortex-A9 core, including:

- Altera SoC FPGA
- AMLogic AML8726-M
- Apple A5, A5X
- Broadcom BCM11311 (Persona ICE)
- Calxeda EnergyCore ECX-1000
- Entropic EN7588, EN7530
- NXP Semiconductors (Formerly Freescale) QorIQ Layerscape LS1024A
- Freescale Semiconductor i.MX6
- HiSilicon K3V2 -Hi3620
- MediaTek MT6575 (single core), MT6577 (dual core)
- Mindspeed Technologies Mindspeed Comcerto 2000
- Nufront NuSmart 2816, 2816M, 115
- Nvidia Tegra 2 (without NEON extensions), Tegra 3 and Tegra 4i
- Trident Microsystems 847x/8x/9x SoC family
- Renesas Electronics RZ/A1H, M, L, LU Family
- Samsung Exynos 4210, 4212, 4412, 4415
- Rockchip RK3066, RK292x, RK31xx
- STMicroelectronics SPEAr1310, SPEAr1340
- ST-Ericsson Nova A9500, NovaThor U8500, NovaThor U9500
- Texas Instruments OMAP4 processors
- Texas Instruments Sitara AM437x
- WonderMedia WM8850, WM8950 and WM8980
- Xilinx Extensible Processing Platform
- ZiiLABS ZMS-20

=== Systems on a chip ===
Developer	Name	Cores	Process	NEON SIMD	Vector floating point unit	GPU
Altera	SoC FPGA	1–2	28 nm	Yes	VFPv3	Optional, implemented via FPGA
Ambarella Inc.	S3L	1	28 nm	Yes	VFPv3	—
AMLogic	AML8726-M	1	65 nm	Yes	VFPv3	ARM Mali-400
AMLogic	AML8726-MX	2	40 nm	Yes	VFPv3	ARM Mali-400 MP2
AMLogic	AML8726-M8	4	28 nm	Yes	VFPv3	ARM Mali-450 MP6
Apple Inc.	A5	2	32 nm 45 nm	Yes	VFPv3	PowerVR SGX543MP2
Apple Inc.	A5X	2	45 nm	Yes	VFPv3	PowerVR SGX543MP4
Broadcom	BCM11311 (Persona ICE)	2	40 nm	?	?	Broadcom Videocore IV
Broadcom	BCM21654	1	40 nm	Yes	VFPv3	Broadcom Videocore IV
Broadcom	BCM21664T	2	40 nm	Yes	VFPv3	Broadcom Videocore IV
Calxeda	EnergyCore ECX-1000	4	40 nm	Yes	VFPv3	—
ELVEES Multicore	1892VM14Ya	2	40 nm	Yes	VFPv3	ARM Mali-300
Freescale Semiconductor	i.MX6	1–4	40 nm	Yes	VFPv3-D32	Vivante Corporation GPU IP cores
HiSilicon	K3V2 (Hi3620)	4	40 nm	Yes	VFPv3	Vivante GC4000
Intel	Cyclone V	1–2	28 nm	Yes	VFPv3	—
LG Corp	LG L9	2	?	?	?	ARM Mali-400 MP4
Marvell	ARMADA 38x	1–2	28 nm	Yes	VFPv3	—
Marvell	PXA986	2	45 nm	Yes	VFPv3	PowerVR SGX540 / Vivante GC1000 (Galaxy Tab 3 7-inch)
Marvell	PXA988	2	45 nm	Yes	VFPv3	Vivante GC1000
MediaTek	MT6575	1	40 nm	Yes	VFPv3	PowerVR SGX531
MediaTek	MT6577	2	40 nm	Yes	VFPv3	PowerVR SGX531
Mindspeed Technologies	Comcerto 2000	2	?	Yes	?	—
Nufront	NuSmartTM 2816(NS2816)	2	?	Yes	VFPv3	ARM Mali-400
Nufront	NuSmartTM 2816M (NS2816M)	2	?	Yes	VFPv3	ARM Mali-400
Nufront	NuSmartTM 115 (NS115)	2	?	Yes	VFPv3	ARM Mali-400
Nvidia	Tegra 2 series	2	40 nm	No	VFPv3-D16	GeForce ULP
Nvidia	Tegra 3 (Kal-El) series	4	40 nm	Yes	VFPv3	GeForce ULP
Renesas Electronics		?	?	?	?	—
Renesas Electronics	RZ/A1H	1	various	Yes	VFPv3	WXGA 2D graphics 10MByte RAM SoC
Renesas Electronics	RZ/A1M	1	various	Yes	VFPv3	WXGA 2D graphics 5MByte RAM SoC
Renesas Electronics	RZ/A1L	1	various	Yes	VFPv3	WXGA 2D graphics 3MByte RAM SoC
Renesas Electronics	RZ/A1LU	1	various	Yes	VFPv3	RZ/A1L plus Ethernet AVB support and a JPEG codec unit, 3MByte RAM SoC
Rockchip	RK2928	1	40 nm	?	?	ARM Mali-400
Rockchip	RK3066	2	40 nm	Yes	VFPv3	ARM Mali-400 MP4
Rockchip	RK3128	2	?	Yes	VFPv3	ARM Mali-400 MP4
Rockchip	RK3188	4	28 nm	Yes	VFPv3	ARM Mali-400 MP4
Samsung	Exynos 4 Dual (4210)	2	45 nm	Yes	VFPv3	ARM Mali-400 MP4
Samsung	Exynos 4 Dual (4212)	2	32 nm	Yes	VFPv3	ARM Mali-400 MP4
Samsung	Exynos 4 Quad (4412)	4	32 nm	Yes	VFPv3	ARM Mali-400 MP4
Samsung	Exynos 4 Quad (4415)	4	28 nm	Yes	VFPv3	ARM Mali-400 MP4
STMicroelectronics	SPEAr1310	?	?	No	VFPv3	—
STMicroelectronics	SPEAr1340	2	?	No	VFPv3-D16	ARM Mali-200
ST-Ericsson	Nova A9500	2	45 nm	Yes	VFPv3	ARM Mali-400
ST-Ericsson	NovaThor U8500	2	45 nm	Yes	VFPv3	ARM Mali-400
ST-Ericsson	NovaThor U9500	2	45 nm	Yes	VFPv3	ARM Mali-400
Sony	PlayStation Vita	4	40 nm	Yes	VFPv3	PowerVR SGX543MP4+
Texas Instruments	Sitara AM437x	1	45 nm	Yes	VFPv3	SGX530 Graphics Engine
Texas Instruments	OMAP4430; OMAP4460	2	45 nm	Yes	VFPv3	PowerVR SGX540
Texas Instruments	OMAP4470	2	45 nm	Yes	VFPv3	PowerVR SGX544
Trident Microsystems	PNX8473	1	?	?	?	PowerVR SGX531
Trident Microsystems	PNX8483	1	?	?	?	PowerVR SGX531
Trident Microsystems	PNX8491	1	?	?	?	PowerVR SGX531
WonderMedia	WM8850	1	40 nm	Yes	VFPv3	ARM Mali-400
WonderMedia	WM8880	2	40 nm	?	?	ARM Mali-400 MP2
WonderMedia	WM8950	1	40 nm	?	?	ARM Mali-400
WonderMedia	WM8980	2	40 nm	?	?	ARM Mali-400 MP2
Xilinx	Zynq-7000	2	28 nm	Yes	VFPv3	—
ZiiLABS	ZMS-20	?	?	Yes	VFPv3	ZiiLABS flexible Stemcell media processing

== See also ==
- ARM architecture
- List of ARM cores
- List of applications of ARM cores
- Comparison of ARMv8-A cores
- JTAG
