= Wishtel =

Indian manufacturing company

WishTel
- Type: Private
- Industry: IT Products
- Headquarters: Mumbai, India
- Key people: Milind Shah, CEO
- Products: IRA (tablet)
- Website: www.wishtel.com

WishTel is an Indian manufacturing company that produce various IT products, founded in Mumbai by Milind Shah. The manufacturing facilities are currently in Maharashtra and Gujarat.

WishTel is an Indian IT products manufacturing company. On 23 March 2012, it announced the launch of a range of low-cost tablet devices by the name of IRA. The company claims to bring cheap and efficient computing devices in the fields of education where the Indian Government has often made efforts with the OLPC initiative and the Aakash (tablet) project.

The company was also the second lowest bidder for the Aakash project where they lost to DataWind. The CEO of the company Milind Shah has also claimed that WishTel would be bidding for the Aakash 2 project which was announced by Kapil Sibal who is currently the minister of communications and information technology for India.

== IRA Tablets ==
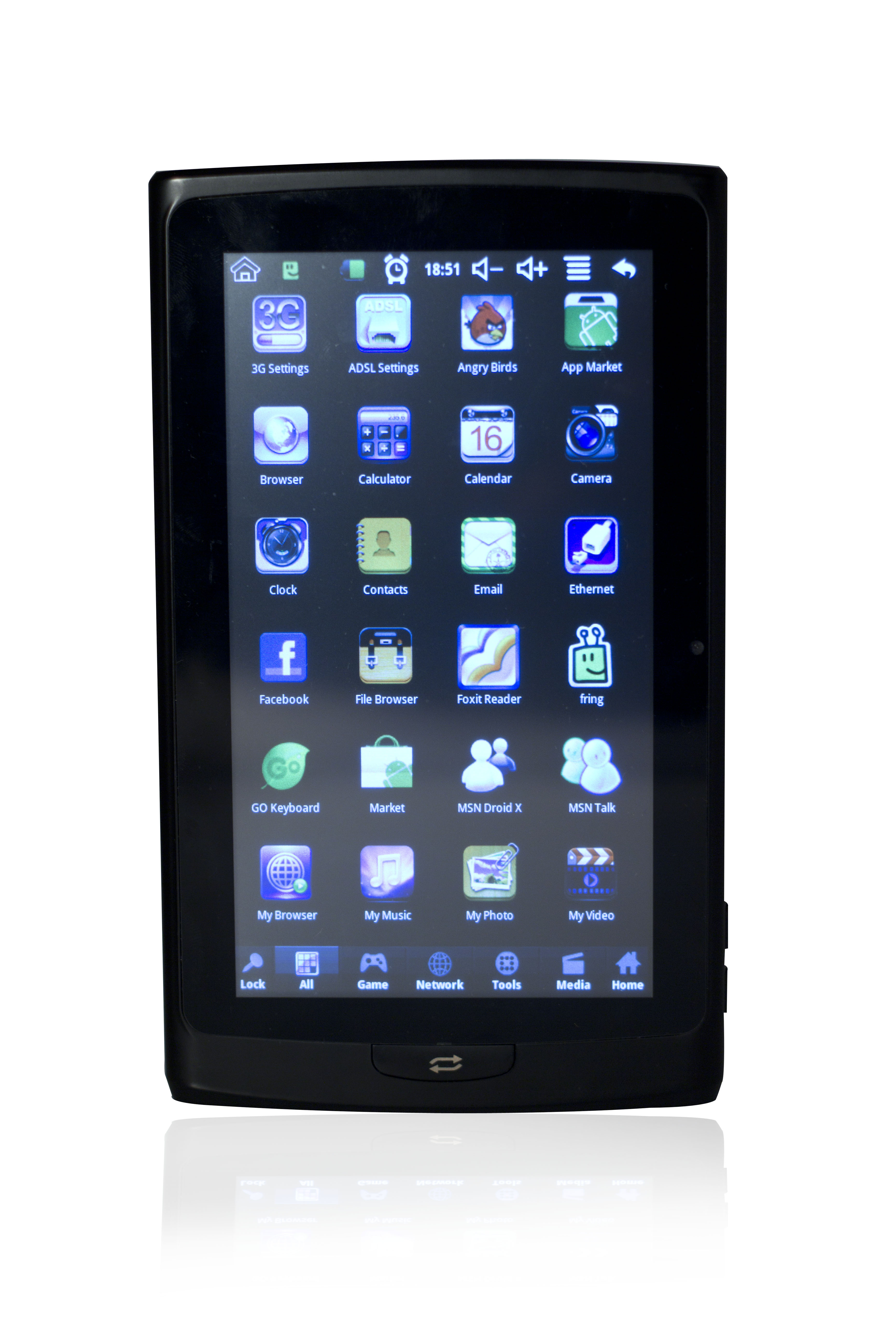
Wishtel IRA Thing Tablet.

The idea of producing these tablet computers is partly inspired by the fact that there is a big gap between technology and education, and partly by the introduction of another series of low-cost tablets – Aakash tablets – in 2010.

Wishtel designed its tablets according to the required specifications from Indian Institute of Technology Rajasthan under the National Mission on Education, and are being funded by the Ministry of Human Resource.

The seven-inch tablets would be the first such devices to support 23 Indian regional languages.
