= LG L9 =

The LG L9 is

a SoC for Smart TV devices made by LG Corp. Specifically, it was paired with the Google TV platform. It includes a dual-core ARM architecture CPU as well as a quad-core GPU.

LG also produced a phone called the LG Optimus L9, however it is not related to this SoC.

== Specs ==
Lg L9
Physical specifications
- Cores: 2

Architecture and classification
- Microarchitecture: ARM Cortex-A9

Support status
- Unsupported

- Dual core 1 GHz ARM Cortex-A9 MPCore
- Quad core ARM Mali-400MP
