= Google TV (2010–2014) =

Smart TV operating system

- Developer: Google and others
- OS family: Android; Unix-like (modified Linux kernel)
- Working state: No longer supported
- Source model: Open source with proprietary components
- Initial release: October 6, 2010; 16 years ago
- Marketing target: Smart TV platform
- Succeeded by: Android TV
- Official website: tv.google (Currently redirects to the continued version of Google TV)

Google TV was a smart TV operating system from Google co-developed by Intel, Sony and Logitech. It launched in October 2010 with official devices initially made by Sony and Logitech. Google TV integrated the Android 3.0/3.2 operating system and the Google Chrome web browser to create an interactive television overlay on top of existing online video sites to add a 10-foot user interface, for a smart TV experience.

Google TV's first generation devices were all based on x86 architecture processors and were created and commercialized by Sony and Logitech. The second generation of devices are all based on ARM architecture processors and with additional partners including LG, Samsung, Vizio and Hisense. In 2013, more second generation Google TV-supported devices were announced by new partners, including Hisense, Netgear, TCL, and Asus, some of which include 3D video support.

Google TV was succeeded in June 2014 by Android TV, a newer platform which shares closer ties with the Android platform and has a revamped user experience integrating with Knowledge Graph, and providing casting support from mobile devices. As of June 2014, the Google TV SDK is no longer available, ending any future software development for existing devices and effectively deprecating the platform. The "Google TV" branding has since been used as a replacement for Google Play Movies & TV, and to refer to a user interface used on newer Android TV devices (such as Chromecast with Google TV and Google TV Streamer).

== History ==
- 2010 March – Media outlets reported that the Google TV project was underway, although the partnering companies did not confirm their involvement in the venture until later.
- 2010 May 20 – The Google TV project was officially announced at the 2010 Google I/O conference on May 20. Google stated that the new platform would be incorporated directly into new high-definition television sets and Blu-ray Disc players by Sony, although set-top boxes would also be developed by Logitech. The company indicated that the new systems developed by Sony and Logitech would be powered by Intel Atom based CE4100 consumer electronics system-on-chip. It also stated that a "fully optimized" viewer experience would be available through the Dish Network, although the platform would operate through any provider.
- 2010 May – Sony announced that it would be releasing its Google-enabled Sony Internet TV product lineup in the fall of 2010, including standalone TV models and set-top units with integrated Blu-ray Disc drives.
- 2010 November 10 – Dish Network announced that its Google TV solution was available to customers. Dish Network's Google TV solution, which requires a DVR integration service, includes the Logitech Revue with Google TV, a small set-top box.
- 2010 December 15 – Google announces the first Google TV update, with some bug fixes and four major improvements: namely Netflix streaming catalog, Dual View, Remote Control App for Android Phones and Movies search results.
- 2011 May 10 – At Google I/O it is announced that Google TV devices will be updated to Android 3.1 Honeycomb, will have access to the Android Market, and have some application updates.
- 2011 June 18 – Google acquires SageTV, a home media software developer.
- 2011 August 26 – Google has announced Google TV would be officially released in Europe in January 2012.
- 2011 October 28 – Google TV starts the roll-out of Google TV 2.0, with the Android 3.1 operating system and access to the Market.
- 2012 January 8 – It is announced that the new generation of Google TV devices will run on a variety of ARM SoC designs. One of the key suppliers is Marvell with their Armada 1500 platform.
- 2012 January 10 – Sony Corporation plans to bring Google TV to Canada in Summer 2012. No exact released date has been announced. Sony marketing director, Stephane Labrousse has stated that Sony will start selling Google TV based products in Europe in September 2012.
- 2012 April 19 – Google updates the TV and Movies app to include social features
- 2012 June 25 – Sony plans to release Google TV in Europe in September 2012 with the network media player NSZ-GS7 and the Google TV-integrated Blu-ray player NSZ-GS9 where it will first be released in the UK.
- 2012 October 12 – Google video demo of Google TV version 3 is leaked. Version 3 features include an improved Primetime TV guide application, as well as a companion Android application. Voice based TV and web search for models that include a microphone. A Movies & TV Play Store application which will offer, for purchase, streaming video.
- 2013 January – Google TV version 3 begins to be rolled out to most Google TV devices.
- 2013 May 15 – Google announces that 2nd generation Google TV devices (using ARM CPUs) will be eligible to receive an update to Android 4.2.2 and the latest version of Android Chrome instead of Desktop Chrome.
- 2013 October 10 – Report suggests Google will rebrand Google TV to Android TV and that approximately one million Google TV devices are in use.
- 2013 October 11 – Google confirms Google TV version 4 will eventually receive native Chromecast like functionality.
- 2013 October 24 – LG televisions with Google TV begin to receive the Android 4.2.2 update.

== Features ==
Google TV leveraged many of Google's existing products. Google TV's operating system, a customized version of Android 3.0/3.2 designed for TV, provided the underlying foundation, allowing developers to create applications that extended the system's functionality. Google's Chrome browser provided a gateway to the Internet, allowing consumers to browse web sites and watch television in tandem. Consumers could access HBO, CNBC, and content from other providers through the Chrome browser. Android and Apple smartphones and tablet computers could be used as remote controls for Google TV. Google TV products shipped with wireless remote controls with a full QWERTY keypad. An update in November 2011 allowed access to Google Play and enabled search to find content from live TV, Netflix, YouTube, HBO GO, Amazon, and more.

Xyologic has compiled a list of the early Google TV apps with the largest number of installations. As of November 2012, the most installed apps were Napster, Pandora Radio and CNBC.

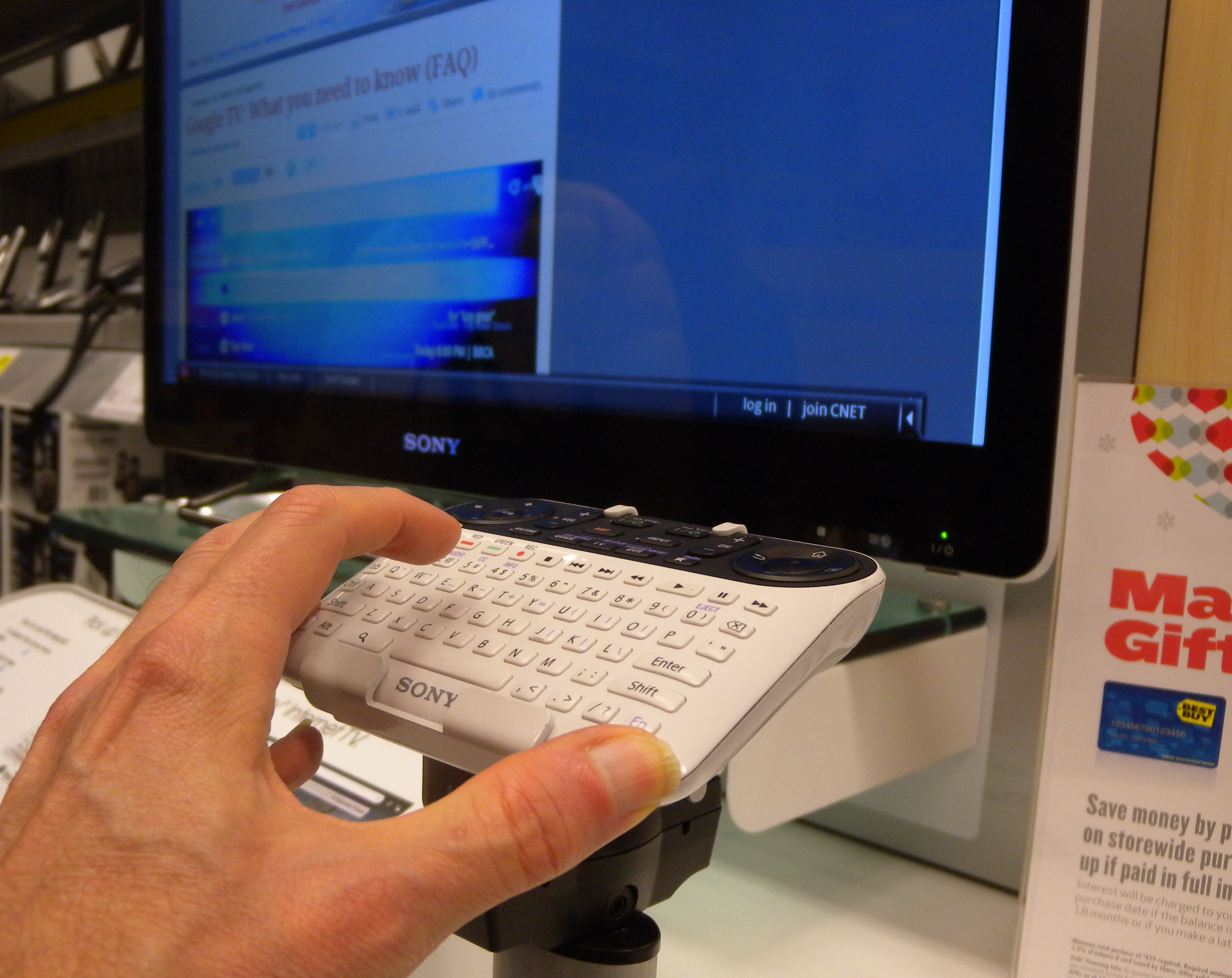
Sony Internet TV

== Partners ==
The Google TV platform was provided by Google to OEMs for incorporation into their consumer products. The first generation of consumer devices were produced by Logitech and Sony. The second generation of consumer devices were produced by Sony, LG (see LG L9 SoC), Vizio, Hisense, NetGear and Asus. The third generation of consumer devices was announced by LG at 2013 International CES, with the announcement of their TV models.

== Devices ==
=== First generation ===
Brand/Name	Model	Android version	Flash	Status	Announcement date	US release date	Discontinued date
Sony Internet TV – 24", 32", 40", and 46"	NSX-24GT1, NSX-32GT1, NSX-40GT1, and NSX-46GT1	3.2 Honeycomb	4 GB Flash NAND	Discontinued	October 12, 2010	October 2010	February 2012
Sony Internet TV Blu-ray Disc	NSZ-GT1	3.2 Honeycomb	Unknown	Discontinued	October 12, 2010	October 2010	February 2012
Logitech Revue	M/N: D-R0001, Y-R0014 – PN 970-000001	3.2 Honeycomb	Unknown	Discontinued	June 18, 2010	October 2010	November 2011

=== Second generation ===
Brand/Name	Model	Android version	Processor	RAM	Flash	USB ports	IR Blaster	Status	Announcement date	US release date	Discontinued date
Sony Internet Player with Google TV	NSZ-GS7	3.2 Honeycomb	Marvell Armada 1500(88de3100) 1.2 GHz dual-core processor, with a 750 MHz GPU	1 GB DDR3 Memory	8 GB Samsung Flash NAND – KLM8G2FEJA-A002	2	Yes	Discontinued	January 9, 2012	July 22, 2012	
LG SmartTV with GoogleTV (47" and 55")	47G2 and 55G2	4.2.2 Jelly Bean	LG L9					Discontinued	May 2012	May 30, 2012	
Vizio Co-Star	VAP430	3.2 Honeycomb	Marvell Armada 1500(88de3100) 1.2 GHz dual-core processor, with a 750 MHz GPU	1 GB DDR3 Memory	4 GB Samsung Flash NAND – K9GBG08U0A-SCBO	1	Yes	Discontinued	June 26, 2012	August 22, 2012	
Hisense Pulse	gx1200v	3.2 Honeycomb	Marvell Armada 1500(88de3100) 1.2 GHz dual-core processor, with a 750 MHz GPU	1 GB DDR3 Memory	4 GB Flash NAND	1	Yes	Discontinued	September 2012	December 20, 2012	
ASUS Cube	Cube	3.2 Honeycomb	Marvell Armada 1500(88DE3100) 1.2 GHz dual-core processor, with a 750 MHz GPU	1 GB DDR3 Memory	4 GB Flash NAND	2	Yes	Discontinued	January 7, 2013	April 24, 2013	
NETGEAR NeoTV Prime	GTV100	3.2 Honeycomb	Marvell Armada 1500(88DE3100) 1.2 GHz dual-core processor, with a 750 MHz GPU	1 GB DDR3 Memory	4 GB Flash NAND	1	Yes	Discontinued	January 7, 2013	January 9, 2013	

== Reviews ==
Date	Author	Publisher	Device generation	Comments
October 29, 2010	Nilay Patel	Engadget Blog	First generation	Remarked, "Google TV feels like an incomplete jumble of good ideas only half-realized, an unoptimized box of possibility that suffers under the weight of its own ambition and seemingly rushed holiday deadline."
November 13, 2010	Kevin Sintumuang	Wall Street Journal	First generation	review that "The potential is as big as, well, the Internet, but right now Google TV is a bit of a tease."
November 17, 2010	David Pogue	The New York Times	First generation	Said "This much is clear: Google TV may be interesting to technophiles, but it's not for average people." Concentrating more on the product's usefulness for finding and watching television shows than on its capabilities as an Internet appliance, he also expressed concern about the inconsistencies throughout the user interface as well as the fragmentation of Google TV.
July 28, 2010	Matt Burns	TechCrunch	First generation	Commentators were saying "Google TV is sinking" and that it was "on its last legs" as launch partner Logitech slashed the price of its Revue (from $249 to $99) to clear unsold inventory.
November 3, 2011	Matt Burns	Techcrunch	First generation	Some of the same commentators praised Google TV 2.0 as having a "brilliant interface" but still lacking "substance." Said "The latest Google TV, referred to as Google TV 2.0 throughout the rest of this review, is a star performer. It runs like a champ and it's clear that Google engineers paid close attention to criticism of version 1.0."
November 22, 2011	Russell Holly	Geek.com	First generation	
November 22, 2011	Brid-Aine Parnell	Theregister.co.uk	Second generation	
January 9, 2012	Jung-ah Lee	WSJ	Second generation	This article says that Samsung had plans to release Google TV based devices in the second half of 2012. Their target was high-end customers in the U.S. first.
June 26, 2012	Ben Drawbaugh	Engadget Blog	Second generation	
June 27, 2012	Marshal Rosenthal	Gadget Review	Second generation	It says: "The advantage of the Google experience is that much of what is going on is happening online — as you're accessing video, photos, looking at stuff that is not just locally based." The LG 55G2 product was rated in general as excellent.

== Competitors and controversies ==
Cable providers as well as content providers did not participate in the Google TV platform due to it allowing access through a web browser rather than authenticated apps which could enforce geolocation and international copyright restrictions. NBC, ABC, Fox, CBS/The CW, Hulu, and Viacom blocked Google TV enabled devices from accessing their web content through the platform's entire life. Of the cable and satellite providers, only Dish Network had embraced Google TV and promoted it by offering customers a discount on the Logitech Revue. In contrast, the Android TV ecosystem has all the major American television networks and streaming providers' apps.

In January 2014, Google filed a UDRP case against the owner of domain names androidtv.com and xbmcandroidtv.com. The domain names were owned by Exo Level, Inc. and were registered with GoDaddy in November 2006. In March 2014, Google's case was denied.

== Version history ==
=== Google TV version history details === Google TV version history details
Brand	Firmware Version	Build Number	Release date	Android Version	Devices Supported	Version Improvements
Sony	2.1	2010-10	2.1	Sony Internet TV devices NSZ-GT1, NSX-24GT1, NSX-32GT1, NSX-40GT1 and NSX-46GT1.	Original version.	
Sony	2.1 – Update 1	2011102306	2011-10-23	2.1	Sony Internet TV devices NSZ-GT1, NSX-24GT1, NSX-32GT1, NSX-40GT1 and NSX-46GT1.	
Logitech	3.1 update		2011-12-12	3.1	Logitech Revue	Updated to Android 3.1.
Sony	3.2	2012022201_WWV_ORSC.201202220101419	2012-03-06	3.1	Sony Internet TV devices NSZ-GT1, NSX-24GT1, NSX-32GT1, NSX-40GT1 and NSX-46GT1.	Improved stability and performance of the Android operating system. Update the system to Android 3.1 platform. Adds Blu-ray 3D support for the NSZ-GT1 device. Updates in Chrome and Flash.
Sony	3.2	2012052001_WWW_ORSC.2012050140935	2012-06-03	3.2	Sony Internet TV devices NSZ-GT1, NSX-24GT1, NSX-32GT1, NSX-40GT1 and NSX-46GT1.	Updated to Android 3.2 level. Chrome updates.
Logitech	3.2	KA2X-20120518.141456.user-b65871-p	2012-06-04	3.2	Logitech Revue.	Updated to Android 3.2 level. Netflix fixes, fix for keyboard controller pairing failures, Chrome updates.
Sony	3.2	REL02_NSZGS7_U2_1005_887_3790_20120628_URSC	2012-06-28	3.2	Sony NSZ-GS7 Network Media Player	
Sony	3.2	REL03_NSZGS7_U2_1104_4384_20120724_URSC_S67254	2012-08-03	3.2	Sony NSZ-GS7 Network Media Player	Added WPS2.0 function and support for the Media player / Socialife application.
Sony	3.2	2012080801_WWV_ORSC.20120808140935	2012-08-16	3.2	Sony Internet TV devices NSZ-GT1, NSX-24GT1, NSX-32GT1, NSX-40GT1 and NSX-46GT1.	
Logitech	3.2	KA2X-20121009.114346.user-b70199	2013-01-28	3.2	Logitech Revue.	Chrome updates, performance improvements, added Google Play Movies & TV application.
Vizio	4.6.0		2013-02-08		Vizio Costar	Performance improvements, voice control, YouTube updates, Primetime quick guide.
Sony	3.2	rel07_NZGGS7_U2_2010_8249_20130219	2013-02-19	3.2	Sony NSZ-GS7	Updates to Google TV OS, Adds "Voice Search", adds "Amazon Video", improves system stability.
Sony	3.2	REL08_NSZGS7_U2_2106_131390_20130406_URSC_S67254	2013-05-02	3.2	Sony NSZ-GS7	Adds the DLNA® feature, adds the 3D video playback function, adds the VUDU™ application.
Vizio	5.3	--	2013-05-08		Vizio Costar	Improved resource manager, support for additional apps.

== See also ==
- Google Home
- Home theater PC
