= List of Qualcomm Snapdragon systems on chips =

Smartphone electronics product line

Snapdragon
- Badge for the 7 Series

General information
- Launched: November 2007 (19 years ago)
- Designed by: Qualcomm

Physical specifications
- Cores: up to 18, as of 2025

Architecture and classification
- Application: Mobile SoC and 2-in-1 PC
- Microarchitecture: ARMv6, ARMv7-A, ARMv8-A, ARMv9-A
- Instruction set: ARM architecture family

The Snapdragon is a brand of systems on chips (SoCs) designed by Qualcomm and intended for mobile computing.

== Acronyms ==
System on chips released before the Snapdragon naming scheme are referred to only by their stock keeping unit (SKU) numbers. Some models were later given a Snapdragon product name. Earlier models are prefixed by an acronymic three-letter code; their full forms are as follows:

- QSC (Qualcomm Single Chip)
- MSM (Mobile Station Modem), denotes a chip with integrated cellular modem
- APQ (Application Processor Qualcomm), denotes a chip without modem

Model number	Fab	CPU	GPU (or Gfx Core)	Modem	Sampling availability
QSC1xxx
QSC1100	65 nm	ARM926EJ-S @ 96/128 MHz	No 3D, ARM 2D	CDMA2000 1x	Q4 2007
QSC1110	65 nm	ARM926EJ-S @ 96/128 MHz	No 3D, ARM 2D	CDMA2000 1x	Q4 2007
QSC1105	65 nm	ARM926EJ-S @ 211/316 MHz	No 3D, ARM 2D	CDMA2000 1x, GSM (Dual-Standby)	2010
QSC1215	65 nm	ARM926EJ-S @ 211/316 MHz	No 3D, ARM 2D	CDMA2000 1x, GSM (Dual-Standby)	Q3 2012
QSC6xxx
QSC6010		ARM926EJ-S	No 3D, ARM 2D	CDMA2000 1x	2006
QSC6020		ARM926EJ-S	No 3D, ARM 2D	CDMA2000 1x	2006
QSC6030		ARM926EJ-S	No 3D, ARM 2D	CDMA2000 1x	2006
QSC6055	65 nm	ARM926EJ-S @ 192 MHz	No 3D, ARM 2D	CDMA2000 1x	Q1 2007
QSC6065	65 nm	ARM926EJ-S @ 192 MHz	No 3D, ARM 2D	CDMA2000 1x	Q2 2007
QSC6075	65 nm	ARM926EJ-S @ 192/312 MHz	No 3D, ARM 2D	EV-DO Rel.0	Q2 2007
QSC6085	65 nm	ARM926EJ-S @ 192/312 MHz	No 3D, ARM 2D	EV-DO Rel.0/Rev.A	Q4 2007
QSC6155	45 nm	ARM1136JF-S @ 480 MHz with L2 cache	Stargate 3D, ARM 2D	CDMA2000 1x, GSM, GPRS	2008
QSC6165	45 nm	ARM1136JF-S @ 480 MHz with L2 cache	Stargate 3D, ARM 2D	CDMA2000 1x, GSM, GPRS	2008
QSC6175	45 nm	ARM1136JF-S @ 480 MHz with L2 cache	Stargate 3D, ARM 2D	EV-DO Rel.0	2008
QSC6185	45 nm	ARM1136JF-S @ 480 MHz with L2 cache	Stargate 3D, ARM 2D	EV-DO Rel.0/Rev.A	2008
QSC6195	45 nm	ARM1136JF-S @ 480 MHz with L2 cache	Stargate 3D, ARM 2D	EV-DO Rel.0/Rev.A/Rev.B	2008
QSC6240 (ESC6240)	65 nm	ARM926EJ-S @ 184/230 MHz	No 3D, ARM 2D	GSM, GPRS, EDGE, WCDMA	Q3 2007
QSC6245-1	65 nm	ARM926EJ-S @ 184/230 MHz	No 3D, ARM 2D	GSM, GPRS, EDGE, WCDMA	Q3 2007
QSC6260-1	65 nm	ARM926EJ-S @ 184/230 MHz	No 3D, ARM 2D	GSM, GPRS, EDGE, WCDMA, HSDPA	Q3 2007
QSC6270 (ESC6270)	65 nm	ARM926EJ-S @ 184/230 MHz	No 3D, ARM 2D	GSM, GPRS, EDGE, WCDMA, HSDPA	Q3 2007
QSC6295 (ESC6295)	45 nm	ARM1136JF-S @ 480 MHz with L2 cache	Stargate 3D, ARM 2D	GSM, GPRS, EDGE, WCDMA, HSPA+	2009
QSC6695	45 nm	ARM1136JF-S @ 480 MHz with L2 cache	Stargate 3D, ARM 2D	CDMA2000 1x	2009
QSC7230		ARM1136JF-S @ 600 MHz			
MSMx
MSM1	800 nm	80186 (x86-16)		CDMA IS-95 A (cdmaOne)	Q1 1993
MSM2	500 nm	80186 (x86-16)		CDMA IS-95 A (cdmaOne)	1995
MSM2xxx
MSM2300		80186 (x86-16)		CDMA IS-95 A/B (cdmaOne)	Q1 1997
MSM2310		80186 (x86-16)		CDMA IS-95 A/B (cdmaOne)	Q2 1998
MSM3xxx
MSM3000	350 nm	ARM7TDMI	No 3D, ARM 2D	CDMA IS-95 A/B (cdmaOne)	Q3 1998
MSM3100	350 nm	ARM7TDMI	No 3D, ARM 2D	CDMA IS-95 A/B (cdmaOne)	Q1 1999
MSM3300	350 nm	ARM7TDMI	No 3D, ARM 2D	CDMA IS-95 A/B (cdmaOne)	Q1 2000
MSM5xxx
MSM5000	180 nm	ARM7TDMI	No 3D, ARM 2D	CDMA2000 1x	Q3 2000
MSM5100	180 nm	ARM7TDMI @ 50 MHz	No 3D, ARM 2D	CDMA2000 1x, AMPS	Q1 2000
MSM5105	180 nm	ARM7TDMI @ 27 MHz	No 3D, ARM 2D	CDMA2000 1x, AMPS	Q3 2001
MSM5200	180 nm	ARM7TDMI @ 50 MHz	No 3D, ARM 2D	WCDMA	Q4 2000
MSM5500	180 nm	ARM7TDMI @ 50 MHz	No 3D, ARM 2D	CDMA2000 1x, EV-DO Rel.0	Q4 2000
MSM6xxx
MSM6000	250 nm	ARM7TDMI @ 20 MHz	No 3D, ARM 2D	CDMA2000 1x	Q1 2002
MSM6025	180 nm	ARM7TDMI @ 40 MHz	No 3D, ARM 2D	CDMA2000 1x	Q3 2003
MSM6050	180 nm	ARM7TDMI @ 40 MHz	No 3D, ARM 2D	CDMA2000 1x	Q1 2003
MSM6100	90 nm	ARM926EJ-S @ 146 MHz	ARM-DSP 3D, ARM 2D	CDMA2000 1x	Q4 2002
MSM6125	90 nm	ARM926EJ-S @ 146 MHz	ARM-DSP 3D, ARM 2D	CDMA2000 1x, GSM, GPRS	Q4 2005
MSM6150	130 nm	ARM926EJ-S @ 225 MHz	Defender2 3D, ARM 2D	CDMA2000 1x	Q3 2004
MSM6175	65 nm	ARM926EJ-S @ 270 MHz	Defender3 3D, ARM 2D	CDMA2000 1x	2006
MSM6200	180 nm	ARM7TDMI @ 40 MHz	No 3D, ARM 2D	GSM, GPRS, EDGE, WCDMA	Q3 2002
MSM6225	90 nm	ARM926EJ-S @ 146 MHz	No 3D, ARM 2D	GSM, GPRS, EDGE, WCDMA, HSDPA	Q2 2005
MSM6250	130 nm	ARM926EJ-S @ 146 MHz	ARM-DSP 3D, ARM 2D	GSM, GPRS, EDGE, WCDMA	Q3 2003
MSM6250A	90 nm	ARM926EJ-S @ 180 MHz	ARM-DSP 3D, ARM 2D	GSM, GPRS, EDGE, WCDMA	
MSM6245	65 nm	ARM926EJ-S @ 225 MHz	No 3D, ARM 2D	GSM, GPRS, EDGE, WCDMA	Q2 2006
MSM6246	65 nm	ARM926EJ-S @ 274 MHz	No 3D, ARM 2D	GSM, GPRS, EDGE, WCDMA, HSDPA	
MSM6255A	65 nm	ARM926EJ-S @ 225 MHz	No 3D, ARM 2D	GSM, GPRS, EDGE, WCDMA	Q2 2006
MSM6260	65 nm	ARM926EJ-S @ 225 MHz	ARM-DSP 3D, ARM 2D	GSM, GPRS, EDGE, WCDMA, HSDPA	
MSM6275	90 nm	ARM926EJ-S @ 225 MHz	Defender2 3D, ARM 2D	GSM, GPRS, EDGE, WCDMA, HSDPA	Q4 2004
MSM6280	90 nm	ARM926EJ-S @ 274 MHz	Defender2 3D, ARM 2D	GSM, GPRS, EDGE, WCDMA, HSDPA	Q3 2005
MSM6280A		ARM926EJ-S @ 274 MHz	Stargate 3D, ARM 2D	GSM, GPRS, EDGE, WCDMA, HSDPA	2007
MSM6290	65 nm	ARM926EJ-S @ 300 MHz	Stargate 3D, ARM 2D	GSM, GPRS, EDGE, WCDMA, HSDPA, HSUPA	2009
MSM6300	90 nm	ARM926EJ-S	No 3D, ARM 2D	CDMA2000 1x, GSM, GPRS	Q3 2002
MSM6500	130 nm	ARM926EJ-S @ 146 MHz	ARM-DSP 3D, ARM 2D	CDMA2000 1x, EV-DO Rel.0, GSM, GPRS	2002
MSM6550	130 nm	ARM926EJ-S @ 225 MHz	Defender2 3D, ARM 2D	CDMA2000 1x, EV-DO Rel.0, GSM, GPRS	Q3 2004
MSM6550A	90 nm	ARM926EJ-S @ 225 MHz	Defender2 3D, ARM 2D	CDMA2000 1x, EV-DO Rel.0, GSM, GPRS	
MSM6575	65 nm	ARM926EJ-S @ 270 MHz	Defender3 3D, ARM 2D	CDMA2000 1x, EV-DO Rel.0, GSM, GPRS	2006
MSM6800	130 nm	ARM926EJ-S @ 270 MHz	Defender3 3D, ARM 2D	CDMA2000 1x, EV-DO Rel.0/Rev.A, GSM, GPRS	Q2 2006
MSM6800A	90 nm	ARM926EJ-S @ 270 MHz	Defender3 3D, ARM 2D	CDMA2000 1x, EV-DO Rel.0/Rev.A, GSM, GPRS	2007
MSM7xxx
MSM7200	90 nm	ARM1136J-S @ 400 MHz	Imageon 2D, 3D; Q3Dimension (Adreno 130)	GSM, GPRS, EDGE, WCDMA, HSDPA, HSUPA	2006
MSM7200A	90 nm	ARM1136J-S @ 528 MHz	Imageon 2D, 3D; Q3Dimension (Adreno 130)	GSM, GPRS, EDGE, WCDMA, HSDPA, HSUPA	Q1 2007
MSM7201	90 nm	ARM1136JF-S @ 528 MHz	Imageon 2D, 3D; Q3Dimension (Adreno 130)	GSM, GPRS, EDGE, WCDMA, HSDPA, HSUPA	2008
MSM7201A	65 nm	ARM1136JF-S @ 528 MHz	Imageon 2D, 3D; Q3Dimension (Adreno 130)	GSM, GPRS, EDGE, WCDMA, HSDPA, HSUPA	2008
MSM7500	90 nm	ARM1136JF-S @ 528 MHz	Imageon 2D, 3D; Q3Dimension (Adreno 130)	CDMA2000 1x, EV-DO Rel.0/Rev.A	2006
MSM7500A	65 nm	ARM1136JF-S @ 528 MHz	Imageon 2D, 3D; Q3Dimension (Adreno 130)	CDMA2000 1x, EV-DO Rel.0/Rev.A	Q4 2007
MSM7600	90 nm	ARM1136J-S @ 528 MHz	Imageon 2D, 3D; Q3Dimension (Adreno 130)	GSM, GPRS, EDGE, WCDMA, HSDPA, HSUPA, CDMA2000 1x, EV-DO Rel.0/Rev.A	Q1 2007
MSM7600A	65 nm	ARM1136J-S @ 528 MHz	Imageon 2D, 3D; Q3Dimension (Adreno 130)	GSM, GPRS, EDGE, WCDMA, HSDPA, HSUPA, CDMA2000 1x, EV-DO Rel.0/Rev.A	Q1 2007
MSM7850			LT 3D, LT 2D	CDMA2000 1x, EV-DO Rel.0/Rev.A/Rev.B	2008

== Snapdragon S series ==
=== Snapdragon S1 ===
Features of the Snapdragon S1 series
Snapdragon S1 notable features over its predecessor (MSM7xxx):
- CPU features
  - 1 core up to 1 GHz Scorpion or Cortex-A5 or ARM11
  - Up to 256K L2 cache
  - Up to 32K+32K L1 cache
- GPU features
  - Adreno 200 (from Software rendered or Adreno 130)
    - OpenGL ES 1.1
    - OpenVG 1.0
    - Direct3D Mobile
    - Unified shader model 5-way VLIW
- DSP features
  - Hexagon QDSP5 at 350 MHz or Hexagon QDSP6 600 MHz
- ISP features
  - Up to 12 MP camera
- Modem and Wireless features
  - External Bluetooth 4.0 or external Bluetooth 2.0/2.1 on some models
- 45 or 65 nm manufacturing technology

Model number	Fab	CPU (Core/Freq)	GPU	DSP	ISP	Memory technology	Modem	Connectivity	Sampling availability
MSM7225	65 nm	1 core up to 528 MHz ARM11 (ARMv6): 16K+16K L1, no L2 cache	Software- rendered 2D support (HVGA)	Hexagon QDSP5 320 MHz	Up to 5 MP camera	LPDDR Single-channel 166 MHz (1.33 GB/s)	UMTS (HSPA); GSM (GPRS, EDGE)	Bluetooth 2.1 (external BTS4025); 802.11b/g/n (external WCN1314); gpsOne Gen 7; USB 2.0	2007
MSM7625	65 nm	1 core up to 528 MHz ARM11 (ARMv6): 16K+16K L1, no L2 cache	Software- rendered 2D support (HVGA)	Hexagon QDSP5 320 MHz	Up to 5 MP camera	LPDDR Single-channel 166 MHz (1.33 GB/s)	CDMA (1× Rev. A, 1×EV-DO Rev. A); UMTS; GSM	Bluetooth 2.1 (external BTS4025); 802.11b/g/n (external WCN1314); gpsOne Gen 7; USB 2.0	2007
MSM7227	65 nm	1 core up to 800 MHz ARM11 (ARMv6): 16K+16K L1, 256K L2 cache	Adreno 200 226 MHz (FWVGA)	Hexagon QDSP5 320 MHz	Up to 8 MP camera	LPDDR Single-channel 166 MHz (1.33 GB/s)	UMTS; GSM	Bluetooth 2.1 (external BTS4025); 802.11b/g/n (external WCN1312); gpsOne Gen 7; USB 2.0	2008
MSM7627	65 nm	1 core up to 800 MHz ARM11 (ARMv6): 16K+16K L1, 256K L2 cache	Adreno 200 226 MHz (FWVGA)	Hexagon QDSP5 320 MHz	Up to 8 MP camera	LPDDR Single-channel 166 MHz (1.33 GB/s)	CDMA, UMTS; GSM	Bluetooth 2.1 (external BTS4025); 802.11b/g/n (external WCN1312); gpsOne Gen 7; USB 2.0	2008
MSM7225A	45 nm	1 core up to 800 MHz Cortex-A5 (ARMv7): 32K+32K L1, 256K L2 cache	Adreno 200 245 MHz (HVGA)	Hexagon QDSP5 350 MHz	Up to 5 MP camera	LPDDR Single-channel 200 MHz (1.6 GB/s)	UMTS (HSDPA, HSUPA, W-CDMA), MBMS; GSM	Bluetooth 4.0 (external WCN2243); 802.11b/g/n (external AR6003/5, WCN1314); gpsOne Gen 7; USB 2.0	Q4 2011
MSM7625A	45 nm	1 core up to 800 MHz Cortex-A5 (ARMv7): 32K+32K L1, 256K L2 cache	Adreno 200 245 MHz (HVGA)	Hexagon QDSP5 350 MHz	Up to 5 MP camera	LPDDR Single-channel 200 MHz (1.6 GB/s)	CDMA2000 (1×RTT, 1×EV-DO Rel.0/Rev.A/Rev.B, 1×EV-DO MC Rev.A); UMTS, MBMS; GSM	Bluetooth 4.0 (external WCN2243); 802.11b/g/n (external AR6003/5, WCN1314); gpsOne Gen 7; USB 2.0	Q4 2011
MSM7227A	45 nm	1 core up to 1.0 GHz Cortex-A5 (ARMv7): 32K+32K L1, 256K L2 cache	Adreno 200 245 MHz (FWVGA)	Hexagon QDSP5 350 MHz	Up to 8 MP camera	LPDDR Single-channel 200 MHz (1.6 GB/s)	UMTS, MBMS; GSM	Bluetooth 4.0 (external WCN2243); 802.11b/g/n (external AR6003/5, WCN1314); gpsOne Gen 7; USB 2.0	Q4 2011
MSM7627A	45 nm	1 core up to 1.0 GHz Cortex-A5 (ARMv7): 32K+32K L1, 256K L2 cache	Adreno 200 245 MHz (FWVGA)	Hexagon QDSP5 350 MHz	Up to 8 MP camera	LPDDR Single-channel 200 MHz (1.6 GB/s)	CDMA2000, UMTS, MBMS; GSM	Bluetooth 4.0 (external WCN2243); 802.11b/g/n (external AR6003/5, WCN1314); gpsOne Gen 7; USB 2.0	Q4 2011
MSM7225AB	45 nm	1 core up to 1.0 GHz Cortex-A5 (ARMv7): 32K+32K L1, 256K L2 cache	Adreno 200 245 MHz (FWVGA)	Hexagon QDSP5 350 MHz	Up to 8 MP camera	LPDDR Single-channel 200 MHz (1.6 GB/s)	UMTS: up to 7.2 Mbit/s, MBMS; GSM	Bluetooth 4.0 (external WCN2243); 802.11b/g/n (external AR6003/5, WCN1314); gpsOne Gen 7; USB 2.0	
QSD8250	65 nm	1 core up to 1.0 GHz Scorpion (ARMv7): 32K+32K L1, 256K L2 cache	Adreno 200 226 MHz (WXGA)	Hexagon QDSP6 600 MHz	Up to 12 MP camera	LPDDR Single-channel 400 MHz	UMTS, MBMS; GSM	Bluetooth 2.1 (external BTS4025); 802.11b/g/n (external AR6003); gpsOne Gen 7; USB 2.0	Q4 2008
QSD8650	65 nm	1 core up to 1.0 GHz Scorpion (ARMv7): 32K+32K L1, 256K L2 cache	Adreno 200 226 MHz (WXGA)	Hexagon QDSP6 600 MHz	Up to 12 MP camera	LPDDR Single-channel 400 MHz	CDMA2000, UMTS, MBMS; GSM	Bluetooth 2.1 (external BTS4025); 802.11b/g/n (external AR6003); gpsOne Gen 7; USB 2.0	Q4 2008

=== Snapdragon S2 ===
Features of the Snapdragon S2 series
Snapdragon S2 notable features over its predecessor (Snapdragon S1):
- CPU feature
  - 1 core up to 1.5 GHz Scorpion
  - ARMv7 (from ARMv6 on some model)
  - Up to 384K L2
- GPU features
  - Adreno 205 (from Software rendered or Adreno 200)
    - Up to 266 MHz
    - Up to 2 times faster than Adreno 200
    - up to ×2 relative performance on OpenGL ES 2.0 from Adreno 200
    - Up to XGA
    - OpenGL ES 2.0
    - SVGT 1.2
    - OpenVG 1.1
    - Direct Draw
    - GDI
    - Concurrent CPU, DSP, graphics and MDP
- Memory features
  - Up to LPDDR2 32-bit dual-channel 333 MHz (5.3 GB/s)
- DSP features
  - Hexagon QDSP5 at 256 MHz
- 45 nm manufacturing technology
- 904 pins

Model number	Fab	CPU (ARMv7)	GPU	DSP	ISP	Memory technology	Modem	Connectivity	Sampling availability
MSM7230	45 nm	1 core up to 800 MHz Scorpion: 32K+32K L1, 256K L2	Adreno 205 266 MHz (XGA)	Hexagon QDSP5 256 MHz	Up to 12 MP camera	LPDDR2 32-bit dual-channel 333 MHz (5.3 GB/s)	GSM, GPRS, W-CDMA, UMTS, EDGE, MBMS, HSDPA, HSUPA, HSPA+	Bluetooth 4.0 (external WCN2243) or Bluetooth 3.0 (external QTR8x00); 802.11b/g/n (external WCN1314); gpsOne Gen 8 with Glonass; USB 2.0	Q2 2010
MSM7630	45 nm	1 core up to 800 MHz Scorpion: 32K+32K L1, 256K L2	Adreno 205 266 MHz (XGA)	Hexagon QDSP5 256 MHz	Up to 12 MP camera	LPDDR2 32-bit dual-channel 333 MHz (5.3 GB/s)	CDMA2000 (1×Adv, 1×EV-DO Rel. 0/Rev. A/Rev. B, 1×EV-DO MC Rev.A, SV-DO); UMTS, MBMS; GSM	Bluetooth 4.0 (external WCN2243) or Bluetooth 3.0 (external QTR8x00); 802.11b/g/n (external WCN1314); gpsOne Gen 8 with Glonass; USB 2.0	Q2 2010
APQ8055	45 nm	1 core up to 1.4 GHz Scorpion: 32K+32K L1, 384K L2	Adreno 205 266 MHz (XGA)	Hexagon QDSP5 256 MHz	Up to 12 MP camera	LPDDR2 32-bit dual-channel 333 MHz (5.3 GB/s)	—N/a	Bluetooth 4.0 (external WCN2243) or Bluetooth 3.0 (external QTR8x00); 802.11b/g/n (external WCN1314); gpsOne Gen 8 with Glonass; USB 2.0	Q2 2010
MSM8255	45 nm	1 core up to 1.0 GHz Scorpion: 32K+32K L1, 384K L2	Adreno 205 266 MHz (XGA)	Hexagon QDSP5 256 MHz	Up to 12 MP camera	LPDDR2 32-bit dual-channel 333 MHz (5.3 GB/s)	UMTS, MBMS; GSM	Bluetooth 4.0 (external WCN2243) or Bluetooth 3.0 (external QTR8x00); 802.11b/g/n (external WCN1314); gpsOne Gen 8 with Glonass; USB 2.0	Q2 2010
MSM8655	45 nm	1 core up to 1.0 GHz Scorpion: 32K+32K L1, 384K L2	Adreno 205 266 MHz (XGA)	Hexagon QDSP5 256 MHz	Up to 12 MP camera	LPDDR2 32-bit dual-channel 333 MHz (5.3 GB/s)	CDMA2000, UMTS, MBMS; GSM	Bluetooth 4.0 (external WCN2243) or Bluetooth 3.0 (external QTR8x00); 802.11b/g/n (external WCN1314); gpsOne Gen 8 with Glonass; USB 2.0	Q2 2010
MSM8255T	45 nm	1 core up to 1.5 GHz Scorpion: 32K+32K L1, 384K L2	Adreno 205 266 MHz (XGA)	Hexagon QDSP5 256 MHz	Up to 12 MP camera	LPDDR2 32-bit dual-channel 333 MHz (5.3 GB/s)	UMTS, MBMS; GSM	Bluetooth 4.0 (external WCN2243) or Bluetooth 3.0 (external QTR8x00); 802.11b/g/n (external WCN1314); gpsOne Gen 8 with Glonass; USB 2.0	Q2 2010
MSM8655T	45 nm	1 core up to 1.5 GHz Scorpion: 32K+32K L1, 384K L2	Adreno 205 266 MHz (XGA)	Hexagon QDSP5 256 MHz	Up to 12 MP camera	LPDDR2 32-bit dual-channel 333 MHz (5.3 GB/s)	CDMA2000, UMTS, MBMS; GSM	Bluetooth 4.0 (external WCN2243) or Bluetooth 3.0 (external QTR8x00); 802.11b/g/n (external WCN1314); gpsOne Gen 8 with Glonass; USB 2.0	Q2 2010

=== Snapdragon S3 ===
Features of the Snapdragon S3 series
Snapdragon S3 notable features over its predecessor (Snapdragon S2):
- CPU feature
  - 2 cores up to 1.7 GHz Scorpion
  - 512 KB L2
- GPU features
  - Adreno 220
    - Up to 4 times faster than Adreno 200
    - up to ×5 relative performance on OpenGL ES 2.0 from Adreno 200
    - EGL 1.3 (from 1.2)
    - 2× larger L2 cache (512 KB from 256 KB)
    - Up to WXGA+
- DSP features
  - Hexagon QDSP6 at 400 MHz (from Hexagon QDSP5 at 256 MHz)
- ISP features
  - Up to 16 MP camera (from 12 MP)
- 45 nm manufacturing technology

Model number	Fab	CPU (ARMv7)	GPU	DSP	ISP	Memory technology	Modem	Connectivity	Sampling availability
APQ8060	45 nm	2 cores up to 1.7 GHz Scorpion: 512 KB L2	Adreno 220 266 MHz (WXGA+)	Hexagon QDSP6 400 MHz	Up to 16 MP camera	LPDDR2 Single- channel 333 MHz (2.67 GB/s)	—N/a	Bluetooth 4.0 (external WCN2243); 802.11b/g/n (external WCN1314); gpsOne Gen 8 with Glonass; USB 2.0	2011
MSM8260	45 nm	2 cores up to 1.7 GHz Scorpion: 512 KB L2	Adreno 220 266 MHz (WXGA+)	Hexagon QDSP6 400 MHz	Up to 16 MP camera	LPDDR2 Single- channel 333 MHz (2.67 GB/s)	GSM, GPRS, W-CDMA, UMTS, HSDPA, HSUPA, HSPA+, EDGE, MBMS	Bluetooth 4.0 (external WCN2243); 802.11b/g/n (external WCN1314); gpsOne Gen 8 with Glonass; USB 2.0	Q3 2010
MSM8660	45 nm	2 cores up to 1.7 GHz Scorpion: 512 KB L2	Adreno 220 266 MHz (WXGA+)	Hexagon QDSP6 400 MHz	Up to 16 MP camera	LPDDR2 Single- channel 333 MHz (2.67 GB/s)	CDMA2000 (1×Adv, 1×EV-DO Rel. 0/Rev. A/Rev. B, 1×EV-DO MC Rev.A); UMTS, MBMS; GSM	Bluetooth 4.0 (external WCN2243); 802.11b/g/n (external WCN1314); gpsOne Gen 8 with Glonass; USB 2.0	Q3 2010

=== Snapdragon S4 ===
Snapdragon S4 was offered in three models: S4 Play for budget and entry-level devices, S4 Plus for mid-range devices and S4 Pro for high-end devices. It was launched in 2012. The Snapdragon S4 were succeeded by the Snapdragon 200/400 series (S4 Play) and 600/800 series (S4 Plus and S4 Pro).

==== Snapdragon S4 Play ====
Model number	Fab	CPU (ARMv7)	GPU	DSP	ISP	Memory technology	Modem	Connectivity	Sampling availability
MSM8225	45 nm	2 cores up to 1.2 GHz Cortex-A5: 2x 32K+32K L1, 512K L2	Adreno 203 320 MHz (FWVGA)	Hexagon	Up to 8 MP camera	LPDDR2 Single-channel 300 MHz	UMTS (HSPA); GSM (GPRS, EDGE)	Bluetooth 3.0 (external); 802.11b/g/n 2.4 GHz (external); GPS: IZat Gen 7; USB 2.0	1H 2012
MSM8625	45 nm	2 cores up to 1.2 GHz Cortex-A5: 2x 32K+32K L1, 512K L2	Adreno 203 320 MHz (FWVGA)	Hexagon	Up to 8 MP camera	LPDDR2 Single-channel 300 MHz	CDMA (1×Rev. A, 1×EV-DO Rev. A/B); UMTS; GSM	Bluetooth 3.0 (external); 802.11b/g/n 2.4 GHz (external); GPS: IZat Gen 7; USB 2.0	1H 2012

==== Snapdragon S4 Plus ====
Features of the Snapdragon S4 Plus series
Snapdragon S4 Plus notable features over its predecessor (Snapdragon S3):
- CPU features
  - 2x cores up to 1.7 GHz Krait 200
  - 4+4 KB L0, 16+16 KB L1, 1 MB L2
  - Out of Order Execution (from Partial Out of Order Execution on Scorpion)
- GPU features
  - Adreno 225
    - Up to 1080p screen
    - Up to 6 times faster than Adreno 200
    - Up to 32 ALU
    - Direct3D feature level 9.0 (from 9.0)
    - up to ×7.5 relative performance on OpenGL ES 2.0 from Adreno 200
  - Adreno 305
    - Up to 1080p screen (on 400 MHz)
    - Up to 720p screen (on 320 MHz)
    - Up to 24 ALU (from 32 on S3)
    - Unified shader model Scalar instruction set (from unified shader model 5-way VLIW)
    - up to ×8 relative performance on OpenGL ES 2.0 from Adreno 200
- DSP features
  - Up to 20 MP or 13.5 MP camera
- ISP features
  - Hexagon QDSP6
- Modem and Wireless features
  - Integrated Bluetooth 4.0
  - IZat Gen8A (from IZat Gen 7)
- 28 nm manufacturing technology

Model number	Fab	CPU (ARMv7)	GPU	DSP	ISP	Memory technology	Modem	Connectivity	Sampling availability
MSM8227	28 nm	2 cores up to 1.0 GHz Krait: 4+4 KB L0, 16+16 KB L1, 1 MB L2	Adreno 305 320 MHz (FWVGA / 720p)	Hexagon QDSP6	Unknown	LPDDR2 Single-channel 400 MHz	GSM (GPRS, EDGE), UMTS (DC-HSPA+, TD-SCDMA)	Bluetooth 4.0; 802.11b/g/n (2.4/5 GHz); GPS: IZat Gen 8A; USB 2.0	2H 2012
MSM8627	28 nm	2 cores up to 1.0 GHz Krait: 4+4 KB L0, 16+16 KB L1, 1 MB L2	Adreno 305 320 MHz (FWVGA / 720p)	Hexagon QDSP6	Unknown	LPDDR2 Single-channel 400 MHz	CDMA (1×Rev.A, 1×EV-DO Rev.A/B, SVDO-DB); UMTS; GSM	Bluetooth 4.0; 802.11b/g/n (2.4/5 GHz); GPS: IZat Gen 8A; USB 2.0	2H 2012
APQ8030	28 nm	2 cores up to 1.2 GHz Krait: 4+4 KB L0, 16+16 KB L1, 1 MB L2	Adreno 305 400 MHz (qHD / 1080p)	Hexagon QDSP6	Up to 13.5 MP camera	LPDDR2 Single-channel 533 MHz	—N/a .	Bluetooth 4.0; 802.11b/g/n (2.4/5 GHz); GPS: IZat Gen 8A; USB 2.0	3Q 2012
MSM8230	28 nm	2 cores up to 1.2 GHz Krait: 4+4 KB L0, 16+16 KB L1, 1 MB L2	Adreno 305 400 MHz (qHD / 1080p)	Hexagon QDSP6	Up to 13.5 MP camera	LPDDR2 Single-channel 533 MHz	UMTS; GSM .	Bluetooth 4.0; 802.11b/g/n (2.4/5 GHz); GPS: IZat Gen 8A; USB 2.0	3Q 2012
MSM8630	28 nm	2 cores up to 1.2 GHz Krait: 4+4 KB L0, 16+16 KB L1, 1 MB L2	Adreno 305 400 MHz (qHD / 1080p)	Hexagon QDSP6	Up to 13.5 MP camera	LPDDR2 Single-channel 533 MHz	CDMA, UMTS; GSM	Bluetooth 4.0; 802.11b/g/n (2.4/5 GHz); GPS: IZat Gen 8A; USB 2.0	3Q 2012
MSM8930	28 nm	2 cores up to 1.2 GHz Krait: 4+4 KB L0, 16+16 KB L1, 1 MB L2	Adreno 305 400 MHz (qHD / 1080p)	Hexagon QDSP6	Up to 13.5 MP camera	LPDDR2 Single-channel 533 MHz	World Mode (LTE FDD/TDD Cat 3, SVLTE-DB, EGAL; CDMA, UMTS; GSM)	Bluetooth 4.0; 802.11b/g/n (2.4/5 GHz); GPS: IZat Gen 8A; USB 2.0	3Q 2012
APQ8060A	28 nm	2 cores up to 1.5 GHz Krait: 4+4 KB L0, 16+16 KB L1, 1 MB L2	Adreno 225 400 MHz (WUXGA / 1080p)	Hexagon QDSP6	Up to 20 MP camera	LPDDR2 Dual-channel 500 MHz	—N/a .	Bluetooth 4.0; 802.11b/g/n (2.4/5 GHz); GPS: IZat Gen 8A; USB 2.0	2H 2012
MSM8260A	28 nm	2 cores up to 1.5 GHz Krait: 4+4 KB L0, 16+16 KB L1, 1 MB L2	Adreno 225 400 MHz (WUXGA / 1080p)	Hexagon QDSP6	Up to 20 MP camera	LPDDR2 Dual-channel 500 MHz	UMTS; GSM	Bluetooth 4.0; 802.11b/g/n (2.4/5 GHz); GPS: IZat Gen 8A; USB 2.0	Q1 2012
MSM8660A	28 nm	2 cores up to 1.5 GHz Krait: 4+4 KB L0, 16+16 KB L1, 1 MB L2	Adreno 225 400 MHz (WUXGA / 1080p)	Hexagon QDSP6	Up to 20 MP camera	LPDDR2 Dual-channel 500 MHz	CDMA, UMTS; GSM	Bluetooth 4.0; 802.11b/g/n (2.4/5 GHz); GPS: IZat Gen 8A; USB 2.0	Q1 2012
MSM8960	28 nm	2 cores up to 1.5 GHz Krait: 4+4 KB L0, 16+16 KB L1, 1 MB L2	Adreno 225 400 MHz (WUXGA / 1080p)	Hexagon QDSP6	Up to 20 MP camera	LPDDR2 Dual-channel 500 MHz	World Mode (LTE Cat 3)	Bluetooth 4.0; 802.11b/g/n (2.4/5 GHz); GPS: IZat Gen 8A; USB 2.0	Q1 2012

==== Snapdragon S4 Pro and S4 Prime (2012) ====
Features of the Snapdragon S4 Pro series
Snapdragon S4 Pro notable features over its predecessor (Snapdragon S4 Play):
- CPU features
  - up to 2 cores up to 1.7 GHz Krait 200 on to Snapdragon S4 Pro
  - up to 4 cores up to 1.5 GHz Krait 200 on to Snapdragon S4 Prime
  - 4+4 KB L0, 16+16 KB L1, 1 MB L2
- GPU features
  - Adreno 320
    - Support OpenGL ES 3.0
    - Up to 1080p screen
    - Up to 64 ALU (from 32 on S4 plus)
    - up to ×23 relative performance on OpenGL ES 2.0 from Adreno 200
- DSP features
  - Hexagon QDSP6
- ISP features
  - Up to 20 MP camera
- Modem and Wireless features
  - LTE FDD/TDD Cat 3 or external on some models
- 28 nm LP manufacturing technology
- Up to eMMC 4.4/4.41

Model number	Fab	CPU (ARMv7)	GPU	DSP	ISP	Memory technology	Modem	Connectivity	Sampling availability
MSM8260A Pro	28 nm (TSMC 28LP)	2 cores up to 1.7 GHz Krait 300: 4+4 KB L0, 16+16 KB L1, 1 MB L2	Adreno 320 400 MHz (WUXGA / 1080p)	Hexagon QDSP6	Up to 20 MP camera	LPDDR2 Dual-channel 500 MHz	GSM (GPRS, EDGE), UMTS (DC-HSPA+, TD-SCDMA)	Bluetooth 4.0; 802.11b/g/n (2.4/5 GHz); GPS: IZat Gen8A; USB 2.0	
MSM8960T	28 nm (TSMC 28LP)	2 cores up to 1.7 GHz Krait 300: 4+4 KB L0, 16+16 KB L1, 1 MB L2	Adreno 320 400 MHz (WUXGA / 1080p)	Hexagon QDSP6	Up to 20 MP camera	LPDDR2 Dual-channel 500 MHz	World Mode (LTE FDD/TDD Cat 3, SVLTE-DB, EGAL; CDMA: 1× Adv., 1× EV-DO Rev. A/B; UMTS; GSM)	Bluetooth 4.0; 802.11b/g/n (2.4/5 GHz); GPS: IZat Gen8A; USB 2.0	Q2 2012
MSM8960T Pro (MSM8960AB)	28 nm (TSMC 28LP)	2 cores up to 1.7 GHz Krait 300: 4+4 KB L0, 16+16 KB L1, 1 MB L2	Adreno 320 400 MHz (WUXGA / 1080p)	Hexagon QDSP6	Up to 20 MP camera	LPDDR2 Dual-channel 500 MHz	World Mode (LTE FDD/TDD Cat 3, SVLTE-DB, EGAL; CDMA: 1× Adv., 1× EV-DO Rev. A/B; UMTS; GSM)	Bluetooth 4.0; 802.11b/g/n (2.4/5 GHz); GPS: IZat Gen8A; USB 2.0	
MSM8960DT	28 nm (TSMC 28LP)	2 cores up to 1.7 GHz Krait 300: (Note: Natural language processor and contextual processor) 4+4 KB L0, 16+16 KB L1, 1 MB L2	Adreno 320 400 MHz (WUXGA / 1080p)	Hexagon QDSP6	Up to 20 MP camera	LPDDR2 Dual-channel 500 MHz	World Mode (LTE FDD/TDD Cat 3, SVLTE-DB, EGAL; CDMA: 1× Adv., 1× EV-DO Rev. A/B; UMTS; GSM)	Bluetooth 4.0; 802.11b/g/n (2.4/5 GHz); GPS: IZat Gen8A; USB 2.0	Q3 2013
APQ8064	28 nm (TSMC 28LP)	4 cores up to 1.5 GHz Krait: 4+4 KB L0, 16+16 KB L1, 2 MB L2	Adreno 320 400 MHz (QXGA / 1080p)	Hexagon QDSP6	Up to 20 MP camera	LPDDR2 Dual-channel 533 MHz	External	Bluetooth 4.0; 802.11b/g/n (2.4/5 GHz); GPS: IZat Gen8A; USB 2.0	2012

== Snapdragon 2 series ==
The Snapdragon 2 series is the entry-level SoC designed for low-end or ultra-budget smartphones. It replaces the MSM8225 S4 Play model as the lowest-end SoC in the entire Snapdragon lineup.

=== Snapdragon 200 series (2013–2019) ===
Model number	Product name	Fab	CPU	GPU	DSP	ISP	Memory technology	Modem	Connectivity	Quick Charge	Announcement date	Sampling availability
MSM8225Q	Snapdragon 200	45 nm (TSMC 45LP)	4 cores up to 1.4 GHz Cortex-A5	Adreno 203 400 MHz (12.8 GFLOPS in FP32)	Hexagon QDSP5	Up to 8 MP single camera	LPDDR2 Single-channel 333 MHz	Gobi 3G (UMTS: HSPA; GSM: GPRS/EDGE)	Bluetooth 4.1; 802.11b/g/n 2.4 GHz; GPS: IZat Gen8B; USB 2.0	—N/a	2013	2013
MSM8625Q	Snapdragon 200	45 nm (TSMC 45LP)	4 cores up to 1.4 GHz Cortex-A5	Adreno 203 400 MHz (12.8 GFLOPS in FP32)	Hexagon QDSP5	Up to 8 MP single camera	LPDDR2 Single-channel 333 MHz	Gobi 3G (CDMA: 1×Rev.A, 1×EV-DO Rev.A/B; UMTS; GSM)	Bluetooth 4.1; 802.11b/g/n 2.4 GHz; GPS: IZat Gen8B; USB 2.0	—N/a	2013	2013
MSM8210	Snapdragon 200	28 nm (TSMC 28LP)	2 cores up to 1.2 GHz Cortex-A7	Adreno 302 400 MHz (12.8 GFLOPS in FP32)	Hexagon QDSP6	Up to 8 MP single camera	LPDDR2 Single-channel 333 MHz	Gobi 3G (UMTS; GSM)	Bluetooth 4.1; 802.11b/g/n 2.4 GHz; GPS: IZat Gen8B; USB 2.0	—N/a	2013	2013
MSM8610	Snapdragon 200	28 nm (TSMC 28LP)	2 cores up to 1.2 GHz Cortex-A7	Adreno 302 400 MHz (12.8 GFLOPS in FP32)	Hexagon QDSP6	Up to 8 MP single camera	LPDDR2 Single-channel 333 MHz	Gobi 3G (CDMA/UMTS; GSM)	Bluetooth 4.1; 802.11b/g/n 2.4 GHz; GPS: IZat Gen8B; USB 2.0	—N/a	2013	2013
MSM8212	Snapdragon 200	28 nm (TSMC 28LP)	4 cores up to 1.2 GHz Cortex-A7	Adreno 302 400 MHz (12.8 GFLOPS in FP32)	Hexagon QDSP6	Up to 8 MP single camera	LPDDR2 Single-channel 333 MHz	Gobi 3G (UMTS; GSM)	Bluetooth 4.1; 802.11b/g/n 2.4 GHz; GPS: IZat Gen8B; USB 2.0	—N/a	2013	2013
MSM8612	Snapdragon 200	28 nm (TSMC 28LP)	4 cores up to 1.2 GHz Cortex-A7	Adreno 302 400 MHz (12.8 GFLOPS in FP32)	Hexagon QDSP6	Up to 8 MP single camera	LPDDR2 Single-channel 333 MHz	Gobi 3G (CDMA/UMTS; GSM)	Bluetooth 4.1; 802.11b/g/n 2.4 GHz; GPS: IZat Gen8B; USB 2.0	—N/a	2013	2013
MSM8905	Qualcomm 205	28 nm (TSMC 28LP)	2 cores up to 1.1 GHz Cortex-A7	Adreno 304 400 MHz (19.2 GFLOPS in FP32)	Hexagon 536	Up to 3 MP single camera	LPDDR2/3 Single-channel 384 MHz	X5 LTE (Cat 4: download up to 150 Mbit/s, upload up to 50 Mbit/s)	Bluetooth 4.1 + BLE, 802.11n (2.4 GHz)	4.0	March 20, 2017	2017
MSM8208	Snapdragon 208	28 nm (TSMC 28LP)	2 cores up to 1.1 GHz Cortex-A7	Adreno 304 400 MHz (19.2 GFLOPS in FP32)	Hexagon 536	Up to 5 MP single camera	LPDDR2/3 Single-channel 400 MHz	Gobi 3G (multimode CDMA/UMTS: download up to 42 Mbit/s; GSM)	Bluetooth 4.1 + BLE, 802.11n (2.4 GHz)	2.0	September 9, 2014	2014
MSM8909	Snapdragon 210	28 nm (TSMC 28LP)	4 cores up to 1.1 GHz Cortex-A7	Adreno 304 400 MHz (19.2 GFLOPS in FP32)	Hexagon 536	Up to 8 MP single camera	LPDDR2/3 Single-channel 533 MHz	X5 LTE	Bluetooth 4.1 + BLE, 802.11n (2.4 GHz)	2.0	September 9, 2014	2014
MSM8909AA	Snapdragon 212	28 nm (TSMC 28LP)	4 cores up to 1.3 GHz Cortex-A7	Adreno 304 400 MHz (19.2 GFLOPS in FP32)	Hexagon 536	Up to 8 MP single camera	LPDDR2/3 Single-channel 533 MHz	X5 LTE	Bluetooth 4.1 + BLE, 802.11n (2.4 GHz)	2.0	July 28, 2015	2015
QM215	Qualcomm 215	28 nm (TSMC 28LP)	4 cores up to 1.3 GHz Cortex-A53	Adreno 308 485 MHz (23.3 GFLOPS in FP32)	Hexagon	Up to 13 MP single camera / 8 MP dual camera	LPDDR3 Single-channel 672 MHz 3 GB	X5 LTE (Cat 4: download up to 150 Mbit/s, upload up to 50 Mbit/s)	Bluetooth 4.2, NFC, 802.11ac Wi-Fi, Beidou, GPS, GLONASS, USB 2.0	1.0	July 9, 2019	Q3 2019

== Snapdragon 4 series ==
The Snapdragon 4 series is the entry-level SoC designed for the more upmarket entry-level segment, as opposed to the 2 series, which were aimed at ultra-budget segment. Similar to the 2 series, it is the successor of the S4 Play.

=== Snapdragon 400 series (2013–2021) ===
Model number	Product name	Fab	CPU	GPU	DSP	ISP	Memory technology	Modem	Connectivity	Quick Charge	Announcement date	Sampling availability
APQ8026	Snapdragon 400	28 nm (TSMC 28LP)	4 cores up to 1.2 GHz Cortex-A7: 32 KB L1, 512 KB L2	Adreno 305 400 MHz (19.2 GFLOPS in FP32)	Hexagon QDSP6	Up to 13.5 MP single camera	LPDDR2/3 Single-channel 533 MHz	—N/a	Bluetooth 4.0, 802.11 b/g/n, Integrated IZat GNSS	1.0	2013	2013
MSM8226	Snapdragon 400	28 nm (TSMC 28LP)	4 cores up to 1.2 GHz Cortex-A7: 32 KB L1, 512 KB L2	Adreno 305 400 MHz (19.2 GFLOPS in FP32)	Hexagon QDSP6	Up to 13.5 MP single camera	LPDDR2/3 Single-channel 533 MHz	Gobi 3G (UMTS: HSPA+ up to 21 Mbit/s; GSM: GPRS/EDGE)	Bluetooth 4.0, 802.11 b/g/n, Integrated IZat GNSS	1.0	2013	2013
MSM8626	Snapdragon 400	28 nm (TSMC 28LP)	4 cores up to 1.2 GHz Cortex-A7: 32 KB L1, 512 KB L2	Adreno 305 400 MHz (19.2 GFLOPS in FP32)	Hexagon QDSP6	Up to 13.5 MP single camera	LPDDR2/3 Single-channel 533 MHz	Gobi 3G (CDMA/UMTS)	Bluetooth 4.0, 802.11 b/g/n, Integrated IZat GNSS	1.0	2013	2013
MSM8926	Snapdragon 400	28 nm (TSMC 28LP)	4 cores up to 1.2 GHz Cortex-A7: 32 KB L1, 512 KB L2	Adreno 305 400 MHz (19.2 GFLOPS in FP32)	Hexagon QDSP6	Up to 13.5 MP single camera	LPDDR2/3 Single-channel 533 MHz	Gobi 4G (LTE Cat 4: download up to 150 Mbit/s, upload up to 50 Mbit/s)	Bluetooth 4.0, 802.11 b/g/n, Integrated IZat GNSS	1.0	2013	2013
APQ8028	Snapdragon 400	28 nm (TSMC 28LP)	4 cores up to 1.6 GHz Cortex-A7: 32 KB L1, 512 KB L2	Adreno 305 450 MHz (21.6 GFLOPS in FP32)	Hexagon QDSP6	Up to 13.5 MP single camera	LPDDR2/3 Single-channel 533 MHz	—N/a	Bluetooth 4.0, 802.11 b/g/n, Integrated IZat GNSS	1.0	2013	2013
MSM8228	Snapdragon 400	28 nm (TSMC 28LP)	4 cores up to 1.6 GHz Cortex-A7: 32 KB L1, 512 KB L2	Adreno 305 450 MHz (21.6 GFLOPS in FP32)	Hexagon QDSP6	Up to 13.5 MP single camera	LPDDR2/3 Single-channel 533 MHz	Gobi 3G (UMTS)	Bluetooth 4.0, 802.11 b/g/n, Integrated IZat GNSS	1.0	2013	2013
MSM8628	Snapdragon 400	28 nm (TSMC 28LP)	4 cores up to 1.6 GHz Cortex-A7: 32 KB L1, 512 KB L2	Adreno 305 450 MHz (21.6 GFLOPS in FP32)	Hexagon QDSP6	Up to 13.5 MP single camera	LPDDR2/3 Single-channel 533 MHz	Gobi 3G (CDMA/UMTS)	Bluetooth 4.0, 802.11 b/g/n, Integrated IZat GNSS	1.0	2013	2013
MSM8928	Snapdragon 400	28 nm (TSMC 28LP)	4 cores up to 1.6 GHz Cortex-A7: 32 KB L1, 512 KB L2	Adreno 305 450 MHz (21.6 GFLOPS in FP32)	Hexagon QDSP6	Up to 13.5 MP single camera	LPDDR2/3 Single-channel 533 MHz	Gobi 4G (LTE Cat 4)	Bluetooth 4.0, 802.11 b/g/n, Integrated IZat GNSS	1.0	2013	2013
MSM8230	Snapdragon 400	28 nm (TSMC 28LP)	2 cores up to 1.2 GHz Krait 200: 32 KB L1, 1 MB L2	Adreno 305 400 MHz (19.2 GFLOPS in FP32)	Hexagon QDSP6	Up to 13.5 MP single camera	LPDDR2 Single-channel 533 MHz	Gobi 3G (UMTS)	Bluetooth 4.0, 802.11 b/g/n, Integrated IZat GNSS	1.0	2013	2013
MSM8630	Snapdragon 400	28 nm (TSMC 28LP)	2 cores up to 1.2 GHz Krait 200: 32 KB L1, 1 MB L2	Adreno 305 400 MHz (19.2 GFLOPS in FP32)	Hexagon QDSP6	Up to 13.5 MP single camera	LPDDR2 Single-channel 533 MHz	Gobi 3G (CDMA/UMTS)	Bluetooth 4.0, 802.11 b/g/n, Integrated IZat GNSS	1.0	2013	2013
MSM8930	Snapdragon 400	28 nm (TSMC 28LP)	2 cores up to 1.2 GHz Krait 200: 32 KB L1, 1 MB L2	Adreno 305 400 MHz (19.2 GFLOPS in FP32)	Hexagon QDSP6	Up to 13.5 MP single camera	LPDDR2 Single-channel 533 MHz	Gobi 4G (LTE Cat 4)	Bluetooth 4.0, 802.11 b/g/n, Integrated IZat GNSS	1.0	2013	2013
MSM8930AA	Snapdragon 400	28 nm (TSMC 28LP)	2 cores up to 1.4 GHz Krait 300: 32 KB L1, 1 MB L2	Adreno 305 400 MHz (19.2 GFLOPS in FP32)	Hexagon QDSP6	Up to 13.5 MP single camera	LPDDR2 Single-channel 533 MHz	Gobi 4G (LTE Cat 4)	Bluetooth 4.0, 802.11 b/g/n, Integrated IZat GNSS	1.0	2013	2013
APQ8030AB	Snapdragon 400	28 nm (TSMC 28LP)	2 cores up to 1.7 GHz Krait 300: 32 KB L1, 1 MB L2	Adreno 305 450 MHz (21.6 GFLOPS in FP32)	Hexagon QDSP6	Up to 13.5 MP single camera	LPDDR2 Single-channel 533 MHz	—N/a	Bluetooth 4.0, 802.11 b/g/n, Integrated IZat GNSS	1.0	2013	2013
MSM8230AB	Snapdragon 400	28 nm (TSMC 28LP)	2 cores up to 1.7 GHz Krait 300: 32 KB L1, 1 MB L2	Adreno 305 450 MHz (21.6 GFLOPS in FP32)	Hexagon QDSP6	Up to 13.5 MP single camera	LPDDR2 Single-channel 533 MHz	Gobi 3G (UMTS)	Bluetooth 4.0, 802.11 b/g/n, Integrated IZat GNSS	1.0	2013	2013
MSM8630AB	Snapdragon 400	28 nm (TSMC 28LP)	2 cores up to 1.7 GHz Krait 300: 32 KB L1, 1 MB L2	Adreno 305 450 MHz (21.6 GFLOPS in FP32)	Hexagon QDSP6	Up to 13.5 MP single camera	LPDDR2 Single-channel 533 MHz	Gobi 3G (CDMA/UMTS)	Bluetooth 4.0, 802.11 b/g/n, Integrated IZat GNSS	1.0	2013	2013
MSM8930AB	Snapdragon 400	28 nm (TSMC 28LP)	2 cores up to 1.7 GHz Krait 300: 32 KB L1, 1 MB L2	Adreno 305 450 MHz (21.6 GFLOPS in FP32)	Hexagon QDSP6	Up to 13.5 MP single camera	LPDDR2 Single-channel 533 MHz	Gobi 4G (LTE Cat 4)	Bluetooth 4.0, 802.11 b/g/n, Integrated IZat GNSS	1.0	2013	2013
APQ8016	Snapdragon 410	28 nm (TSMC 28LP) / 28 nm (SMIC)	4 cores up to 1.2 GHz Cortex-A53	Adreno 306 400/450 MHz (19.2/21.6 GFLOPS in FP32)	Hexagon QDSP6 V5	Up to 13.5 MP single camera	LPDDR2/3 Single-channel 32-bit 533 MHz (4.2 GB/s)	—N/a	Bluetooth 4.0, 802.11n, NFC, GPS, GLONASS, BeiDou	2.0	December 9, 2013	H1 2014
MSM8916	Snapdragon 410	28 nm (TSMC 28LP) / 28 nm (SMIC)	4 cores up to 1.2 GHz Cortex-A53	Adreno 306 400/450 MHz (19.2/21.6 GFLOPS in FP32)	Hexagon QDSP6 V5	Up to 13.5 MP single camera	LPDDR2/3 Single-channel 32-bit 533 MHz (4.2 GB/s)	X5 LTE (Cat 4: download up to 150 Mbit/s, upload up to 50 Mbit/s)	Bluetooth 4.0, 802.11n, NFC, GPS, GLONASS, BeiDou	2.0	December 9, 2013	H1 2014
MSM8916 v2	Snapdragon 412	28 nm (TSMC 28LP)	4 cores up to 1.4 GHz Cortex-A53	Adreno 306 450 MHz (21.6 GFLOPS in FP32)	Hexagon QDSP6 V5	Up to 13.5 MP single camera	LPDDR2/3 Single-channel 32-bit 600 MHz (4.8 GB/s)	X5 LTE (Cat 4: download up to 150 Mbit/s, upload up to 50 Mbit/s)	Bluetooth 4.0, 802.11n, NFC, GPS, GLONASS, BeiDou	2.0	July 28, 2015	H2 2015
MSM8929	Snapdragon 415	28 nm (TSMC 28LP)	4 + 4 cores (1.4 GHz + 1.0 GHz Cortex-A53)	Adreno 405 465 MHz (44.6 GFLOPS in FP32)	Hexagon V50	Up to 13 MP single camera	LPDDR3 Single-channel 32-bit 667 MHz (5.3 GB/s)	X5 LTE (Cat 4: download up to 150 Mbit/s, upload up to 50 Mbit/s)	Bluetooth 4.1 + BLE Bluetooth, 802.11ac (2.4/5.0 GHz) Multi-User MIMO (MU-MIMO) Wi-Fi, IZat Gen8C Lite GPS	2.0	February 18, 2015	H1 2015
MSM8917	Snapdragon 425	28 nm (TSMC 28LP)	4 cores up to 1.4 GHz Cortex-A53	Adreno 308 598 MHz (28.7 GFLOPS in FP32)	Hexagon 536	Up to 16 MP single camera	LPDDR3 Single-channel 32-bit 667 MHz (5.3 GB/s)	X6 LTE (download: Cat 4, up to 150 Mbit/s; upload: Cat 5, up to 75 Mbit/s)	Bluetooth v4.1, 802.11ac with Multi-User MIMO (MU-MIMO), IZat Gen8C	2.0	February 11, 2016	Q3 2016
MSM8920	Snapdragon 427	28 nm (TSMC 28LP)	4 cores up to 1.4 GHz Cortex-A53	Adreno 308 598 MHz (28.7 GFLOPS in FP32)	Hexagon 536	Up to 16 MP single camera	LPDDR3 Single-channel 32-bit 667 MHz (5.3 GB/s)	X9 LTE (download: Cat 7, up to 300 Mbit/s; upload: Cat 13, up to 150 Mbit/s)	Bluetooth v4.1, 802.11ac with Multi-User MIMO (MU-MIMO), IZat Gen8C	3.0	October 18, 2016	Q1 2017
MSM8937	Snapdragon 430	28 nm (TSMC 28LP)	4 + 4 cores (1.4 GHz + 1.1 GHz Cortex-A53)	Adreno 505 450 MHz (43.2 GFLOPS in FP32)	Hexagon 536	Up to 21 MP single camera	LPDDR3 Single-channel 32-bit 800 MHz (6.4 GB/s)	X6 LTE	Bluetooth v4.1, 802.11ac with Multi-User MIMO (MU-MIMO), IZat Gen8C	3.0	September 15, 2015	Q2 2016
MSM8940	Snapdragon 435	28 nm (TSMC 28LP)	4 + 4 cores (1.4 GHz + 1.1 GHz Cortex-A53)	Adreno 505 450 MHz (43.2 GFLOPS in FP32)	Hexagon 536	Up to 21 MP single camera	LPDDR3 Single-channel 32-bit 800 MHz (6.4 GB/s)	X9 LTE	Bluetooth v4.1, 802.11ac with Multi-User MIMO (MU-MIMO), IZat Gen8C	3.0	February 11, 2016	Q4 2016
SDM429	Snapdragon 429	12 nm (TSMC 12FFC)	4 cores up to 2.0 GHz Cortex-A53	Adreno 504 320 MHz (30.7 GFLOPS in FP32)	Hexagon 536	Up to 16 MP single camera / 8 MP dual camera	LPDDR3 Single-channel 32-bit 800 MHz (6.4 GB/s)	X6 LTE (download: Cat 4, up to 150 Mbit/s; upload: Cat 5, up to 75 Mbit/s)	Bluetooth 5, 802.11ac Wi-Fi up to 433 Mbit/s, USB 2.0	3.0	June 26, 2018	Q3 2018
SDM439	Snapdragon 439	12 nm (TSMC 12FFC)	4 + 4 cores (2.0 GHz + 1.45 GHz Cortex-A53)	Adreno 505 650 MHz (62.4 GFLOPS in FP32)	Hexagon 536	Up to 21 MP single camera / 8 MP dual camera	LPDDR3 Single-channel 32-bit 800 MHz (6.4 GB/s)	X6 LTE (download: Cat 4, up to 150 Mbit/s; upload: Cat 5, up to 75 Mbit/s)	Bluetooth 5, 802.11ac Wi-Fi up to 433 Mbit/s, USB 2.0	3.0	June 26, 2018	Q3 2018
SDM450	Snapdragon 450	14 nm (Samsung 14LPP)	8 cores up to 1.8 GHz Cortex-A53	Adreno 506 600 MHz (57.6 GFLOPS in FP32)	Hexagon 546	Up to 24 MP single camera / 13 MP dual camera	LPDDR3 Single-channel 32-bit 933 MHz (7.5 GB/s)	X9 LTE (download: Cat 7, up to 300 Mbit/s; upload: Cat 13, up to 150 Mbit/s)	Bluetooth 4.1, 802.11ac Wi-Fi up to 433 Mbit/s, USB 3.0	3.0	June 28, 2017	Q3 2017
SM4250-AA	Snapdragon 460	11 nm (Samsung 11LPP)	4 + 4 cores (1.6 GHz Kryo 240 Gold – Cortex-A73 + 1.8 GHz Kryo 240 Silver – Cortex-A53)	Adreno 610 600 MHz (153.6 GFLOPS in FP32)	Hexagon 683	Spectra 340 (48 MP single camera / 16 MP dual camera)	LPDDR3 up to 933 MHz or LPDDR4X Dual-channel 16-bit (32-bit) 1866 MHz (14.9 GB/s)	X11 LTE (Cat 13: download up to 390 Mbit/s, upload up to 150 Mbit/s)	FastConnect 6100, Bluetooth 5.1, NFC, Wi-Fi 802.11a/b/g/n, 802.11ac Wave 2, 802.11ax-ready, NavIC, USB C	3.0	January 20, 2020	Q1 2020
SM4350	Snapdragon 480	8 nm (Samsung 8LPP)	2 + 6 cores (2.0 GHz Kryo 460 Gold – Cortex-A76 + 1.8 GHz Kryo 460 Silver – Cortex-A55)	Adreno 619 650 MHz (332.8 GFLOPS in FP32)	Hexagon 686 (3.3 TOPS)	Spectra 345 (64 MP single camera / 25+13 MP dual camera with ZSL / 13 MP triple camera with ZSL)	LPDDR4X Dual-channel 16-bit (32-bit), 2133 MHz (17.0 GB/s)	Internal X51 5G (5G NR Sub-6 & mmWave: download up to 2.5 Gbit/s, upload up to 660 Mbit/s; LTE: download Cat 15, up to 800 Mbit/s, upload Cat 18, up to 210 Mbit/s)	FastConnect 6200, Bluetooth 5.1, NFC, 802.11a/b/g/n/ac/ax-ready 2x2 (MU-MIMO), USB C	4+	January 4, 2021	H1 2021
SM4350-AC	Snapdragon 480+	8 nm (Samsung 8LPP)	2 + 6 cores (2.2 GHz Kryo 460 Gold – Cortex-A76 + 1.9 GHz Kryo 460 Silver – Cortex-A55)	Adreno 619 650 MHz (332.8 GFLOPS in FP32)	Hexagon 686 (3.3 TOPS)	Spectra 345 (64 MP single camera / 25+13 MP dual camera with ZSL / 13 MP triple camera with ZSL)	LPDDR4X Dual-channel 16-bit (32-bit), 2133 MHz (17.0 GB/s)	Internal X51 5G (5G NR Sub-6 & mmWave: download up to 2.5 Gbit/s, upload up to 660 Mbit/s; LTE: download Cat 15, up to 800 Mbit/s, upload Cat 18, up to 210 Mbit/s)	FastConnect 6200, Bluetooth 5.2, NFC, 802.11a/b/g/n/ac 2x2 (MU-MIMO), USB C	4+	October 26, 2021	Q4 2021

=== Snapdragon 4 (since 2022) ===
Model number	Product name	Fab	CPU (Cores / Freq)	GPU	DSP	ISP	Memory technology	Modem	Connectivity	Quick Charge	Announcement date	Sampling availability
SM4375	Snapdragon 4 Gen 1	6 nm (TSMC N6)	Kryo; 2 + 6 cores (2.0 GHz Cortex-A78 + 1.8 GHz Cortex-A55)	Adreno 619 700 MHz (358.4 GFLOPS in FP32)	Hexagon	Spectra (108 MP single camera / 25+13 MP dual camera with ZSL / 13 MP triple camera with ZSL)	LPDDR4X Dual-channel 16-bit (32-bit) 2133 MHz (17.0 GB/s)	Internal X51 5G (5G NR Sub-6: download up to 2.5 Gbit/s, upload up to 900 Mbit/s; LTE: download Cat 15, up to 800 Mbit/s, upload Cat 18, up to 210 Mbit/s)	FastConnect 6200, Bluetooth 5.2, 802.11a/b/g/n/ac 2x2 (MU-MIMO), USB 3.1	4+	September 6, 2022	Q3 2022
SM4450	Snapdragon 4 Gen 2	4 nm (Samsung 4LPX)	Kryo; 2 + 6 cores (2.2 GHz Cortex-A78 + 1.95 GHz Cortex-A55)	Adreno 613 955 MHz (244.5 GFLOPS in FP32)	—N/a	Spectra (108 MP single camera / 16 MP dual camera with ZSL)	LPDDR4X dual-channel 16-bit (32-bit) 2133 MHz (17.0 GB/s) or LPDDR5 dual-channel 16-bit (32-bit) 3200 MHz (25.6 GB/s)	Internal X61 5G (5G NR Sub-6: download up to 2.5 Gbit/s, upload up to 900 Mbit/s)	Bluetooth 5.1, 802.11a/b/g/n/ac 1x1, USB 3.2 Gen 1	4+	June 26, 2023	Q2 2023
SM4450	Snapdragon 4 Gen 2 Accelerated Edition (Note: Also known as "Leading Version".)	4 nm (Samsung 4LPX)	Kryo; 2 + 6 cores (2.3 GHz Cortex-A78 + 1.95 GHz Cortex-A55)	Adreno 613 1010 MHz (258.6 GFLOPS in FP32)	—N/a	Spectra (108 MP single camera / 16 MP dual camera with ZSL)	LPDDR4X dual-channel 16-bit (32-bit) 2133 MHz (17.0 GB/s) or LPDDR5 dual-channel 16-bit (32-bit) 3200 MHz (25.6 GB/s)	Internal X61 5G (5G NR Sub-6: download up to 2.5 Gbit/s, upload up to 900 Mbit/s)	Bluetooth 5.1, 802.11a/b/g/n/ac 1x1, USB 3.2 Gen 1	4+	May 17, 2024	Q2 2024
SM4635	Snapdragon 4s Gen 2	4 nm (Samsung 4LPX)	Kryo; 2 + 6 cores (2.0 GHz Cortex-A78 + 1.8 GHz Cortex-A55)	Adreno 611	—N/a	Spectra (84 MP single camera / 16 MP dual camera with ZSL)	LPDDR4X Dual-channel 16-bit (32-bit) 2133 MHz (17.0 GB/s)	Internal (5G NR Sub-6: download up to 1 Gbit/s)	Bluetooth 5.1, 802.11a/b/g/n/ac 1x1, USB 3.2 Gen 1	4+	July 30, 2024	Q3 2024
SM4450-AF	Snapdragon 4 Gen 4	4 nm (Samsung 4LPX)	Kryo; 2 + 6 cores (2.3 GHz Cortex-A78 + 1.95 GHz Cortex-A55)	Adreno 613	—N/a	Spectra (108 MP single camera / 16 MP dual camera with ZSL)	LPDDR4X dual-channel 16-bit (32-bit) 2133 MHz (17.0 GB/s) or LPDDR5 dual-channel 16-bit (32-bit) 3200 MHz (25.6 GB/s)	Internal X61 5G (5G NR Sub-6: download up to 2.5 Gbit/s, upload up to 900 Mbit/s)	Bluetooth 5.1, 802.11a/b/g/n/ac 1x1, USB 3.2 Gen 1	4+	December 12, 2025	Q4 2025
SM4850	Snapdragon 4 Gen 5	4 nm (Samsung 4LPX)	Kryo; 2 + 6 cores (2.4 GHz Cortex-A78 + 2.0 GHz Cortex-A55)	Adreno 629 840 MHz (430.1 GFLOPS in FP32)	—N/a	Spectra (108 MP single camera / 16 MP dual camera with ZSL)	LPDDR4X dual-channel 16-bit (32-bit) 2133 MHz (17.0 GB/s)	Internal (5G NR Sub-6: download up to 2.8 Gbit/s, upload up to 900 Mbit/s)	Bluetooth 5.1, 802.11a/b/g/n/ac 1x1, USB 2.0	5	May 7, 2026	Q2 2026

== Snapdragon 6 series ==
The Snapdragon 6 series is the mid-range SoC primarily targeted at both the entry-level and mid-range segments, succeeding the S4 Plus. It is the most commonly used Snapdragon line-up, appearing in mainstream devices of various manufacturers.

=== Snapdragon 600 series (2013–2023) ===
Unlike the later models of the 600 series, Snapdragon 600 was considered a high-end SoC similar to the Snapdragon 800, and was the direct successor of both the Snapdragon S4 Plus and S4 Pro. The Snapdragon 615 was Qualcomm's first octa-core SoC. Starting with the Snapdragon 610, the 600 series became a mid-range SoC lineup, as opposed to the original Snapdragon 600, which was a high-end model.

Model number	Product name	Fab	CPU (Cores/Freq)	GPU	DSP	ISP	Memory technology	Modem	Connectivity	Quick Charge	Announcement date	Sampling availability
APQ8064-1AA (DEB/FLO)	Snapdragon 600 (Advertised as S4 Pro)	28 nm (TSMC 28LP)	4 cores up to 1.5 GHz; Krait 300	Adreno 320 400 MHz (76.8 GFLOPS in FP32)	Hexagon QDSP6 V4 500 MHz	Up to 21 MP single camera; Video Capture: 1080p@30fps	DDR3L-1600 (12.8 GB/s)	External	Bluetooth 4.0, Wi-Fi 802.11ac (2.4/5 GHz), IZat Gen8A	1.0	January 8, 2013	Q1 2013
APQ8064M	Snapdragon 600	28 nm (TSMC 28LP)	4 cores up to 1.7 GHz Krait 300	Adreno 320 400 MHz (76.8 GFLOPS in FP32)	Hexagon QDSP6 V4 500 MHz	Up to 21 MP single camera; Video Capture: 1080p@30fps	LPDDR3 Dual-channel 32-bit (64-bit) 533 MHz (8.6 GB/s)	External	Bluetooth 4.0, Wi-Fi 802.11ac (2.4/5 GHz), IZat Gen8A	1.0	January 8, 2013	Q1 2013
APQ8064T	Snapdragon 600	28 nm (TSMC 28LP)	4 cores up to 1.7 GHz Krait 300	Adreno 320 400 MHz (76.8 GFLOPS in FP32)	Hexagon QDSP6 V4 500 MHz	Up to 21 MP single camera; Video Capture: 1080p@30fps	LPDDR3 Dual-channel 32-bit (64-bit) 600 MHz (9.6 GB/s)	External	Bluetooth 4.0, Wi-Fi 802.11ac (2.4/5 GHz), IZat Gen8A	1.0	January 8, 2013	Q1 2013
APQ8064AB	Snapdragon 600	28 nm (TSMC 28LP)	4 cores up to 1.9 GHz Krait 300	Adreno 320 450 MHz (86.4 GFLOPS in FP32)	Hexagon QDSP6 V4 500 MHz	Up to 21 MP single camera; Video Capture: 1080p@30fps	LPDDR3 Dual-channel 32-bit (64-bit) 600 MHz (9.6 GB/s)	External	Bluetooth 4.0, Wi-Fi 802.11ac (2.4/5 GHz), IZat Gen8A	1.0	January 8, 2013	Q1 2013
MSM8936	Snapdragon 610	28 nm (TSMC 28LP)	4 cores up to 1.7 GHz Cortex-A53	Adreno 405 550 MHz (52.8 GFLOPS in FP32)	Hexagon V50 700 MHz	Up to 21 MP single camera; Video Capture: 1080p@30fps	LPDDR3 Single-channel 32-bit 800 MHz (6.4 GB/s)	X5 LTE (Cat 4: download up to 150 Mbit/s, upload up to 50 Mbit/s)	Bluetooth 4.0, Qualcomm VIVE, Wi-Fi 802.11ac, NFC, GPS, Glonass, BeiDou	2.0	February 24, 2014	Q3 2014
MSM8939	Snapdragon 615	28 nm (TSMC 28LP)	4 + 4 cores (1.7 GHz + 1.1 GHz) Cortex-A53	Adreno 405 550 MHz (52.8 GFLOPS in FP32)	Hexagon V50 700 MHz	Up to 21 MP single camera; Video Capture: 1080p@30fps	LPDDR3 Single-channel 32-bit 800 MHz (6.4 GB/s)	X5 LTE (Cat 4: download up to 150 Mbit/s, upload up to 50 Mbit/s)	Bluetooth 4.0, Qualcomm VIVE, Wi-Fi 802.11ac, NFC, GPS, Glonass, BeiDou	2.0	February 24, 2014	Q3 2014
MSM8939 v2	Snapdragon 616	28 nm (TSMC 28LP)	4 + 4 cores (1.7 GHz + 1.2 GHz) Cortex-A53	Adreno 405 550 MHz (52.8 GFLOPS in FP32)	Hexagon V50 700 MHz	Up to 21 MP single camera; Video Capture: 1080p@30fps	LPDDR3 Single-channel 32-bit 800 MHz (6.4 GB/s)	X5 LTE (Cat 4: download up to 150 Mbit/s, upload up to 50 Mbit/s)	Bluetooth 4.0, Qualcomm VIVE, Wi-Fi 802.11ac, NFC, GPS, Glonass, BeiDou	2.0	July 31, 2015	Q3 2015
MSM8952	Snapdragon 617	28 nm (TSMC 28LP)	4 + 4 cores (1.5 GHz + 1.2 GHz) Cortex-A53	Adreno 405 550 MHz (52.8 GFLOPS in FP32)	Hexagon 546	Up to 21 MP single camera; Video Capture: 1080p@30fps	LPDDR3 Single-channel 32-bit 933 MHz (7.5 GB/s)	X8 LTE (Cat 7: download up to 300 Mbit/s, upload up to 100 Mbit/s)	Bluetooth 4.1, VIVE 1-stream 802.11ac Wi-Fi, IZat Gen8C; USB 2.0	3.0	September 15, 2015	Q4 2015
MSM8953	Snapdragon 625	14 nm (Samsung 14LPP)	8 cores up to 2.0 GHz Cortex-A53	Adreno 506 650 MHz (62.4 GFLOPS in FP32)	Hexagon 546	Up to 24 MP single camera; Video Capture: 4K@30fps	LPDDR3 Single-channel 32-bit 933 MHz (7.5 GB/s)	X9 LTE (download: Cat 7, up to 300 Mbit/s; upload: Cat 13, up to 150 Mbit/s)	Bluetooth 4.1, NFC, VIVE 1-stream Wi-Fi 802.11ac MU-MIMO, IZat Gen8C; USB 3.0	3.0	February 11, 2016	Q2 2016
MSM8953 Pro	Snapdragon 626	14 nm (Samsung 14LPP)	8 cores up to 2.2 GHz Cortex-A53	Adreno 506 650 MHz (62.4 GFLOPS in FP32)	Hexagon 546	Up to 24 MP single camera; Video Capture: 4K@30fps	LPDDR3 Single-channel 32-bit 933 MHz (7.5 GB/s)	X9 LTE (download: Cat 7, up to 300 Mbit/s; upload: Cat 13, up to 150 Mbit/s)	Bluetooth 4.1, NFC, VIVE 1-stream Wi-Fi 802.11ac MU-MIMO, IZat Gen8C; USB 3.0	3.0	October 18, 2016	Q4 2016
SDM630	Snapdragon 630	14 nm (Samsung 14LPP)	4 + 4 cores (2.2 GHz + 1.8 GHz) Cortex-A53)	Adreno 508 650 MHz (124.8 GFLOPS in FP32)	Hexagon 642	Spectra 160 (24 MP single camera / 13 MP dual camera; Video Capture: 4K@30fps)	LPDDR4 Dual-channel 16-bit (32-bit) 1333 MHz (10.66 GB/s)	X12 LTE (download: Cat 12, up to 600 Mbit/s; upload: Cat 13, up to 150 Mbit/s)	Bluetooth 5, 802.11ac Wi-Fi 1x1, NFC, USB 3.1	4.0	May 8, 2017	Q2 2017
SDM632	Snapdragon 632	14 nm (Samsung 14LPP)	4 + 4 cores (1.8 GHz Kryo 250 Gold – Cortex-A73 + 1.8 GHz Kryo 250 Silver – Cortex-A53)	Adreno 506 725 MHz (69.6 GFLOPS in FP32)	Hexagon 546	Up to 40 MP single camera, 13 MP dual camera; Video Capture: 4K@30fps	LPDDR3 Single-channel 32-bit 933 MHz (7.5 GB/s)	X9 LTE (download: Cat 7, up to 300 Mbit/s; upload: Cat 13, up to 150 Mbit/s)	Bluetooth 5, 802.11ac Wi-Fi 1x1, NFC, USB 3.1	3.0	June 26, 2018	Q3 2018
SDM636	Snapdragon 636	14 nm (Samsung 14LPP)	4 + 4 cores (1.8 GHz Kryo 260 Gold – Cortex-A73 + 1.6 GHz Kryo 260 Silver – Cortex-A53)	Adreno 509 430 MHz (110.1 GFLOPS in FP32)	Hexagon 680	Spectra 160 (24 MP single camera / 16 MP dual camera; Video Capture: 4K@30fps)	LPDDR4 Dual-channel 16-bit (32-bit) 1333 MHz (10.7 GB/s)	X12 LTE (download: Cat 12, up to 600 Mbit/s; upload: Cat 13, up to 150 Mbit/s)	Bluetooth 5, 802.11ac Wi-Fi 1x1, NFC, USB 3.1	4.0	October 17, 2017	Q4 2017
MSM8956	Snapdragon 650	28 nm (TSMC 28HPM)	2 + 4 cores (1.8 GHz Cortex-A72 + 1.4 GHz Cortex-A53)	Adreno 510 600 MHz (153.6 GFLOPS in FP32)	Hexagon V56	Up to 21 MP single camera; Video Capture: 4K@30fps	LPDDR3 Dual-channel 32-bit (64-bit) 933 MHz (14.9 GB/s)	X8 LTE (Cat 7: download up to 300 Mbit/s, upload up to 100 Mbit/s)	Bluetooth Smart 4.1, VIVE 1-stream 802.11ac Wi-Fi, IZat Gen8C GNSS; USB 2.0	3.0	February 18, 2015	Q1 2016
MSM8976	Snapdragon 652	28 nm (TSMC 28HPM)	4 + 4 cores (1.8 GHz Cortex-A72 + 1.4 GHz Cortex-A53)	Adreno 510 600 MHz (153.6 GFLOPS in FP32)	Hexagon V56	Up to 21 MP single camera; Video Capture: 4K@30fps	LPDDR3 Dual-channel 32-bit (64-bit) 933 MHz (14.9 GB/s)	X8 LTE (Cat 7: download up to 300 Mbit/s, upload up to 100 Mbit/s)	Bluetooth Smart 4.1, VIVE 1-stream 802.11ac Wi-Fi, IZat Gen8C GNSS; USB 2.0	3.0	February 18, 2015	Q1 2016
MSM8976 Pro	Snapdragon 653	28 nm (TSMC 28HPM)	4 + 4 cores (1.95 GHz Cortex-A72 + 1.4 GHz Cortex-A53)	Adreno 510 621 MHz (159 GFLOPS in FP32)	Hexagon V56	Up to 21 MP single camera; Video Capture: 4K@30fps	LPDDR3 Dual-channel 32-bit (64-bit) 933 MHz (14.9 GB/s)	X9 LTE (download: Cat 7, up to 300 Mbit/s; upload: Cat 13, up to 150 Mbit/s)	Bluetooth Smart 4.1, VIVE 1-stream 802.11ac Wi-Fi, IZat Gen8C GNSS; USB 2.0	3.0	October 18, 2016	Q4 2016
SDM660	Snapdragon 660	14 nm (Samsung 14LPP)	4 + 4 cores (2.2 GHz Kryo 260 Gold – Cortex-A73 + 1.84 GHz Kryo 260 Silver – Cortex-A53)	Adreno 512 647 MHz (165.6 GFLOPS in FP32)	Hexagon 680	Spectra 160 (48 MP single camera / 16 MP dual camera; Video Capture: 4K@30fps)	LPDDR4X Dual-channel 16-bit (32-bit) 1866 MHz (14.9 GB/s)	X12 LTE (download: Cat 12, up to 600 Mbit/s; upload: Cat 13, up to 150 Mbit/s)	Bluetooth 5, 802.11ac Wi-Fi, NFC, USB 3.1	4.0	May 8, 2017	Q2 2017
SDA660	Snapdragon 660	14 nm (Samsung 14LPP)	4 + 4 cores (2.2 GHz Kryo 260 Gold – Cortex-A73 + 1.84 GHz Kryo 260 Silver – Cortex-A53)	Adreno 512 647 MHz (165.6 GFLOPS in FP32)	Hexagon 680	Spectra 160 (48 MP single camera / 16 MP dual camera; Video Capture: 4K@30fps)	LPDDR4X Dual-channel 16-bit (32-bit) 1866 MHz (14.9 GB/s)	Internal: no	Bluetooth 5, 802.11ac Wi-Fi, NFC, USB 3.1	4.0	May 8, 2017	Q2 2017
SM6115	Snapdragon 662	11 nm (Samsung 11LPP)	4 + 4 cores (2.0 GHz Kryo 260 Gold – Cortex-A73 + 1.8 GHz Kryo 260 Silver – Cortex-A53)	Adreno 610 950 MHz (243.2 GFLOPS in FP32)	Hexagon 683	Spectra 340T (48 MP single camera / 13 MP dual camera; Video Capture: 1080p@60fps)	LPDDR3 933 MHz LPDDR4X Dual-channel 16-bit (32-bit) 1866 MHz (14.9 GB/s)	X11 LTE (Cat 13: download up to 390 Mbit/s, upload up to 150 Mbit/s)	FastConnect 6100, Bluetooth 5.1, NFC, Wi-Fi 802.11ac Wave 2, 802.11ax-ready, NavIC, USB C	3.0	January 20, 2020	Q1 2020
SM6125	Snapdragon 665	11 nm (Samsung 11LPP)	4 + 4 cores (2.0 GHz Kryo 260 Gold – Cortex-A73 + 1.8 GHz Kryo 260 Silver – Cortex-A53)	Adreno 610 950 MHz (243.2 GFLOPS in FP32)	Hexagon 686 (3.3 TOPS)	Spectra 165 (48 MP single camera / 16 MP dual camera; Video Capture: 4K@30fps)	LPDDR3 933 MHz LPDDR4X Dual-channel 16-bit (32-bit) 1866 MHz (14.9 GB/s)	X12 LTE (download: Cat 12, up to 600 Mbit/s; upload: Cat 13, up to 150 Mbit/s)	Bluetooth 5.1, Wi-Fi 802.11ac, NFC, USB 3.1	3.0	April 9, 2019	Q2 2019
SDM670	Snapdragon 670	10 nm (Samsung 10LPP)	2 + 6 cores (2.0 GHz Kryo 360 Gold – Cortex-A75 + 1.7 GHz Kryo 360 Silver – Cortex-A55)	Adreno 615 430 MHz (220.2 GFLOPS in FP32)	Hexagon 685 (3 TOPS)	Spectra 250 (192 MP single camera / 16 MP dual camera with ZSL; Video Capture: 4K@30fps)	LPDDR4X Dual-channel 16-bit (32-bit) 1866 MHz (14.9 GB/s)	X12 LTE (download: Cat 12, up to 600 Mbit/s; upload: Cat 13, up to 150 Mbit/s)	Bluetooth 5, 802.11ac Wi-Fi, NFC, USB 3.1	4+	August 8, 2018	Q3 2018
SM6150	Snapdragon 675	11 nm (Samsung 11LPP)	2 + 6 cores (2.0 GHz Kryo 460 Gold – Cortex-A76 + 1.7 GHz Kryo 460 Silver – Cortex-A55)	Adreno 612 845 MHz (216.3 GFLOPS in FP32)	Hexagon 685 (3 TOPS)	Spectra 250L (192 MP single camera / 16 MP dual camera with ZSL; Video Capture: 4K@30fps)	LPDDR4X Dual-channel 16-bit (32-bit) 1866 MHz (14.9 GB/s)	X12 LTE (download: Cat 12, up to 600 Mbit/s; upload: Cat 13, up to 150 Mbit/s)	Bluetooth 5, 802.11ac Wi-Fi, NFC, USB 3.1	4+	October 22, 2018	Q1 2019
SM6150- AC	Snapdragon 678	11 nm (Samsung 11LPP)	2 + 6 cores (2.2 GHz Kryo 460 Gold – Cortex-A76 + 1.7 GHz Kryo 460 Silver – Cortex-A55)	Adreno 612 895 MHz (229.1 GFLOPS in FP32)	Hexagon 685 (3 TOPS)	Spectra 250L (192 MP single camera / 16 MP dual camera with ZSL; Video Capture: 4K@30fps)	LPDDR4X Dual-channel 16-bit (32-bit) 1866 MHz (14.9 GB/s)	X12 LTE (download: Cat 12, up to 600 Mbit/s; upload: Cat 13, up to 150 Mbit/s)	Bluetooth 5, 802.11ac Wi-Fi, NFC, USB 3.1	4+	December 15, 2020	Q4 2020
SM6225	Snapdragon 680	6 nm (TSMC N6)	4 + 4 cores (2.4 GHz Kryo 265 Gold – Cortex-A73 + 1.9 GHz Kryo 265 Silver – Cortex-A53)	Adreno 610 1114 MHz (285.2 GFLOPS in FP32)	Hexagon 686 (3.3 TOPS)	Spectra 346 (64 MP single camera / 16 MP dual camera with ZSL / 13+13+5 MP triple camera with ZSL; Video Capture: 1080p@60fps)	LPDDR4X Dual-channel 16-bit (32-bit) 2133 MHz (17 GB/s)	X11 LTE (Cat 13: download up to 390 Mbit/s, upload up to 150 Mbit/s)	FastConnect 6100, Bluetooth 5.1, Wi-Fi 802.11ac Wave 2, NFC, NavIC, USB C	3.0	October 26, 2021	Q4 2021
SM6225- AD	Snapdragon 685	6 nm (TSMC N6)	4 + 4 cores (2.8 GHz Kryo 265 Gold – Cortex-A73 + 1.9 GHz Kryo 265 Silver – Cortex-A53)	Adreno 610 1260 MHz (322.6 GFLOPS in FP32)	Hexagon 686 (3.3 TOPS)	Spectra (108 MP single camera / 16 MP dual camera with ZSL / 13+13+5 MP triple camera with ZSL; Video Capture: 1080p@60fps)	LPDDR4X Dual-channel 16-bit (32-bit) 2133 MHz (17 GB/s)	X11 LTE (Cat 13: download up to 390 Mbit/s, upload up to 150 Mbit/s)	FastConnect 6200, Bluetooth 5.2, Wi-Fi 802.1ac 1x1, USB 3.1	3.0	March 23, 2023	Q1 2023
SM6350	Snapdragon 690	8 nm (Samsung 8LPP)	2 + 6 cores (2.0 GHz Kryo 560 Gold – Cortex-A77 + 1.7 GHz Kryo 560 Silver – Cortex-A55)	Adreno 619L 565 MHz (289.3 GFLOPS in FP32)	Hexagon 692 (5 TOPS)	Spectra 355L (192 MP single camera / 32+16 MP dual camera with ZSL; Video Capture: 4K@30fps HDR)	LPDDR4X Dual-channel 16-bit (32-bit) 1866 MHz (14.9 GB/s)	Internal X51 5G (5G NR Sub-6: download up to 2.5 Gbit/s, upload up to 900 Mbit/s; LTE Cat 18: download up to 1.2 Gbit/s, upload up to 210 Mbit/s)	FastConnect 6200, Bluetooth 5.1, 802.11ac 2x2 (MU-MIMO), NFC, USB 3.1	4+	June 16, 2020	H2 2020
SM6375	Snapdragon 695	6 nm (TSMC N6)	2 + 6 cores (2.2 GHz Kryo 660 Gold – Cortex-A78 + 1.8 GHz Kryo 660 Silver – Cortex-A55)	Adreno 619 840 MHz (430.1 GFLOPS in FP32)	Hexagon 686 (3.3 TOPS)	Spectra 346T (108 MP single camera / 25+13 MP dual camera with ZSL / 13 MP triple camera with ZSL; Video Capture: 1080p@60fps)	LPDDR4X Dual-channel 16-bit (32-bit) 2133 MHz (17 GB/s)	Internal X51 5G (5G NR Sub-6 & mmWave: download up to 2.5 Gbit/s, upload up to 1.5 Gbit/s; LTE: download Cat 15, up to 800 Mbit/s, upload Cat 18, up to 210 Mbit/s)	FastConnect 6200, Bluetooth 5.2, 802.11ac 2x2 (MU-MIMO), NFC, USB C	4+	October 26, 2021	Q4 2021

=== Snapdragon 6s 4G (since 2024) ===
The 600 series concluded in 2023 with the 695. The 6s 4G series (2024–) targets cost-sensitive 4G-only markets using recycled architectures on mature nodes. Notable examples include the 6s 4G Gen 1 (rebadged SM6115 (Snapdragon 662) from 2020) and Gen 2 (rebadged SM6225 (Snapdragon 680/685) from 2021).

Model number	Product name	Fab	CPU (Cores / Freq)	GPU	DSP	ISP	Memory technology	Modem	Connectivity	Quick Charge	Announcement date	Sampling availability
SM6115-AC	Snapdragon 6s 4G Gen 1	11 nm (Samsung 11LPP)	Kryo; 4 + 4 cores (2.1 GHz Cortex-A73 + 2.0 GHz Cortex-A53)	Adreno 610 1050 MHz (268.8 GFLOPS in FP32)	Hexagon	Spectra (48 MP single camera / 13 MP dual camera with ZSL; Video Capture: 1080p@60fps)	LPDDR3 up to 933 MHz / LPDDR4X Dual-channel 16-bit (32-bit) 2133 MHz (17 GB/s)	X11 LTE (Cat 13: download up to 390 Mbit/s, upload up to 150 Mbit/s)	FastConnect 6100, Bluetooth 5.1, Wi-Fi 802.11a/b/g/n, 802.11ac Wave 2, 802.11ax-ready, USB C	3.0	August 9, 2024	Q3 2024
SM6225-AF	Snapdragon 6s 4G Gen 2	6 nm (TSMC N6)	Kryo; 4 + 4 cores (2.9 GHz Cortex-A73 + 1.9 GHz Cortex-A53)	Adreno 610	Hexagon	Spectra (108 MP single camera / 16 MP dual camera with ZSL / 13+13+5 MP triple camera with ZSL; Video Capture: 1080p@60fps)	LPDDR4X Dual-channel 16-bit (32-bit) 2133 MHz (17 GB/s)	X11 LTE (Cat 13: download up to 390 Mbit/s, upload up to 150 Mbit/s)	FastConnect 6200, Bluetooth 5.2, Wi-Fi 802.1ac 1x1, USB 3.1	3.0	December 12, 2025	Q4 2025

=== Snapdragon 6 (since 2022) ===
Qualcomm adopted generational naming in 2022 with the Snapdragon 6 series. All models feature integrated 5G modems and Wi-Fi 6/6E. The "6s" variants offer reduced specifications at lower price points. The series transitioned from Samsung 4LPX (Gen 1) to TSMC N4P (Gen 4), achieving significant efficiency gains. The Gen 4 introduces Cortex-A720/A520 cores, marking the first departure from A78/A55 combinations in the lineup and bringing architecture parity with the 7- and 8-series designs albeit with smaller cores at lower clock speeds.

Model number	Product name	Fab	CPU (Cores / Freq)	GPU	DSP	ISP	Memory technology	Modem	Connectivity	Quick Charge	Announcement date	Sampling availability
SM6450	Snapdragon 6 Gen 1	4 nm (Samsung 4LPX)	Kryo; 4 + 4 cores (2.2 GHz Cortex-A78 + 1.8 GHz Cortex-A55)	Adreno 710 676 MHz (346.1 GFLOPS in FP32)	Hexagon	Spectra (200 MP Photo Capture / 48 MP single camera with ZSL / 25+16 MP dual camera with ZSL / 13 MP triple camera with ZSL; Video Capture: 4K@30fps HDR)	LPDDR5 Dual-channel 16-bit (32-bit) 2750 MHz (22 GB/s)	Internal: X62 5G (5G NR Sub-6 & mmWave: download up to 2.9 Gbit/s, upload up to 1.6 Gbit/s; LTE Cat 18: download up to 1.2 Gbit/s, upload up to 210 Mbit/s)	FastConnect 6700; Bluetooth 5.2; 802.11a/b/g/n/ac/ax (Wi-Fi 6E) 2x2 (MU-MIMO) up to 2.9 Gbit/s; GPS, GLONASS, NavIC, Beidou, Galileo, QZSS; USB 3.1	4+	September 6, 2022	Q1 2023
SM6475-AB	Snapdragon 6 Gen 3	4 nm (Samsung 4LPX)	Kryo; 4 + 4 cores (2.4 GHz Cortex-A78 + 1.8 GHz Cortex-A55)	Adreno 710 940 MHz (481.3 GFLOPS in FP32) or 1010 MHz (517.1 GFLOPS in FP32)	Hexagon	Spectra (200 MP Photo Capture / 48 MP single camera with ZSL / 32+16 MP dual camera with ZSL / 16 MP triple camera with ZSL; Video Capture: 4K@30fps HDR)	LPDDR4X dual-channel 16-bit (32-bit) 2133 MHz (17.0 GB/s) or LPDDR5X dual-channel 16-bit (32-bit) 3200 MHz (25.6 GB/s)	Internal: X62 5G (5G NR Sub-6 & mmWave: download up to 2.9 Gbit/s, upload up to 1.6 Gbit/s; LTE Cat 18: download up to 1.2 Gbit/s, upload up to 210 Mbit/s)	FastConnect 6700; Bluetooth 5.2; 802.11a/b/g/n/ac/ax (Wi-Fi 6E) 2x2 (MU-MIMO) up to 2.9 Gbit/s; GPS, GLONASS, NavIC, Beidou, Galileo, QZSS; USB 3.1	4+	August 31, 2024	Q3 2024
SM6475Q	Snapdragon 6 Gen 3	4 nm (Samsung 4LPX)	Kryo; 3 + 3 cores (2.4 GHz Cortex-A78 + 1.8 GHz Cortex-A55)	Adreno 710 940 MHz (481.3 GFLOPS in FP32) or 1010 MHz (517.1 GFLOPS in FP32)	Hexagon	Spectra (200 MP Photo Capture / 48 MP single camera with ZSL / 32+16 MP dual camera with ZSL / 16 MP triple camera with ZSL; Video Capture: 4K@30fps HDR)	LPDDR4X dual-channel 16-bit (32-bit) 2133 MHz (17.0 GB/s) or LPDDR5X dual-channel 16-bit (32-bit) 3200 MHz (25.6 GB/s)	—N/a	FastConnect 6700; Bluetooth 5.2; 802.11a/b/g/n/ac/ax (Wi-Fi 6E) 2x2 (MU-MIMO) up to 2.9 Gbit/s; GPS, GLONASS, NavIC, Beidou, Galileo, QZSS; USB 3.1	4+	August 31, 2024	Q2 2026
SM6375-AC	Snapdragon 6s Gen 3	6 nm (TSMC N6)	Kryo; 2 + 6 cores (2.3 GHz Cortex-A78 + 2.0 GHz Cortex-A55)	Adreno 619 900 MHz (460.8 GFLOPS in FP32)	Hexagon	Spectra (108 MP single camera / 25+13 MP dual camera with ZSL / 13 MP triple camera with ZSL; Video Capture: 1080p@60fps)	LPDDR4X Dual-channel 16-bit (32-bit) 2133 MHz (17 GB/s)	Internal X51 5G (5G NR Sub-6 & mmWave: download up to 2.5 Gbit/s, upload up to 1.5 Gbit/s; LTE: download Cat 15, up to 800 Mbit/s, upload Cat 18, up to 210 Mbit/s)	FastConnect 6200, Bluetooth 5.2, 802.11a/b/g/n/ac 2x2 (MU-MIMO), NavIC, USB C	4+	June 6, 2024	Q2 2024
SM6650	Snapdragon 6 Gen 4	4 nm (TSMC N4P)	Kryo (1× 2.3 GHz Cortex-A720 + 3× 2.2 GHz Cortex-A720 + 4× 1.8 GHz Cortex-A520)	Adreno 810 895 MHz (458.2 GFLOPS in FP32)	Hexagon	Spectra (200 MP Photo Capture / 64 MP single camera with ZSL / 32+16 MP dual camera with ZSL / 16 MP triple camera with ZSL; Video Capture: 4K@30fps HDR)	LPDDR4X dual-channel 16-bit (32-bit) 2133 MHz (17.0 GB/s) or LPDDR5 dual-channel 16-bit (32-bit) 3200 MHz (25.6 GB/s)	Internal: X62 5G (5G NR Sub-6 & mmWave: download up to 2.9 Gbit/s, upload up to 1.6 Gbit/s; LTE Cat 18: download up to 1.2 Gbit/s, upload up to 210 Mbit/s)	FastConnect 6700; Bluetooth 5.4; 802.11a/b/g/n/ac/ax (Wi-Fi 6E) 2x2 (MU-MIMO) up to 2.9 Gbit/s; GPS, GLONASS, NavIC, Beidou, Galileo, QZSS; USB 3.1	4+	February 12, 2025	Q1 2025
SM6435-AA	Snapdragon 6s Gen 4	4 nm (Samsung 4LPX)	Kryo; 4 + 4 cores (2.4 GHz Cortex-A78 + 1.8 GHz Cortex-A55)	Adreno 710	Hexagon	Spectra (200 MP Photo Capture / 32 MP single camera with ZSL / 16+16 MP dual camera with ZSL; Video Capture: 2K@30fps HDR)	LPDDR4X dual-channel 16-bit (32-bit) 2133 MHz (17.0 GB/s) or LPDDR5 dual-channel 16-bit (32-bit) 3200 MHz (25.6 GB/s)	Internal: X62 5G (5G NR Sub-6 & mmWave: download up to 2.9 Gbit/s, upload up to 1.6 Gbit/s; LTE Cat 18: download up to 1.2 Gbit/s, upload up to 210 Mbit/s)	FastConnect 6700; Bluetooth 5.4; 802.11a/b/g/n/ac/ax (Wi-Fi 6E) 2x2 (MU-MIMO) up to 2.9 Gbit/s; GPS, GLONASS, NavIC, Beidou, Galileo, QZSS; USB 3.1	4+	October 24, 2025	Q4 2025
SM6850	Snapdragon 6 Gen 5	4 nm (TSMC N4P)	Kryo; 4 + 4 cores (2.6 GHz Cortex-A78 + 2.0 GHz Cortex-A55)	Adreno 812	Hexagon	Spectra (200 MP Photo Capture / 64 MP single camera with ZSL / 16+16 MP dual camera with ZSL; Video Capture: 4K@30fps HDR)	LPDDR4X dual-channel 16-bit (32-bit) 2133 MHz (17.0 GB/s) or LPDDR5 dual-channel 16-bit (32-bit) 3200 MHz (25.6 GB/s)	Internal: (5G NR Sub-6: download up to 2.8 Gbit/s)	FastConnect; Bluetooth 6.0; 802.11a/b/g/n/ac/ax/be (Wi-Fi 7) 2x2 (MU-MIMO) up to 5.8 Gbit/s; GPS, GLONASS, NavIC, Beidou, Galileo, QZSS; USB 2.0	5	May 7, 2026	Q2 2026

== Snapdragon 7 series ==
On February 27, 2018, Qualcomm Introduced the Snapdragon 7 Mobile Platform Series. It is an upper mid-range SoC designed to bridge the gap between the 6 series and the 8 series (the predecessor of Snapdragon 7 series is Snapdragon 660), and primarily aimed at premium mid-range segment.

=== Snapdragon 700 series (2018–2022) ===
Model number	Product name	Fab	CPU (ARMv8.2)	GPU	DSP	ISP	Memory technology	Modem	Connectivity	Quick Charge	Announcement date	Sampling availability
SDM710	Snapdragon 710	10 nm (Samsung 10LPP)	2 + 6 cores (2.2 GHz Kryo 360 Gold – Cortex-A75 + 1.7 GHz Kryo 360 Silver – Cortex-A55)	Adreno 616 504 MHz (258 GFLOPS in FP32)	Hexagon 685 (3 TOPS)	Spectra 250 (192 MP single camera / 16 MP dual camera with ZSL; Video Capture: 4K@30fps)	LPDDR4X; Dual-channel 16-bit (32-bit) 1866 MHz (14.9 GB/s)	X15 LTE (download: Cat 15, up to 800 Mbit/s; upload: Cat 13, up to 150 Mbit/s)	Bluetooth 5.0; NFC; 802.11ac 2x2 (MU-MIMO) Wi-Fi up to 867 Mbit/s; GPS, GLONASS, Beidou, Galileo, QZSS, SBAS; USB 3.1	4	May 23, 2018	Q2 2018
SDM712	Snapdragon 712	10 nm (Samsung 10LPP)	2 + 6 cores (2.3 GHz Kryo 360 Gold – Cortex-A75 + 1.7 GHz Kryo 360 Silver – Cortex-A55)	Adreno 616 610 MHz (312.3 GFLOPS in FP32)	Hexagon 685 (3 TOPS)	Spectra 250 (192 MP single camera / 16 MP dual camera with ZSL; Video Capture: 4K@30fps)	LPDDR4X; Dual-channel 16-bit (32-bit) 1866 MHz (14.9 GB/s)	X15 LTE (download: Cat 15, up to 800 Mbit/s; upload: Cat 13, up to 150 Mbit/s)	Bluetooth 5.0; NFC; 802.11ac 2x2 (MU-MIMO) Wi-Fi up to 867 Mbit/s; GPS, GLONASS, Beidou, Galileo, QZSS, SBAS; USB 3.1	4+	February 6, 2019	Q1 2019
SM7125	Snapdragon 720G	8 nm (Samsung 8LPP)	2 + 6 cores (2.3 GHz Kryo 465 Gold – Cortex-A76 + 1.8 GHz Kryo 465 Silver – Cortex-A55)	Adreno 618 750 MHz (384 GFLOPS in FP32)	Hexagon 692 (5 TOPS)	Spectra 350L (192 MP single camera / 16 MP dual camera with ZSL; Video Capture: 4K@30fps)	LPDDR4X; Dual-channel 16-bit (32-bit) 1866 MHz (14.9 GB/s)	X15 LTE (download: Cat 15, up to 800 Mbit/s; upload: Cat 13, up to 150 Mbit/s)	FastConnect 6200; Bluetooth 5.1; NFC; 802.11ac/ax 2x2 (MU-MIMO) Wi-Fi up to 867 Mbit/s; GPS, GLONASS, Beidou, Galileo, QZSS, SBAS, NavIC; USB 3.1	4+	January 20, 2020	Q1 2020
SM7150-AA	Snapdragon 730	8 nm (Samsung 8LPP)	2 + 6 cores (2.2 GHz Kryo 470 Gold – Cortex-A76 + 1.8 GHz Kryo 470 Silver – Cortex-A55)	Adreno 618 610 MHz (312.3 GFLOPS in FP32)	Hexagon 688 (3.6 TOPs)	Spectra 350 (192 MP single camera / 22 MP dual camera with ZSL; Video Capture: 4K@30fps HDR)	LPDDR4X; Dual-channel 16-bit (32-bit) 1866 MHz (14.9 GB/s)	X15 LTE (download: Cat 15, up to 800 Mbit/s; upload: Cat 13, up to 150 Mbit/s)	FastConnect 6200; Bluetooth 5.0; NFC; 802.11ac/ax 2x2 (MU-MIMO) Wi-Fi up to 867 Mbit/s; GPS, GLONASS, Beidou, Galileo, QZSS, SBAS; USB 3.1	4+	April 9, 2019	Q2 2019
SM7150-AB	Snapdragon 730G	8 nm (Samsung 8LPP)	2 + 6 cores (2.2 GHz Kryo 470 Gold – Cortex-A76 + 1.8 GHz Kryo 470 Silver – Cortex-A55)	Adreno 618 700 MHz (358.4 GFLOPS in FP32)	Hexagon 688 (3.6 TOPs)	Spectra 350 (192 MP single camera / 22 MP dual camera with ZSL; Video Capture: 4K@30fps HDR)	LPDDR4X; Dual-channel 16-bit (32-bit) 1866 MHz (14.9 GB/s)	X15 LTE (download: Cat 15, up to 800 Mbit/s; upload: Cat 13, up to 150 Mbit/s)	FastConnect 6200; Bluetooth 5.0; NFC; 802.11ac/ax 2x2 (MU-MIMO) Wi-Fi up to 867 Mbit/s; GPS, GLONASS, Beidou, Galileo, QZSS, SBAS; USB 3.1	4+	April 9, 2019	Q2 2019
SM7150-AC	Snapdragon 732G	8 nm (Samsung 8LPP)	2 + 6 cores (2.3 GHz Kryo 470 Gold – Cortex-A76 + 1.8 GHz Kryo 470 Silver – Cortex-A55)	Adreno 618 800 MHz (409.6 GFLOPS in FP32)	Hexagon 688 (3.6 TOPs)	Spectra 350 (192 MP single camera / 22 MP dual camera with ZSL; Video Capture: 4K@30fps HDR)	LPDDR4X; Dual-channel 16-bit (32-bit) 1866 MHz (14.9 GB/s)	X15 LTE (download: Cat 15, up to 800 Mbit/s; upload: Cat 13, up to 150 Mbit/s)	FastConnect 6200; Bluetooth 5.1; NFC; 802.11ac/ax 2x2 (MU-MIMO) Wi-Fi up to 867 Mbit/s; GPS, GLONASS, Beidou, Galileo, QZSS, SBAS; USB 3.1	4+	August 31, 2020	Q3 2020
SM7225	Snapdragon 750G	8 nm (Samsung 8LPP)	2 + 6 cores (2.2 GHz Kryo 570 Gold – Cortex-A77 + 1.8 GHz Kryo 570 Silver – Cortex-A55)	Adreno 619 800 MHz (409.6 GFLOPS in FP32)	Hexagon 694 (4.7 TOPs)	Spectra 355L (192 MP single camera / 32+16 MP dual camera with ZSL; Video Capture: 4K@30fps HDR)	LPDDR4X Dual-channel 16-bit (32-bit), 2133 MHz (17 GB/s)	Internal X52 5G (5G NR Sub-6 & mmWave: download up to 3.7 Gbit/s, upload up to 1.6 Gbit/s; LTE Cat 18: download up to 1.2 Gbit/s, upload up to 210 Mbit/s)	FastConnect 6200; Bluetooth 5.1; NFC; 802.11ac/ax-ready 2x2 (MU-MIMO); GPS, GLONASS, NavIC, Beidou, Galileo, QZSS, SBAS; USB 3.1	4+	September 22, 2020	Q4 2020
SM7250-AA	Snapdragon 765	7 nm (Samsung 7LPP)	1x 2.3 GHz Kryo 475 Prime (Cortex-A76) + 1x 2.2 GHz Kryo 475 Gold (Cortex-A76) + 6x 1.8 GHz Kryo 475 Silver (Cortex-A55)	Adreno 620 540 MHz (414.7 GFLOPS in FP32)	Hexagon 696 (5.4 TOPs)	Spectra 355 (192 MP Photo Capture / 36 MP single camera with ZSL / 22 MP dual camera with ZSL; Video Capture: 4K@30fps HDR)	LPDDR4X Dual-channel 16-bit (32-bit), 2133 MHz (17 GB/s)	Internal X52 5G (5G NR Sub-6 & mmWave: download up to 3.7 Gbit/s, upload up to 1.6 Gbit/s; LTE Cat 18: download up to 1.2 Gbit/s, upload up to 210 Mbit/s)	FastConnect 6200; Bluetooth 5.0; NFC; 802.11ac/ax 2x2 (MU-MIMO) up to 867 Mbit/s; GPS, GLONASS, NavIC, Beidou, Galileo, QZSS, SBAS; USB 3.1	4+	December 4, 2019	Q1 2020
SM7250-AB	Snapdragon 765G	7 nm (Samsung 7LPP)	1x 2.4 GHz Kryo 475 Prime (Cortex-A76) + 1x 2.2 GHz Kryo 475 Gold (Cortex-A76) + 6x 1.8 GHz Kryo 475 Silver (Cortex-A55)	Adreno 620 625 MHz (480 GFLOPS in FP32)	Hexagon 696 (5.4 TOPs)	Spectra 355 (192 MP Photo Capture / 36 MP single camera with ZSL / 22 MP dual camera with ZSL; Video Capture: 4K@30fps HDR)	LPDDR4X Dual-channel 16-bit (32-bit), 2133 MHz (17 GB/s)	Internal X52 5G (5G NR Sub-6 & mmWave: download up to 3.7 Gbit/s, upload up to 1.6 Gbit/s; LTE Cat 18: download up to 1.2 Gbit/s, upload up to 210 Mbit/s)	FastConnect 6200; Bluetooth 5.0; NFC; 802.11ac/ax 2x2 (MU-MIMO) up to 867 Mbit/s; GPS, GLONASS, NavIC, Beidou, Galileo, QZSS, SBAS; USB 3.1	4+	December 4, 2019	Q1 2020
SM7250-AC	Snapdragon 768G	7 nm (Samsung 7LPP)	1x 2.8 GHz Kryo 475 Prime (Cortex-A76) + 1x 2.4 GHz Kryo 475 Gold (Cortex-A76) + 6x 1.8 GHz Kryo 475 Silver (Cortex-A55)	Adreno 620 750 MHz (576 GFLOPS in FP32)	Hexagon 696 (5.4 TOPs)	Spectra 355 (192 MP Photo Capture / 36 MP single camera with ZSL / 22 MP dual camera with ZSL; Video Capture: 4K@30fps HDR)	LPDDR4X Dual-channel 16-bit (32-bit), 2133 MHz (17 GB/s)	Internal X52 5G (5G NR Sub-6 & mmWave: download up to 3.7 Gbit/s, upload up to 1.6 Gbit/s; LTE Cat 18: download up to 1.2 Gbit/s, upload up to 210 Mbit/s)	FastConnect 6200; Bluetooth 5.2; NFC; 802.11ac/ax 2x2 (MU-MIMO) up to 867 Mbit/s; GPS, GLONASS, NavIC, Beidou, Galileo, QZSS, SBAS; USB 3.1	4+	May 10, 2020	Q2 2020
SM7325	Snapdragon 778G	6 nm (TSMC N6)	1x 2.4 GHz Kryo 670 Prime (Cortex-A78) + 3x 2.4 GHz Kryo 670 Gold (Cortex-A78) + 4x 1.8 GHz Kryo 670 Silver (Cortex-A55)	Adreno 642L 550 MHz (563.2 GFLOPS in FP32)	Hexagon 770 (12 TOPs)	Spectra 570L (200 MP Photo Capture / 64 MP single camera with ZSL / 36+22 MP dual camera with ZSL / 22 MP triple camera with ZSL; Video Capture: 4K@30fps HDR)	LPDDR5 Dual-channel 16-bit (32-bit) 3200 MHz (25.6 GB/s)	Internal: X53 5G (5G NR Sub-6 & mmWave: download up to 3.7 Gbit/s, upload up to 1.6 Gbit/s; LTE Cat 18: download up to 1.2 Gbit/s, upload up to 210 Mbit/s)	FastConnect 6700; Bluetooth 5.2; 802.11ac/ax (Wi-Fi 6E) 2x2 (MU-MIMO) up to 2.9 Gbit/s; GPS, GLONASS, NavIC, Beidou, Galileo, QZSS; USB 3.1	4+	May 19, 2021	Q2 2021
SM7325-AE	Snapdragon 778G+	6 nm (TSMC N6)	1x 2.5 GHz Kryo 670 Prime (Cortex-A78) + 3x 2.4 GHz Kryo 670 Gold (Cortex-A78) + 4x 1.8 GHz Kryo 670 Silver (Cortex-A55)	Adreno 642L 608 MHz (622.6 GFLOPS in FP32)	Hexagon 770 (12 TOPs)	Spectra 570L (200 MP Photo Capture / 64 MP single camera with ZSL / 36+22 MP dual camera with ZSL / 22 MP triple camera with ZSL; Video Capture: 4K@30fps HDR)	LPDDR5 Dual-channel 16-bit (32-bit) 3200 MHz (25.6 GB/s)	Internal: X53 5G (5G NR Sub-6 & mmWave: download up to 3.7 Gbit/s, upload up to 1.6 Gbit/s; LTE Cat 18: download up to 1.2 Gbit/s, upload up to 210 Mbit/s)	FastConnect 6700; Bluetooth 5.2; 802.11ac/ax (Wi-Fi 6E) 2x2 (MU-MIMO) up to 2.9 Gbit/s; GPS, GLONASS, NavIC, Beidou, Galileo, QZSS; USB 3.1	4+	October 26, 2021	Q4 2021
SM7350-AB	Snapdragon 780G	5 nm (Samsung 5LPE)	1x 2.4 GHz Kryo 670 Prime (Cortex-A78) + 3x 2.2 GHz Kryo 670 Gold (Cortex-A78) + 4x 1.9 GHz Kryo 670 Silver (Cortex-A55)	Adreno 642 490 MHz (752.6 GFLOPS in FP32)	Hexagon 770 (12 TOPs)	Spectra 570 (192 MP Photo Capture / 84 MP single camera with ZSL / 64+20 MP dual camera with ZSL / 25 MP triple camera with ZSL; Video Capture: 4K@30fps HDR)	LPDDR4X; Dual-channel 16-bit (32-bit) 2133 MHz (17 GB/s)	Internal: X53 5G (5G NR Sub-6: download up to 3.3 Gbit/s, upload up to 1.6 Gbit/s; LTE Cat 18: download up to 1.2 Gbit/s, upload up to 210 Mbit/s)	FastConnect 6900; Bluetooth 5.2; 802.11ac/ax (Wi-Fi 6E) 2x2 (MU-MIMO) up to 3.6 Gbit/s; GPS, GLONASS, NavIC, Beidou, Galileo, QZSS; USB 3.1	4+	March 25, 2021	Q1 2021
SM7325-AF	Snapdragon 782G	6 nm (TSMC N6)	1x 2.7 GHz Kryo 670 Prime (Cortex-A78) + 3x 2.4 GHz Kryo 670 Gold (Cortex-A78) + 4x 1.8 GHz Kryo 670 Silver (Cortex-A55)	Adreno 642L 719 MHz (736.3 GFLOPS in FP32)	Hexagon 770 (12 TOPs)	Spectra 570L (200 MP Photo Capture / 64 MP single camera with ZSL / 36+22 MP dual camera with ZSL / 22 MP triple camera with ZSL; Video Capture: 4K@30fps HDR)	LPDDR5; Dual-channel 16-bit (32-bit) 3200 MHz (25.6 GB/s)	Internal: X53 5G (5G NR Sub-6 & mmWave: download up to 3.7 Gbit/s, upload up to 1.6 Gbit/s; LTE Cat 18: download up to 1.2 Gbit/s, upload up to 210 Mbit/s)	FastConnect 6700; Bluetooth 5.2; 802.11ac/ax (Wi-Fi 6) 2x2 (MU-MIMO) up to 2.9 Gbit/s; GPS, GLONASS, NavIC, Beidou, Galileo, QZSS; USB 3.1	4+	November 23, 2022	Q4 2022

=== Snapdragon 7 (since 2022) ===
Model number	Product name	Fab	Die size	CPU (Cores / Freq)	GPU	DSP	ISP	Memory technology	Modem	Connectivity	Quick Charge	Announcement date	Sampling availability
SM7450-AB	Snapdragon 7 Gen 1	4 nm (Samsung 4LPX)	77.8mm^{2}	Kryo (1× 2.4 GHz {2.5 GHz Accelerated Edition} Cortex-A710 + 3× 2.36 GHz Cortex-A710 + 4× 1.8 GHz Cortex-A510)	Adreno 644 443 MHz (680.4 GFLOPS in FP32)	Hexagon	Spectra (200 MP Photo Capture / 84 MP single camera with ZSL / 64+20 MP dual camera with ZSL / 25 MP triple camera with ZSL; Video Capture: 4K@30fps HDR)	LPDDR5 Dual-channel 16-bit (32-bit) 3200 MHz (25.6 GB/s)	Internal: X62 5G (5G NR Sub-6 & mmWave: download up to 4.4 Gbit/s, upload up to 1.6 Gbit/s; LTE Cat 18: download up to 1.2 Gbit/s, upload up to 210 Mbit/s)	FastConnect 6700; Bluetooth 5.2; 802.11a/b/g/n/ac/ax (Wi-Fi 6E) 2x2 (MU-MIMO) up to 2.9 Gbit/s; GPS, GLONASS, NavIC, Beidou, Galileo, QZSS; USB 3.1	4+	May 20, 2022	Q2 2022
SM7475-AB	Snapdragon 7+ Gen 2	4 nm (TSMC N4)	102.6 mm^{2}	Kryo (1× 2.91 GHz Cortex-X2 + 3× 2.49 GHz Cortex-A710 + 4× 1.8 GHz Cortex-A510)	Adreno 725 580 MHz (1187.8 GFLOPS in FP32)	Hexagon	Spectra (200 MP Photo Capture / 108 MP single camera with ZSL / 64+36 MP dual camera with ZSL / 32 MP triple camera with ZSL; Video Capture: 4K@60fps HDR)	LPDDR5 Quad-channel 16-bit (64-bit) 3200 MHz (51.2 GB/s)	Internal: X62 5G (5G NR Sub-6 & mmWave: download up to 4.4 Gbit/s, upload up to 1.6 Gbit/s; LTE Cat 18: download up to 1.2 Gbit/s, upload up to 210 Mbit/s)	FastConnect 6900; Bluetooth 5.3; 802.11a/b/g/n/ac/ax (Wi-Fi 6E) 2x2 (MU-MIMO) up to 3.6 Gbit/s; GPS, GLONASS, NavIC, Beidou, Galileo, QZSS; USB 3.1	5	March 17, 2023	Q1 2023
SM7435-AB	Snapdragon 7s Gen 2	4 nm (Samsung 4LPX)		Kryo; 4 + 4 cores (2.4 GHz Cortex-A78 + 1.95 GHz Cortex-A55)	Adreno 710 940 MHz (481.3 GFLOPS in FP32)	Hexagon	Spectra (200 MP Photo Capture / 48 MP single camera with ZSL / 32+16 MP dual camera with ZSL / 16 MP triple camera with ZSL; Video Capture: 4K@30fps HDR)	LPDDR4X dual-channel 16-bit (32-bit) 2133 MHz (17.0 GB/s) or LPDDR5 dual-channel 16-bit (32-bit) 3200 MHz (25.6 GB/s)	Internal: X62 5G (5G NR Sub-6 & mmWave: download up to 2.9 Gbit/s, upload up to 1.6 Gbit/s; LTE Cat 18: download up to 1.2 Gbit/s, upload up to 210 Mbit/s)	FastConnect 6700; Bluetooth 5.2; 802.11a/b/g/n/ac/ax (Wi-Fi 6E) 2x2 (MU-MIMO) up to 2.9 Gbit/s; GPS, GLONASS, NavIC, Beidou, Galileo, QZSS; USB 3.1	4+	September 15, 2023	Q3 2023
SM7550-AB	Snapdragon 7 Gen 3	4 nm (TSMC N4P)	55.16 mm^{2}	Kryo (1× 2.63 GHz Cortex-A715 + 3× 2.4 GHz Cortex-A715 + 4× 1.8 GHz Cortex-A510)	Adreno 720 975 MHz (998.4 GFLOPS in FP32)	Hexagon	Spectra (200 MP Photo Capture / 64 MP single camera with ZSL / 32+21 MP dual camera with ZSL / 21 MP triple camera with ZSL; Video Capture: 4K@60fps HDR)	LPDDR4X dual-channel 16-bit (32-bit) 2133 MHz (17.0 GB/s) or LPDDR5 dual-channel 16-bit (32-bit) 3200 MHz (25.6 GB/s)	Internal: X63 5G (5G NR Sub-6 & mmWave: download up to 5 Gbit/s, upload up to 3.5 Gbit/s)	FastConnect 6700; Bluetooth 5.4; 802.11a/b/g/n/ac/ax (Wi-Fi 6E) 2x2 (MU-MIMO) up to 2.9 Gbit/s; GPS, GLONASS, NavIC, Beidou, Galileo, QZSS; USB 3.1	5	November 17, 2023	Q4 2023
SM7675-AB	Snapdragon 7+ Gen 3	4 nm (TSMC N4P)	89.54 mm^{2}	Kryo (1× 2.8 GHz Cortex-X4 + 4× 2.6 GHz Cortex-A720 + 3× 1.9 GHz Cortex-A520)	Adreno 732 950 MHz (1459.2 GFLOPS in FP32)	Hexagon	Spectra (200 MP Photo Capture / 108 MP single camera with ZSL / 64+36 MP dual camera with ZSL / 36 MP triple camera with ZSL; Video Capture: 4K@60fps HDR)	LPDDR5X quad-channel 16-bit (64-bit) 4200 MHz (67.2 GB/s)	Internal: X63 5G (5G NR Sub-6 & mmWave: download up to 5 Gbit/s, upload up to 3.5 Gbit/s)	FastConnect 7800; Bluetooth 5.4; 802.11a/b/g/n/ac/ax/be (Wi-Fi 7) 2x2 (MU-MIMO) up to 5.8 Gbit/s; GPS, GLONASS, NavIC, Beidou, Galileo, QZSS; USB 3.1	5	March 21, 2024	Q1 2024
SM7635	Snapdragon 7s Gen 3	4 nm (TSMC N4P)		Kryo (1× 2.5 GHz Cortex-A720 + 3× 2.4 GHz Cortex-A720 + 4× 1.8 GHz Cortex-A520)	Adreno 810 1050 MHz (537.6 GFLOPS in FP32)	Hexagon	Spectra (200 MP Photo Capture / 64 MP single camera with ZSL / 32+21 MP dual camera with ZSL / 21 MP triple camera with ZSL; Video Capture: 4K@30fps HDR)	LPDDR4X dual-channel 16-bit (32-bit) 2133 MHz (17.0 GB/s) or LPDDR5 dual-channel 16-bit (32-bit) 3200 MHz (25.6 GB/s)	Internal: X62 5G (5G NR Sub-6 & mmWave: download up to 2.9 Gbit/s, upload up to 1.6 Gbit/s; LTE Cat 18: download up to 1.2 Gbit/s, upload up to 210 Mbit/s)	FastConnect 6700; Bluetooth 5.4; 802.11a/b/g/n/ac/ax (Wi-Fi 6E) 2x2 (MU-MIMO) up to 2.9 Gbit/s; GPS, GLONASS, NavIC, Beidou, Galileo, QZSS; USB 3.1	4+	August 20, 2024	Q3 2024
SM7750-AB	Snapdragon 7 Gen 4	4 nm (TSMC N4P)	70.35 mm^{2}	Kryo (1× 2.8 GHz Cortex-A720 + 4× 2.4 GHz Cortex-A720 + 3× 1.84 GHz Cortex-A520)	Adreno 722 1150 MHz (1177.6 GFLOPS in FP32)	Hexagon	Spectra (200 MP Photo Capture / 64 MP single camera with ZSL / 32+21 MP dual camera with ZSL / 21 MP triple camera with ZSL; Video Capture: 4K@60fps HDR)	LPDDR4X dual-channel 16-bit (32-bit) 2133 MHz (17.0 GB/s) or LPDDR5 dual-channel 16-bit (32-bit) 3200 MHz (25.6 GB/s) or LPDDR5X dual-channel 16-bit (32-bit) 4200 MHz (33.6 GB/s)	Internal (5G NR Sub-6: download up to 4.2 Gbit/s)	FastConnect 7700; Bluetooth 6.0; 802.11a/b/g/n/ac/ax/be (Wi-Fi 7) 2x2 (MU-MIMO) up to 5.8 Gbit/s; GPS, GLONASS, NavIC, Beidou, Galileo, QZSS; USB 3.1	5	May 15, 2025	Q2 2025
SM7635-AC	Snapdragon 7s Gen 4	4 nm (TSMC N4P)		Kryo (1× 2.7 GHz Cortex-A720 + 3× 2.4 GHz Cortex-A720 + 4× 1.8 GHz Cortex-A520)	Adreno 810 1150 MHz (588.8 GFLOPS in FP32)	Hexagon	Spectra (200 MP Photo Capture / 64 MP single camera with ZSL / 32+21 MP dual camera with ZSL / 21 MP triple camera with ZSL; Video Capture: 4K@30fps HDR)	LPDDR4X dual-channel 16-bit (32-bit) 2133 MHz (17.0 GB/s) or LPDDR5 dual-channel 16-bit (32-bit) 3200 MHz (25.6 GB/s)	Internal: X62 5G (5G NR Sub-6 & mmWave: download up to 2.9 Gbit/s, upload up to 1.6 Gbit/s; LTE Cat 18: download up to 1.2 Gbit/s, upload up to 210 Mbit/s)	FastConnect 6700; Bluetooth 5.4; 802.11a/b/g/n/ac/ax (Wi-Fi 6E) 2x2 (MU-MIMO) up to 2.9 Gbit/s; GPS, GLONASS, NavIC, Beidou, Galileo, QZSS; USB 3.1	4+	August 19, 2025	Q3 2025

== Snapdragon 8 series ==
The Snapdragon 8 series is the high-end SoC and serves as Qualcomm's current flagship, succeeding the S4 Pro and the older S1/S2/S3 series.

=== Snapdragon 800 series (2013–2021) ===
Model number	Product name	Fab	Die size	CPU	GPU	DSP	ISP	Memory technology	Modem	Connectivity	Quick Charge	Announcement date	Sampling availability
APQ8074AA	Snapdragon; 800	28 nm (TSMC; 28HPM)	118.57 mm^{2}	4 cores 2.26 GHz; Krait 400; 4 KiB + 4 KiB L0 cache, 16 KiB + 16 KiB L1 cache and 2 MiB L2 cache	Adreno 330; 450 MHz (115.2; GFLOPS in FP32)	Hexagon; QDSP6 V5; 600 MHz	21 MP single camera (Video capture: 4K@30fps)	LPDDR3; Dual-channel; 32-bit 800 MHz (12.8 GB/s)	—N/a	Bluetooth 4.0; 802.11ac (2.4/5 GHz); IZat Gen8B	2.0	January 8, 2013	Q2 2013
MSM8274AA	Snapdragon; 800	28 nm (TSMC; 28HPM)	118.57 mm^{2}	4 cores 2.26 GHz; Krait 400; 4 KiB + 4 KiB L0 cache, 16 KiB + 16 KiB L1 cache and 2 MiB L2 cache	Adreno 330; 450 MHz (115.2; GFLOPS in FP32)	Hexagon; QDSP6 V5; 600 MHz	21 MP single camera (Video capture: 4K@30fps)	LPDDR3; Dual-channel; 32-bit 800 MHz (12.8 GB/s)	Gobi 3G (UMTS)	Bluetooth 4.0; 802.11ac (2.4/5 GHz); IZat Gen8B	2.0	January 8, 2013	Q2 2013
MSM8674AA	Snapdragon; 800	28 nm (TSMC; 28HPM)	118.57 mm^{2}	4 cores 2.26 GHz; Krait 400; 4 KiB + 4 KiB L0 cache, 16 KiB + 16 KiB L1 cache and 2 MiB L2 cache	Adreno 330; 450 MHz (115.2; GFLOPS in FP32)	Hexagon; QDSP6 V5; 600 MHz	21 MP single camera (Video capture: 4K@30fps)	LPDDR3; Dual-channel; 32-bit 800 MHz (12.8 GB/s)	Gobi 3G (CDMA, UMTS)	Bluetooth 4.0; 802.11ac (2.4/5 GHz); IZat Gen8B	2.0	January 8, 2013	Q2 2013
MSM8974AA	Snapdragon; 800	28 nm (TSMC; 28HPM)	118.57 mm^{2}	4 cores 2.26 GHz; Krait 400; 4 KiB + 4 KiB L0 cache, 16 KiB + 16 KiB L1 cache and 2 MiB L2 cache	Adreno 330; 450 MHz (115.2; GFLOPS in FP32)	Hexagon; QDSP6 V5; 600 MHz	21 MP single camera (Video capture: 4K@30fps)	LPDDR3; Dual-channel; 32-bit 800 MHz (12.8 GB/s)	Gobi 4G (LTE Cat 4: download 150 Mbit/s, upload 50 Mbit/s	Bluetooth 4.0; 802.11ac (2.4/5 GHz); IZat Gen8B	2.0	January 8, 2013	Q2 2013
MSM8974AA v3	Snapdragon; 801	28 nm (TSMC; 28HPM)	118.57 mm^{2}	4 cores 2.26 GHz; Krait 400; 4 KiB + 4 KiB L0 cache, 16 KiB + 16 KiB L1 cache and 2 MiB L2 cache	Adreno 330; 450 MHz (115.2; GFLOPS in FP32)	Hexagon; QDSP6 V5; 600 MHz	21 MP single camera (Video capture: 4K@30fps)	LPDDR3; Dual-channel; 32-bit 800 MHz (12.8 GB/s)	Gobi 4G (LTE Cat 4)	Bluetooth 4.0; 802.11ac (2.4/5 GHz); IZat Gen8B	2.0	February 24, 2014	Q3 2014
APQ8074AB v3	Snapdragon; 801	28 nm (TSMC; 28HPM)	118.57 mm^{2}	4 cores 2.36 GHz; Krait 400	Adreno 330; 578 MHz (150 GFLOPS in FP32)	Hexagon; QDSP6 V5; 600 MHz	21 MP single camera (Video capture: 4K@30fps)	LPDDR3; Dual-channel; 32-bit 933 MHz (14.9 GB/s)	—N/a	Bluetooth 4.0; 802.11ac (2.4/5 GHz); IZat Gen8B	2.0	February 24, 2014	Q4 2013
MSM8274AB	Snapdragon; 800	28 nm (TSMC; 28HPM)	118.57 mm^{2}	4 cores 2.36 GHz; Krait 400	Adreno 330; 578 MHz (150 GFLOPS in FP32)	Hexagon; QDSP6 V5; 600 MHz	21 MP single camera (Video capture: 4K@30fps)	LPDDR3; Dual-channel; 32-bit 933 MHz (14.9 GB/s)	Gobi 3G (UMTS)	Bluetooth 4.0; 802.11ac (2.4/5 GHz); IZat Gen8B	2.0	January 8, 2013	Q4 2013
MSM8674AB v3	Snapdragon; 801	28 nm (TSMC; 28HPM)	118.57 mm^{2}	4 cores 2.36 GHz; Krait 400	Adreno 330; 578 MHz (150 GFLOPS in FP32)	Hexagon; QDSP6 V5; 600 MHz	21 MP single camera (Video capture: 4K@30fps)	LPDDR3; Dual-channel; 32-bit 933 MHz (14.9 GB/s)	Gobi 3G (CDMA, UMTS)	Bluetooth 4.0; 802.11ac (2.4/5 GHz); IZat Gen8B	2.0	February 24, 2014	Q2 2013
MSM8974AB v3	Snapdragon; 801	28 nm (TSMC; 28HPM)	118.57 mm^{2}	4 cores 2.36 GHz; Krait 400	Adreno 330; 578 MHz (150 GFLOPS in FP32)	Hexagon; QDSP6 V5; 600 MHz	21 MP single camera (Video capture: 4K@30fps)	LPDDR3; Dual-channel; 32-bit 933 MHz (14.9 GB/s)	Gobi 4G (LTE Cat 4)	Bluetooth 4.0; 802.11ac (2.4/5 GHz); IZat Gen8B	2.0	February 24, 2014	Q4 2013
MSM8274AC v3	Snapdragon; 801	28 nm (TSMC; 28HPM)	118.57 mm^{2}	4 cores 2.45 GHz Krait 400	Adreno 330; 578 MHz (150 GFLOPS in FP32)	Hexagon; QDSP6 V5; 600 MHz	21 MP single camera (Video capture: 4K@30fps)	LPDDR3; Dual-channel; 32-bit 933 MHz (14.9 GB/s)	Gobi 3G (UMTS)	Bluetooth 4.0; 802.11ac (2.4/5 GHz); IZat Gen8B	2.0	February 24, 2014	Q2 2014
MSM8974AC v3	Snapdragon; 801	28 nm (TSMC; 28HPM)	118.57 mm^{2}	4 cores 2.45 GHz Krait 400	Adreno 330; 578 MHz (150 GFLOPS in FP32)	Hexagon; QDSP6 V5; 600 MHz	21 MP single camera (Video capture: 4K@30fps)	LPDDR3; Dual-channel; 32-bit 933 MHz (14.9 GB/s)	Gobi 4G (LTE Cat 4)	Bluetooth 4.0; 802.11ac (2.4/5 GHz); IZat Gen8B	2.0	February 24, 2014	Q1 2014
APQ8084	Snapdragon; 805	28 nm (TSMC; 28HPM)	134.69 mm^{2}	4 cores 2.7 GHz Krait 450	Adreno 420; 600 MHz (153.6; GFLOPS in FP32)	Hexagon V50 800 MHz	55 MP single camera (Video capture: 4K@30fps)	LPDDR3; Dual-channel; 64-bit 800 MHz (25.6 GB/s)	External	Bluetooth 4.1; 802.11ac (2.4/5 GHz); IZat Gen8B	2.0	November 20, 2013	Q1 2014
MSM8992	Snapdragon; 808	20 nm (TSMC)	94.35 mm^{2}	2 + 4 cores (1.82 GHz Cortex-A57 + 1.44 GHz Cortex-A53)	Adreno 418; 600 MHz (153.6; GFLOPS in FP32)	Hexagon; V56; 800 MHz	Up to 21 MP single camera (Video capture: 4K@30fps)	LPDDR3; Dual-channel; 32-bit 933 MHz (14.9 GB/s)	X10 LTE (Cat 9: download 450 Mbit/s, upload 50 Mbit/s)	Bluetooth 4.1; 802.11ac IZat Gen8C	2.0	April 7, 2014	Q3 2014
MSM8994 v1	Snapdragon; 810	20 nm (TSMC)	142 mm^{2}	4 + 4 cores (1.958 GHz Cortex-A57 + 1.555 GHz Cortex-A53)	Adreno 430; 600 MHz (230.4; GFLOPS in FP32)	Hexagon; V56; 800 MHz	55 MP single camera (Video capture: 4K@30fps)	LPDDR4; Dual-channel; 32-bit 1600 MHz (25.6 GB/s)	X10 LTE (Cat 9: download 450 Mbit/s, upload 50 Mbit/s)	Bluetooth 4.1; 802.11ac IZat Gen8C	2.0	April 7, 2014	Q3 2014
MSM8994 v2	Snapdragon; 810	20 nm (TSMC)	142 mm^{2}	4 + 4 cores (1.958 GHz Cortex-A57 + 1.555 GHz Cortex-A53)	Adreno 430; 630 MHz (241.9; GFLOPS in FP32)	Hexagon; V56; 800 MHz	55 MP single camera (Video capture: 4K@30fps)	LPDDR4; Dual-channel; 32-bit 1600 MHz (25.6 GB/s)	X10 LTE (Cat 9: download 450 Mbit/s, upload 50 Mbit/s)	Bluetooth 4.1; 802.11ac IZat Gen8C	2.0	April 7, 2014	2015
MSM8994 v2.1	Snapdragon; 810	20 nm (TSMC)	142 mm^{2}	4 + 4 cores (1.958 GHz Cortex-A57 + 1.555 GHz Cortex-A53)	Adreno 430; 630 MHz (241.9; GFLOPS in FP32)	Hexagon; V56; 800 MHz	55 MP single camera (Video capture: 4K@30fps)	LPDDR4; Dual-channel; 32-bit 1600 MHz (25.6 GB/s)	X10 LTE (Cat 9: download 450 Mbit/s, upload 50 Mbit/s)	Bluetooth 4.1; 802.11ac IZat Gen8C	2.0	April 7, 2014	Q2 2015
MSM8996 Lite	Snapdragon; 820	14 nm FinFET (Samsung; 14LPP)	113.7 mm^{2}	2 + 2 cores Kryo (1.8 GHz + 1.36 GHz)	Adreno 530; 510 MHz (261.1; GFLOPS in FP32)	Hexagon 680; 1.0 GHz	Spectra (28 MP Photo Capture / 25 MP at 30fps single camera with ZSL / 13 MP Dual Camera with ZSL; Video capture: 4K@30fps)	LPDDR4; Quad-channel; 16-bit (64-bit); 1333 MHz (21.3 GB/s)	X12 LTE (download: Cat 12, 600 Mbit/s; 3x20 MHz CA; 64-QAM; 4x4 MIMO on 1C. upload: Cat 13, 150 Mbit/s; 2x20 MHz CA; 64-QAM.)	Bluetooth 4.1; 802.11ac IZat Gen8C	3.0	March 2, 2015	Q1 2016
MSM8996	Snapdragon; 820	14 nm FinFET (Samsung; 14LPP)	113.7 mm^{2}	2 + 2 cores Kryo (2.15 GHz + 1.593 GHz)	Adreno 530 624 MHz (319.5 GFLOPS in FP32)	Hexagon 680; 1.0 GHz	Spectra (28 MP Photo Capture / 25 MP at 30fps single camera with ZSL / 13 MP Dual Camera with ZSL; Video capture: 4K@30fps)	LPDDR4; Quad-channel; 16-bit (64-bit); 1866 MHz (29.8 GB/s)	X12 LTE (download: Cat 12, 600 Mbit/s; 3x20 MHz CA; 64-QAM; 4x4 MIMO on 1C. upload: Cat 13, 150 Mbit/s; 2x20 MHz CA; 64-QAM.)	Bluetooth 4.1; 802.11ac IZat Gen8C	3.0	March 2, 2015	Q4 2015
MSM8996 Pro-AB	Snapdragon; 821	14 nm FinFET (Samsung; 14LPP)	113.7 mm^{2}	2 + 2 cores Kryo (2.15 GHz + 1.593 GHz)	Adreno 530 624 MHz (319.5 GFLOPS in FP32)	Hexagon 680; 1.0 GHz	Spectra (28 MP Photo Capture / 25 MP at 30fps single camera with ZSL / 13 MP Dual Camera with ZSL; Video capture: 4K@30fps)	LPDDR4; Quad-channel; 16-bit (64-bit); 1866 MHz (29.8 GB/s)	X12 LTE (download: Cat 12, 600 Mbit/s; 3x20 MHz CA; 64-QAM; 4x4 MIMO on 1C. upload: Cat 13, 150 Mbit/s; 2x20 MHz CA; 64-QAM.)	Bluetooth 4.1; 802.11ac IZat Gen8C	3.0	July 11, 2016	Q3 2016
MSM8996 Pro-AC	Snapdragon; 821	14 nm FinFET (Samsung; 14LPP)	113.7 mm^{2}	2 + 2 cores Kryo (2.342 GHz + 1.6/2.188 GHz)	Adreno 530 653 MHz (334.3 GFLOPS in FP32)	Hexagon 680; 1.0 GHz	Spectra (28 MP Photo Capture / 25 MP at 30fps single camera with ZSL / 13 MP Dual Camera with ZSL; Video capture: 4K@30fps)	LPDDR4; Quad-channel; 16-bit (64-bit); 1866 MHz (29.8 GB/s)	X12 LTE (download: Cat 12, 600 Mbit/s; 3x20 MHz CA; 64-QAM; 4x4 MIMO on 1C. upload: Cat 13, 150 Mbit/s; 2x20 MHz CA; 64-QAM.)	Bluetooth 4.1; 802.11ac IZat Gen8C	3.0	July 11, 2016	Q3 2016
MSM8998	Snapdragon; 835	10 nm FinFET (Samsung; 10LPE)	72.3 mm^{2}	4 + 4 cores Kryo 280 (2.45 GHz Cortex-A73 + 1.9 GHz Cortex-A53)	Adreno 540 670/710 MHz (343/363.5 GFLOPS in FP32)	Hexagon 682	Spectra 180 (32 MP Photo capture / 25 MP at 30fps single camera with ZSL / 16 MP Dual Camera with ZSL; Video capture: 4K@30fps)	LPDDR4X Dual-channel 32-bit (64-bit) 1866 MHz (29.8 GB/s)	X16 LTE (download: Cat 16, up to 1000 Mbit/s; 4x20 MHz CA; 256-QAM; 4x4 MIMO on 2C. upload: Cat 13, up to 150 Mbit/s)	Bluetooth 5.0; 802.11ac/ad; GPS, Glonass, Beidou, Galileo, QZSS, SBAS	4.0	November 17, 2016	Q2 2017
SDM845	Snapdragon; 845	10 nm FinFET (Samsung; 10LPP)	95.0 mm^{2}	4 + 4 cores Kryo 385 (2.8 GHz Cortex-A75 + 1.8 GHz Cortex-A55)	Adreno 630 710 MHz (727 GFLOPS in FP32)	Hexagon 685 (3 TOPs)	Spectra 280 (192 MP Photo capture / 48 MP single camera with MFNR / 32 MP at 30fps single camera with MFNR/ZSL / 16 MP at 60fps single camera with MFNR/ZSL / 16 MP at 30fps Dual Camera with MFNR/ZSL; Video capture: 4K@60fps)	LPDDR4X Dual-channel 32-bit (64-bit) 1866 MHz (29.8 GB/s)	X20 LTE (download: Cat 18, @ 1200 Mbit/s; 5x20 MHz CA; 256-QAM; 4x4 MIMO on 3C. upload: Cat 13, @ 150 Mbit/s; 2x20 MHz CA; 64-QAM)	Bluetooth 5.0; 802.11ac/ad; GPS, Glonass, Beidou, Galileo, QZSS, SBAS	4+	December 7, 2017	Q1 2018
SM8150	Snapdragon; 855	7 nm (TSMC; N7)	76.9 mm^{2}	1 + 3 + 4 cores Kryo 485 (2.84 GHz Cortex-A76 + 2.42 GHz Cortex-A76 + 1.8 GHz Cortex-A55)	Adreno 640 585 MHz (898.6 GFLOPS in FP32)	Hexagon 690 (7 TOPs)	Spectra 380 (192 MP single camera / 48 MP at 30 fps single camera with MFNR/ZSL / 22 MP at 30 fps dual camera with MFNR/ZSL; Video capture: 4K@60fps HDR)	LPDDR4X Quad-channel 16-bit (64-bit) 2133 MHz (34.13 GB/s)	Internal: X24 LTE (Cat 20: download up to 2 Gbit/s, 7x20 MHz CA, 256-QAM, 4x4 MIMO on 5C. Upload up to 316 Mbit/s, 3x20 MHz CA, 256-QAM) + External: X50 5G (5G NR Sub-6 & mmWave: download up to 5 Gbit/s)	Bluetooth 5.0; 802.11ax (Wi-Fi 6); GPS, Glonass, Beidou, Galileo, QZSS, SBAS; USB 3.1	4+	December 5, 2018	Q1 2019
SM8150-AC	Snapdragon; 855+	7 nm (TSMC; N7)	76.9 mm^{2}	1 + 3 + 4 cores Kryo 485 (2.96 GHz Cortex-A76 + 2.42 GHz Cortex-A76 + 1.80 GHz Cortex-A55)	Adreno 640 675 MHz (1036.8 GFLOPS in FP32)	Hexagon 690 (7 TOPs)	Spectra 380 (192 MP single camera / 48 MP at 30 fps single camera with MFNR/ZSL / 22 MP at 30 fps dual camera with MFNR/ZSL; Video capture: 4K@60fps HDR)	LPDDR4X Quad-channel 16-bit (64-bit) 2133 MHz (34.13 GB/s)	Internal: X24 LTE (Cat 20: download up to 2 Gbit/s, 7x20 MHz CA, 256-QAM, 4x4 MIMO on 5C. Upload up to 316 Mbit/s, 3x20 MHz CA, 256-QAM) + External: X50 5G (5G NR Sub-6 & mmWave: download up to 5 Gbit/s)	Bluetooth 5.0; 802.11ax (Wi-Fi 6); GPS, Glonass, Beidou, Galileo, QZSS, SBAS; USB 3.1	4+	July 15, 2019	Q3 2019
SM8150-AC	Snapdragon; 860	7 nm (TSMC; N7)	76.9 mm^{2}	1 + 3 + 4 cores Kryo 485 (2.96 GHz Cortex-A76 + 2.42 GHz Cortex-A76 + 1.80 GHz Cortex-A55)	Adreno 640 675 MHz (1036.8 GFLOPS in FP32)	Hexagon 690 (7 TOPs)	Spectra 380 (192 MP single camera / 48 MP at 30 fps single camera with MFNR/ZSL / 22 MP at 30 fps dual camera with MFNR/ZSL; Video capture: 4K@60fps HDR)	LPDDR4X Quad-channel 16-bit (64-bit) 2133 MHz (34.13 GB/s)	Internal: X24 LTE (Cat 20: download up to 2 Gbit/s, 7x20 MHz CA, 256-QAM, 4x4 MIMO on 5C. Upload up to 316 Mbit/s, 3x20 MHz CA, 256-QAM) + External: X50 5G (5G NR Sub-6 & mmWave: download up to 5 Gbit/s)	Bluetooth 5.0; 802.11ax (Wi-Fi 6); GPS, Glonass, Beidou, Galileo, QZSS, SBAS; USB 3.1	4+	March 22, 2021	Q1 2021
SM8150P	Snapdragon; 855+	7 nm (TSMC; N7)	76.9 mm^{2}	1 + 3 + 4 cores Kryo 485 (2.96 GHz Cortex-A76 + 2.42 GHz Cortex-A76 + 1.80 GHz Cortex-A55)	Adreno 640 675 MHz (1036.8 GFLOPS in FP32)	Hexagon 690 (7 TOPs)	Spectra 380 (192 MP single camera / 48 MP at 30 fps single camera with MFNR/ZSL / 22 MP at 30 fps dual camera with MFNR/ZSL; Video capture: 4K@60fps HDR)	LPDDR4X Quad-channel 16-bit (64-bit) 2133 MHz (34.13 GB/s)	Internal: no + External: X55 5G (5G NR Sub-6 & mmWave: download up to 7.5 Gbit/s, upload up to 3 Gbit/s; LTE Cat 22: download @ 2.5 Gbit/s, upload @ 0.316 Gbit/s)	Bluetooth 5.0; 802.11ax (Wi-Fi 6); GPS, Glonass, Beidou, Galileo, QZSS, SBAS; USB 3.1	4+	July 15, 2019	Q3 2019
SM8250	Snapdragon; 865	7 nm (TSMC N7P)	86.8 mm^{2}	1 + 3 + 4 cores Kryo 585 (2.84 GHz Cortex-A77 + 2.42 GHz Cortex-A77 + 1.80 GHz Cortex-A55)	Adreno 650 587 MHz (901.6 GFLOPS in FP32)	Hexagon 698 (15 TOPs)	Spectra 480 (200 MP Photo Capture / 64 MP at 30 fps single camera with MFNR/ZSL / 25 MP at 30 fps dual camera with MFNR/ZSL; Video capture: 8K@30fps, 4K@120fps HDR)	LPDDR5 Quad-channel 16-bit (64-bit) 2750 MHz (44 GB/s) or LPDDR4X Quad-channel 16-bit (64-bit) 2133 MHz (34.13 GB/s)	Internal: none + External: X55 5G (5G NR Sub-6 & mmWave: download @ 7.5 Gbit/s, upload @ 3 Gbit/s; LTE Cat 22: download @ 2.5 Gbit/s, upload @ 0.316 Gbit/s)	FastConnect 6800: Bluetooth 5.1; 802.11ax (Wi-Fi 6) @ 1.774 Gbit/s; 802.11ad/ay 60 GHz @ 10 Gbit/s; GPS, Glonass, NavIC, Beidou, Galileo, QZSS, SBAS; USB 3.1	4+	December 4, 2019	Q1 2020
SM8250-AB	Snapdragon; 865+	7 nm (TSMC N7P)	86.8 mm^{2}	1 + 3 + 4 cores Kryo 585 (3.1 GHz Cortex-A77 + 2.42 GHz Cortex-A77 + 1.80 GHz Cortex-A55)	Adreno 650 670 MHz (1029.1 GFLOPS in FP32)	Hexagon 698 (15 TOPs)	Spectra 480 (200 MP Photo Capture / 64 MP at 30 fps single camera with MFNR/ZSL / 25 MP at 30 fps dual camera with MFNR/ZSL; Video capture: 8K@30fps, 4K@120fps HDR)	LPDDR5 Quad-channel 16-bit (64-bit) 2750 MHz (44 GB/s) or LPDDR4X Quad-channel 16-bit (64-bit) 2133 MHz (34.13 GB/s)	Internal: none + External: X55 5G (5G NR Sub-6 & mmWave: download @ 7.5 Gbit/s, upload @ 3 Gbit/s; LTE Cat 22: download @ 2.5 Gbit/s, upload @ 0.316 Gbit/s)	FastConnect 6900: Bluetooth 5.2; 802.11ax (Wi-Fi 6E) @ 3.6 Gbit/s; 802.11ad/ay 60 GHz @ 10 Gbit/s; GPS, Glonass, NavIC, Beidou, Galileo, QZSS, SBAS; USB 3.1	4+	July 8, 2020	Q3 2020
SM8250-AC	Snapdragon; 870	7 nm (TSMC N7P)	86.8 mm^{2}	1 + 3 + 4 cores Kryo 585 (3.2 GHz Cortex-A77 + 2.42 GHz Cortex-A77 + 1.80 GHz Cortex-A55)	Adreno 650 670 MHz (1029.1 GFLOPS in FP32)	Hexagon 698 (15 TOPs)	Spectra 480 (200 MP Photo Capture / 64 MP at 30 fps single camera with MFNR/ZSL / 25 MP at 30 fps dual camera with MFNR/ZSL; Video capture: 8K@30fps, 4K@120fps HDR)	LPDDR5 Quad-channel 16-bit (64-bit) 2750 MHz (44 GB/s) or LPDDR4X Quad-channel 16-bit (64-bit) 2133 MHz (34.13 GB/s)	Internal: none + External: X55 5G (5G NR Sub-6 & mmWave: download @ 7.5 Gbit/s, upload @ 3 Gbit/s; LTE Cat 22: download @ 2.5 Gbit/s, upload @ 0.316 Gbit/s)	FastConnect 6800; Bluetooth 5.2; 802.11ax (Wi-Fi 6) @ 1.774 Gbit/s; 802.11ad/ay 60 GHz @ 10 Gbit/s; GPS, Glonass, NavIC, Beidou, Galileo, QZSS, SBAS; USB 3.1	4+	January 19, 2021	Q1 2021
SM8350	Snapdragon; 888	5 nm (Samsung; 5LPE)	112.2 mm^{2}	1 + 3 + 4 cores Kryo 680 (2.84 GHz Cortex-X1 + 2.42 GHz Cortex-A78 + 1.80 GHz Cortex-A55)	Adreno 660 840 MHz (1290.2 GFLOPS in FP32)	Hexagon 780 (26 TOPs)	Spectra 580 (200 MP Photo Capture; 84 MP single camera @ 30 fps MFNR/ZSL, 64 MP dual camera @ 30fps ZSL, 28 MP triple camera @ 30fps ZSL; Video Capture: 8K@30fps, 4K@120fps HDR)	LPDDR5 Quad-channel 16-bit (64-bit) 3200 MHz (51.2 GiB/s)	Internal: X60 5G (5G NR Sub-6 & mmWave: download 7.5 Gbit/s, upload 3 Gbit/s; LTE Cat 22: download 2.5 Gbit/s, upload 0.316 Gbit/s)	FastConnect 6900: Bluetooth 5.2; 802.11ax (Wi-Fi 6E) @ 3.6 Gbit/s; GPS, Glonass, NavIC, Beidou, Galileo, QZSS; USB 3.1	5	December 1, 2020	Q1 2021
SM8350-AC	Snapdragon; 888+	5 nm (Samsung; 5LPE)	112.2 mm^{2}	1 + 3 + 4 cores Kryo 680 (3.0 GHz Cortex-X1 + 2.42 GHz Cortex-A78 + 1.80 GHz Cortex-A55)	Adreno 660 840 MHz (1290.2 GFLOPS in FP32)	Hexagon 780 (32 TOPs)	Spectra 580 (200 MP Photo Capture; 84 MP single camera @ 30 fps MFNR/ZSL, 64 MP dual camera @ 30fps ZSL, 28 MP triple camera @ 30fps ZSL; Video Capture: 8K@30fps, 4K@120fps HDR)	LPDDR5 Quad-channel 16-bit (64-bit) 3200 MHz (51.2 GiB/s)	Internal: X60 5G (5G NR Sub-6 & mmWave: download 7.5 Gbit/s, upload 3 Gbit/s; LTE Cat 22: download 2.5 Gbit/s, upload 0.316 Gbit/s)	FastConnect 6900: Bluetooth 5.2; 802.11ax (Wi-Fi 6E) @ 3.6 Gbit/s; GPS, Glonass, NavIC, Beidou, Galileo, QZSS; USB 3.1	5	June 28, 2021	Q3 2021

=== Snapdragon 8 (since 2021) ===
Model number	Product name	Fab	Die size	CPU (ARMv9) (Cores / Freq)	GPU	DSP	ISP	Memory technology	Modem	Connectivity	Quick Charge	Announcement date	Released
SM8450	Snapdragon; 8 Gen 1	4 nm (Samsung; 4LPX)	128.5 mm^{2}	Kryo (1× 3.0 GHz Cortex-X2 + 3× 2.5 GHz Cortex-A710 + 4× 1.8 GHz Cortex-A510)	Adreno 730; 818 MHz (1675.3 GFLOPs in FP32)	Hexagon	Spectra (200 MP Photo Capture, 108 MP single camera @30fps ZSL, 64+36 MP dual camera @30fps ZSL, 36 MP triple camera @30fps ZSL; Video Capture: 8K@30fps HDR)	LPDDR5 Quad-channel; 16-bit (64-bit) 3200 MHz (51.2 GiB/s)	Internal: X65 5G (5G NR Sub-6 & mmWave: download @ 10 Gbit/s, upload @ 3 Gbit/s; LTE Cat 22: download @ 2.5 Gbit/s, upload @ 0.316 Gbit/s)	FastConnect 6900: Bluetooth 5.3; 802.11ax (Wi-Fi 6E) @ 3.6 Gbit/s; GPS, GLONASS, NavIC, Beidou, Galileo, QZSS; USB 3.1	5	November 30, 2021	Q4 2021
SM8475	Snapdragon; 8+ Gen 1	4 nm (TSMC; N4)	102.6 mm^{2}	Kryo (1× 3.0 GHz Cortex-X2 + 3× 2.5 GHz Cortex-A710 + 4× 1.8 GHz Cortex-A510)	Adreno 730; 900 MHz (1843.2 GFLOPS in FP32)	Hexagon	Spectra (200 MP Photo Capture, 108 MP single camera @30fps ZSL, 64+36 MP dual camera @30fps ZSL, 36 MP triple camera @30fps ZSL; Video Capture: 8K@30fps HDR)	LPDDR5 Quad-channel; 16-bit (64-bit) 3200 MHz (51.2 GiB/s)	Internal: X65 5G (5G NR Sub-6 & mmWave: download @ 10 Gbit/s, upload @ 3 Gbit/s; LTE Cat 22: download @ 2.5 Gbit/s, upload @ 0.316 Gbit/s)	FastConnect 6900: Bluetooth 5.3; 802.11ax (Wi-Fi 6E) @ 3.6 Gbit/s; GPS, GLONASS, NavIC, Beidou, Galileo, QZSS; USB 3.1	5	May 20, 2022	Q4 2022
SM8475	Snapdragon; 8+ Gen 1	4 nm (TSMC; N4)	102.6 mm^{2}	Kryo (1× 3.2 GHz Cortex-X2 + 3× 2.75 GHz Cortex-A710 + 4× 2.0 GHz Cortex-A510)	Adreno 730; 900 MHz (1843.2 GFLOPS in FP32)	Hexagon	Spectra (200 MP Photo Capture, 108 MP single camera @30fps ZSL, 64+36 MP dual camera @30fps ZSL, 36 MP triple camera @30fps ZSL; Video Capture: 8K@30fps HDR)	LPDDR5 Quad-channel; 16-bit (64-bit) 3200 MHz (51.2 GiB/s)	Internal: X65 5G (5G NR Sub-6 & mmWave: download @ 10 Gbit/s, upload @ 3 Gbit/s; LTE Cat 22: download @ 2.5 Gbit/s, upload @ 0.316 Gbit/s)	FastConnect 6900: Bluetooth 5.3; 802.11ax (Wi-Fi 6E) @ 3.6 Gbit/s; GPS, GLONASS, NavIC, Beidou, Galileo, QZSS; USB 3.1	5	May 20, 2022	Q2 2022
SM8425	Snapdragon; 8+ Gen 1 4G	4 nm (TSMC; N4)	102.6 mm^{2}	Kryo (1× 3.2 GHz Cortex-X2 + 3× 2.75 GHz Cortex-A710 + 4× 2.0 GHz Cortex-A510)	Adreno 730; 900 MHz (1843.2 GFLOPS in FP32)	Hexagon	Spectra (200 MP Photo Capture, 108 MP single camera @30fps ZSL, 64+36 MP dual camera @30fps ZSL, 36 MP triple camera @30fps ZSL; Video Capture: 8K@30fps HDR)	LPDDR5 Quad-channel; 16-bit (64-bit) 3200 MHz (51.2 GiB/s)	Internal: (LTE Cat 22: download @ 2.5 Gbit/s, upload @ 0.316 Gbit/s)	FastConnect 6900: Bluetooth 5.3; 802.11ax (Wi-Fi 6E) @ 3.6 Gbit/s; GPS, GLONASS, NavIC, Beidou, Galileo, QZSS; USB 3.1	5	May 20, 2022	Q3 2022
SM8550-AB	Snapdragon; 8 Gen 2	4 nm (TSMC; N4)	118.4 mm^{2}	Kryo (1× 3.19 GHz Cortex-X3 + 4× 2.8 GHz {2×Cortex-A715, 2×Cortex-A710} + 3× 2.0 GHz Cortex-A510)	Adreno 740; 680 MHz (2089; GFLOPS in FP32)	Hexagon	Spectra (200 MP Photo Capture, 108 MP single camera @30fps ZSL, 64+36 MP dual camera @30fps ZSL, 36 MP triple camera @30fps ZSL; Video Capture: 8K@30fps HDR)	LPDDR5X Quad-channel 16-bit (64-bit) 4200 MHz (67.2 GB/s)	Internal: X70 5G (5G NR Sub-6 & mmWave: download 10 Gbit/s, upload 3.5 Gbit/s)	FastConnect 7800: Bluetooth 5.3; 802.11ac/ax/be (Wi-Fi 7) @ 5.8 Gbit/s; GPS, Glonass, NavIC, Beidou, Galileo, QZSS; USB 3.1 or FastConnect 6900: Bluetooth 5.3; 802.11ac/ax (Wi-Fi 6E) @ 3.6 Gbit/s; GPS, Glonass, NavIC, Beidou, Galileo, QZSS; USB 3.1	5	November 15, 2022	Q4 2022
SM8550-AC	Snapdragon; 8 Gen 2 for Galaxy (Note: This chipset was first released with the Galaxy S23 series. It made its way to non-Samsung devices with the release of ZTE Nubia's Red Magic 8S Pro on July 5, 2023 in which the chipset is referred to as "Leading Version".)	4 nm (TSMC; N4)	118.4 mm^{2}	Kryo (1× 3.36 GHz Cortex-X3 + 4× 2.8 GHz {2×Cortex-A715, 2×Cortex-A710} + 3× 2.0 GHz Cortex-A510)	Adreno 740; 719 MHz (2208.8; GFLOPS in FP32)	Hexagon	Spectra (200 MP Photo Capture, 108 MP single camera @30fps ZSL, 64+36 MP dual camera @30fps ZSL, 36 MP triple camera @30fps ZSL; Video Capture: 8K@30fps HDR)	LPDDR5X Quad-channel 16-bit (64-bit) 4200 MHz (67.2 GB/s)	Internal: X70 5G (5G NR Sub-6 & mmWave: download 10 Gbit/s, upload 3.5 Gbit/s)	FastConnect 7800: Bluetooth 5.3; 802.11ac/ax/be (Wi-Fi 7) @ 5.8 Gbit/s; GPS, Glonass, NavIC, Beidou, Galileo, QZSS; USB 3.1 or FastConnect 6900: Bluetooth 5.3; 802.11ac/ax (Wi-Fi 6E) @ 3.6 Gbit/s; GPS, Glonass, NavIC, Beidou, Galileo, QZSS; USB 3.1	5	November 15, 2022	Q1 2023
SM8650-AB	Snapdragon; 8 Gen 3	4 nm (TSMC; N4P)	137.3 mm^{2}	Kryo (1× 3.3 GHz Cortex-X4 + 3× 3.15 GHz Cortex-A720 + 2× 2.96 GHz Cortex-A720 + 2× 2.27 GHz Cortex-A520)	Adreno 750; 903 MHz (2774; GFLOPS in FP32)	Hexagon	Spectra (200 MP Photo Capture, 108 MP single camera @30fps ZSL, 64+36 MP dual camera @30fps ZSL, 36 MP triple camera @30fps ZSL; Video Capture: 8K@30fps HDR)	LPDDR5X quad-channel 16-bit (64-bit) 4800 MHz (76.8 GB/s)	Internal: X75 5G (5G NR Sub-6 & mmWave: download @ 10 Gbit/s, upload @ 3.5 Gbit/s)	FastConnect 7800: Bluetooth 5.4; 802.11ac/ax/be (Wi-Fi 7) @ 5.8 Gbit/s; GPS, Glonass, NavIC, Beidou, Galileo, QZSS; USB 3.1	5	October 24, 2023	Q4 2023
SM8650-AA	Snapdragon; 8 Gen 3	4 nm (TSMC; N4P)	137.3 mm^{2}	Kryo (1× 3.05 GHz Cortex-X4 + 5× 2.96 GHz Cortex-A720 + 2× 2.04 GHz Cortex-A520)	Adreno 750; 903 MHz (2774; GFLOPS in FP32)	Hexagon	Spectra (200 MP Photo Capture, 108 MP single camera @30fps ZSL, 64+36 MP dual camera @30fps ZSL, 36 MP triple camera @30fps ZSL; Video Capture: 8K@30fps HDR)	LPDDR5X quad-channel 16-bit (64-bit) 4800 MHz (76.8 GB/s)	Internal: X75 5G (5G NR Sub-6 & mmWave: download @ 10 Gbit/s, upload @ 3.5 Gbit/s)	FastConnect 7800: Bluetooth 5.4; 802.11ac/ax/be (Wi-Fi 7) @ 5.8 Gbit/s; GPS, Glonass, NavIC, Beidou, Galileo, QZSS; USB 3.1	5	October 24, 2023	Q4 2024
SM8650-Q-AB	Snapdragon; 8 Gen 3	4 nm (TSMC; N4P)	137.3 mm^{2}	Kryo (1× 3.30 GHz Cortex-X4 + 4× 2.96 GHz Cortex-A720 + 1× 2.27 GHz Cortex-A520)	Adreno 750; 903 MHz (2774; GFLOPS in FP32)	Hexagon	Spectra (200 MP Photo Capture, 108 MP single camera @30fps ZSL, 64+36 MP dual camera @30fps ZSL, 36 MP triple camera @30fps ZSL; Video Capture: 8K@30fps HDR)	LPDDR5X quad-channel 16-bit (64-bit) 4800 MHz (76.8 GB/s)	—N/a	FastConnect 7800: Bluetooth 5.4; 802.11ac/ax/be (Wi-Fi 7) @ 5.8 Gbit/s; GPS, Glonass, NavIC, Beidou, Galileo, QZSS; USB 3.1	5	October 24, 2023	Q3 2025
SM8650-Q-AA	Snapdragon; 8 Gen 3	4 nm (TSMC; N4P)	137.3 mm^{2}	Kryo (1× 3.05 GHz Cortex-X4 + 4× 2.96 GHz Cortex-A720 + 1× 2.04 GHz Cortex-A520)	Adreno 750; 903 MHz (2774; GFLOPS in FP32)	Hexagon	Spectra (200 MP Photo Capture, 108 MP single camera @30fps ZSL, 64+36 MP dual camera @30fps ZSL, 36 MP triple camera @30fps ZSL; Video Capture: 8K@30fps HDR)	LPDDR5X quad-channel 16-bit (64-bit) 4800 MHz (76.8 GB/s)	—N/a	FastConnect 7800: Bluetooth 5.4; 802.11ac/ax/be (Wi-Fi 7) @ 5.8 Gbit/s; GPS, Glonass, NavIC, Beidou, Galileo, QZSS; USB 3.1	5	October 24, 2023	Q3 2025
SM8650-AC	Snapdragon; 8 Gen 3 for Galaxy (Note: Also known as "Leading Version".)	4 nm (TSMC; N4P)	137.3 mm^{2}	Kryo (1× 3.4 GHz Cortex-X4 + 3× 3.15 GHz Cortex-A720 + 2× 2.96 GHz Cortex-A720 + 2× 2.27 GHz Cortex-A520)	Adreno 750; 1000 MHz (3072; GFLOPS in FP32)	Hexagon	Spectra (200 MP Photo Capture, 108 MP single camera @30fps ZSL, 64+36 MP dual camera @30fps ZSL, 36 MP triple camera @30fps ZSL; Video Capture: 8K@30fps HDR)	LPDDR5X quad-channel 16-bit (64-bit) 4800 MHz (76.8 GB/s)	Internal: X75 5G (5G NR Sub-6 & mmWave: download @ 10 Gbit/s, upload @ 3.5 Gbit/s)	FastConnect 7800: Bluetooth 5.4; 802.11ac/ax/be (Wi-Fi 7) @ 5.8 Gbit/s; GPS, Glonass, NavIC, Beidou, Galileo, QZSS; USB 3.1	5	October 24, 2023	Q1 2024
SM8635	Snapdragon; 8s Gen 3	4 nm (TSMC; N4P)	89.54 mm^{2}	Kryo (1× 3.0 GHz Cortex-X4 + 4× 2.8 GHz Cortex-A720 + 3× 2.0 GHz Cortex-A520)	Adreno 735; 1100 MHz (1689.6; GFLOPS in FP32)	Hexagon	Spectra (200 MP Photo Capture, 108 MP single camera @30fps ZSL, 64+36 MP dual camera @30fps ZSL, 36 MP triple camera @30fps ZSL; Video Capture: 4K@60fps HDR)	LPDDR5X quad-channel 16-bit (64-bit); 4200 MHz (67.2 GB/s)	Internal: X70 5G (5G NR Sub-6 & mmWave: download @ 6.5 Gbit/s, upload @ 3.5 Gbit/s)	FastConnect 7800: Bluetooth 5.4; 802.11ac/ax/be (Wi-Fi 7) @ 5.8 Gbit/s; GPS, Glonass, NavIC, Beidou, Galileo, QZSS; USB 3.1	5	March 18, 2024	Q1 2024
SM8750-AB	Snapdragon; 8 Elite	3 nm (TSMC; N3E)	124.1 mm^{2}	Oryon (2× 4.32 GHz Prime cores + 6× 3.53 GHz Performance cores)	Adreno 830; 1100 MHz (3379.2; GFLOPS in FP32)	Hexagon	Spectra (320 MP Photo Capture, 108 MP single camera @30fps ZSL, 48 MP triple camera @30fps ZSL; Video Capture: 8K@60fps HDR)	LPDDR5X quad-channel 16-bit (64-bit); 5300 MHz (84.8 GB/s)	Internal: X80 5G (5G NR Sub-6 & mmWave: download 10 Gbit/s, upload 3.5 Gbit/s)	FastConnect 7900: Bluetooth 6.0, 802.11ax/be (Wi-Fi 7) @ 5.8 Gbit/s, GPS, QZSS, Glonass, NavIC, Beidou, Galileo, USB 3.1	5	October 22, 2024	Q4 2024
SM8750-3-AB	Snapdragon; 8 Elite	3 nm (TSMC; N3E)	124.1 mm^{2}	Oryon (2× 4.32 GHz Prime cores + 5× 3.53 GHz; Performance cores)	Adreno 830; 1100 MHz (3379.2; GFLOPS in FP32)	Hexagon	Spectra (320 MP Photo Capture, 108 MP single camera @30fps ZSL, 48 MP triple camera @30fps ZSL; Video Capture: 8K@60fps HDR)	LPDDR5X quad-channel 16-bit (64-bit); 5300 MHz (84.8 GB/s)	Internal: X80 5G (5G NR Sub-6 & mmWave: download 10 Gbit/s, upload 3.5 Gbit/s)	FastConnect 7900: Bluetooth 6.0, 802.11ax/be (Wi-Fi 7) @ 5.8 Gbit/s, GPS, QZSS, Glonass, NavIC, Beidou, Galileo, USB 3.1	5	October 22, 2024	Q1 2025
SM8750-AC	Snapdragon; 8 Elite for Galaxy	3 nm (TSMC; N3E)	124.1 mm^{2}	Oryon (2× 4.47 GHz Prime cores + 6× 3.53 GHz Performance cores)	Adreno 830; 1200 MHz (3686.4; GFLOPS in FP32)	Hexagon	Spectra (320 MP Photo Capture, 108 MP single camera @30fps ZSL, 48 MP triple camera @30fps ZSL; Video Capture: 8K@60fps HDR)	LPDDR5X quad-channel 16-bit (64-bit); 5300 MHz (84.8 GB/s)	Internal: X80 5G (5G NR Sub-6 & mmWave: download 10 Gbit/s, upload 3.5 Gbit/s)	FastConnect 7900: Bluetooth 6.0, 802.11ax/be (Wi-Fi 7) @ 5.8 Gbit/s, GPS, QZSS, Glonass, NavIC, Beidou, Galileo, USB 3.1	5	October 22, 2024	Q1 2025
SM8735	Snapdragon; 8s Gen 4	4 nm (TSMC; N4P)	105.5 mm^{2}	Kryo (1× 3.21 GHz Cortex-X4 + 3× 3.0 GHz Cortex-A720 + 2× 2.8 GHz Cortex-A720 + 2× 2.02 GHz Cortex-A720)	Adreno 825; 1150 MHz (2355.2; GFLOPS in FP32)	Hexagon	Spectra (320 MP Photo Capture, 108 MP single camera @30fps ZSL, 36 MP triple camera @30fps ZSL; Video Capture: 4K@60fps HDR)	LPDDR5X quad-channel 16-bit (64-bit) 4800 MHz (76.8 GB/s)	Internal (5G NR Sub-6: download up to 4.2 Gbit/s)	FastConnect 7900: Bluetooth 6.0, 802.11ax/be (Wi-Fi 7) @ 5.8 Gbit/s, GPS, QZSS, Glonass, NavIC, Beidou, Galileo, USB 3.1	5	April 2, 2025	Q2 2025
SM8850-AC	Snapdragon; 8 Elite Gen 5	3 nm (TSMC; N3P)	126.2 mm^{2}	Oryon (2× 4.61 GHz Prime cores + 6× 3.63 GHz Performance cores)	Adreno 840; 1200 MHz (3686.4; GFLOPS in FP32)	Hexagon	Spectra (320 MP Photo Capture, 108 MP single camera @30fps ZSL, 48 MP triple camera @30fps ZSL; Video Capture: 4K@120fps HDR)	LPDDR5X quad-channel 16-bit (64-bit); 5300 MHz (84.8 GB/s)	Internal: X85 5G (5G NR Sub-6 & mmWave: download 12.5 Gbit/s, upload 3.7 Gbit/s)	FastConnect 7900: Bluetooth 6.0, 802.11ax/be (Wi-Fi 7) @ 5.8 Gbit/s, GPS, QZSS, Glonass, NavIC, Beidou, Galileo, USB 3.1	5	September 24, 2025	Q3 2025
SM8850-5-AC	Snapdragon; 8 Elite Gen 5	3 nm (TSMC; N3P)	126.2 mm^{2}	Oryon (2× 4.61 GHz Prime cores + 5× 3.63 GHz Performance cores)	Adreno 840; 1200 MHz (3686.4; GFLOPS in FP32)	Hexagon	Spectra (320 MP Photo Capture, 108 MP single camera @30fps ZSL, 48 MP triple camera @30fps ZSL; Video Capture: 4K@120fps HDR)	LPDDR5X quad-channel 16-bit (64-bit); 5300 MHz (84.8 GB/s)	Internal: X85 5G (5G NR Sub-6 & mmWave: download 12.5 Gbit/s, upload 3.7 Gbit/s)	FastConnect 7900: Bluetooth 6.0, 802.11ax/be (Wi-Fi 7) @ 5.8 Gbit/s, GPS, QZSS, Glonass, NavIC, Beidou, Galileo, USB 3.1	5	September 24, 2025	Q1 2026
SM8850-1-AD	Snapdragon; 8 Elite Gen 5 for Galaxy	3 nm (TSMC; N3P)	126.2 mm^{2}	Oryon (2× 4.74 GHz Prime cores + 6× 3.63 GHz Performance cores)	Adreno 840; 1300 MHz (3993.6; GFLOPS in FP32)	Hexagon	Spectra (320 MP Photo Capture, 108 MP single camera @30fps ZSL, 48 MP triple camera @30fps ZSL; Video Capture: 4K@120fps HDR)	LPDDR5X quad-channel 16-bit (64-bit); 5300 MHz (84.8 GB/s)	Internal: X85 5G (5G NR Sub-6 & mmWave: download 12.5 Gbit/s, upload 3.7 Gbit/s)	FastConnect 7900: Bluetooth 6.0, 802.11ax/be (Wi-Fi 7) @ 5.8 Gbit/s, GPS, QZSS, Glonass, NavIC, Beidou, Galileo, USB 3.1	5	September 24, 2025	Q1 2026
SM8850-1-AB	Snapdragon; 8 Elite Gen 5 V Series	3 nm (TSMC; N3P)	126.2 mm^{2}	Oryon (2× 4.61 GHz Prime cores + 6× 3.63 GHz Performance cores)	Adreno 840 (8 CUs); 1200 MHz (2457.6; GFLOPS in FP32)	Hexagon	Spectra (320 MP Photo Capture, 108 MP single camera @30fps ZSL, 48 MP triple camera @30fps ZSL; Video Capture: 4K@120fps HDR)	LPDDR5X quad-channel 16-bit (64-bit); 5300 MHz (84.8 GB/s)	Internal: X85 5G (5G NR Sub-6 & mmWave: download 12.5 Gbit/s, upload 3.7 Gbit/s)	FastConnect 7900: Bluetooth 6.0, 802.11ax/be (Wi-Fi 7) @ 5.8 Gbit/s, GPS, QZSS, Glonass, NavIC, Beidou, Galileo, USB 3.1	5	September 24, 2025	Q3 2026
SM8845	Snapdragon; 8 Gen 5	3 nm (TSMC; N3P)	103.5 mm^{2}	Oryon (2× 3.8 GHz Prime cores + 6× 3.32 GHz Performance cores)	Adreno 829; 1225 MHz (2508.8; GFLOPS in FP32)	Hexagon	Spectra (320 MP Photo Capture, 108 MP single camera @30fps ZSL, 48 MP triple camera @30fps ZSL; Video Capture: 4K@120fps HDR)	LPDDR5X quad-channel 16-bit (64-bit) 4800 MHz (76.8 GB/s)	Internal: X80 5G (5G NR Sub-6 & mmWave: download 10 Gbit/s, upload 3.5 Gbit/s)	FastConnect 7900: Bluetooth 6.0, 802.11ax/be (Wi-Fi 7) @ 5.8 Gbit/s, GPS, QZSS, Glonass, NavIC, Beidou, Galileo, USB 3.1	5	November 26, 2025	Q4 2025
SM8950	Snapdragon; 8 Elite Gen 6	2 nm (TSMC; N2P)	125.0 mm^{2}	Oryon (2× 5.01 GHz Prime cores + 3× 4.03 GHz Performance cores + 3× 3.74 GHz Performance cores)	Adreno 845; 1250 MHz (3840 GFLOPS in FP32)	Hexagon	Spectra (320 MP Photo Capture, 108 MP single camera @30fps ZSL, 64 MP triple camera @30fps ZSL; Video Capture: 8K@60fps HDR)	LPDDR5X quad-channel 16-bit (64-bit); 5300 MHz (84.8 GB/s) or LPDDR6 quad-channel 24-bit (96-bit); 5300 MHz (113.8 GB/s)	Internal: X105 5G (5G NR Sub-6 & mmWave: download 14.8 Gbit/s, upload 4.2 Gbit/s)	FastConnect 8800: Bluetooth 6.3, 802.11ax/be/bn (Wi-Fi 8) @ 11.65 Gbit/s, GPS, QZSS, Glonass, NavIC, Beidou, Galileo, USB 3.1 Gen 2	5	September 22, 2026	Q3 2026
SM8975	Snapdragon; 8 Elite Extreme Gen 6	2 nm (TSMC; N2P)	133.2 mm^{2}	Oryon (2× 5.01 GHz Prime cores + 3× 4.03 GHz Performance cores + 3× 3.74 GHz Performance cores)	Adreno 850; 1450 MHz (4454.4; GFLOPS in FP32)	Hexagon	Spectra (320 MP Photo Capture, 108 MP single camera @30fps ZSL, 64 MP triple camera @30fps ZSL; Video Capture: 8K@60fps HDR)	LPDDR5X quad-channel 16-bit (64-bit); 5300 MHz (84.8 GB/s) or LPDDR6 quad-channel 24-bit (96-bit); 5300 MHz (113.8 GB/s)	Internal: X105 5G (5G NR Sub-6 & mmWave: download 14.8 Gbit/s, upload 4.2 Gbit/s)	FastConnect 8800: Bluetooth 6.3, 802.11ax/be/bn (Wi-Fi 8) @ 11.65 Gbit/s, GPS, QZSS, Glonass, NavIC, Beidou, Galileo, USB 3.1 Gen 2	5	September 22, 2026	Q3 2026

== Mobile Compute Platforms ==
=== Snapdragon 835 and Snapdragon 850 ===
Model number	Product name	Fab	CPU (ARMv8)	GPU	DSP	ISP	Memory technology	Modem	Connectivity	Quick Charge	Announcement date	Sampling availability
MSM8998	Snapdragon; 835	10 nm (Samsung; 10LPE)	Cortex-A73 4× 2.5GHz Cortex-A53 4× 1.9GHz	Adreno 540 710 MHz (363.5 GFLOPS in FP32)	Hexagon 682	Spectra 180 (Up to 32 MP camera / 16 MP dual)	LPDDR4X Dual-channel 32-bit (64-bit) 1866 MHz (29.9 GB/s)	X16 LTE (download: Cat 16, up to 1000 Mbit/s; 4x20 MHz CA; 256-QAM; 4x4 MIMO on 2C. upload: Cat 13, up to 150 Mbit/s)	Bluetooth 5; 802.11ac/ad Wave 2 (MU-MIMO); GPS, GLONASS, Beidou, Galileo, QZSS, SBAS	4	December 5, 2017	Q2 2018
SDM850	Snapdragon; 850	10 nm (Samsung; 10LPP)	Cortex-A75 4× 2.96GHz Cortex-A55 4× 1.77GHz	Adreno 630 710 MHz (727 GFLOPS in FP32)	Hexagon 685 (3 TOPS)	Spectra 280 (192 MP single camera / 16 MP at 30fps Dual Camera with MFNR/ZSL)	LPDDR4X Quad-channel 16-bit (64-bit) 1866 MHz (29.9 GB/s)	X20 LTE (download: Cat 18, up to 1200 Mbit/s; 5x20 MHz CA; 256-QAM; 4x4 MIMO on 3C. upload: Cat 13, up to 150 Mbit/s; 2x20 MHz CA; 64-QAM)	Bluetooth 5; 802.11ac/ad Wave 2 (MU-MIMO); GPS, GLONASS, Beidou, Galileo, QZSS, SBAS	4+	June 4, 2018	Q3 2018

=== Snapdragon 7c/7c+ Compute Platforms ===
Model number	Product name	Fab	CPU (ARMv8)	GPU	DSP	ISP	Memory technology	Modem	Connectivity	Quick Charge	Announcement date	Sampling availability
SC7180	Snapdragon 7c	8 nm (Samsung; 8LPP)	Kryo 468; 2 + 6 cores (2.4 GHz)	Adreno 618 825 MHz (422.4 GFLOPS in FP32)	Hexagon 692 (5 TOPS)	Spectra 255 (32 MP camera, 16 MP dual)	LPDDR4X; Dual-channel 16-bit (32-bit); 2133 MHz (17.1 GB/s)	X15 LTE download: Cat 15, @ 800 Mbit/s; upload: Cat 13, @ 150 Mbit/s	Bluetooth 5; 802.11ax (Wi-Fi 6); GPS, Glonass, SBAS, Beidou, Galileo, QZSS, NavIC; USB 3.1; eMMC 5.1, UFS 3.0		December 5, 2019	Q1 2020
SC7180P	Snapdragon; 7c Gen 2	8 nm (Samsung; 8LPP)	Kryo 468; 2 + 6 cores (2.55 GHz)	Adreno 618 825 MHz (422.4 GFLOPS in FP32)	Hexagon 692 (5 TOPS)	Spectra 255 (32 MP camera, 16 MP dual)	LPDDR4X; Dual-channel 16-bit (32-bit); 2133 MHz (17.1 GB/s)	X15 LTE download: Cat 15, @ 800 Mbit/s; upload: Cat 13, @ 150 Mbit/s	Bluetooth 5; 802.11ax (Wi-Fi 6); GPS, Glonass, SBAS, Beidou, Galileo, QZSS, NavIC; USB 3.1; eMMC 5.1, UFS 3.0		May 24, 2021	Q2 2021
SC7280	Snapdragon; 7c+ Gen 3	6 nm (TSMC; N6)	Kryo 4 Gold + 4 Silver cores (Cortex-A78 2.4 GHz + Cortex-A55 1.8 GHz)	Adreno 642L 700 MHz (716.8 GFLOPS in FP32)	Hexagon (6.5 TOPS)	Spectra (64 MP single camera or 36+22 MP dual camera)	LPDDR4X; Dual-channel 16-bit (32-bit); 2133 MHz (17.1 GB/s) or LPDDR5; Dual-channel 16-bit (32-bit); 3200 MHz (25.6 GB/s)	Internal:X53 5G/LTE (5G: download @ 3.7 Gbit/s, upload @ 2.9 Gbit/s; LTE Cat 24/22: download @ 1200 Mbit/s, upload @ 210 Mbit/s)	FastConnect 6700, Bluetooth 5.2; 802.11ax (Wi-Fi 6E); 2x2 (MU-MIMO) @ 3.6 Gbit/s; GPS, Glonass, BeiDou, Galileo, QZSS, SBAS, USB 3.1; eMMC 5.1, UFS 2.1, NVMe SSD		December 1, 2021	Q1 2022

=== Snapdragon 8c Compute Platforms ===
Model number	Product name	Fab	CPU (ARMv8)	GPU	DSP	ISP	Memory technology	Modem	Connectivity	Quick Charge	Announcement date	Sampling availability
SC8180	Snapdragon 8c	7 nm (TSMC; N7)	Kryo 490 4 + 4 cores (2.45 GHz + 1.80 GHz)	Adreno 675; 590 MHz	Hexagon 690 (9 TOPS)	Spectra 390 (192MP single camera or 22MP at 30fps dual camera with MFNR / ZSL)	LPDDR4X; Quad-channel; 16-bit (64-bit); 2133 MHz (34.1 GB/s)	Internal: X24 LTE (Cat 20: download @ 2 Gbit/s, 7x20 MHz CA, 256-QAM, 4x4 MIMO on 5C. upload @ 316 Mbit/s, 3x20 MHz CA, 256-QAM) External: X55 5G/LTE (5G: download @ 7 Gbit/s, upload @ 3 Gbit/s; LTE Cat 22: download @ 2.5 Gbit/s, upload @ 316 Mbit/s)	Bluetooth 5.0; 802.11ac/ad; GPS, Glonass, SBAS, Beidou, Galileo, QZSS; USB 3.1; UFS 3.0, NVMe SSD	4+	December 5, 2019	Q1 2020

=== Snapdragon 8cx Compute Platforms ===
Model number	Product name	Fab	CPU (ARMv8)	GPU	DSP	ISP	Memory technology	Modem	Connectivity	Quick Charge	Announcement date	Sampling availability
SC8180X	Snapdragon; 8cx	7 nm (TSMC; N7)	Kryo 495; 4 + 4 cores (2.84 GHz Cortex-A76 + 1.80 GHz Cortex-A55)	Adreno 680; 585 MHz (1797.1; GFLOPS in FP32)	Hexagon; 690 (9 TOPS)	Spectra 390 (32MP single camera, 16MP at 30fps dual camera with MFNR / ZSL)	LPDDR4X; Octa-channel; 16-bit (128-bit); 2133 MHz (68.3 GB/s)	No internal modem Optional external X24 LTE (Cat 20: download @ 2 Gbit/s, 7x20 MHz CA, 256-QAM, 4x4 MIMO on 5C. Upload @ 316 Mbit/s, 3x20 MHz CA, 256-QAM)	Bluetooth 5.0; 802.11ac/ad; GPS, Glonass, SBAS, Beidou, Galileo, QZSS; USB 3.1; UFS 3.0, NVMe SSD	4+	December 6, 2018	Q3 2019
SC8180XP	Snapdragon; 8cx Gen 2 5G	7 nm (TSMC; N7)	Kryo 495; 4 + 4 cores (3.15 GHz Cortex-A76 + 1.8 GHz Cortex-A55)	Adreno 690; 660 MHz (2027.5; GFLOPS in FP32)	Hexagon; 690 (9 TOPS)	Spectra 390 (32MP single camera, 16MP at 30fps dual camera with MFNR / ZSL)	LPDDR4X; Octa-channel; 16-bit (128-bit); 2133 MHz (68.3 GB/s)	No internal modem Optional external X24 LTE (Cat 20: download @ 2 Gbit/s, 7x20 MHz CA, 256-QAM, 4x4 MIMO on 5C. Upload @ 316 Mbit/s, 3x20 MHz CA, 256-QAM) or X55 5G/LTE (5G: download @ 7 Gbit/s, upload @ 3 Gbit/s; LTE Cat 22: download @ 2.5 Gbit/s, upload @ 316 Mbit/s)	Bluetooth 5.1; 802.11ax (Wi-Fi 6); 2x2 (MU-MIMO) @ 2.4 Gbit/s, NFC, GPS, Glonass, Beidou, Galileo, QZSS, SBAS, USB 3.1; UFS 3.0. NVMe SSD	4+	September 3, 2020	Q3 2020
SC8280	Snapdragon; 8cx Gen 3	5 nm (Samsung; 5LPE)	Kryo; 4 + 4 cores (3.0 GHz Cortex-X1 + 2.40 GHz Cortex-A78)	Adreno 695; 900 MHz (3686.4; GFLOPS in FP32)	Hexagon (15 TOPS)	Spectra (24 MP at 30fps single camera with MFNR/ZSL)	LPDDR4X; Octa-channel; 16-bit (128-bit); 2133 MHz (68.3 GB/s)	No internal modem Optional external X55 5G/LTE, X62 5G/LTE, X65 5G/LTE (5G: download @ 4.4/7.5/10 Gbit/s, upload @ 3 Gbit/s; LTE Cat 22: download @ 2.5 Gbit/s, upload @ 316 Mbit/s)	FastConnect 6900, Bluetooth 5.1; 802.11ax (Wi-Fi 6E); 2x2 (MU-MIMO) @ 3.6 Gbit/s; GPS, Glonass, BeiDou, Galileo, QZSS, SBAS, USB 3.1; UFS 3.1, NVMe SSD		December 1, 2021	Q1 2022

=== Microsoft SQ compute platforms ===
Product name	Fab	CPU (ARMv8)	GPU	DSP	ISP	Memory technology	Modem	Connectivity	Quick Charge	Announcement date	Sampling availability
Microsoft SQ1	7 nm (TSMC; N7)	Kryo 495 4 + 4 cores (3 GHz Cortex-A76 + 1.80 GHz Cortex-A55)	Adreno 685 590 MHz (1812.5 GFLOPs in FP32)	Hexagon; 690 (9 TOPS)	Spectra 390 (192 MP single camera / 22 MP at 30fps dual camera with MFNR/ZSL)	LPDDR4X Octa-channel 16-bit (128-bit) 2133 MHz (68.2 GB/s)	No internal modem Optional external X24 LTE (Cat 20: download up to 2 Gbit/s, 7x20 MHz CA, 256-QAM, 4x4 MIMO on 5C. Upload up to 316 Mbit/s, 3x20 MHz CA, 256-QAM)	Bluetooth 5.0; 802.11ac/ad; GPS, GLONASS, Beidou, Galileo, QZSS, SBAS; USB 3.1; UFS 3.0, NVMe SSD	4+	October 2, 2019	Q4 2019
Microsoft SQ2	7 nm (TSMC; N7)	Kryo 495 4 + 4 cores (3.15 GHz Cortex-A76 + 2.42 GHz Cortex-A55)	Adreno; 690; 680 MHz (2089 GFLOPs in FP32)	Hexagon; 690 (9 TOPS)	Spectra 390 (192 MP single camera / 22 MP at 30fps dual camera with MFNR/ZSL)	LPDDR4X Octa-channel 16-bit (128-bit) 2133 MHz (68.2 GB/s)	No internal modem Optional external X24 LTE (Cat 20: download up to 2 Gbit/s, 7x20 MHz CA, 256-QAM, 4x4 MIMO on 5C. Upload up to 316 Mbit/s, 3x20 MHz CA, 256-QAM)	Bluetooth 5.0; 802.11ac/ad; GPS, GLONASS, Beidou, Galileo, QZSS, SBAS; USB 3.1; UFS 3.0, NVMe SSD	4+	October 1, 2020	Q4 2020
Microsoft SQ3	5 nm (Samsung 5LPE)	Kryo 4 + 4 cores (3.0 GHz Cortex-X1 + 2.40 GHz Cortex-A78)	Adreno; 695; 900 MHz (3686.4 GFLOPS in FP32)	Hexagon (15 TOPS)	Spectra (24 MP at 30fps single camera with MFNR/ZSL)	LPDDR4X Octa-channel 16-bit (128-bit) 2133 MHz (68.2 GB/s)	No internal modem Optional external X62 5G/LTE, X55 5G/LTE, X65 5G/LTE (5G: download up to 4.4/7.5/10 Gbit/s, upload up to 3 Gbit/s; LTE Cat 22: download up to 2.5 Gbit/s, upload up to 316 Mbit/s)	FastConnect 6900, Bluetooth 5.1; 802.11ac/ax (Wi-Fi 6E) 2x2 (MU-MIMO) @ 3.6 Gbit/s; GPS, GLONASS, BeiDou, Galileo, QZSS, SBAS, USB 3.1; UFS 3.1, NVMe SSD			Q3 2022

== Snapdragon X series ==
The Snapdragon X series is a family of Qualcomm systems on chips (SoCs) designed primarily for Windows PCs and related form factors, using Arm-based CPU designs and integrating GPU and on-device AI acceleration in a single platform. The series was introduced with the Snapdragon X Elite in October 2023 and expanded with additional tiers including Snapdragon X Plus in April 2024 and Snapdragon X in January 2025, with the lineup positioned to span premium through more mainstream PC designs.

All Snapdragon X SoCs are started from the UEFI/BIOS firmware, which can be provided by AMI, Insyde or Phoenix, and the Qualcomm UEFI firmware includes the XBL firmware library.

=== Snapdragon X1 series ===
The Snapdragon X1 series comprises the first generation of Snapdragon X laptop-focused SoCs, including Snapdragon X Elite (model prefix X1E), Snapdragon X Plus (X1P), and Snapdragon X (X1), which share common platform elements such as Qualcomm's Oryon CPU branding, Adreno integrated graphics, and a Hexagon NPU specified by Qualcomm at up to 45 TOPS for on-device AI workloads across multiple X1 configurations.

Product name	Model number	Fab	Die size	CPU (Cores/Freq)	GPU	DSP/NPU	ISP	Memory technology	Modem (external/optional)	Connectivity (external)	Announcement date	Sampling availability
Snapdragon X	X1-26-100	4 nm (TSMC N4)		Oryon 8 core (3.0 GHz)	Adreno; X1-45; 1250 MHz (1.7 TFLOPS)	Hexagon (45 TOPS)	Spectra (36 MP single camera)	LPDDR5X-8448 Octa-channel 16-bit (128-bit) @ 4224 MHz (135 GB/s)	X65 5G/LTE (5G: download up to 10 Gbit/s, upload up to 3.5 Gbit/s; LTE Cat 22: download up to 2.5 Gbit/s, upload up to 316 Mbit/s)	FastConnect 7800, Bluetooth 5.4; 802.11ac/ax/be (Wi-Fi 7) 2x2 (MU-MIMO) @ 3.6 Gbit/s; GPS, GLONASS, BeiDou, Galileo, QZSS, SBAS, USB4; UFS 4.0, NVMe SSD	January 6, 2025	Q1 2025
Snapdragon X	X1-26-101	4 nm (TSMC N4)		Oryon 8 core (3.0 GHz)	Adreno; X1-85; 625 MHz (1.7 TFLOPS)	Hexagon (45 TOPS)	Spectra (36 MP single camera)	LPDDR5X-8448 Octa-channel 16-bit (128-bit) @ 4224 MHz (135 GB/s)	X65 5G/LTE (5G: download up to 10 Gbit/s, upload up to 3.5 Gbit/s; LTE Cat 22: download up to 2.5 Gbit/s, upload up to 316 Mbit/s)	FastConnect 7800, Bluetooth 5.4; 802.11ac/ax/be (Wi-Fi 7) 2x2 (MU-MIMO) @ 3.6 Gbit/s; GPS, GLONASS, BeiDou, Galileo, QZSS, SBAS, USB4; UFS 4.0, NVMe SSD		2026
Snapdragon X Plus	X1P-42-100	4 nm (TSMC N4)		Oryon 8 core (3.2 GHz, single-core boost up to 3.4 GHz)	Adreno; X1-45; 1250 MHz (1.7 TFLOPS)	Hexagon (45 TOPS)	Spectra (36 MP single camera)	LPDDR5X-8448 Octa-channel 16-bit (128-bit) @ 4224 MHz (135 GB/s)	X65 5G/LTE (5G: download up to 10 Gbit/s, upload up to 3.5 Gbit/s; LTE Cat 22: download up to 2.5 Gbit/s, upload up to 316 Mbit/s)	FastConnect 7800, Bluetooth 5.4; 802.11ac/ax/be (Wi-Fi 7) 2x2 (MU-MIMO) @ 3.6 Gbit/s; GPS, GLONASS, BeiDou, Galileo, QZSS, SBAS, USB4; UFS 4.0, NVMe SSD	April 24, 2024	Q2 2024
Snapdragon X Plus	X1P-46-100	4 nm (TSMC N4)		Oryon 8 core (3.4 GHz, single-core boost up to 4.0 GHz)	Adreno; X1-45; 1400 MHz (2.1 TFLOPS)	Hexagon (45 TOPS)	Spectra (36 MP single camera)	LPDDR5X-8448 Octa-channel 16-bit (128-bit) @ 4224 MHz (135 GB/s)	X65 5G/LTE (5G: download up to 10 Gbit/s, upload up to 3.5 Gbit/s; LTE Cat 22: download up to 2.5 Gbit/s, upload up to 316 Mbit/s)	FastConnect 7800, Bluetooth 5.4; 802.11ac/ax/be (Wi-Fi 7) 2x2 (MU-MIMO) @ 3.6 Gbit/s; GPS, GLONASS, BeiDou, Galileo, QZSS, SBAS, USB4; UFS 4.0, NVMe SSD	April 24, 2024	Q2 2024
Snapdragon X Plus	X1P-64-100	4 nm (TSMC N4)	172.7 mm^{2}	Oryon 10 core (3.4 GHz)	Adreno; X1-85; 1250 MHz (3.8 TFLOPS)	Hexagon (45 TOPS)	Spectra (64 MP single camera / 36 MP dual camera)	LPDDR5X-8448 Octa-channel 16-bit (128-bit) @ 4224 MHz (135 GB/s)	X65 5G/LTE (5G: download up to 10 Gbit/s, upload up to 3.5 Gbit/s; LTE Cat 22: download up to 2.5 Gbit/s, upload up to 316 Mbit/s)	FastConnect 7800, Bluetooth 5.4; 802.11ac/ax/be (Wi-Fi 7) 2x2 (MU-MIMO) @ 3.6 Gbit/s; GPS, GLONASS, BeiDou, Galileo, QZSS, SBAS, USB4; UFS 4.0, NVMe SSD	April 24, 2024	Q2 2024
Snapdragon X Plus	X1P-66-100	4 nm (TSMC N4)	172.7 mm^{2}	Oryon 10 core (3.4 GHz, single-core boost up to 4.0 GHz)	Adreno; X1-85; 1250 MHz (3.8 TFLOPS)	Hexagon (45 TOPS)	Spectra (64 MP single camera / 36 MP dual camera)	LPDDR5X-8448 Octa-channel 16-bit (128-bit) @ 4224 MHz (135 GB/s)	X65 5G/LTE (5G: download up to 10 Gbit/s, upload up to 3.5 Gbit/s; LTE Cat 22: download up to 2.5 Gbit/s, upload up to 316 Mbit/s)	FastConnect 7800, Bluetooth 5.4; 802.11ac/ax/be (Wi-Fi 7) 2x2 (MU-MIMO) @ 3.6 Gbit/s; GPS, GLONASS, BeiDou, Galileo, QZSS, SBAS, USB4; UFS 4.0, NVMe SSD	April 24, 2024	Q2 2024
Snapdragon X Elite	X1E-78-100	4 nm (TSMC N4)	172.7 mm^{2}	Oryon 12 core (3.4 GHz)	Adreno; X1-85; 1250 MHz (3.8 TFLOPS)	Hexagon (45 TOPS)	Spectra (64 MP single camera / 36 MP dual camera)	LPDDR5X-8448 Octa-channel 16-bit (128-bit) @ 4224 MHz (135 GB/s)	X65 5G/LTE (5G: download up to 10 Gbit/s, upload up to 3.5 Gbit/s; LTE Cat 22: download up to 2.5 Gbit/s, upload up to 316 Mbit/s)	FastConnect 7800, Bluetooth 5.4; 802.11ac/ax/be (Wi-Fi 7) 2x2 (MU-MIMO) @ 3.6 Gbit/s; GPS, GLONASS, BeiDou, Galileo, QZSS, SBAS, USB4; UFS 4.0, NVMe SSD	October 24, 2023	Q2 2024
Snapdragon X Elite	X1E-80-100	4 nm (TSMC N4)	172.7 mm^{2}	Oryon 12 core (3.4 GHz, single and dual-core boost up to 4.0 GHz)	Adreno; X1-85; 1250 MHz (3.8 TFLOPS)	Hexagon (45 TOPS)	Spectra (64 MP single camera / 36 MP dual camera)	LPDDR5X-8448 Octa-channel 16-bit (128-bit) @ 4224 MHz (135 GB/s)	X65 5G/LTE (5G: download up to 10 Gbit/s, upload up to 3.5 Gbit/s; LTE Cat 22: download up to 2.5 Gbit/s, upload up to 316 Mbit/s)	FastConnect 7800, Bluetooth 5.4; 802.11ac/ax/be (Wi-Fi 7) 2x2 (MU-MIMO) @ 3.6 Gbit/s; GPS, GLONASS, BeiDou, Galileo, QZSS, SBAS, USB4; UFS 4.0, NVMe SSD	October 24, 2023	Q2 2024
Snapdragon X Elite	X1E-84-100	4 nm (TSMC N4)	172.7 mm^{2}	Oryon 12 core (3.8 GHz, single and dual-core boost up to 4.2 GHz)	Adreno; X1-85; 1500 MHz (4.6 TFLOPS)	Hexagon (45 TOPS)	Spectra (64 MP single camera / 36 MP dual camera)	LPDDR5X-8448 Octa-channel 16-bit (128-bit) @ 4224 MHz (135 GB/s)	X65 5G/LTE (5G: download up to 10 Gbit/s, upload up to 3.5 Gbit/s; LTE Cat 22: download up to 2.5 Gbit/s, upload up to 316 Mbit/s)	FastConnect 7800, Bluetooth 5.4; 802.11ac/ax/be (Wi-Fi 7) 2x2 (MU-MIMO) @ 3.6 Gbit/s; GPS, GLONASS, BeiDou, Galileo, QZSS, SBAS, USB4; UFS 4.0, NVMe SSD	October 24, 2023	Q2 2024
Snapdragon X Elite	X1E-00-1DE	4 nm (TSMC N4)	172.7 mm^{2}	Oryon 12 core (3.8 GHz, single and dual-core boost up to 4.3 GHz)	Adreno; X1-85; 1500 MHz (4.6 TFLOPS)	Hexagon (45 TOPS)	Spectra (64 MP single camera / 36 MP dual camera)	LPDDR5X-8448 Octa-channel 16-bit (128-bit) @ 4224 MHz (135 GB/s)	X65 5G/LTE (5G: download up to 10 Gbit/s, upload up to 3.5 Gbit/s; LTE Cat 22: download up to 2.5 Gbit/s, upload up to 316 Mbit/s)	FastConnect 7800, Bluetooth 5.4; 802.11ac/ax/be (Wi-Fi 7) 2x2 (MU-MIMO) @ 3.6 Gbit/s; GPS, GLONASS, BeiDou, Galileo, QZSS, SBAS, USB4; UFS 4.0, NVMe SSD	October 24, 2023	Q2 2024

=== Snapdragon X2 series ===
The Snapdragon X2 series is the successor generation to the X1 series for Windows PCs, introduced by Qualcomm in late 2025 with higher-tier Snapdragon X2 Elite and X2 Elite Extreme variants and followed in early 2026 by the Snapdragon X2 Plus tier. Qualcomm's published materials describe the X2 generation as increasing the platform's on-device AI capability to an 80 TOPS Hexagon NPU and scaling CPU configurations up to 18 Oryon-branded cores in the flagship tier, while product announcements and coverage indicate initial device availability in 2026.

Product name	Model number	Fab	Die size	CPU (Cores/Freq)	GPU	DSP/NPU	ISP	Memory technology	Modem (external/optional)	Connectivity (external)	Announcement date	Sampling availability
Snapdragon X2 Plus	X2P-42-100	3 nm (TSMC N3P+N3X)		Oryon 6 core (4.04 GHz)	Adreno; X2-45; 910 MHz	Hexagon (80 TOPS)	Spectra (36 MP single/38 MP dual camera)	LPDDR5X-9523 Octa-channel 16-bit (128-bit) @ 4761.5 MHz (152 GB/s)	X65 5G/LTE (5G: download up to 10 Gbit/s, upload up to 3.5 Gbit/s; LTE Cat 22: download up to 2.5 Gbit/s, upload up to 316 Mbit/s)	FastConnect 7800, Bluetooth 5.4; 802.11ac/ax/be (Wi-Fi 7) 2x2 (MU-MIMO) @ 3.6 Gbit/s; GPS, GLONASS, BeiDou, Galileo, QZSS, SBAS, USB4; UFS 4.0, NVMe SSD	January 5, 2026	Q1 2026
Snapdragon X2 Plus	X2P-64-100	3 nm (TSMC N3P+N3X)		Oryon 10 core (4.04 GHz)	Adreno; X2-45; 1700 MHz	Hexagon (80 TOPS)	Spectra (36 MP single/38 MP dual camera)	LPDDR5X-9523 Octa-channel 16-bit (128-bit) @ 4761.5 MHz (152 GB/s)	X65 5G/LTE (5G: download up to 10 Gbit/s, upload up to 3.5 Gbit/s; LTE Cat 22: download up to 2.5 Gbit/s, upload up to 316 Mbit/s)	FastConnect 7800, Bluetooth 5.4; 802.11ac/ax/be (Wi-Fi 7) 2x2 (MU-MIMO) @ 3.6 Gbit/s; GPS, GLONASS, BeiDou, Galileo, QZSS, SBAS, USB4; UFS 4.0, NVMe SSD	January 5, 2026	Q1 2026
Snapdragon X2 Elite	X2E-78-100	3 nm (TSMC N3P+N3X)		Oryon 12 core (4.0 GHz)	Adreno X2-85 1350 MHz	Hexagon (80 TOPS)	Spectra (36 MP single/38 MP dual camera)	LPDDR5X-9523 Octa-channel 16-bit (128-bit) @ 4761.5 MHz (152 GB/s)	X65 5G/LTE (5G: download up to 10 Gbit/s, upload up to 3.5 Gbit/s; LTE Cat 22: download up to 2.5 Gbit/s, upload up to 316 Mbit/s)	FastConnect 7800, Bluetooth 5.4; 802.11ac/ax/be (Wi-Fi 7) 2x2 (MU-MIMO) @ 3.6 Gbit/s; GPS, GLONASS, BeiDou, Galileo, QZSS, SBAS, USB4; UFS 4.0, NVMe SSD		Q1 2026
Snapdragon X2 Elite	X2E-80-100	3 nm (TSMC N3P+N3X)		Oryon 12 core (4.0 GHz, single-core boost up to 4.7 GHz, dual-core boost up to 4.4 GHz)	Adreno; X2-85; 1700 MHz	Hexagon (80 TOPS)	Spectra (36 MP single/38 MP dual camera)	LPDDR5X-9523 Octa-channel 16-bit (128-bit) @ 4761.5 MHz (152 GB/s)	X65 5G/LTE (5G: download up to 10 Gbit/s, upload up to 3.5 Gbit/s; LTE Cat 22: download up to 2.5 Gbit/s, upload up to 316 Mbit/s)	FastConnect 7800, Bluetooth 5.4; 802.11ac/ax/be (Wi-Fi 7) 2x2 (MU-MIMO) @ 3.6 Gbit/s; GPS, GLONASS, BeiDou, Galileo, QZSS, SBAS, USB4; UFS 4.0, NVMe SSD	September 24, 2025	Q4 2025
Snapdragon X2 Elite	X2E-84-100	3 nm (TSMC N3P+N3X)		Oryon 12 core (4.0 GHz, single-core and dual core boost up to 4.7 GHz)	Adreno; X2-85; 1700 MHz	Hexagon (85 TOPS)	Spectra (36 MP single/38 MP dual camera)	LPDDR5X-9523 Octa-channel 16-bit (128-bit) @ 4761.5 MHz (152 GB/s)	X65 5G/LTE (5G: download up to 10 Gbit/s, upload up to 3.5 Gbit/s; LTE Cat 22: download up to 2.5 Gbit/s, upload up to 316 Mbit/s)	FastConnect 7800, Bluetooth 5.4; 802.11ac/ax/be (Wi-Fi 7) 2x2 (MU-MIMO) @ 3.6 Gbit/s; GPS, GLONASS, BeiDou, Galileo, QZSS, SBAS, USB4; UFS 4.0, NVMe SSD		Q1 2026
Snapdragon X2 Elite	X2E-88-100	3 nm (TSMC N3P+N3X)		Oryon 18 core (4.0 GHz, single-core and dual-core boost up to 4.7 GHz)	Adreno; X2-90; 1700 MHz (6.9 TFLOPS)	Hexagon (80 TOPS)	Spectra (36 MP single/38 MP dual camera)	LPDDR5X-9523 Octa-channel 16-bit (128-bit) @ 4761.5 MHz (152 GB/s)	X65 5G/LTE (5G: download up to 10 Gbit/s, upload up to 3.5 Gbit/s; LTE Cat 22: download up to 2.5 Gbit/s, upload up to 316 Mbit/s)	FastConnect 7800, Bluetooth 5.4; 802.11ac/ax/be (Wi-Fi 7) 2x2 (MU-MIMO) @ 3.6 Gbit/s; GPS, GLONASS, BeiDou, Galileo, QZSS, SBAS, USB4; UFS 4.0, NVMe SSD	September 24, 2025	Q4 2025
Snapdragon X2 Elite	X2E-90-100	3 nm (TSMC N3P+N3X)		Oryon 18 core (4.0 GHz, single-core and dual-core boost up to 5.0 GHz)	Adreno; X2-90; 1700 MHz (6.9 TFLOPS)	Hexagon (85 TOPS)	Spectra (36 MP single/38 MP dual camera)	LPDDR5X-9523 Octa-channel 16-bit (128-bit) @ 4761.5 MHz (152 GB/s)	X65 5G/LTE (5G: download up to 10 Gbit/s, upload up to 3.5 Gbit/s; LTE Cat 22: download up to 2.5 Gbit/s, upload up to 316 Mbit/s)	FastConnect 7800, Bluetooth 5.4; 802.11ac/ax/be (Wi-Fi 7) 2x2 (MU-MIMO) @ 3.6 Gbit/s; GPS, GLONASS, BeiDou, Galileo, QZSS, SBAS, USB4; UFS 4.0, NVMe SSD		Q1 2026
Snapdragon X2 Elite Extreme	X2E-94-100	3 nm (TSMC N3P+N3X)		Oryon 18 core (4.4 GHz, single-core and dual-core boost up to 4.7 GHz)	Adreno; X2-90; 1850 MHz (7.5 TFLOPS)	Hexagon (80 TOPS)	Spectra (36 MP single/38 MP dual camera)	LPDDR5X-9523 Dodeca-channel 16-bit (192-bit) @ 4761.5 MHz (228 GB/s)	X65 5G/LTE (5G: download up to 10 Gbit/s, upload up to 3.5 Gbit/s; LTE Cat 22: download up to 2.5 Gbit/s, upload up to 316 Mbit/s)	FastConnect 7800, Bluetooth 5.4; 802.11ac/ax/be (Wi-Fi 7) 2x2 (MU-MIMO) @ 3.6 Gbit/s; GPS, GLONASS, BeiDou, Galileo, QZSS, SBAS, USB4; UFS 4.0, NVMe SSD		Q1 2026
Snapdragon X2 Elite Extreme	X2E-96-100	3 nm (TSMC N3P+N3X)		Oryon 18 core (4.4 GHz, single-core and dual-core boost up to 5.0 GHz)	Adreno; X2-90; 1850 MHz (7.5 TFLOPS)	Hexagon (80 TOPS)	Spectra (36 MP single/38 MP dual camera)	LPDDR5X-9523 Dodeca-channel 16-bit (192-bit) @ 4761.5 MHz (228 GB/s)	X65 5G/LTE (5G: download up to 10 Gbit/s, upload up to 3.5 Gbit/s; LTE Cat 22: download up to 2.5 Gbit/s, upload up to 316 Mbit/s)	FastConnect 7800, Bluetooth 5.4; 802.11ac/ax/be (Wi-Fi 7) 2x2 (MU-MIMO) @ 3.6 Gbit/s; GPS, GLONASS, BeiDou, Galileo, QZSS, SBAS, USB4; UFS 4.0, NVMe SSD	September 24, 2025	Q4 2025

== Hardware codec supported ==
See: Qualcomm Hexagon

== Wearable platforms ==
Model number	Product name	Fab	CPU	Co-processor	GPU	DSP/NPU	Memory technology	Modem	Connectivity	Announcement date	Sampling availability
?	Wear 1100	28 nm	1 core up to 1.2 GHz Cortex-A7 (ARMv7)	—N/a	Fixed Function GPU		LPDDR2	Integrated 2G/3G/LTE (Cat 1, up to 10/5 Mbit/s)	Bluetooth 4.1; 802.11a/b/g/n/ac; GPS, GLONASS, Galileo, BeiDou	May 30, 2016	Q2 2016
?	Wear 1200	28 nm	1 core up to 1.3 GHz Cortex-A7 (ARMv7)	—N/a	Fixed Function GPU		LPDDR2	Integrated 2G/LTE (Cat M1, up to 300/350 kbit/s)	Bluetooth 4.2; 802.11a/b/g/n/ac; GPS, GLONASS, Galileo, BeiDou	June 27, 2017	Q2 2017
MSM8909w	Wear 2100	28 nm	4 cores up to 1.2 GHz Cortex-A7 (ARMv7)	—N/a	Adreno 304	Hexagon	LPDDR3 400 MHz	X5 2G/3G/LTE (Cat 4, up to 150/50 Mbit/s)	Bluetooth 4.1; (Note: Bluetooth 4.2 for Wear 3100) 802.11b/g/n; NFC; GPS, GLONASS, Galileo, BeiDou	February 10, 2016	Q1 2016
MSM8909w	Wear 2500	28 nm	4 cores up to 1.2 GHz Cortex-A7 (ARMv7)	—N/a	Adreno 304	Hexagon	LPDDR3 400 MHz	X5 2G/3G/LTE (Cat 4, up to 150/50 Mbit/s)	Bluetooth 4.1; 802.11b/g/n; NFC; GPS, GLONASS, Galileo, BeiDou	June 26, 2018	Q2 2018
MSM8909w	Wear 3100	28 nm	4 cores up to 1.2 GHz Cortex-A7 (ARMv7)	QCC1110 (1 core 50 MHz Cortex-M0)	Adreno 304	Hexagon	LPDDR3 400 MHz	X5 2G/3G/LTE (Cat 4, up to 150/50 Mbit/s)	Bluetooth 4.1; 802.11b/g/n; NFC; GPS, GLONASS, Galileo, BeiDou	September 10, 2018	Q3 2018
SDM429w	Wear 4100	12 nm	4 cores up to 1.7 GHz Cortex-A53 (ARMv8-A)	—N/a	Adreno 504 320 MHz	Hexagon QDSP6 V56	LPDDR3 Single-channel; 32-bit 750 MHz (6.0 GiB/s)	X5 2G/3G/LTE (Cat 4, up to 150/50 Mbit/s)	Bluetooth 5.0; 802.11a/b/g/n; NFC; GPS; GLONASS, Galileo, BeiDou	June 30, 2020	Q2 2020
SDM429w	Wear 4100+	12 nm + 28 nm	4 cores up to 1.7 GHz Cortex-A53 (ARMv8-A)	QCC1110 (1 core 50 MHz Cortex-M0)	Adreno 504 320 MHz	Hexagon QDSP6 V56	LPDDR3 Single-channel; 32-bit 750 MHz (6.0 GiB/s)	X5 2G/3G/LTE (Cat 4, up to 150/50 Mbit/s)	Bluetooth 5.0; 802.11a/b/g/n; NFC; GPS; GLONASS, Galileo, BeiDou	June 30, 2020	Q2 2020
SW5100	W5 Gen 1	4 nm	4 cores up to 1.7 GHz Cortex-A53 (ARMv8-A)	—N/a	Adreno A702 1 GHz	Hexagon DSP V66K	LPDDR4 Single-channel; 16-bit 2133 MHz (8.5 GiB/s)	Integrated 2G/3G/LTE (Cat 4, up to 150/50 Mbit/s)	Bluetooth 5.0; 802.11a/b/g/n; NFC; GPS; GLONASS, Galileo, BeiDou	July 19, 2022	Q3 2022
SW5100	W5+ Gen 1	4 nm + 22 nm	4 cores up to 1.7 GHz Cortex-A53 (ARMv8-A)	QCC5100 (1 core 250 MHz Cortex-M55 + Ethos-U55)	Adreno A702 1 GHz	Hexagon DSP V66K	LPDDR4 Single-channel; 16-bit 2133 MHz (8.5 GiB/s)	Integrated 2G/3G/LTE (Cat 4, up to 150/50 Mbit/s)	Bluetooth 5.3; 802.11a/b/g/n; NFC; GPS; GLONASS, Galileo, BeiDou	July 19, 2022	Q3 2022
W5/W5+ Gen 2	W5 Gen 2	4 nm	4 cores up to 1.7 GHz Cortex-A53 (ARMv8-A)	—N/a	Adreno A702 1 GHz	Hexagon DSP V66K	LPDDR4 Single-channel; 16-bit 2133 MHz (8.5 GiB/s)	Integrated 2G/3G/LTE (Release 17 w/Category 1bix)	Bluetooth 5.3; 802.11a/b/g/n; NFC; GPS; GLONASS, Galileo, BeiDou, NB-NTN	August 20, 2025	-
W5/W5+ Gen 2	W5+ Gen 2	4 nm + 22 nm	4 cores up to 1.7 GHz Cortex-A53 (ARMv8-A)	QCC5100 (1 core 250 MHz Cortex-M55 + Ethos-U55)	Adreno A702 1 GHz	Hexagon DSP V66K	LPDDR4 Single-channel; 16-bit 2133 MHz (8.5 GiB/s)	Integrated 2G/3G/LTE (Release 17 w/Category 1bix)	Bluetooth 5.3; 802.11a/b/g/n; NFC; GPS; GLONASS, Galileo, BeiDou, NB-NTN	August 20, 2025	-
SW6100; SW6100P	Snapdragon Wear Elite	3 nm	1× Cortex-A78 up to 2.1 GHz + 4× Cortex-A55 up to 1.95 GHz (ARMv8-A)	500 MHz	Adreno A622	Hexagon (12 TOPS)	LPDDR5 Single-channel; 16-bit 3200 MHz (12.8 GiB/s)	5G RedCap Rel-17; LTE TDD/FDD; 3G/WCDMA; NB-NTN	Bluetooth 5.3/6.0; Wi-Fi 6 (802.11ax, 2.4/5/6 GHz, 1×1); UWB; GNSS (L1/L5); NFC; GPS; GLONASS, Galileo, BeiDou, NB-NTN, NavIC, QZSS	March 2, 2026	–

== Automotive platforms ==
The Snapdragon 602A, for application in the motor industry, was announced on January 6, 2014.
The Snapdragon 820A was announced on January 6, 2016.

Snapdragon Automotive Cockpit platform

- SA4150P
- SA4155P
- SA6145P
- SA6150P
- SA6155
- SA6155P •
- SA7255P
- SA8145P
- SA8150P
- SA8155
- SA8155P •
- SA8195P •
- SA8255P •
- SA8295P •

Snapdragon Ride Elite & Ride & Ride Flex platform

- SA8540P
- SA8620P
- SA8650P
- SA8770P
- SA8775P
- SA9000P • AI Accelerator

Snapdragon Cockpit Elite

- Snapdragon Digital Chassis

Snapdragon Ride Elite

- Qualcomm Oryon CPU

Product name (Model number)	Fab	CPU (Core / Freq)	GPU	DSP	Memory technology	Modem	Connectivity	Sampling availability
Snapdragon; 602A (APQ8064-AU)	28 nm (TSMC 28LP)	Krait 300; 4 cores 1.51 GHz (ARMv7)	Adreno 320; 400 MHz (76.8 GFLOPs) (2048x1536 + 1080p external display)	Hexagon; QDSP6 V4; 500 MHz	LPDDR3; Dual-channel 32-bit 533 MHz (8.5 GB/s)	External: Gobi MDM9615: LTE: FDD/TDD Cat3; CDMA: EV-DOrB/rA 1x; UMTS: TD-SCDMA, DC-HSPA+/HSPA; GSM: EDGE/GPRS	Bluetooth 4.1 + BLE; Qualcomm VIVE; QCA6574; 802.11ac (Wi-Fi 5); 2x2 (MU-MIMO)	Q1 2014
Snapdragon; 820AM (APQ8096AU/ MSM8996AU)	14 nm (Samsung 14LPP)	Kryo 2 + 2 cores (2.15 GHz Gold + 1.59 GHz Silver) (ARMv8)	Adreno 530; 624 MHz (319.4 GFLOPs)	Hexagon 680; 1.0 GHz	LPDDR4X; Dual-channel 32-bit (64-bit); 1866 MHz (29.9 GB/s)	Internal: APQ: no MSM: X12 LTE: Download: Cat 12, 600 Mbit/s; Upload: Cat 13, 150 Mbit/s	Bluetooth 4.1; 802.11ac (Wi-Fi 5); IZat Gen8C	Q1 2016
SA6155P	11 nm (Samsung 11LPP)	Kryo 460; 2 + 6 cores (2.0 GHz Gold + 1.6 GHz Silver)	Adreno 608/612; 430 MHz (110 GFLOPs)	Hexagon 685; V6 DSP, Spectra 230 ISP	LPDDR4X; Dual-channel 16-bit (32-bit); 2133 MHz (17.0 GB/s)	Internal: no	Bluetooth 5.0; 802.11ac (Wi-Fi 5); GPS, Glonass, Beidou, Galileo, QZSS, SBAS	Q1 2019
Snapdragon; 855A (SA8155P)	7 nm (TSMC N7)	Kryo 485; 1 + 3 + 4 cores (2.96 GHz Prime + 2.42 GHz Gold + 1.79 GHz Silver)	Adreno 640; 675 MHz (1036.8 GFLOPs)	Hexagon 690 (10 TOPS)	LPDDR4X; Quad-channel 16-bit (64-bit); 2133 MHz (34.1 GB/s)	X24 LTE Modem: FDD·TDD Cat.20; 2Gbps/316Mbps 7·3CA / VoLTE, 3G GSM, CDMA 2000, TD-SCDMA, 2G GSM/CDMA	Bluetooth 5.0; 802.11ax (Wi-Fi 6); GPS, Glonass, Beidou, Galileo, QZSS, SBAS	Q1 2021
SA8195P	7 nm (TSMC N7)	Kryo 495; 4 + 4 cores (Cortex-A76 + Cortex-A55)	Adreno 680; 600 MHz (1843.2 GFLOPs)	Hexagon	LPDDR4X; Quad-channel 16-bit (64-bit); 2133 MHz (34.1 GB/s)	Internal: no	Bluetooth 5.0; 802.11ax (Wi-Fi 6); GPS, Glonass, Beidou, Galileo, QZSS, SBAS	
SA8255P	5 nm (Samsung 5LPE)	Kryo 4 + 4 cores (2.35 GHz Prime + 2.35 GHz Gold)	Adreno 663	Hexagon	LPDDR5; Hexa-channel 16-bit (96-bit); 3200 MHz (76.8 GB/s)	Internal: no	Bluetooth 5.2; 802.11ax (Wi-Fi 6); GPS, Glonass, Beidou, Galileo, QZSS, SBAS	
SA8295P	5 nm (Samsung 5LPE)	Kryo 695; 4 + 4 cores (2.56 GHz Cortex-X1 + 2.05 GHz Cortex-A78)	Adreno 695	Hexagon (30 TOPS)	LPDDR4X; Octa-channel 16-bit (128-bit); 2133 MHz (68.2 GB/s)	Internal: no	Bluetooth 5.2; 802.11ax (Wi-Fi 6); 2x2 (MU-MIMO) @ 1.7 Gbit/s; GPS, Glonass, Beidou, Galileo, QZSS, SBAS	2023

== Embedded platforms ==
The Snapdragon 410E Embedded and Snapdragon 600E Embedded were announced on September 28, 2016.
The Snapdragon 800 for Embedded
The Snapdragon 810 for Embedded
The Snapdragon 820E Embedded was announced on February 21, 2018.

Product name (Model number)	Fab	CPU (Cores/Freq)	GPU	DSP	ISP	Memory technology	Modem	Connectivity	Sampling availability
Snapdragon; 410E (APQ8016E)	28 nm (TSMC; 28LP)	4 cores up to 1.2 GHz; Cortex-A53 (ARMv8)	Adreno 306	Hexagon; QDSP6 V5; 691 MHz	Up to 13 MP camera	LPDDR2/3; Single-channel; 32-bit 533 MHz (4.2 GB/s)	none	Bluetooth 4.0, 802.11n, GPS	
Snapdragon; 600E (APQ8064E)	28 nm (TSMC; 28LP)	4 cores up to 1.5 GHz; Krait 300 (ARMv7)	Adreno 320; 400 MHz	Hexagon QDSP6 V4 500 MHz	Up to 21 MP camera	DDR3/DDR3L; Dual-channel; 533 MHz	none	Bluetooth 4.0, 802.11a/b/g/n/ac (2.4/5 GHz), IZat Gen8A	
Snapdragon; 800E (APQ8074)	28 nm (TSMC; 28HPM)	4 cores up to 2.3 GHz; Krait 400 (ARMv7)	Adreno 330	Hexagon; QDSP6 V5	Up to 55 MP camera	LPDDR3; Dual-channel; 32-bit 800 MHz (12.8 GB/s)	none	Bluetooth 4.1; 802.11n/ac (2.4/5 GHz); IZat Gen8B; NFC, Gigabit Ethernet, HDMI, DisplayPort, SATA, SDIO, UART, I2C, GPIOs, JTAG; USB 3.0/2.0	
Snapdragon; 810E (APQ8094)	20 nm (TSMC; 20SoC)	4 + 4 cores 2.0 GHz; Cortex-A57 + 1.55 GHz; Cortex-A53 (ARMv8)	Adreno 430; 650 MHz	Hexagon; V56; 800 MHz	Up to 55 MP camera	LPDDR4; Dual-channel; 32-bit 1600 MHz (25.6 GB/s)	none	Bluetooth 4.1; 802.11ac; IZat Gen8C	
Snapdragon; 820E (APQ8096)	14 nm FinFET (Samsung; 14LPP)	2 + 2 cores (2.15 GHz + 1.6 GHz); Kryo (ARMv8)	Adreno 530	Hexagon; 680; 825 MHz	Up to 28 MP camera	LPDDR4; Quad-channel; 16-bit (64-bit); 1866 MHz (29.8 GB/s)	none	Bluetooth 4.1; 802.11ac/ad; IZat Gen8C	

== Vision Intelligence Platform ==
The Qualcomm Vision Intelligence Platform was announced on April 11, 2018. The Qualcomm Vision Intelligence Platform is purpose built to bring powerful visual computing and edge computing for machine learning to a wide range of IoT devices.

Model number	Fab	CPU (ARMv8)	GPU	DSP	ISP	Memory technology	Modem	Connectivity	Quick Charge	Sampling availability
QCS603	10 nm (Samsung 10LPP)	2 + 2 cores (1.6 GHz Kryo 360 Gold + 1.7 GHz Kryo 360 Silver)	Adreno 615 (Quad HD + 4K Ultra HD external display)	Hexagon 685	Spectra 270 (Up to 24 MP camera / 16 MP dual)	LPDDR4X 16-bit 1866 MHz	none	Bluetooth 5.0, NFC, 802.11ac 1x1 (MU-MIMO) Wi-Fi up to 433 Mbit/s, GPS, GLONASS, Beidou, Galileo, QZSS, SBAS, USB 3.1	4+	
QCS605	10 nm (Samsung 10LPP)	8 cores up to 2.5 GHz Kryo 300	Adreno 615 (Quad HD + 4K Ultra HD external display)	Hexagon 685	Spectra 270 (Up to 32 MP camera / 16 MP dual)	LPDDR4X 16-bit 1866 MHz	none	Bluetooth 5.0, NFC, 802.11ac 2x2 (MU-MIMO) Wi-Fi up to 867 Mbit/s, GPS, GLONASS, Beidou, Galileo, QZSS, SBAS, USB 3.1	4+	

== Home Hub and Smart Audio platforms ==
The Qualcomm Smart Audio Platform (APQ8009 and APQ8017) was announced on June 14, 2017.
The Qualcomm 212 Home Hub (APQ8009) and Qualcomm 624 Home Hub (APQ8053) were announced on January 9, 2018.

The QCS400 Series was announced March 19, 2019.

Model number	Fab	CPU (Cores/Freq)	GPU	DSP	ISP	Audio	Memory technology	Modem	Connectivity	Sampling availability
APQ8009 (SDA212)	28 nm (TSMC 28LP)	4 cores up to 1.3 GHz; Cortex-A7 (ARMv7)	Adreno 304 (HD)	Hexagon 536	Up to 16 MP camera		LPDDR2/3 Single-channel 533 MHz	none	Bluetooth 4.2 + BLE, 802.11ac (2.4/5 GHz) Wi-Fi	
APQ8017	28 nm (TSMC 28LP)	4 cores up to 1.4 GHz; Cortex-A53 (ARMv8)	Adreno 308 (Full HD)	Hexagon 536			LPDDR3 Single-channel 667 MHz	none	Bluetooth 4.2 + BLE, 802.11ac (2.4/5 GHz) Wi-Fi	
APQ8053 (SDA624)	14 nm (Samsung 14LPP)	8 cores up to 1.8 GHz; Cortex-A53 (ARMv8)	Adreno 506 (Full HD+)	Hexagon 546	Up to 24 MP camera, 13 MP dual		LPDDR3	none	Bluetooth 4.2 + BLE, 802.11ac (2.4/5 GHz) Wi-Fi	
QCS403		Dual-core CPU	none	2x Hexagon V66		12× audio channels supported		none	Bluetooth 5.1; 802.11ax-ready, 802.11ac, 4x4 (MIMO); Zigbee/15.4	Q1 2019
QCS404		Quad-core CPU	none	2x Hexagon V66		12× audio channels supported		none	Bluetooth 5.1; 802.11ax-ready, 802.11ac, 4x4 (MIMO); Zigbee/15.4	Q1 2019
QCS405		Quad-core CPU	Adreno 306 (Full HD+)	2x Hexagon V66		12× audio channels supported		none	Bluetooth 5.1; 802.11ax-ready, 802.11ac, 4x4 (MIMO); Zigbee/15.4	Q1 2019
QCS407		Quad-core CPU	Adreno 306 (Full HD+)	2x Hexagon V66		32× audio channels supported		none	Bluetooth 5.1; 802.11ax-ready, 802.11ac, 4x4 (MIMO); Zigbee/15.4	Q1 2019

== Mixed Reality (MR) platforms ==
=== Snapdragon XR series ===
- Snapdragon XR1 was announced in May 2018, is designed for Augmented reality, Virtual reality and mixed reality.
- Snapdragon XR2 was announced in December 2019, and is a derivative of the Snapdragon 865.

It is used in the Meta Quest 2, the HTC Vive Focus 3 and the Pico 4.

- Snapdragon XR2+ Gen 1 was announced on October 11, 2022, and is used in the Meta Quest Pro.
- Snapdragon XR2 Gen 2 is announced in September 2023. Qualcomm claims improved performance compared to its predecessor XR2 5G.

The SoC can handle up to 10 concurrent sensors & cameras, per-eye resolution of 3K x 3K and 12ms full-color video pass-through.
It supports Wi-Fi 7 network. It is integrated into Meta Quest 3 and Pico 4 Ultra.

- Snapdragon XR2+ Gen 2 is an overclocked version of the XR2 Gen 2. It is integrated into Samsung Galaxy XR.

Product name	Fab	Die size	CPU (ARMv8)	GPU	DSP	ISP	Memory technology	Tracking	Connectivity	Sampling availability
XR1	10 nm (Samsung; 10LPP)		4x Kryo 385 Gold + 4x Kryo 385 Silver	Adreno 615	Hexagon 685	Spectra	LPDDR4X; Quad-channel 16-bit (64-bit)	3DoF and 6DoF head and controller tracking	Wi-Fi 5 Bluetooth 5	Q1 2019
XR2	7 nm (TSMC; N7+)		1x Kryo 585 Prime (2.84 GHz) + 3x Kryo 585 Gold (2.42 GHz) + 4x Kryo 585 Silver (1.80 GHz)	Adreno 650 (up to 2x 3K displays at 90 Hz)	Hexagon 698	Spectra (input from up to 7 cameras)	LPDDR4X; Quad-channel 16-bit (64-bit)	Full 6DoF head and controller tracking, as well as hand and finger tracking	Wi-Fi 6 Bluetooth 5; 5G	Q1 2020
XR2+ Gen 1	7 nm (TSMC; N7+)		1x Kryo 585 Prime (2.84 GHz) + 3x Kryo 585 Gold (2.42 GHz) + 4x Kryo 585 Silver (1.80 GHz)	Adreno 650 (up to 2x 3K displays at 90 Hz)	Hexagon 698	Spectra (input from up to 7 cameras)	LPDDR5; Quad-channel 16-bit (64-bit)	Full 6DoF head and controller tracking, as well as hand and finger tracking	Wi-Fi 6E; Bluetooth 5.2; 5G	Q4 2022
XR2 Gen 2	4 nm (Samsung; 4LPX)	115.8 mm^{2}	4x Kryo (Cortex-A78C 2.36 GHz) + 2x Kryo (Cortex-A78C 2.05 GHz)	Adreno 740 (up to 2x 3K displays at 90 Hz)	Hexagon	Spectra (input from up to 10 cameras)	LPDDR5X; Quad-channel 16-bit (64-bit)		Wi-Fi 7 Bluetooth 5.3; 5G	Q4 2023
XR2+ Gen 2	4 nm (Samsung; 4LPX)	115.8 mm^{2}	4x Kryo (Cortex-A78C) + 2x Kryo (Cortex-A78C)	Adreno 740 (up to 2x 4.3K displays at 90 Hz)	Hexagon	Spectra (input from up to 12 cameras)	LPDDR5X; Quad-channel 16-bit (64-bit)		Wi-Fi 7 Bluetooth 5.3; 5G	Q1 2024
Reality Elite			2x Kryo + 4x Kryo	Adreno (up to 2x 4.4K displays at 90 Hz)	Hexagon (48 TOPs)	Spectra (input from up to 12 cameras)	LPDDR5X; Quad-channel 16-bit (64-bit)		Wi-Fi 7 Bluetooth 6.0; 5G	Q2 2026

=== Snapdragon AR series ===
The Qualcomm Snapdragon AR2 Gen 1 Platform was announced November 17, 2022. It is intended for use in smart glasses.
On September 27, 2023 Qualcomm announced the Snapdragon AR1 Gen 1 Platform for slim and light AR glasses. It is designed to enable personal assistants, audio quality enhancement, visual search, and real-time translation using on-device AI acceleration. The platform supports binocular displays with up to 1280 x 1280 resolution for heads-up information and also content consumption. The new 14-bit ISP can capture 12MP photos and 6MP video recording & live-streaming. Head tracking is limited to 3DoF (three degrees of freedom).

== Gaming platforms ==
=== Snapdragon G series ===
In December 2021, Qualcomm announced the Snapdragon G3x Gen 1 Gaming Platform. The Razer Edge is the first device to use the platform.

The G3x Gen 1 is based on the Snapdragon 888+ as it has the same motherboard code name (Lahaina), the same CPU clusters with higher clock speeds, and the same GPU with a higher clock speed. Connectivity options also seem in line.

In August 2023, Qualcomm announced the Snapdragon G series platform designed for handheld gaming devices.

On March 19, 2025, Qualcomm revealed the Snapdragon G3 Gen 3, G2 Gen 2, and G1 Gen 2 platforms.

Product name	Fab	CPU (Cores/Freq)	GPU	Modem	Connectivity	Display	Sampling availability
G1 Gen 1	Unknown	Kryo (8 core)	Adreno A11	—N/a	Bluetooth 5.0; 802.11a/b/g/n/ac (Wi-Fi 5); 1x1	HD at 60 fps	Q4 2023
G1 Gen 2	4 nm (Samsung 4LPX)	2 + 6 cores (2x 2.4 GHz Kryo Gold – Cortex-A78 + 6x 1.96 GHz Kryo Silver – Cortex-A55)	Adreno A12 1010 MHz (258.6 GFLOPS in FP32)	X61 5G (5G NR Sub-6 & mmWave: download up to 2.5 Gbit/s, upload up to 900 Mbit/s)	Bluetooth 5.1; 802.11a/b/g/n/ac (Wi-Fi 5); 1x1	FHD+ up to 120 fps	Q1 2025
G2 Gen 1	4 nm (Samsung 4LPX)	Kryo; 4 + 4 cores (Cortex-A78 + Cortex-A55)	Adreno A21	X62 5G/LTE (5G NR Sub-6 & mmWave: download up to 4.4 Gbit/s, upload up to 1.6 Gbit/s)	FastConnect 6700; Bluetooth 5.0; 802.11a/b/g/n/ac/ax (Wi-Fi 6E); 2x2 (MU-MIMO) up to 2.9 Gbit/s;	FHD+ up to 144 fps	Q4 2023
G2 Gen 2	4 nm (TSMC N4P)	Kryo (Cortex-X4 + 4× Cortex-A720 + 3× Cortex-A520)	Adreno A22	X61 5G (5G NR Sub-6 & mmWave: download up to 2.5 Gbit/s, upload up to 900 Mbit/s)	FastConnect 7800; Bluetooth 5.3; 802.11a/b/g/n/ac/ax/be (Wi-Fi 7) up to 5.8 Gbit/s	QHD+ up to 144 fps	Q1 2025
G3x Gen 1	5 nm (Samsung 5LPE)	1x 3.0 GHz; Kryo 680 Prime (Cortex-X1) + 3x 2.42 GHz; Kryo 680 Gold (Cortex-A78) + 4x 1.80 GHz; Kryo 680 Silver Cortex-A55)	Adreno 660 900 MHz (1382.4 GFLOPs in FP32)	X60 5G (5G NR Sub-6 & mmWave: download up to 7.5 Gbit/s, upload up to 3 Gbit/s; LTE Cat 22: download up to 2.5 Gbit/s, upload up to 0.316 Gbit/s)	FastConnect 6900; Bluetooth 5.2; 802.11a/b/g/n/ac/ax (Wi-Fi 6E) up to 3.6 Gbit/s	FHD+ up to 144 fps	Q1 2023
G3x Gen 2	4 nm (TSMC N4)	1× 3.36 GHz; Kryo Prime (Cortex-X3) + 4× 2.8 GHz; Kryo Gold (2× Cortex-A715; 2× Cortex-A710) + 3× 2.02 GHz; Kryo Silver (Cortex-A510)	Adreno A32 1000 MHz (3072 GFLOPS in FP32)	X70 5G (5G NR Sub-6 & mmWave: download up to 10 Gbit/s, upload up to 3.5 Gbit/s)	FastConnect 7800; Bluetooth 5.3; 802.11a/b/g/n/ac/ax/be (Wi-Fi 7) up to 5.8 Gbit/s	FHD+ up to 144 fps	Q4 2023
G3 Gen 3	4 nm (TSMC N4P)	Kryo (1× 3.3 GHz Cortex-X4 + 3× 3.15 GHz Cortex-A720 + 2× 2.96 GHz Cortex-A720 + 2× 2.27 GHz Cortex-A520)	Adreno A33	X61 5G (5G NR Sub-6 & mmWave: download up to 2.5 Gbit/s, upload up to 900 Mbit/s)	FastConnect 7800; Bluetooth 5.3; 802.11a/b/g/n/ac/ax/be (Wi-Fi 7) up to 5.8 Gbit/s	QHD+ up to 144 fps	Q1 2025

== Bluetooth SoC platforms ==
Following Qualcomm's acquisition of CSR in 2015, Qualcomm designs ultra-low-power Bluetooth SoCs under the CSR, QCA and QCC brands for wireless headphones and earbuds. Qualcomm has worked with both Amazon and Google on reference designs to help manufacturers develop headsets with support for Alexa, Google Assistant and Google Fast Pair. Qualcomm announced the QCC5100 Series at CES 2018.

On January 28, 2020, the QCC304x and QCC514x SoCs were published as Bluetooth 5.2 certified by the Bluetooth SIG. On the previous day Qualcomm published a blog post on LE Audio, referring to the QCC5100 series. On March 25, 2020, the BLE Audio QCC304x and QCC514x SoCs were officially announced.

=== Qualcomm QCC300x Series Bluetooth audio SoCs ===
Model number	Fab	CPU	DSP	Bluetooth	Technologies support	Power consumption	DAC output / Digital microphone input	Sampling availability
QCC3001		RISC application processor (Up to 80 MHz)	Single core Qualcomm Kalimba DSP (Up to 80 MHz)	Bluetooth 5.0 Dual-mode Bluetooth	TrueWireless Stereo cVc audio		Mono / 2-mic	
QCC3002		RISC application processor (Up to 80 MHz)	Single core Qualcomm Kalimba DSP (Up to 80 MHz)	Bluetooth 5.0 Dual-mode Bluetooth	TrueWireless Stereo aptX Classic/HD/LL cVc audio		Mono / 2-mic	
QCC3003		RISC application processor (Up to 80 MHz)	Single core Qualcomm Kalimba DSP (Up to 80 MHz)	Bluetooth 5.0 Dual-mode Bluetooth	cVc audio		Stereo / 1-mic	
QCC3004		RISC application processor (Up to 80 MHz)	Single core Qualcomm Kalimba DSP (Up to 80 MHz)	Bluetooth 5.0 Dual-mode Bluetooth	cVc audio		Stereo / 2-mic	
QCC3005		RISC application processor (Up to 80 MHz)	Single core Qualcomm Kalimba DSP (Up to 80 MHz)	Bluetooth 5.0 Dual-mode Bluetooth	aptX Classic/HD/LL cVc audio		Stereo / 2-mic	

=== Qualcomm QCC30xx Series Bluetooth audio SoCs ===
Model number	Fab	CPU	DSP	Bluetooth	Technologies support	Power consumption	DAC output / Digital microphone input	Digital assistant activation	Sampling availability
QCC3020		Dual core 32-bit application processor (Up to 80 MHz)	Single core Qualcomm Kalimba DSP (Up to 120 MHz)	Bluetooth 5.0 Bluetooth Low Energy sensor hub, Dual-mode Bluetooth Bluetooth Speed: 2 Mbit/s	aptX Classic/HD/LL TrueWireless Stereo Plus cVc audio	~6mA (2DP streaming)	Mono / 2-mic	Button press	H1 2017
QCC3021		Dual core 32-bit application processor (Up to 80 MHz)	Single core Qualcomm Kalimba DSP (Up to 120 MHz)	Bluetooth 5.0 Bluetooth Low Energy sensor hub, Dual-mode Bluetooth Bluetooth Speed: 2 Mbit/s	aptX Classic/HD/LL TrueWireless Stereo Plus cVc audio	~6mA (2DP streaming)	Stereo / 1-mic	Button press	H1 2017
QCC3024		Dual core 32-bit application processor (Up to 80 MHz)	Single core Qualcomm Kalimba DSP (Up to 120 MHz)	Bluetooth 5.0 Bluetooth Low Energy sensor hub, Dual-mode Bluetooth Bluetooth Speed: 2 Mbit/s	cVc audio Google Fast Pair	~6mA (2DP streaming)	Stereo / 2-mic	Button press	H1 2017
QCC3026		Dual core 32-bit application processor (Up to 80 MHz)	Single core Qualcomm Kalimba DSP (Up to 120 MHz)	Bluetooth 5.0 Bluetooth Low Energy sensor hub, Dual-mode Bluetooth Bluetooth Speed: 2 Mbit/s	aptX Classic/HD/LL TrueWireless Stereo Plus cVc audio	~6mA (2DP streaming)	Mono / 2-mic	Button press	H1 2017
QCC3031		Dual core 32-bit application processor (Up to 80 MHz)	Single core Qualcomm Kalimba DSP (Up to 120 MHz)	Bluetooth 5.0 Bluetooth Low Energy sensor hub, Dual-mode Bluetooth Bluetooth Speed: 2 Mbit/s	aptX Classic/HD/LL TrueWireless Stereo Plus cVc audio	~6mA (2DP streaming)	Stereo / 1-mic	Button press	H1 2017
QCC3034		Dual core 32-bit application processor (Up to 80 MHz)	Single core Qualcomm Kalimba DSP (Up to 120 MHz)	Bluetooth 5.0 Bluetooth Low Energy sensor hub, Dual-mode Bluetooth Bluetooth Speed: 2 Mbit/s	aptX Classic/HD/LL cVc audio Google Fast Pair	~6mA (2DP streaming)	Mono / 2-mic	Button press	H1 2017
QCC3040		Dual core 32-bit application processor (Up to 80 MHz)	Single core Qualcomm Kalimba DSP (Up to 120 MHz)	Bluetooth 5.2 BLE Audio, Bluetooth Low Energy sensor hub, Bluetooth Low Energy, Dual-mode Bluetooth Bluetooth speed: 2 Mbit/s	aptX Classic/HD TrueWireless mirroring ANC (Feedforward/feedback and hybrid) cVc audio Google Fast Pair	<5 mA	Stereo / 2-mic	Button press	H1 2020
QCC3046		Dual core 32-bit application processor (Up to 80 MHz)	Single core Qualcomm Kalimba DSP (Up to 120 MHz)	Bluetooth 5.2 BLE Audio, Bluetooth Low Energy sensor hub, Bluetooth Low Energy, Dual-mode Bluetooth Bluetooth speed: 2 Mbit/s	aptX Classic/HD TrueWireless mirroring ANC (Feedforward/feedback and hybrid) cVc audio Google Fast Pair	<5 mA	Stereo / 2-mic	Button press	H1 2020

=== Qualcomm QCC510x Series Bluetooth audio SoCs ===
Model number	Fab	CPU	DSP	Bluetooth	Technologies support	Power consumption	Digital assistant activation	Sampling availability
QCC5120		Dual core 32-bit application processor (Up to 80 MHz)	Dual core Qualcomm Kalimba DSP (Up to 120 MHz)	Bluetooth 5.0 Bluetooth Low Energy, Bluetooth Low Energy sensor hub, Dual-mode Bluetooth Bluetooth Speed: 2 Mbit/s	aptX Classic/HD/LL eXtension program TrueWireless Stereo Plus ANC (FeedForward/Feedback and Hybrid) cVc audio Google Fast Pair	~6mA (2DP streaming) ~7mA HFP Narrow Band, 1 Digital MIC cVc	Button press Qualcomm Voice Activation	H1 2018
QCC5121		Dual core 32-bit application processor (Up to 80 MHz)	Dual core Qualcomm Kalimba DSP (Up to 120 MHz)	Bluetooth 5.0 Bluetooth Low Energy, Bluetooth Low Energy sensor hub, Dual-mode Bluetooth Bluetooth Speed: 2 Mbit/s	aptX Classic/HD/LL eXtension program TrueWireless Stereo Plus ANC (FeedForward/Feedback and Hybrid) cVc audio Google Fast Pair	~6mA (2DP streaming) ~7mA HFP Narrow Band, 1 Digital MIC cVc	Button press Qualcomm Voice Activation	H1 2018
QCC5124		Dual core 32-bit application processor (Up to 80 MHz)	Dual core Qualcomm Kalimba DSP (Up to 120 MHz)	Bluetooth 5.0 Bluetooth Low Energy, Bluetooth Low Energy sensor hub, Dual-mode Bluetooth Bluetooth Speed: 2 Mbit/s	aptX Classic/HD/LL eXtension program TrueWireless Stereo Plus ANC (FeedForward/Feedback and Hybrid) cVc audio Google Fast Pair	~6mA (2DP streaming) ~7mA HFP Narrow Band, 1 Digital MIC cVc	Button press Qualcomm Voice Activation	H1 2018
QCC5125		Dual core 32-bit application processor (Up to 80 MHz)	Single core Qualcomm Kalimba DSP (Up to 120 MHz)	Bluetooth 5.0 Bluetooth Low Energy, Bluetooth Low Energy sensor hub, Dual-mode Bluetooth Bluetooth Speed: 2 Mbit/s	aptX Classic/HD/LL eXtension program TrueWireless Stereo Plus ANC (FeedForward/Feedback) cVc audio Google Fast Pair	~10mA (2DP streaming) ~10mA HFP Narrow Band, 1 Digital MIC cVc	Button press	H1 2018
QCC5141		Dual core 32-bit application processor (Up to 80 MHz)	Dual core Qualcomm Kalimba DSP (Up to 120 MHz)	Bluetooth 5.2 BLE Audio, Bluetooth Low Energy sensor hub, Bluetooth Low Energy, Dual-mode Bluetooth Speed: 2 Mbit/s	aptX Adaptive eXtension program TrueWireless Mirroring ANC (FeedForward/Feedback) cVc audio Google Fast Pair	~5mA A2DP stream	Button press Qualcomm Voice Activation	H1 2020
QCC5144		Dual core 32-bit application processor (Up to 80 MHz)	Dual core Qualcomm Kalimba DSP (Up to 120 MHz)	Bluetooth 5.2 BLE Audio, Bluetooth Low Energy sensor hub, Bluetooth Low Energy, Dual-mode Bluetooth Speed: 2 Mbit/s	aptX Adaptive eXtension program TrueWireless Mirroring ANC (FeedForward/Feedback) cVc audio Google Fast Pair	~5mA A2DP stream	Button press Qualcomm Voice Activation	H1 2020

== See also ==
- List of Qualcomm systems on chips
- List of MediaTek systems on chips
- List of UNISOC systems on chips
