= List of MediaTek systems on chips =

List of MediaTek processors

MediaTek
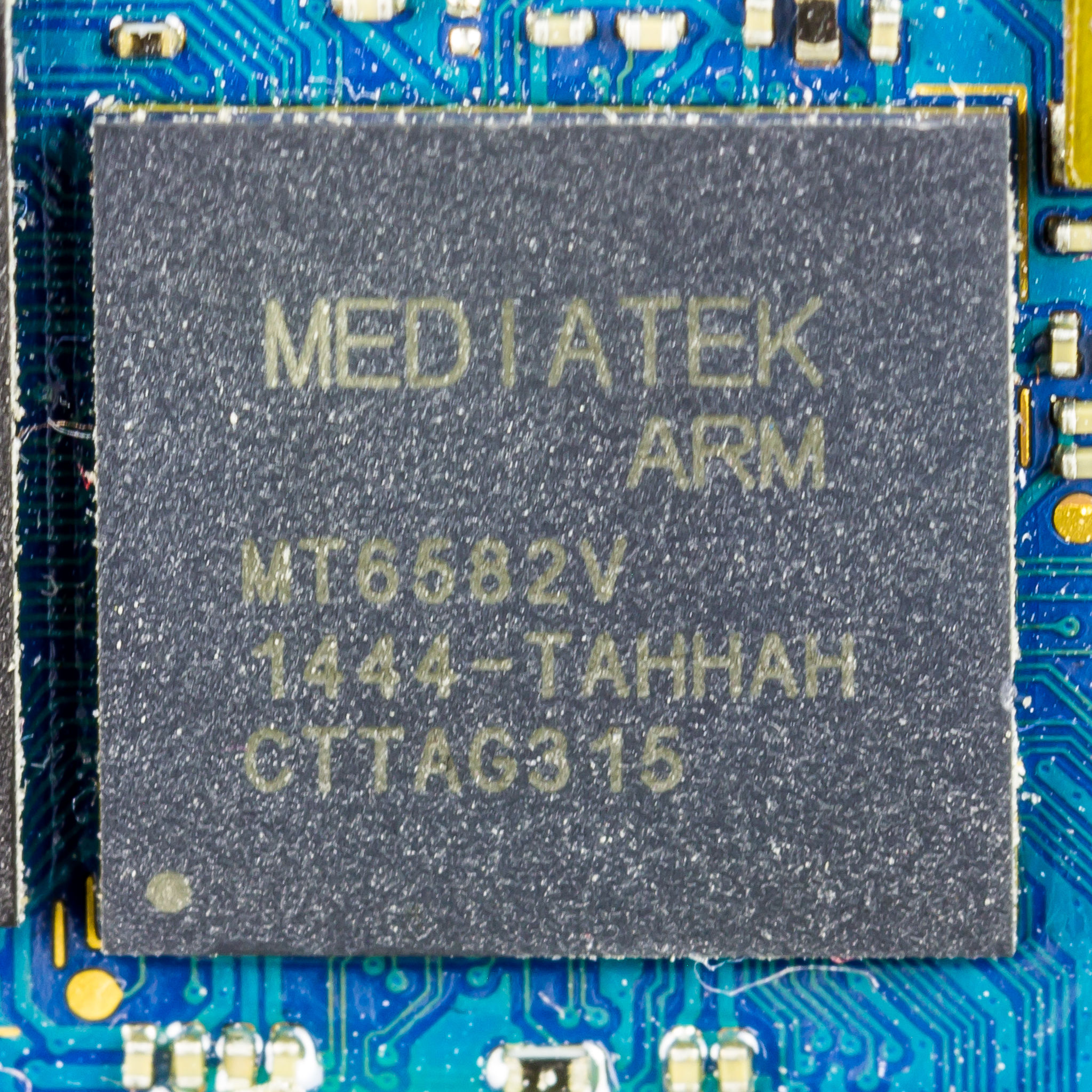
- MediaTek MT6582

General information
- Launched: 2003; 23 years ago
- Designed by: MediaTek

Physical specifications
- Cores: 1, 2, 4, 6, 8 or 10

Architecture and classification
- Application: Mobile SoC
- Microarchitecture: ARM11, Cortex-A5, Cortex-A7, Cortex-A53, Cortex-A55, Cortex-A57, Cortex-A72, Cortex-A73 Cortex-A75, Cortex-A76, Cortex-A77, Cortex-A78, Cortex-A510, Cortex-A710, Cortex-A715, Cortex-A720, Cortex-A725, C1-Pro, Cortex-X2, Cortex-X3, Cortex-X4, Cortex-X925, C1-Premium, C1-Ultra
- Instruction set: ARMv6, ARMv7-A, ARMv8-A, ARMv9-A

This is a list of MediaTek processors for use in smartphones, tablets, smartwatches, IoT, Wi-Fi routers and access points, smart TVs and smartbooks.

== Smartphone processors from ARMv5 to ARMv8 (2003–2019) ==
=== ARMv5 ===
Model number	CPU (ISA)	Fab	CPU (Core/Freq)	CPU cache	GPU	Memory technology	Wireless radio technologies	Released
MT6205	ARM7 (ARMv5TEJ)						GSM	
MT6216	ARM7 (ARMv5TEJ)				No GPU		GSM/GPRS Class 12 Modem	
MT6217	ARM7 (ARMv5TEJ)				No GPU		GSM/GPRS Class 12 Modem	
MT6218B	ARM7 (ARMv5TEJ)		ARM7EJ @ 52 MHz	16 KB I-Cache, 16 KB D-Cache	No GPU	8-bit or 16-bit up to 64 MB	GSM/GPRS Class 12 Modem	2003
MT6219	ARM7 (ARMv5TEJ)		ARM7EJ @ 52 MHz	16 KB I-Cache, 16 KB D-Cache	No GPU	8-bit or 16-bit up to 64 MB	GSM/GPRS Class 12 Modem	2003
MT6223	ARM7 (ARMv5TEJ)		ARM7EJ @ 52 MHz	16 KB I-Cache, 16 KB D-Cache	No GPU	8-bit or 16-bit up to 64 MB	GSM/GPRS Class 12 Modem	2003
MT6225	ARM7 (ARMv5TEJ)				No GPU		GSM/GPRS Class 12 Modem	
MT6226	ARM7 (ARMv5TEJ)		ARM7EJ @ 52 MHz	16 KB I-Cache, 16 KB D-Cache	No GPU	8-bit or 16-bit up to 64 MB	GSM/GPRS Class 12 Modem	2003
MT6227	ARM7 (ARMv5TEJ)		ARM7EJ @ 52 MHz	16 KB I-Cache, 16 KB D-Cache	No GPU	8-bit or 16-bit up to 64 MB	GSM/GPRS Class 12 Modem	2003
MT6228	ARM7 (ARMv5TEJ)		ARM7EJ @ 52 MHz	16 KB I-Cache, 16 KB D-Cache	No GPU	8-bit or 16-bit up to 64 MB	GSM/GPRS Class 12 Modem	2003
MT6229	ARM7 (ARMv5TEJ)		ARM7EJ-S @ 104 MHz	16 KB I-Cache, 16 KB D-Cache	No GPU	8-bit or 16-bit up to 64 MB	GSM/GPRS Class 12 Modem	2003
MT6230	ARM7 (ARMv5TEJ)		ARM7EJ-S @ 104 MHz	16 KB I-Cache, 16 KB D-Cache	No GPU	8-bit or 16-bit up to 64 MB	GSM/GPRS Class 12 Modem	2003
MT6235	ARM9 (ARMv5TEJ)		ARM926EJ-S @ 208 MHz		No GPU	8-bit or 16-bit up to 128 MB	GSM/GPRS/EDGE, Wi-Fi/GPS support	2007
MT6236	ARM9 (ARMv5TEJ)		ARM926EJ-S @ 312 MHz		No GPU	8-bit or 16-bit up to 128 MB	GSM/GPRS/EDGE, BT 2.1 EDR, HS 2.0 USB	2007
MT6252	ARM7 (ARMv5TEJ)		ARM7EJ-S @ 104 MHz	16 KB I-Cache, 16 KB D-Cache	No GPU	Emb. 32 MB pseudo-SRAM	GSM/GPRS Quad-band Class 12 Modem	2005
MT6253	ARM7 (ARMv5TEJ)		ARM7EJ-S @ 104 MHz	16 KB I-Cache, 16 KB D-Cache	No GPU	Emb. 32 MB pseudo-SRAM	GSM/GPRS Class 12 Modem	2005
MT6516	ARM9 (ARMv5TEJ)	65 nm	ARM926EJ-S @ 416 MHz		No GPU		CSD, GPRS, EDGE, Not 3G compatible	2009

=== ARMv6 ===
Model number	CPU (ISA)	Fab	CPU (Core/Freq)	CPU cache	GPU	Memory technology	Wireless radio technologies	Released
MT6276M	ARMv6	65 nm	single-core (32-bit); ARM11 (Jazelle) @ 520 MHz				GSM, GPRS, EDGE, Cl.12, Quad-band, HSPA Rel.6	
MT6513	ARMv6	65 nm (CMOS)	single-core (32-bit); ARM11 (Jazelle) @ 650 MHz		PowerVR SGX531 @ 281 MHz (2.2 GFLOPS in FP32)		Not 3G compatible (MT6573 without 3G)	
MT6573	ARMv6	65 nm (CMOS)	single-core (32-bit); ARM11 (Jazelle) @ 650 MHz		PowerVR SGX531 @ 281 MHz (2.2 GFLOPS in FP32)		3G, GSM, GPRS, UMTS, HSPA, HSDPA, HSUPA	2010

=== ARMv7 ===
Single core

Model number	CPU ISA	Fab	CPU (Core/Freq)	CPU cache	GPU	Memory technology	Wireless radio technologies	Released
MT6515	ARMv7	40 nm	1.0 GHz Single-core; ARM Cortex-A9		PowerVR SGX531 Ultra @ 522 MHz (4.1 GFLOPS in FP32)	LPDDR single-channel 32-bit 266 MHz (2.13 GB/s); LPDDR single-channel 32-bit 400 MHz (3.2 GB/s); LPDDR2 single-channel 32-bit 533 MHz (4.26 GB/s)	GSM, GPRS, TD-SCDMA, Not 3G compatible (MT6575 without 3G)	2012
MT6575	ARMv7	40 nm	1.0 GHz Single-core; ARM Cortex-A9	512 KB L2	PowerVR SGX531 Ultra @ 522 MHz (4.1 GFLOPS in FP32)	LPDDR single-channel 32-bit 266 MHz (2.13 GB/s); LPDDR single-channel 32-bit 400 MHz (3.2 GB/s); LPDDR2 single-channel 32-bit 533 MHz (4.26 GB/s)	3G, HSPA, GPRS, UMTS, W-CDMA, HSUPA, HSDPA	2011
MT6575M	ARMv7		1.0 GHz Single-core; ARM Cortex-A9	256 KB L2	PowerVR SGX531T @ 281 MHz (2.2 GFLOPS in FP32)	LPDDR single-channel 32-bit 266 MHz (2.13 GB/s); LPDDR single-channel 32-bit 400 MHz (3.2 GB/s); LPDDR2 single-channel 32-bit 533 MHz (4.26 GB/s)	3G, HSPA, GPRS, UMTS, W-CDMA, HSUPA, HSDPA	2012

Dual-core

Model number	CPU ISA	Fab	CPU (Core/Freq)	CPU cache	GPU	Memory technology	Wireless radio technologies	Released
MT6517	ARMv7	40 nm	1.0 GHz Dual-core; ARM Cortex-A9		PowerVR SGX531 Ultra @ 522 MHz (4.1 GFLOPS in FP32)	LPDDR/LPDDR2 single-channel 32-bit 266 MHz (2.13 GB/s)	CSD, GSM, GPRS, TD-SCDMA, TD-HSPA; Not 3G compatible (MT6577 without 3G)	2012
MT6517T	ARMv7	40 nm	1.2 GHz Dual-core; ARM Cortex-A9		PowerVR SGX531 Ultra @ 522 MHz (4.1 GFLOPS in FP32)	LPDDR/LPDDR2 single-channel 32-bit 266 MHz (2.13 GB/s)	CSD, GSM, GPRS, TD-SCDMA, TD-HSPA; Not 3G compatible (MT6577 without 3G)	
MT6577	ARMv7	40 nm	1.0 GHz Dual-core; ARM Cortex-A9		PowerVR SGX531 Ultra @ 522 MHz (4.1 GFLOPS in FP32)	LPDDR/LPDDR2 single-channel 32-bit 266 MHz (2.13 GB/s)	3G, GSM, GPRS, UMTS, HSPA+, HSDPA, HSUPA	2012
MT6577T	ARMv7	40 nm	1.2 GHz Dual-core; ARM Cortex-A9		PowerVR SGX531 Ultra @ 522 MHz (4.1 GFLOPS in FP32)	LPDDR/LPDDR2 single-channel 32-bit 266 MHz (2.13 GB/s)	3G, GSM, GPRS, UMTS, HSPA+, HSDPA, HSUPA	
MT6570	ARMv7	28 nm	1.3 GHz Dual-core; ARM Cortex-A7		Mali-400 MP1 @ 500 MHz (4.5 GFLOPS in FP32)	LPDDR/LPDDR2 single-channel 32-bit 266 MHz (2.13 GB/s)	GSM/EDGE (2G), Multi-mode Rel.8 HSPA+/TD-SCDMA (3G), Wi-Fi, FM, Bluetooth, GPS	2015
MT6571	ARMv7	28 nm	1.3 GHz Dual-core; ARM Cortex-A7	32 KB L1, 256 KB L2	Mali-400 MP1 @ 500 MHz (4.5 GFLOPS in FP32)	LPDDR/LPDDR2 single-channel 32-bit 266 MHz (2.13 GB/s)	GSM, GPRS, TD-SCDMA, GSM/EDGE (2G), Wi-Fi, FM, Bluetooth, GPS	Q3 2014
MT6572	ARMv7	28 nm	1.4 GHz Dual-core; ARM Cortex-A7	32 KB L1, 256 KB L2	Mali-400 MP1 @ 500 MHz (4.5 GFLOPS in FP32)	LPDDR/LPDDR2 single-channel 32-bit 266 MHz (2.13 GB/s)	Multi-mode Rel.8 HSPA+, TD-SCDMA, Wi-Fi, FM, Bluetooth, GPS	Q2 2013
MT6572M	ARMv7	28 nm	1.0 GHz Dual-core; ARM Cortex-A7	32 KB L1, 256 KB L2	Mali-400 MP1 @ 400 MHz (3.6 GFLOPS in FP32)	LPDDR/LPDDR2 single-channel 32-bit 266 MHz (2.13 GB/s)	GSM/EDGE (2G), Multi-mode Rel.8 HSPA+/TD-SCDMA (3G), Wi-Fi, FM, Bluetooth, GPS	2014

Quad-core

Model number	CPU ISA	Fab	CPU (Core/Freq)	CPU cache	GPU	Memory technology	Wireless radio technologies	Released
MT6580	ARMv7	28 nm	1.3 GHz Quad-core; ARM Cortex-A7	32 KB L1, 512 KB L2	Mali-400 MP1 @ 500 MHz (4.5 GFLOPS in FP32)	LPDDR2/LPDDR3 single-channel 32-bit 533 MHz (4.26 GB/s)	R8 HSPA+, TD-SCDMA, Wi-Fi, FM, Bluetooth, GPS	2015
MT6582M	ARMv7	28 nm	1.3 GHz Quad-core; ARM Cortex-A7	32 KB L1, 512 KB L2	Mali-400 MP2 @ 400 MHz (7.2 GFLOPS in FP32)	LPDDR2/LPDDR3 single-channel 32-bit 533 MHz (4.26 GB/s)	R8 HSPA+, TD-SCDMA, Wi-Fi, FM, Bluetooth, GPS	Q1 2014
MT6582	ARMv7	28 nm	1.3 GHz Quad-core; ARM Cortex-A7	32 KB L1, 512 KB L2	Mali-400 MP2 @ 500 MHz (9 GFLOPS in FP32)	LPDDR2/LPDDR3 single-channel 32-bit 533 MHz (4.26 GB/s)	GSM, GPRS, HSPA+, HSUPA, UMTS Rel. 8, TD-SCDMA, Wi-Fi, FM, Bluetooth, GPS	Q3 2013
MT6589M	ARMv7	28 nm	1.2 GHz Quad-core; ARM Cortex-A7	32 KB L1, 1 MB L2	PowerVR SGX544MP @ 156 MHz (4.9 GFLOPS in FP32)	LPDDR2/LPDDR3 single-channel 32-bit 533 MHz (4.26 GB/s)	3G, HSPA+, TD-SCDMA	Q2 2013
MT6589 (Note: previously known as MT6588)	ARMv7	28 nm	1.3 GHz Quad-core; ARM Cortex-A7	32 KB L1, 1 MB L2	PowerVR SGX544MP @ 266 MHz (8.5 GFLOPS in FP32)	LPDDR2/LPDDR3 single-channel 32-bit 533 MHz (4.26 GB/s)	3G, HSPA+, TD-SCDMA	Q1 2013
MT6589T	ARMv7	28 nm	1.5 GHz Quad-core; ARM Cortex-A7	32 KB L1, 1 MB L2	PowerVR SGX544MP @ 357 MHz (11.4 GFLOPS in FP32)	LPDDR; LPDDR2	3G, HSPA+, TD-SCDMA	Q3 2013
MT6588	ARMv7	28 nm (TSMC; 28HPM)	1.7 GHz Quad-core; ARM Cortex-A7	32 KB L1, 1 MB L2	Mali-450 MP4 @ 600 MHz (36 GFLOPS in FP32)	LPDDR2 single-channel 32-bit 533 MHz (4.26 GB/s); LPDDR3 single-channel 32-bit 666 MHz (5.3 GB/s)	R8 HSPA+/TD-SCDMA, Wi-Fi, FM, Bluetooth, GPS	Q4 2013

Hexa-core and octa-core

Model number	CPU ISA	Fab	CPU (Core/Freq)	CPU cache	GPU	Memory technology	Wireless radio technologies	Released
MT6591	ARMv7	28 nm (TSMC; 28HPM)	1.5 GHz Hexa-core; ARM Cortex-A7		Mali-450 MP4 @ 600 MHz (36 GFLOPS in FP32)	LPDDR2 single-channel 32-bit LPDDR3 single-channel 32-bit	GSM, GPRS, TD-SCDMA, UMTS, HSPA+, HSUPA	Q1 2014
MT6592M	ARMv7	28 nm (TSMC; 28HPM)	1.4 GHz Octa-core; ARM Cortex-A7	32 KB L1, 1 MB L2	Mali-450 MP4 @ 600 MHz (36 GFLOPS in FP32)	LPDDR2 single-channel 32-bit 533 MHz (4.26 GB/s); LPDDR3 single-channel 32-bit 666 MHz (5.3 GB/s)	R8 HSPA+/TD-SCDMA, Wi-Fi, FM, Bluetooth, GPS (Note: Although MediaTek advertises the MT6592 platform as supporting LTE (4G), the modem inside the MT6592 chip itself does not support LTE)	2014
MT6592	ARMv7	28 nm (TSMC; 28HPM)	1.7–2 GHz Octa-core; ARM Cortex-A7	32 KB L1, 1 MB L2	Mali-450 MP4 @ 700 MHz (42 GFLOPS in FP32)	LPDDR2 single-channel 32-bit 533 MHz (4.26 GB/s); LPDDR3 single-channel 32-bit 666 MHz (5.3 GB/s)	R8 HSPA+/TD-SCDMA, Wi-Fi, FM, Bluetooth, GPS	Q4 2013
MT6595M	ARMv7	28 nm (TSMC; 28HPM)	2.0 GHz Quad-core; ARM Cortex-A17; 1.5 GHz Quad-core; ARM Cortex-A7 (ARM big.LITTLE with GTS)	32 KB L1, 2 MB L2	PowerVR G6200 @ 450 MHz (57.6 GFLOPS in FP32)	LPDDR3 dual-channel 32-bit (64-bit); 933 MHz (14.9 GB/s)	WCDMA, TD-SCDMA, GSM, FDD/TDD-LTE, CMCC 3G, CMCC 4G, TD-LTE	Q1 2014
MT6595	ARMv7	28 nm (TSMC; 28HPM)	2.2 GHz Quad-core; ARM Cortex-A17; 1.7 GHz Quad-core; ARM Cortex-A7 (ARM big.LITTLE with GTS)	32 KB L1, 2 MB L2	PowerVR G6200 @ 600 MHz (76.8 GFLOPS in FP32)	LPDDR3 dual-channel 32-bit (64-bit); 933 MHz (14.9 GB/s)	WCDMA, TD-SCDMA, GSM, FDD/TDD-LTE, CMCC 3G, CMCC 4G, TD-LTE	Q1 2014

=== ARMv8 ===
Quad-core

Model number	CPU ISA	Fab	CPU (Core / Freq)	GPU	Memory technology	Wireless radio technologies	Released
MT6731	ARMv8-A (64-bit)	28 nm (TSMC 28HPM)	1.1 GHz quad-core ARM Cortex-A53	PowerVR GE8100 @ 350 MHz (5.6 GFLOPS in FP32)	LPDDR2/3 single-channel 32-bit 667 MHz (5.3 GB/s); 512 MB	GSM, UMTS, GPRS, HSPA+, HSUPA, LTE Cat 4	Q1 2019
MT6735P	ARMv8-A (64-bit)	28 nm (TSMC 28HPM)	1.0 GHz quad-core ARM Cortex-A53	Mali-T720 MP2 @ 400 MHz (16 GFLOPS in FP32)	LPDDR3 single-channel 32-bit 533 MHz (4.2 GB/s) up to 3 GB	GSM, UMTS, GPRS, HSPA+, HSUPA, TD-SCDMA, EVDO, LTE Cat 4	Q2 2015
MT6735M	ARMv8-A (64-bit)	28 nm (TSMC 28HPM)	1.0 GHz quad-core ARM Cortex-A53	Mali-T720 MP2 @ 500 MHz (20 GFLOPS in FP32)	LPDDR3 single-channel 32-bit 533 MHz (4.2 GB/s) up to 3 GB	GSM, UMTS, GPRS, HSPA+, HSUPA, TD-SCDMA, EVDO, LTE Cat 4	Q2 2015
MT6735	ARMv8-A (64-bit)	28 nm (TSMC 28HPM)	1.3 GHz quad-core ARM Cortex-A53	Mali-T720 MP2 @ 600 MHz (24 GFLOPS in FP32)	LPDDR3 single-channel 32-bit 533 MHz (4.2 GB/s) up to 3 GB	GSM, UMTS, GPRS, HSPA+, HSUPA, TD-SCDMA, EVDO, LTE Cat 4	Q2 2015
MT6737	ARMv8-A (64-bit)	28 nm (TSMC 28HPM)	1.1-1.3 GHz quad-core ARM Cortex-A53	Mali-T720 MP2 @ 550–650 MHz (22–26 GFLOPS in FP32)	LPDDR3 single-channel 32-bit 533 MHz (4.2 GB/s) up to 3 GB	GSM, UMTS, GPRS, HSPA+, HSUPA, TD-SCDMA, EVDO, LTE Cat 4 VoLTE	Q2 2016
MT6737T	ARMv8-A (64-bit)	28 nm (TSMC 28HPM)	1.5 GHz quad-core ARM Cortex-A53	Mali-T720 MP2 @ 600 MHz (24 GFLOPS in FP32)	LPDDR2/3 single-channel 32-bit 733 MHz (5.8 GB/s) up to 3 GB	GSM, UMTS, GPRS, HSPA+, HSUPA, TD-SCDMA, EVDO, LTE Cat 4 VoLTE	Q2 2016
MT6732M	ARMv8-A (64-bit)	28 nm (TSMC 28HPM)	1.3 GHz quad-core ARM Cortex-A53	Mali-T760 MP2 @ 500 MHz (28 GFLOPS in FP32)	LPDDR3 single-channel 32-bit 800 MHz (6.4 GB/s)	GSM, UMTS, GPRS, HSPA+, HSUPA, TD-SCDMA, LTE Cat 4	Q3 2014
MT6732	ARMv8-A (64-bit)	28 nm (TSMC 28HPM)	1.5 GHz quad-core ARM Cortex-A53	Mali-T760 MP2 @ 500 MHz (28 GFLOPS in FP32)	LPDDR3 single-channel 32-bit 800 MHz (6.4 GB/s)	GSM, UMTS, GPRS, HSPA+, HSUPA, TD-SCDMA, LTE Cat 4	Q3 2014
MT6738	ARMv8-A (64-bit)	28 nm (TSMC 28HPM)	1.5 GHz quad-core ARM Cortex-A53	Mali-T860 MP2 @ 350 MHz (19.6 GFLOPS in FP32)	LPDDR3 single-channel 32-bit 667 MHz (5.3 GB/s) up to 4 GB	GSM, UMTS, GPRS, HSPA+, HSUPA, TD-SCDMA, EVDO, LTE Cat 6	2016
MT6738T	ARMv8-A (64-bit)	28 nm (TSMC 28HPM)	1.5 GHz quad-core ARM Cortex-A53	Mali-T860 MP2 @ 520 MHz (29.1 GFLOPS in FP32)	LPDDR3 single-channel 32-bit 667 MHz (5.3 GB/s) up to 4 GB	GSM, UMTS, GPRS, HSPA+, HSUPA, TD-SCDMA, EVDO, LTE Cat 6	2016
MT6739	ARMv8-A (64-bit)	28 nm (TSMC 28HPM)	1.5 GHz quad-core ARM Cortex-A53	PowerVR GE8100 @ 570 MHz (9.1 GFLOPS in FP32)	LPDDR3 single-channel 32-bit 667 MHz (5.3 GB/s) up to 3 GB	GSM, UMTS, GPRS, HSPA+, HSUPA, TD-SCDMA, LTE Cat 4	Q4 2017

Octa-core

Model number	CPU ISA	Fab	CPU (Core / Freq)	GPU	Memory technology	Wireless radio technologies	Released
MT6750	ARMv8-A (64-bit)	28 nm (TSMC 28HPM)	1.5 GHz quad-core ARM Cortex-A53 + 1.0 GHz quad-core ARM Cortex-A53	Mali-T860 MP2 @ 520 MHz (29.1 GFLOPS in FP32)	LPDDR3 single-channel 32-bit 667 MHz (5.3 GB/s) up to 4 GB	GSM, UMTS, GPRS, TD-SCDMA, HSPA+, HSUPA, CDMA2000; 1x/EVDO Rev. A, Cat 6 FDD/ TD-LTE w/ 20+20 CA, VoLTE	Q2 2016
MT6750N	ARMv8-A (64-bit)	28 nm (TSMC 28HPM)	1.5 GHz quad-core ARM Cortex-A53 + 1.0 GHz quad-core ARM Cortex-A53	Mali-T860 MP2 @ 520 MHz (29.1 GFLOPS in FP32)	LPDDR3 single-channel 32-bit 667 MHz (5.3 GB/s) up to 4 GB	GSM, UMTS, GPRS, TD-SCDMA, HSPA+, HSUPA, CDMA2000; 1x/EVDO Rev. A, Cat 6 FDD/ TD-LTE w/ 20+20 CA, VoLTE	Q1 2018
MT6753	ARMv8-A (64-bit)	28 nm (TSMC 28HPM)	1.5 GHz quad-core ARM Cortex-A53 + 1.3 GHz quad-core ARM Cortex-A53	Mali-T720 MP3 @ 700 MHz (42 GFLOPS in FP32)	LPDDR3 single-channel 32-bit 667 MHz (5.3 GB/s) up to 3 GB	GSM, UMTS, GPRS, TD-SCDMA, HSPA+, HSUPA, CDMA2000 1x/EVDO Rev. A, Cat 4 FDD/TD-LTE	Q3 2015
MT6750T	ARMv8-A (64-bit)	28 nm (TSMC 28HPM)	1.5 GHz quad-core ARM Cortex-A53 + 1.0 GHz quad-core ARM Cortex-A53	Mali-T860 MP2 @ 650 MHz (36.4 GFLOPS in FP32)	LPDDR3 single-channel 32-bit 833 MHz (6.6 GB/s); LPDDR3 up to 4 GB	GSM, UMTS, GPRS, TD-SCDMA, HSPA+, HSUPA, CDMA2000 1x/EVDO Rev. A, Cat 6 FDD/TD-LTE w/ 20+20 CA, VoLTE	Q2 2016
MT6750S	ARMv8-A (64-bit)	28 nm (TSMC 28HPM)	1.5 GHz quad-core ARM Cortex-A53 + 1.0 GHz quad-core ARM Cortex-A53	Mali-T860 MP2	LPDDR3 single-channel 32-bit 833 MHz (6.6 GB/s); LPDDR3 up to 4 GB	GSM, UMTS, GPRS, TD-SCDMA, HSPA+, HSUPA, CDMA2000 1x/EVDO Rev. A, Cat 6 FDD/TD-LTE w/ 20+20 CA, VoLTE	Q1 2018
MT6752M	ARMv8-A (64-bit)	28 nm (TSMC 28HPM)	1.5 GHz octa-core ARM Cortex-A53	Mali-T760 MP2 @ 700 MHz (39.2 GFLOPS in FP32)	LPDDR3 single-channel 32-bit 800 MHz (6.4 GB/s)	GSM, UMTS, GPRS, HSPA+, HSUPA, TD-SCDMA, LTE Cat 4	Q3 2014
MT6752	ARMv8-A (64-bit)	28 nm (TSMC 28HPM)	1.7 GHz octa-core ARM Cortex-A53	Mali-T760 MP2 @ 700 MHz (39.2 GFLOPS in FP32)	LPDDR3 single-channel 32-bit 800 MHz (6.4 GB/s)	GSM, UMTS, GPRS, HSPA+, HSUPA, TD-SCDMA, LTE Cat 4	Q3 2014

== Helio Series ==
=== Helio X Series (2014–2017) ===
Model number	CPU ISA	Fab	CPU (Core / Freq)	GPU	Memory technology	APU (AI Processing Unit)	Wireless radio technologies	Released
Helio X10; MT6795M/ 6795/6795T	ARM v8-A (64-bit)	28 nm (TSMC 28HPM)	4× Cortex-A53 @ 2.0/2.2 GHz; 4× Cortex-A53 @ 1.2 GHz	PowerVR G6200 @ 550/700 MHz (70.4/89.6 GFLOPS in FP32)	LPDDR3 dual-channel 32-bit (64-bit); 933 MHz (14.9 GB/s)	—N/a	UMTS, HSPA+, HSUPA, GSM, GPRS, TD-SCDMA; LTE Cat 4	Q4 2014
Helio X20; MT6797	ARM v8-A (64-bit)	20 nm (TSMC 20SoC)	2× Cortex-A72 @ 2.1 GHz; 4× Cortex-A53 @ 1.85 GHz; 4× Cortex-A53 @ 1.4 GHz	Mali-T880 MP4 @ 700 MHz (117.6 GFLOPS in FP32)	LPDDR3 dual-channel 32-bit (64-bit); 800 MHz (12.8 GB/s)	—N/a	UMTS, HSPA+, HSUPA, GSM, GPRS, TD-SCDMA, CDMA2000 1x/EVDO Rev. A Cat 6 FDD/TD-LTE (20+20CA)	Q4 2015
Helio X23; MT6797D	ARM v8-A (64-bit)	20 nm (TSMC 20SoC)	2× Cortex-A72 @ 2.3 GHz; 4× Cortex-A53 @ 1.85 GHz; 4× Cortex-A53 @ 1.4 GHz	Mali-T880 MP4 @ 800 MHz (134.4 GFLOPS in FP32)	LPDDR3 dual-channel 32-bit (64-bit); 800 MHz (12.8 GB/s)	—N/a	UMTS, HSPA+, HSUPA, GSM, GPRS, TD-SCDMA, CDMA2000 1x/EVDO Rev. A Cat 6 FDD/TD-LTE (20+20CA)	Q1 2017
Helio X25; MT6797T	ARM v8-A (64-bit)	20 nm (TSMC 20SoC)	2× Cortex-A72 @ 2.5 GHz; 4× Cortex-A53 @ 2 GHz; 4 × Cortex-A53 @ 1.55 GHz	Mali-T880 MP4 @ 800 MHz (134.4 GFLOPS in FP32)	LPDDR3 dual-channel 32-bit (64-bit); 800 MHz (12.8 GB/s)	—N/a	UMTS, HSPA+, HSUPA, GSM, GPRS, TD-SCDMA, CDMA2000 1x/EVDO Rev. A Cat 6 FDD/TD-LTE (20+20CA)	Q4 2015
Helio X27; MT6797X	ARM v8-A (64-bit)	20 nm (TSMC 20SoC)	2× Cortex-A72 @ 2.6 GHz; 4× Cortex-A53 @ 2 GHz; 4× Cortex-A53 @ 1.6 GHz	Mali-T880 MP4 @ 875 MHz (147.0 GFLOPS in FP32)	LPDDR3 dual-channel 32-bit (64-bit); 800 MHz (12.8 GB/s)	—N/a	UMTS, HSPA+, HSUPA, GSM, GPRS, TD-SCDMA, CDMA2000 1x/EVDO Rev. A Cat 6 FDD/TD-LTE (20+20CA)	Q1 2017
Helio X30; MT6799	ARM v8-A (64-bit)	10 nm (TSMC 10FF)	2× Cortex-A73 @ 2.6 GHz; 4× Cortex-A53 @ 2.2 GHz; 4× Cortex-A35 @ 1.9 GHz	PowerVR 7XTP-MT4 @ 850 MHz (217.6 GFLOPS in FP32)	LPDDR4X quad-channel 16-bit (64-bit); 1866 MHz (29.9 GB/s)	Cadence; Tensilica; P5 DSP	FDD-LTE, TD-LTE, WCDMA, TD-SCDMA, CDMA, GSM; Cat 10 (DL = 450 Mbit/s, 3× 20 MHz CA, 64-QAM) (UL = 150 Mbit/s, 2× 20 MHz CA, 64-QAM)	Q2 2017

=== Helio A Series (2018–2020) ===
Model number	CPU ISA	Fab	CPU (Core/Freq)	GPU	Memory technology	Wireless radio technologies	Released
Helio A20; MT6761V/WE	ARMv8-A (64-bit)	12 nm (TSMC 12FFC)	4× Cortex-A53 @ 1.8 GHz	PowerVR GE8300 @ 550 MHz (17.6 GFLOPS in FP32)	LPDDR3 single-channel 32-bit 800 MHz (12.8 GB/s); LPDDR4 dual-channel 16-bit (32-bit); 1200 MHz (9.6 GB/s)	UMTS, HSPA+, HSUPA, GSM, GPRS, TD-SCDMA, LTE Cat 6, CDMA2000 1x/EVDO Rev. A (SRLTE)	Q1 2020
Helio A22; MT6761V/WAB; MT6761V/WBB	ARMv8-A (64-bit)	12 nm (TSMC 12FFC)	4× Cortex-A53 @ 2.0 GHz	PowerVR GE8300 @ 660 MHz (21.1 GFLOPS in FP32)	LPDDR3 single-channel 32-bit 933 MHz (13.9 GB/s); LPDDR4X dual-channel 16-bit (32-bit); 1600 MHz (12.8 GB/s)	UMTS, HSPA+, HSUPA, GSM, GPRS, TD-SCDMA, LTE Cat 7 (DL) & Cat 13 (UL), CDMA2000 1x/ EVDO Rev. A (SRLTE)	Q2 2018
Helio A25; MT6762V/WB; MT6762V/WD	ARMv8-A (64-bit)	12 nm (TSMC 12FFC)	4× Cortex-A53 @ 1.8 GHz + 4× Cortex-A53 @ 1.5 GHz	PowerVR GE8320 @ 600 MHz (38.4 GFLOPS in FP32)	LPDDR3 single-channel 32-bit 933 MHz (13.9 GB/s); LPDDR4 dual-channel 16-bit (32-bit); 1200 MHz (9.6 GB/s); LPDDR4X dual-channel 16-bit (32-bit); 1600 MHz (12.8 GB/s)	UMTS, HSPA+, HSUPA, GSM, GPRS, TD-SCDMA, LTE Cat 4, CDMA2000 1x/EVDO Rev. A (SRLTE)	Q4 2019

=== Helio P Series (2015–2020) ===
Model number	CPU ISA	Fab	CPU (Core/Freq)	GPU	Memory technology	APU (AI Processing Unit)	Wireless radio technologies	Released date
Helio P10; MT6755; MT6755M	ARMv8-A (64-bit)	28 nm (TSMC 28HPC+)	4× Cortex-A53 @ 2.0/1.8 GHz; 4× Cortex-A53 @ 1.2/1.0 GHz	Mali-T860 MP2 @ 700 MHz (39.2 GFLOPS in FP32)	LPDDR3 single-channel 32-bit 933 MHz (7.4 GB/s)	—N/a	GSM, UMTS, GPRS, HSPA+, HSUPA, TD-SCDMA, CDMA2000 1x/EVDO Rev. A, Cat 6 FDD and TD-LTE w/ 20+20 CA	Q4 2015
Helio P15; MT6755T	ARMv8-A (64-bit)	28 nm (TSMC 28HPC+)	4× Cortex-A53 @ 2.2 GHz; 4× Cortex-A53 @ 1.2 GHz	Mali-T860 MP2 @ 700 MHz (39.2 GFLOPS in FP32)	LPDDR3 single-channel 32-bit 933 MHz (7.4 GB/s)	—N/a	GSM, UMTS, GPRS, HSPA+, HSUPA, TD-SCDMA, CDMA2000 1x/EVDO Rev. A, Cat 6 FDD and TD-LTE w/ 20+20 CA	Q3 2016
Helio P18; MT6755S	ARMv8-A (64-bit)	28 nm (TSMC 28HPC+)	4× Cortex-A53 @ 2.0 GHz; 4× Cortex-A53 @ 1.4 GHz	Mali-T860 MP2 @ 800 MHz (44.8 GFLOPS in FP32)	LPDDR3 single-channel 32-bit 933 MHz (7.4 GB/s)	—N/a	GSM, UMTS, GPRS, HSPA+, HSUPA, TD-SCDMA, CDMA2000 1x/EVDO Rev. A, Cat 6 FDD and TD-LTE w/ 20+20 CA	Q1 2018
Helio P20; MT6757	ARMv8-A (64-bit)	16 nm (TSMC 16FF+)	4× Cortex-A53 @ 2.3 GHz; 4× Cortex-A53 @ 1.6 GHz	Mali-T880 MP2 @ 900 MHz (50.4 GFLOPS in FP32)	LPDDR4X dual-channel 16-bit (32-bit); 1600 MHz (12.8 GB/s)	—N/a	GSM, UMTS, GPRS, HSPA+, HSUPA, TD-SCDMA, CDMA2000 1x/EVDO Rev. A, Cat 6 FDD and TD-LTE w/ 20+20 CA	Q3 2016
Helio P25 / P25T; MT6757CD; MT6757T	ARMv8-A (64-bit)	16 nm (TSMC 16FF+)	4× Cortex-A53 @ 2.4/2.6 GHz; 4× Cortex-A53 @ 1.65/1.7 GHz	Mali-T880 MP2 @ 1.0 GHz (56.0 GFLOPS in FP32)	LPDDR4X dual-channel 16-bit (32-bit); 1600 MHz (12.8 GB/s)	—N/a	GSM, UMTS, GPRS, HSPA+, HSUPA, TD-SCDMA, CDMA2000 1x/EVDO Rev. A, Cat 6 FDD and TD-LTE w/ 20+20 CA	Q2 2017
Helio P22; MT6762	ARMv8-A (64-bit)	12 nm (TSMC 12FFC)	4× Cortex-A53 @ 2.0 GHz; 4× Cortex-A53 @ 1.5 GHz	PowerVR GE8320 @ 650 MHz (41.6 GFLOPS in FP32)	LPDDR3 single-channel 32-bit 933 MHz (7.4 GB/s); LPDDR4X dual-channel 16-bit (32-bit); 1600 MHz (12.8 GB/s)	—N/a	GSM, UMTS, GPRS, HSPA+, HSUPA, TD-SCDMA, CDMA2000 1x/EVDO Rev. A, Cat 7 FDD and TD-LTE w/ 20+20 CA, Dual 4G LTE DSDS with Dual VoLTE/ViLTE	Q2 2018
Helio P23 / P23T; MT6763; MT6763T	ARMv8-A (64-bit)	16 nm (TSMC 16FF+)	4× Cortex-A53 @ 2.3/2.5 GHz; 4× Cortex-A53 @ 1.65 GHz	Mali-G71 MP2 @ 770 MHz (37 GFLOPS in FP32)	LPDDR4X dual-channel 16-bit (32-bit); 1600 MHz (12.8 GB/s)	—N/a	GSM, UMTS, GPRS, HSPA+, HSUPA, TD-SCDMA, CDMA2000 1x/EVDO Rev. A, Cat 7 FDD and TD-LTE w/ 20+20 CA, Dual 4G LTE DSDS with Dual VoLTE/ViLTE	Q3 2017
Helio P30; MT6758	ARMv8-A (64-bit)	16 nm (TSMC 16FF+)	4× Cortex-A53 @ 2.3 GHz; 4× Cortex-A53 @ 1.65 GHz	Mali-G71 MP2 @ 950 MHz (45.6 GFLOPS in FP32)	LPDDR4X dual-channel 16-bit (32-bit); 1600 MHz (12.8 GB/s)	Cadence Tensilica Vision P5 DSP @ 500 MHz	GSM, UMTS, GPRS, HSPA+, HSUPA, TD-SCDMA, CDMA2000 1x/EVDO Rev. A, Cat 6 FDD and TD-LTE w/ 20+20 CA	Q3 2017
Helio P35; MT6765	ARMv8-A (64-bit)	12 nm (TSMC 12FFC)	4× Cortex-A53 @ 2.3 GHz; 4× Cortex-A53 @ 1.8 GHz	PowerVR GE8320 @ 680 MHz (43.5 GFLOPS in FP32)	LPDDR4X dual-channel 16-bit (32-bit); 1600 MHz (12.8 GB/s)	Cadence Tensilica Vision P5 DSP @ 500 MHz		Q4 2018
Helio P60; MT6771	ARMv8-A (64-bit)	12 nm (TSMC 12FFC)	4× Cortex-A73 @ 2.0 GHz; 4× Cortex-A53 @ 2 GHz	Mali-G72 MP3 @ 800 MHz (57.6 GFLOPS in FP32)	LPDDR4X dual-channel 16-bit (32-bit); 1800 MHz (14.4 GB/s)	2× Cadence Tensilica Vision P6 DSP @ 525 MHz (2x 140 GMACs)	GSM, UMTS, GPRS, HSPA+, HSUPA, TD-SCDMA, CDMA2000 1x/EVDO Rev. A, Cat-7 (DL) / Cat-13 (UL); Dual 4G VoLTE; TAS 2.0; Global IMS	Q1 2018
Helio P65; MT6768	ARMv8-A (64-bit)	12 nm (TSMC 12FFC)	2× Cortex-A75 @ 2.0 GHz; 6× Cortex-A55 @ 1.7 GHz	Mali-G52 MC2 @ 820 MHz (78.7 GFLOPS in FP32)	LPDDR4X dual-channel 16-bit (32-bit); 1866 MHz (14.9 GB/s)	2× Cadence Tensilica Vision P6 DSP @ 525 MHz (2x 140 GMACs)		Q3 2019
Helio P70; MT6771V/CT; MT6771V/WT	ARMv8-A (64-bit)	12 nm (TSMC 12FFC)	4× Cortex-A73 @ 2.1 GHz; 4× Cortex-A53 @ 2.0 GHz	Mali-G72 MP3 @ 900 MHz (64.8 GFLOPS in FP32)	LPDDR4X dual-channel 16-bit (32-bit); 1800 MHz (14.4 GB/s)	2× Cadence Tensilica Vision P6 DSP @ 525 MHz (2x 140 GMACs)	GSM, UMTS, GPRS, HSPA+, HSUPA, TD-SCDMA, CDMA2000 1x/EVDO Rev. A, Cat-7 (DL)/Cat-13 (UL); Dual 4G VoLTE; TAS 2.0; Global IMS	Q4 2018
Helio P90; MT6779V/CU	ARMv8.2-A (64-bit)	12 nm (TSMC 12FFC)	2× Cortex-A75 @ 2.2 GHz; 6× Cortex-A55 @ 2.0 GHz	PowerVR GM9446 @ 970 MHz (124.1 GFLOPS in FP32)	LPDDR4X dual-channel 16-bit (32-bit); 1866 MHz (14.9 GB/s)	2× Cadence Tensilica Vision R6 DSP @ 624 MHz (2x 140 GMACs) APU 2.0 (1127 GMACs)	GSM, UMTS, GPRS, HSPA+, HSUPA, TD-SCDMA, CDMA2000 1x/EVDO Rev. A, Cat-12 (DL) / Cat-13 (UL); Dual 4G VoLTE; TAS 2.0; Global IMS; Bluetooth 5.0, 4x4 MIMO	Q1 2019
Helio P95; MT6779V/CV	ARMv8.2-A (64-bit)	12 nm (TSMC 12FFC)	2× Cortex-A75 @ 2.2 GHz; 6× Cortex-A55 @ 2.0 GHz	PowerVR GM9446 @ 970 MHz (124.1 GFLOPS in FP32)	LPDDR4X dual-channel 16-bit (32-bit); 1866 MHz (14.9 GB/s)	2× Cadence Tensilica Vision R6 DSP @ 624 MHz (2x 140 GMACs) APU 2.0 (1127 GMACs)	GSM, UMTS, GPRS, HSPA+, HSUPA, TD-SCDMA, CDMA2000 1x/EVDO Rev. A, Cat-12 (DL) / Cat-13 (UL); Dual 4G VoLTE; TAS 2.0; Global IMS; Bluetooth 5.0, 4x4 MIMO	Q2 2020

=== Helio G Series (2019–present) ===
Model number	CPU ISA	Fab	CPU (Core/Freq)	GPU	Memory technology	APU (AI Processing Unit)	ISP	Wireless radio technologies	Released
Helio G25; MT6762G	ARMv8-A (64-bit)	12 nm (TSMC; 12FFC)	4× Cortex-A53 @ 2.0 GHz; 4× Cortex-A53 @ 1.5 GHz	PowerVR GE8320 @ 650 MHz (41.6 GFLOPS in FP32)	LPDDR3 single-channel 32-bit 933 MHz (7.4 GB/s); LPDDR4X dual-channel 16-bit (32-bit); 1600 MHz (12.8 GB/s)	Unknown	21 MP Single Camera at 30 fps 13 MP+8 MP Dual Camera at 30 fps	GSM, UMTS, GPRS, HSPA+, HSUPA, TD-SCDMA, CDMA2000 1x/EVDO Rev. A LTE Cat-4, Cat-7 (DL) / Cat-13 (UL); Dual 4G VoLTE; TAS 2.0; Global IMS; Bluetooth 5.0	Q2 2020
Helio G35; MT6765G; MT6765V/CB	ARMv8-A (64-bit)	12 nm (TSMC; 12FFC)	4× Cortex-A53 @ 2.3 GHz; 4× Cortex-A53 @ 1.8 GHz	PowerVR GE8320 @ 680 MHz (43.5 GFLOPS in FP32)	LPDDR3 single-channel 32-bit 933 MHz (7.4 GB/s); LPDDR4X dual-channel 16-bit (32-bit); 1600 MHz (12.8 GB/s)	Unknown	25 MP Single Camera at 30 fps 13 MP+13 MP Dual Camera at 30 fps	GSM, UMTS, GPRS, HSPA+, HSUPA, TD-SCDMA, CDMA2000 1x/EVDO Rev. A LTE Cat-4, Cat-7 (DL) / Cat-13 (UL); Dual 4G VoLTE; TAS 2.0; Global IMS; Bluetooth 5.0	Q2 2020
Helio G36; MT6765V/XAA; MT6765V/XBA	ARMv8-A (64-bit)	12 nm (TSMC; 12FFC)	4× Cortex-A53 @ 2.2 GHz; 4× Cortex-A53 @ 1.6 GHz	PowerVR GE8320 @ 680 MHz (43.5 GFLOPS in FP32)	LPDDR3 single-channel 32-bit 933 MHz (7.4 GB/s); LPDDR4X dual-channel 16-bit (32-bit); 1600 MHz (12.8 GB/s)	Unknown	50 MP Single Camera at 15 fps 25 MP Single Camera at 30 fps 13 MP+13 MP Dual Camera at 30 fps	GSM, UMTS, GPRS, HSPA+, HSUPA, TD-SCDMA, CDMA2000 1x/EVDO Rev. A LTE Cat-4, Cat-7 (DL) / Cat-13 (UL); Dual 4G VoLTE; TAS 2.0; Global IMS; Bluetooth 5.0	Q1 2023
Helio G37; MT6765H	ARMv8-A (64-bit)	12 nm (TSMC; 12FFC)	4× Cortex-A53 @ 2.3 GHz; 4× Cortex-A53 @ 1.8 GHz	PowerVR GE8320 @ 680 MHz (43.5 GFLOPS in FP32)	LPDDR3 single-channel 32-bit 933 MHz (7.4 GB/s); LPDDR4X dual-channel 16-bit (32-bit); 1600 MHz (12.8 GB/s)	Unknown	50 MP Single Camera at 15 fps 25 MP Single Camera at 30 fps 13 MP+13 MP Dual Camera at 30 fps	GSM, UMTS, GPRS, HSPA+, HSUPA, TD-SCDMA, CDMA2000 1x/EVDO Rev. A LTE Cat-4, Cat-7 (DL) / Cat-13 (UL); Dual 4G VoLTE; TAS 2.0; Global IMS; Bluetooth 5.0	Q4 2021
Helio G50; MT6765V	ARMv8-A (64-bit)	12 nm (TSMC; 12FFC)	4× Cortex-A53 @ 2.2 GHz; 4× Cortex-A53 @ 1.7 GHz	PowerVR GE8320 @ 680 MHz (43.5 GFLOPS in FP32)	LPDDR3 single-channel 32-bit 933 MHz (7.4 GB/s); LPDDR4X dual-channel 16-bit (32-bit); 1600 MHz (12.8 GB/s)	Unknown	50 MP Single Camera at 15 fps 25 MP Single Camera at 30 fps 13 MP+13 MP Dual Camera at 30 fps	GSM, UMTS, GPRS, HSPA+, HSUPA, TD-SCDMA, CDMA2000 1x/EVDO Rev. A LTE Cat-4, Cat-7 (DL) / Cat-13 (UL); Dual 4G VoLTE; TAS 2.0; Global IMS; Bluetooth 5.0	Q4 2024
Helio G70; MT6769V/CB	ARMv8.2-A (64-bit)	12 nm (TSMC; 12FFC)	2× Cortex-A75 @ 2.0 GHz; 6x Cortex-A55 @ 1.7 GHz	Mali G52 MC2 @ 820 MHz (78.7 GFLOPS in FP32)	LPDDR4X dual-channel 16-bit (32-bit); 1800 MHz (14.4 GB/s)	Unknown	48 MP Single Camera; 25 MP Single Camera at 30 fps 16 MP+16 MP Dual Camera at 30 fps	GSM, UMTS, GPRS, HSPA+, HSUPA, TD-SCDMA, CDMA2000 1x/EVDO Rev. A LTE Cat-7 (DL) / Cat-13 (UL); Dual 4G VoLTE; TAS 2.0; Global IMS; Bluetooth 5.0	Q1 2020
Helio G80; MT6769T; MT6769V/CT; MT6769V/CU	ARMv8.2-A (64-bit)	12 nm (TSMC; 12FFC)	2× Cortex-A75 @ 2.0 GHz; 6x Cortex-A55 @ 1.8 GHz	Mali-G52 MC2 @ 950 MHz (91.2 GFLOPS in FP32)	LPDDR4X dual-channel 16-bit (32-bit); 1800 MHz (14.4 GB/s)	Unknown	48 MP Single Camera; 25 MP Single Camera at 30 fps 16 MP+16 MP Dual Camera at 30 fps	GSM, UMTS, GPRS, HSPA+, HSUPA, TD-SCDMA, CDMA2000 1x/EVDO Rev. A LTE Cat-7 (DL) / Cat-13 (UL); Dual 4G VoLTE; TAS 2.0; Global IMS; Bluetooth 5.0	Q1 2020
Helio G81; MT6769J; MT6769L; MT6769S	ARMv8.2-A (64-bit)	12 nm (TSMC; 12FFC)	2× Cortex-A75 @ 2.0 GHz; 6x Cortex-A55 @ 1.7 GHz	Mali G52 MC2 @ 820 MHz (78.7 GFLOPS in FP32)	LPDDR4X dual-channel 16-bit (32-bit); 1800 MHz (14.4 GB/s)	Unknown	48 MP Single Camera; 25 MP Single Camera at 30 fps 16 MP+16 MP Dual Camera at 30 fps	GSM, UMTS, GPRS, HSPA+, HSUPA, TD-SCDMA, CDMA2000 1x/EVDO Rev. A LTE Cat-7 (DL) / Cat-13 (UL); Dual 4G VoLTE; TAS 2.0; Global IMS; Bluetooth 5.0	Q3 2024
Helio G85; MT6769Z; MT6769V/CZ	ARMv8.2-A (64-bit)	12 nm (TSMC; 12FFC)	2× Cortex-A75 @ 2.0 GHz; 6x Cortex-A55 @ 1.8 GHz	Mali-G52 MC2 @ 1.0 GHz (96 GFLOPS in FP32)	LPDDR4X dual-channel 16-bit (32-bit); 1800 MHz (14.4 GB/s)	Unknown	48 MP Single Camera; 25 MP Single Camera at 30 fps 16 MP+16 MP Dual Camera at 30 fps	GSM, UMTS, GPRS, HSPA+, HSUPA, TD-SCDMA, CDMA2000 1x/EVDO Rev. A LTE Cat-7 (DL) / Cat-13 (UL); Dual 4G VoLTE; TAS 2.0; Global IMS; Bluetooth 5.0	Q2 2020
Helio G88; MT6769H	ARMv8.2-A (64-bit)	12 nm (TSMC; 12FFC)	2× Cortex-A75 @ 2.0 GHz; 6x Cortex-A55 @ 1.8 GHz	Mali-G52 MC2 @ 1.0 GHz (96 GFLOPS in FP32)	LPDDR4X dual-channel 16-bit (32-bit); 1800 MHz (14.4 GB/s)	Unknown	64 MP Single Camera; 16 MP+16 MP Dual Camera at 30 fps	GSM, UMTS, GPRS, HSPA+, HSUPA, TD-SCDMA, CDMA2000 1x/EVDO Rev. A LTE Cat-7 (DL) / Cat-13 (UL); Dual 4G VoLTE; TAS 2.0; Global IMS; Bluetooth 5.0	Q3 2021
Helio G91; MT6769G; MT6769K	ARMv8.2-A (64-bit)	12 nm (TSMC; 12FFC)	2× Cortex-A75 @ 2.0 GHz; 6x Cortex-A55 @ 1.8 GHz	Mali-G52 MC2 @ 1.0 GHz (96 GFLOPS in FP32)	LPDDR4X dual-channel 16-bit (32-bit); 1800 MHz (14.4 GB/s)	Unknown	108 MP Single Camera; 16 MP+16 MP Dual Camera at 30 fps	GSM, UMTS, GPRS, HSPA+, HSUPA, TD-SCDMA, CDMA2000 1x/EVDO Rev. A LTE Cat-7 (DL) / Cat-13 (UL); Dual 4G VoLTE; TAS 2.0; Global IMS; Bluetooth 5.0	Q1 2024
Helio G92; MT6769I	ARMv8.2-A (64-bit)	12 nm (TSMC; 12FFC)	2× Cortex-A75 @ 2.0 GHz; 6x Cortex-A55 @ 1.8 GHz	Mali-G52 MC2 @ 1.0 GHz (96 GFLOPS in FP32)	LPDDR4X dual-channel 16-bit (32-bit); 1800 MHz (14.4 GB/s)	Unknown	64 MP Single Camera; 16 MP+16 MP Dual Camera at 30 fps	GSM, UMTS, GPRS, HSPA+, HSUPA, TD-SCDMA, CDMA2000 1x/EVDO Rev. A LTE Cat-7 (DL) / Cat-13 (UL); Dual 4G VoLTE; TAS 2.0; Global IMS; Bluetooth 5.0	Q4 2024
Helio G90; MT6785; MT6785V	ARMv8.2-A (64-bit)	12 nm (TSMC; 12FFC)	2× Cortex-A76 @ 2.05 GHz; 6× Cortex-A55 @ 2.0 GHz	Mali-G76 MC4 @ 720 MHz (138.2 GFLOPS in FP32)	LPDDR4X dual-channel 16-bit (32-bit); 2133 MHz (17.0 GB/s)	2× APU (1 TOPS)	48 MP Single Camera at 30 fps 24 MP+16 MP Dual Camera at 30 fps	GSM, UMTS, GPRS, HSPA+, HSUPA, TD-SCDMA, CDMA2000 1x/EVDO Rev. A LTE Cat-12 (DL) / Cat-13 (UL); Dual 4G VoLTE; TAS 2.0; Global IMS; Bluetooth 5.0, 4x4 MIMO	Q3 2019
Helio G90T; MT6785V/CC	ARMv8.2-A (64-bit)	12 nm (TSMC; 12FFC)	2× Cortex-A76 @ 2.05 GHz; 6× Cortex-A55 @ 2.0 GHz	Mali-G76 MC4 @ 800 MHz (153.6 GFLOPS in FP32)	LPDDR4X dual-channel 16-bit (32-bit); 2133 MHz (17.0 GB/s)	2× APU (1 TOPS)	64 MP Single Camera at 22.5 fps 48 MP Single Camera at 30 fps 24 MP+16 MP Dual Camera at 30 fps	GSM, UMTS, GPRS, HSPA+, HSUPA, TD-SCDMA, CDMA2000 1x/EVDO Rev. A LTE Cat-12 (DL) / Cat-13 (UL); Dual 4G VoLTE; TAS 2.0; Global IMS; Bluetooth 5.0, 4x4 MIMO	Q3 2019
Helio G95; MT6785V/CD	ARMv8.2-A (64-bit)	12 nm (TSMC; 12FFC)	2× Cortex-A76 @ 2.05 GHz; 6× Cortex-A55 @ 2.0 GHz	Mali-G76 MC4 @ 900 MHz (172.8 GFLOPS in FP32)	LPDDR4X dual-channel 16-bit (32-bit); 2133 MHz (17.0 GB/s)	2× APU (1 TOPS)	64 MP Single Camera at 22.5 fps 48 MP Single Camera at 30 fps 24 MP+16 MP Dual Camera at 30 fps	GSM, UMTS, GPRS, HSPA+, HSUPA, TD-SCDMA, CDMA2000 1x/EVDO Rev. A LTE Cat-12 (DL) / Cat-13 (UL); Dual 4G VoLTE; TAS 2.0; Global IMS; Bluetooth 5.0, 4x4 MIMO	Q3 2020
Helio G96; MT6781; MT6781V/CD	ARMv8.2-A (64-bit)	12 nm (TSMC; 12FFC)	2× Cortex-A76 @ 2.05 GHz; 6× Cortex-A55 @ 2.0 GHz	Mali-G57 MC2 @ 950 MHz (121.6 GFLOPS in FP32)	LPDDR4X dual-channel 16-bit (32-bit); 2133 MHz (17.0 GB/s)	Unknown	108 MP Single Camera; 32 MP Single Camera at 30 fps with ZSL; 16 MP+16 MP Dual Camera at 30 fps with ZSL	GSM, UMTS, GPRS, HSPA+, HSUPA, TD-SCDMA, CDMA2000 1x/EVDO Rev. A LTE Cat-13; Dual 4G VoLTE; TAS 2.0; Global IMS; 4x4 MIMO, Bluetooth 5.2	Q3 2021
Helio G99; MT6789; MT6789G; MT6789U; MT6789V/CD; MT8781; MT8781V/CA; MT8781V/NA	ARMv8.2-A (64-bit)	6 nm (TSMC; N6)	2× Cortex-A76 @ 2.2 GHz; 6× Cortex-A55 @ 2.0 GHz	Mali-G57 MC2 @ 1.0 GHz (128 GFLOPS in FP32)	LPDDR4X dual-channel 16-bit (32-bit); 2133 MHz (17.0 GB/s)	Unknown	108 MP Single Camera; 32 MP Single Camera at 30 fps with ZSL; 16 MP+16 MP Dual Camera at 30 fps with ZSL	GSM, UMTS, GPRS, HSPA+, HSUPA, TD-SCDMA, CDMA2000 1x/EVDO Rev. A LTE Cat-13; Dual 4G VoLTE; TAS 2.0; Global IMS; 4x4 MIMO, Bluetooth 5.2	Q2 2022
Helio G99+	ARMv8.2-A (64-bit)	6 nm (TSMC; N6)	2× Cortex-A76 @ 2.2 GHz; 6× Cortex-A55 @ 2.0 GHz	Mali-G57 MC2 @ 1.0 GHz (128 GFLOPS in FP32)	LPDDR5X dual-channel 16-bit (32-bit); 2750 MHz (22.0 GB/s)	Unknown	108 MP Single Camera; 32 MP Single Camera at 30 fps with ZSL; 16 MP+16 MP Dual Camera at 30 fps with ZSL	GSM, UMTS, GPRS, HSPA+, HSUPA, TD-SCDMA, CDMA2000 1x/EVDO Rev. A LTE Cat-13; Dual 4G VoLTE; TAS 2.0; Global IMS; 4x4 MIMO, Bluetooth 5.2	Q3 2026
Helio G100; MT6789H; MT6789I; MT6789J	ARMv8.2-A (64-bit)	6 nm (TSMC; N6)	2× Cortex-A76 @ 2.2 GHz; 6× Cortex-A55 @ 2.0 GHz	Mali-G57 MC2 @ 1.0 GHz (128 GFLOPS in FP32)	LPDDR4X dual-channel 16-bit (32-bit); 2133 MHz (17.0 GB/s)	Unknown	200 MP Single Camera; 32 MP Single Camera at 30 fps with ZSL; 16 MP+16 MP Dual Camera at 30 fps with ZSL	GSM, UMTS, GPRS, HSPA+, HSUPA, TD-SCDMA, CDMA2000 1x/EVDO Rev. A LTE Cat-13; Dual 4G VoLTE; TAS 2.0; Global IMS; 4x4 MIMO, Bluetooth 5.2	Q3 2024
Helio G200; MT6789T	ARMv8.2-A (64-bit)	6 nm (TSMC; N6)	2× Cortex-A76 @ 2.2 GHz; 6× Cortex-A55 @ 2.0 GHz	Mali-G57 MC2 @ 1.1 GHz (140.8 GFLOPS in FP32)	LPDDR4X dual-channel 16-bit (32-bit); 2133 MHz (17.0 GB/s)	Unknown	200 MP Single Camera; 32 MP Single Camera at 30 fps with ZSL; 16 MP+16 MP Dual Camera at 30 fps with ZSL	GSM, UMTS, GPRS, HSPA+, HSUPA, TD-SCDMA, CDMA2000 1x/EVDO Rev. A LTE Cat-13; Dual 4G VoLTE; TAS 2.0; Global IMS; 4x4 MIMO, Bluetooth 5.2	Q2 2025

== Dimensity Series (2020–present) ==
=== Dimensity 700 Series ===
Model number	CPU ISA	Fab	CPU (Core/Freq)	GPU	Memory technology	ISP	Wireless radio technologies	Released
Dimensity 700 (MT6833; MT6833G; MT6833V/ZA; MT6833V/NZA)	ARMv8.2-A (64-bit)	7 nm (TSMC N7)	2× Cortex-A76 @ 2.2 GHz; 6× Cortex-A55 @ 2.0 GHz	Mali-G57 MC2 @ 950 MHz (121.6 GFLOPS in FP32)	LPDDR4X dual-channel 16-bit (32-bit); 2133 MHz (17.0 GB/s)	64 MP Single Camera; 16 MP + 16 MP Dual Camera at 30 fps	5G NR Sub-6 GHz, LTE	Q1 2021
Dimensity 720 (MT6853V/ZA; MT6853V/NZA)	ARMv8.2-A (64-bit)	7 nm (TSMC N7)	2× Cortex-A76 @ 2.0 GHz; 6× Cortex-A55 @ 2.0 GHz	Mali-G57 MC3 @ 730 MHz (140.2 GFLOPS in FP32)	LPDDR4X dual-channel 16-bit (32-bit); 2133 MHz (17.0 GB/s)	64 MP Single Camera; 20 MP + 16 MP Dual Camera at 30 fps	5G NR Sub-6 GHz, LTE	Q3 2020

=== Dimensity 800 Series ===
Model number	CPU ISA	Fab	CPU (Core/Freq)	GPU	Memory technology	APU (AI Processing Unit)	ISP	Wireless radio technologies	Released
Dimensity 800U (MT6853T; MT6853V/TNZA)	ARMv8.2-A (64-bit)	7 nm (TSMC N7)	2× Cortex-A76 @ 2.4 GHz; 6× Cortex-A55 @ 2.0 GHz	Mali-G57 MC3 @ 950 MHz (182.4 GFLOPS in FP32)	LPDDR4X dual-channel 16-bit (32-bit); 2133 MHz (17.0 GB/s)	Mediatek APU	64 MP Single Camera; 20 MP + 16 MP Dual Camera at 30 fps	5G NR Sub-6 GHz, LTE	Q3 2020
Dimensity 800 (MT6873)	ARMv8.2-A (64-bit)	7 nm (TSMC N7)	4× Cortex-A76 @ 2.0 GHz; 4× Cortex-A55 @ 2.0 GHz	Mali-G57 MC4 @ 748 MHz (191.5 GFLOPS in FP32)	LPDDR4X dual-channel 16-bit (32-bit); 2133 MHz (17.0 GB/s)	Mediatek APU 3.0 (4 cores) 2.4 TOPS	64 MP Single Camera; 32 MP + 16 MP Dual Camera at 30 fps	5G NR Sub-6 GHz, LTE	Q2 2020
Dimensity 810 (MT6833P; MT6833GP; MT6833V/PNZA)	ARMv8.2-A (64-bit)	6 nm (TSMC N6)	2× Cortex-A76 @ 2.4 GHz; 6× Cortex-A55 @ 2.0 GHz	Mali-G57 MC2 @ 1068 MHz (136.7 GFLOPS in FP32)	LPDDR4X dual-channel 16-bit (32-bit); 2133 MHz (17.0 GB/s)		64 MP Single Camera; 16 MP + 16 MP Dual Camera at 30 fps	5G NR Sub-6 GHz, LTE	Q3 2021
Dimensity 820 (MT6875)	ARMv8.2-A (64-bit)	7 nm (TSMC N7)	4× Cortex-A76 @ 2.6 GHz; 4× Cortex-A55 @ 2.0 GHz	Mali-G57 MC5 @ 900 MHz (288 GFLOPS in FP32)	LPDDR4X dual-channel 16-bit (32-bit); 2133 MHz (17.0 GB/s)	Mediatek APU 3.0 (4 cores) 2.4 TOPS	80 MP Single Camera; 32 MP + 16 MP Dual Camera at 30 fps	5G NR Sub-6 GHz, LTE	Q2 2020

=== Dimensity 900 Series ===
Model number	CPU ISA	Fab	CPU (Core/Freq)	GPU	Memory technology	APU (AI Processing Unit)	ISP	Wireless radio technologies	Released
Dimensity 900 (MT6877; MT6877V/ZA)	ARMv8.2-A (64-bit)	6 nm (TSMC N6)	2× Cortex-A78 @ 2.4 GHz; 6× Cortex-A55 @ 2.0 GHz	Mali-G68 MC4 @ 900 MHz (230.4 GFLOPS in FP32)	LPDDR4X; LPDDR5	MediaTek APU 3.0	108 MP Single Camera, 20 MP + 20 MP Dual Camera at 30 fps	5G NR Sub-6 GHz, LTE	Q2 2021
Dimensity 920 (MT6877; MT6877T; MT6877V/TZA)	ARMv8.2-A (64-bit)	6 nm (TSMC N6)	2× Cortex-A78 @ 2.5 GHz; 6× Cortex-A55 @ 2.0 GHz	Mali-G68 MC4 @ 950 MHz (243.2 GFLOPS in FP32)	LPDDR4X; LPDDR5	MediaTek APU 3.0	108 MP Single Camera, 20 MP + 20 MP Dual Camera at 30 fps	5G NR Sub-6 GHz, LTE	Q3 2021
Dimensity 930 (MT6855; MT6855G; MT6855V/AZA)	ARMv8.2-A (64-bit)	6 nm (TSMC N6)	2× Cortex-A78 @ 2.2 GHz; 6× Cortex-A55 @ 2.0 GHz	IMG BXM-8-256 @ 950 MHz (243.2 GFLOPS in FP32)	LPDDR4X; LPDDR5		108 MP Single Camera	5G NR Sub-6 GHz, LTE	Q3 2022

=== Dimensity 1000 Series ===
The MediaTek Dimensity 1100 and 1200 were announced on December 1, 2020, as the chipset company announced.

Model number	CPU ISA	Fab	CPU (Core/Freq)	GPU	Memory technology	APU (AI Processing Unit)	ISP	Wireless radio technologies	Released
Dimensity 1000C (MT6883Z/CZA)	ARMv8.2-A (64-bit)	7 nm (TSMC N7)	4× Cortex-A77 @ 2.0 GHz; 4× Cortex-A55 @ 2.0 GHz	Mali-G57 MC5 @ 654 MHz (209.3 GFLOPS in FP32)	LPDDR4X quad-channel 16-bit (64-bit); 1866 MHz (29.9 GB/s)	Mediatek APU 3.0 (4 cores) (2.4 TOPS)	Photo: 64 MP, 32 MP + 16 MP; Video: 4K HDR	5G NR Sub-6 GHz, dual-band GNSS, LTE, Wi-Fi 5 (2x2), Bluetooth 5.1	Q3 2020
Dimensity 1000L (MT6885Z/CZA)	ARMv8.2-A (64-bit)	7 nm (TSMC N7)	4× Cortex-A77 @ 2.2 GHz; 4× Cortex-A55 @ 2.0 GHz	Mali-G77 MC7 @ 695 MHz (311.4 GFLOPS in FP32)	LPDDR4X quad-channel 16-bit (64-bit); 1866 MHz (29.9 GB/s)	Mediatek APU 3.0 (2x big, 3x small and 1x tiny) (4.5 TOPS)	Photo: 80 MP, 32 MP + 16 MP; Video: 4K HDR	5G NR Sub-6 GHz, dual-band GNSS, LTE, Wi-Fi 6 (2x2), Bluetooth 5.1	Q1 2020
Dimensity 1000 (MT6889)	ARMv8.2-A (64-bit)	7 nm (TSMC N7)	4× Cortex-A77 @ 2.6 GHz; 4× Cortex-A55 @ 2.0 GHz	Mali-G77 MC9 @ 836 MHz (481.5 GFLOPS in FP32)	LPDDR4X quad-channel 16-bit (64-bit); 1866 MHz (29.9 GB/s)	Mediatek APU 3.0 (2x big, 3x small and 1x tiny) (4.5 TOPS)	Photo: 80 MP, 32 MP + 16 MP; Video: 4K HDR	5G NR Sub-6 GHz, dual-band GNSS, LTE, Wi-Fi 6 (2x2), Bluetooth 5.1	Q1 2020
Dimensity 1000+ (MT6889Z/CZA)	ARMv8.2-A (64-bit)	7 nm (TSMC N7)	4× Cortex-A77 @ 2.6 GHz; 4× Cortex-A55 @ 2.0 GHz	Mali-G77 MC9 @ 836 MHz (481.5 GFLOPS in FP32)	LPDDR4X quad-channel 16-bit (64-bit); 1866 MHz (29.9 GB/s)	Mediatek APU 3.0 (2x big, 3x small and 1x tiny) (4.5 TOPS)	Photo: 80 MP, 32 MP + 16 MP; Video: 4K HDR	5G NR Sub-6 GHz, dual-band GNSS, LTE, Wi-Fi 6 (2x2), Bluetooth 5.1	Q2 2020
Dimensity 1050 (MT6879; MT6879V/ZA; MT6879V_T/ZA)	ARMv8.2-A (64-bit)	6 nm (TSMC N6)	2× Cortex-A78 @ 2.5 GHz; 6× Cortex-A55 @ 2.0 GHz	Mali-G610 MC3 @ 1.0 GHz (384 GFLOPS in FP32)	LPDDR4X, LPDDR5	MediaTek APU 550	Photo: 108 MP, 20 MP + 20 MP; Video: 4K30 HDR	5G NR Sub-6 GHz, dual-band GNSS, 5G mmWave, LTE, Wi-Fi 6 (2x2), Bluetooth 5.2	Q3 2022
Dimensity 1080 (MT6877; MT6877V/TTZA; MT6877V_T/TTZA)	ARMv8.2-A (64-bit)	6 nm (TSMC N6)	2× Cortex-A78 @ 2.6 GHz; 6× Cortex-A55 @ 2.0 GHz	Mali-G68 MC4 @ 950 MHz (243.2 GFLOPS in FP32)	LPDDR4X, LPDDR5	MediaTek APU 3.0	Photo: 200 MP; Video: 4K30 HDR	5G NR Sub-6 GHz, dual-band GNSS, LTE, Wi-Fi 6 (2x2), Bluetooth 5.2	Q4 2022
Dimensity 1100 (MT6891; MT6891Z/CZA; MT6891Z_Z/CZA; MT6891Z_T/CZA)	ARMv8.2-A (64-bit)	6 nm (TSMC N6)	4× Cortex-A78 @ 2.6 GHz; 4× Cortex-A55 @ 2.0 GHz	Mali-G77 MC9 @ 836 MHz (481.5 GFLOPS in FP32)	LPDDR4X quad-channel 16-bit (64-bit); 2133 MHz (34.1 GB/s)	Mediatek APU 3.0 (6 cores)	Photo: 108 MP, 32 MP + 16 MP; Video: 4K HDR	5G NR Sub-6 GHz, dual-band GNSS, LTE, Wi-Fi 6 (2x2), Bluetooth 5.2	Q1 2021
Dimensity 1200 (MT6893; MT6893Z/CZA; MT6893Z_A/CZA)	ARMv8.2-A (64-bit)	6 nm (TSMC N6)	1× Cortex-A78 @ 3.0 GHz; 3× Cortex-A78 @ 2.6 GHz; 4× Cortex-A55 @ 2.0 GHz	Mali-G77 MC9 @ 886 MHz (510.3 GFLOPS in FP32)	LPDDR4X quad-channel 16-bit (64-bit); 2133 MHz (34.1 GB/s)	Mediatek APU 3.0 (6 cores) (12.5%+)	Photo: 200 MP, 32 MP + 16 MP; Video: 4K HDR	5G NR Sub-6 GHz, dual-band GNSS, LTE, Wi-Fi 6 (2x2), Bluetooth 5.2	Q1 2021
Dimensity 1300 (MT6893Z_Z/CZA; MT6893Z_T/CZA)	ARMv8.2-A (64-bit)	6 nm (TSMC N6)	1× Cortex-A78 @ 3.0 GHz; 3× Cortex-A78 @ 2.6 GHz; 4× Cortex-A55 @ 2.0 GHz	Mali-G77 MC9 @ 886 MHz (510.3 GFLOPS in FP32)	LPDDR4X quad-channel 16-bit (64-bit); 2133 MHz (34.1 GB/s)	Mediatek APU 3.0 (6 cores) (12.5%+)	Photo: 200 MP, 32 MP + 16 MP; Video: 4K HDR	5G NR Sub-6 GHz, dual-band GNSS, LTE, Wi-Fi 6 (2x2), Bluetooth 5.2	Q2 2022

=== Dimensity 6000 Series ===
Model number	CPU ISA	Fab	CPU (Core/Freq)	GPU	Memory technology	ISP	Wireless radio technologies	Released
Dimensity 6020 (Dimensity 700 renamed)	ARMv8.2-A (64-bit)	7 nm (TSMC N7)	2× Cortex-A76 @ 2.2 GHz; 6× Cortex-A55 @ 2.0 GHz	Mali-G57 MC2 @ 950 MHz (121.6 GFLOPS in FP32)	LPDDR4X dual-channel 16-bit (32-bit); 2133 MHz (17.0 GB/s)	Photo: 64 MP, 16 + 16 MP; Video: 2K30	5G NR Sub-6 GHz, 4G LTE, dual-band GNSS, Wi-Fi 5 (1x1), Bluetooth 5.1	Q1 2023
Dimensity 6080 (Dimensity 810 renamed)	ARMv8.2-A (64-bit)	6 nm (TSMC N6)	2× Cortex-A76 @ 2.4 GHz; 6× Cortex-A55 @ 2.0 GHz	Mali-G57 MC2 @ 1068 MHz (136.7 GFLOPS in FP32)	LPDDR4X dual-channel 16-bit (32-bit); 2133 MHz (17.0 GB/s)	Photo: 108 MP, 16 + 16 MP	5G NR Sub-6 GHz, 4G LTE, dual-band GNSS, Wi-Fi 5 (1x1), Bluetooth 5.1	Q1 2023
Dimensity 6100+ (MT6835; MT6835V/ZA; MT8755V/TZB)	ARMv8.2-A (64-bit)	6 nm (TSMC N6)	2× Cortex-A76 @ 2.2 GHz; 6× Cortex-A55 @ 2.0 GHz	Mali-G57 MC2 @ 962 MHz (123.1 GFLOPS in FP32)	LPDDR4X dual-channel 16-bit (32-bit); 2133 MHz (17.0 GB/s)	Photo: 108 MP, 16 + 16 MP	5G NR Sub-6 GHz, 4G LTE, dual-band GNSS, Wi-Fi 5 (1x1), Bluetooth 5.2	Q3 2023
Dimensity 6300 (MT6835; MT6835T; MT6835V/TZB)	ARMv8.2-A (64-bit)	6 nm (TSMC N6)	2× Cortex-A76 @ 2.4 GHz; 6× Cortex-A55 @ 2.0 GHz	Mali-G57 MC2 @ 1072 MHz (137.2 GFLOPS in FP32)	LPDDR4X dual-channel 16-bit (32-bit); 2133 MHz (17.0 GB/s)	Photo: 108 MP, 16 + 16 MP	5G NR Sub-6 GHz, 4G LTE, dual-band GNSS, Wi-Fi 5 (1x1), Bluetooth 5.2	Q2 2024
Dimensity 6360	ARMv8.2-A (64-bit)	6 nm (TSMC N6)	2× Cortex-A76 @ 2.4 GHz; 6× Cortex-A55 @ 2.0 GHz	Mali-G57 MC2 @ 1072 MHz (137.2 GFLOPS in FP32)	LPDDR4X dual-channel 16-bit (32-bit); 2133 MHz (17.0 GB/s)	Photo: 108 MP, 16 + 16 MP	5G NR Sub-6 GHz, 4G LTE, dual-band GNSS, Wi-Fi 5 (1x1), Bluetooth 5.2	Q2 2026
Dimensity 6400 (MT6835; MT6835V/TTZB)	ARMv8.2-A (64-bit)	6 nm (TSMC N6)	2× Cortex-A76 @ 2.5 GHz; 6× Cortex-A55 @ 2.0 GHz	Mali-G57 MC2 @ 1072 MHz (137.2 GFLOPS in FP32)	LPDDR4X dual-channel 16-bit (32-bit); 2133 MHz (17.0 GB/s)	Photo: 108 MP, 16 + 16 MP	5G NR Sub-6 GHz, 4G LTE, dual-band GNSS, Wi-Fi 5 (1x1), Bluetooth 5.2	Q1 2025
Dimensity 6500	ARMv8.2-A (64-bit)	6 nm (TSMC N6)	2× Cortex-A76 @ 2.6 GHz; 6× Cortex-A55 @ 2.0 GHz	Mali-G57 MC2 @ 1.1 GHz (140.8 GFLOPS in FP32)	LPDDR4X dual-channel 16-bit (32-bit); 2133 MHz (17.0 GB/s)	Photo: 108 MP, 16 + 16 MP	5G NR Sub-6 GHz, 4G LTE, dual-band GNSS, Wi-Fi 5 (1x1), Bluetooth 5.2	Q2 2026

=== Dimensity 7000 Series ===
Model number	CPU ISA	Fab	CPU (Core/Freq)	GPU	Memory technology	APU (AI Processing Unit)	ISP	Wireless radio technologies	Released
Dimensity 7020 (Dimensity 930 renamed)	ARMv8.2-A (64-bit)	6 nm (TSMC N6)	2× Cortex-A78 @ 2.2 GHz; 6× Cortex-A55 @ 2.0 GHz	IMG BXM-8-256 @ 950 MHz (243.2 GFLOPS in FP32)	LPDDR4X dual-channel 16-bit (32-bit); 2133 MHz (17.0 GB/s); LPDDR5 dual-channel 16-bit (32-bit); 2750 MHz (22 GB/s)		Photo: 108 MP; Video: 2K30	5G NR Sub-6 GHz, 4G LTE, dual-band GNSS (GPS, QZSS, BeiDou, Glonass, Galileo, NavIC), Wi-Fi 5 (1x1), Bluetooth 5.2	Q1 2023
Dimensity 7025 (MT6855V/ATZA; MT6855V_A/ATZA)	ARMv8.2-A (64-bit)	6 nm (TSMC N6)	2× Cortex-A78 @ 2.5 GHz; 6× Cortex-A55 @ 2.0 GHz	IMG BXM-8-256 @ 950 MHz (243.2 GFLOPS in FP32)	LPDDR4X dual-channel 16-bit (32-bit); 2133 MHz (17.0 GB/s); LPDDR5 dual-channel 16-bit (32-bit); 2750 MHz (22 GB/s)		Photo: 200 MP; Video: 2K30	5G NR Sub-6 GHz, 4G LTE, dual-band GNSS (GPS, QZSS, BeiDou, Glonass, Galileo, NavIC), Wi-Fi 5 (1x1), Bluetooth 5.2	Q2 2024
Dimensity 7030 (Dimensity 1050 renamed)	ARMv8.2-A (64-bit)	6 nm (TSMC N6)	2× Cortex-A78 @ 2.5 GHz; 6× Cortex-A55 @ 2.0 GHz	Mali-G610 MC3 @ 1.0 GHz (384 GFLOPS in FP32)	LPDDR4X dual-channel 16-bit (32-bit); 2133 MHz (17.0 GB/s); LPDDR5 dual-channel 16-bit (32-bit); 2750 MHz (22 GB/s)	MediaTek NPU 550	MediaTek Imagiq 760; Photo: 108 MP / 20 MP + 20 MP; Video: 4K30 HDR	5G NR Sub-6 GHz & mmWave, 4G LTE, dual-band GNSS (GPS, QZSS, BeiDou, Glonass, Galileo, NavIC), Wi-Fi 6E (2x2), Bluetooth 5.2	Q3 2023
Dimensity 7050 (Dimensity 1080 renamed)	ARMv8.2-A (64-bit)	6 nm (TSMC N6)	2× Cortex-A78 @ 2.6 GHz; 6× Cortex-A55 @ 2.0 GHz	Mali-G68 MC4 @ 950 MHz (243.2 GFLOPS in FP32)	LPDDR4X dual-channel 16-bit (32-bit); 2133 MHz (17.0 GB/s); LPDDR5 dual-channel 16-bit (32-bit); 2750 MHz (22 GB/s)	MediaTek NPU 550	Photo: 200 MP; Video: 4K30 HDR	5G NR Sub-6 GHz, 4G LTE, dual-band GNSS (GPS, QZSS, BeiDou, Glonass, Galileo, NavIC), Wi-Fi 6 (2x2), Bluetooth 5.2	Q2 2023
Dimensity 7060 (MT6855V/TTZA)	ARMv8.2-A (64-bit)	6 nm (TSMC N6)	2× Cortex-A78 @ 2.6 GHz; 6× Cortex-A55 @ 2.0 GHz	IMG BXM-8-256 @ 950 MHz (243.2 GFLOPS in FP32)	LPDDR4X dual-channel 16-bit (32-bit); 2133 MHz (17.0 GB/s); LPDDR5 dual-channel 16-bit (32-bit); 2750 MHz (22 GB/s)		Photo: 200 MP; Video: 2K30	5G NR Sub-6 GHz, 4G LTE, dual-band GNSS (GPS, QZSS, BeiDou, Glonass, Galileo, NavIC), Wi-Fi 5 (1x1), Bluetooth 5.2	Q2 2025
Dimensity 7100 (MT6858; MT6858V/ZA)	ARMv8.2-A (64-bit)	6 nm (TSMC N6)	4× Cortex-A78 @ 2.4 GHz; 4× Cortex-A55 @ 2.0 GHz	Mali-G610 MC2 @ 1.0 GHz (256 GFLOPS in FP32)	LPDDR4X dual-channel 16-bit (32-bit); 2133 MHz (17.0 GB/s); LPDDR5 dual-channel 16-bit (32-bit); 2750 MHz (22 GB/s)		Photo: 200 MP; Video: 2K30	5G NR Sub-6 GHz, 4G LTE, dual-band GNSS (GPS, QZSS, BeiDou, Glonass, Galileo, NavIC), Wi-Fi 6 (1x1), Bluetooth 5.4	Q4 2025
Dimensity 7200 (MT6886; MT6886V_A/CZA; MT6886V_B/CZA)	ARMv9-A (64-bit)	4 nm (TSMC N4P)	2× Cortex-A715 @ 2.8 GHz; 6× Cortex-A510 @ 2.0 GHz	Mali-G610 MC4 @ 1.13 GHz (578.6 GFLOPS in FP32)	LPDDR4X dual-channel 16-bit (32-bit); 2133 MHz (17.0 GB/s); LPDDR5 dual-channel 16-bit (32-bit); 3200 MHz (25.6 GB/s)	MediaTek NPU 650	MediaTek Imagiq 765; Photo: 200 MP; Video: 4K30 HDR	5G NR Sub-6 GHz, 4G LTE, GNSS (GPS, QZSS, BeiDou, Glonass, Galileo, NavIC), Wi-Fi 6E (2x2), Bluetooth 5.3	Q1 2023
Dimensity 7300e (MT6858T; MT6858V/TZA)	ARMv8.2-A (64-bit)	6 nm (TSMC N6)	4× Cortex-A78 @ 2.5 GHz; 4× Cortex-A55 @ 2.0 GHz	Mali-G610 MC2 @ 1.0 GHz (256 GFLOPS in FP32)	LPDDR4X dual-channel 16-bit (32-bit); 2133 MHz (17.0 GB/s); LPDDR5 dual-channel 16-bit (32-bit); 2750 MHz (22 GB/s)		Photo: 200 MP; Video: 2K30	5G NR Sub-6 GHz, 4G LTE, dual-band GNSS (GPS, QZSS, BeiDou, Glonass, Galileo, NavIC), Wi-Fi 6 (1x1), Bluetooth 5.4	Q2 2026
Dimensity 7300 (MT6878; MT6878V/ZA; MT6878V_A/ZA; MT6878V_B/ZA; MT6878V_E/ZA; MT8775)	ARMv8.2-A (64-bit)	4 nm (TSMC N4)	4× Cortex-A78 @ 2.5 GHz; 4× Cortex-A55 @ 2.0 GHz	Mali-G615 MC2 @ 1047 MHz (536.1 GFLOPS in FP32)	LPDDR4X dual-channel 16-bit (32-bit); 2133 MHz (17.0 GB/s); LPDDR5 dual-channel 16-bit (32-bit); 3200 MHz (25.6 GB/s)	MediaTek NPU 655	MediaTek Imagiq 950; Photo: 200 MP; Video: 4K30 HDR	5G NR Sub-6 GHz, 4G LTE, GNSS (GPS, QZSS, BeiDou, Glonass, Galileo, NavIC), Wi-Fi 6E (2x2), Bluetooth 5.4	Q2 2024
Dimensity 7300X (MT6878V/FZA)	ARMv8.2-A (64-bit)	4 nm (TSMC N4)	4× Cortex-A78 @ 2.5 GHz; 4× Cortex-A55 @ 2.0 GHz	Mali-G615 MC2 @ 1047 MHz (536.1 GFLOPS in FP32)	LPDDR4X dual-channel 16-bit (32-bit); 2133 MHz (17.0 GB/s); LPDDR5 dual-channel 16-bit (32-bit); 3200 MHz (25.6 GB/s)	MediaTek NPU 655	MediaTek Imagiq 950; Photo: 200 MP; Video: 4K30 HDR	5G NR Sub-6 GHz, 4G LTE, GNSS (GPS, QZSS, BeiDou, Glonass, Galileo, NavIC), Wi-Fi 6E (2x2), Bluetooth 5.4	Q2 2024
Dimensity 7360 (MT6878V_G/ZA)	ARMv8.2-A (64-bit)	4 nm (TSMC N4)	4× Cortex-A78 @ 2.5 GHz; 4× Cortex-A55 @ 2.0 GHz	Mali-G615 MC2 @ 1047 MHz (536.1 GFLOPS in FP32)	LPDDR4X dual-channel 16-bit (32-bit); 2133 MHz (17.0 GB/s); LPDDR5 dual-channel 16-bit (32-bit); 3200 MHz (25.6 GB/s)	MediaTek NPU 655	MediaTek Imagiq 950; Photo: 200 MP; Video: 4K30 HDR	5G NR Sub-6 GHz, 4G LTE, GNSS (GPS, QZSS, BeiDou, Glonass, Galileo, NavIC), Wi-Fi 6E (2x2), Bluetooth 5.4	Q3 2025
Dimensity 7350 (MT6886V/TCZA)	ARMv9-A (64-bit)	4 nm (TSMC N4P)	2× Cortex-A715 @ 3.0 GHz; 6× Cortex-A510 @ 2.0 GHz	Mali-G610 MC4 @ 1.3 GHz (665.6 GFLOPS in FP32)	LPDDR4X dual-channel 16-bit (32-bit); 2133 MHz (17.0 GB/s); LPDDR5 dual-channel 16-bit (32-bit); 3200 MHz (25.6 GB/s)	MediaTek NPU 657	MediaTek Imagiq 765; Photo: 200 MP; Video: 4K30 HDR	5G NR Sub-6 GHz, 4G LTE, GNSS (GPS, QZSS, BeiDou, Glonass, Galileo, NavIC), Wi-Fi 6E (2x2), Bluetooth 5.3	Q3 2024
Dimensity 7400 (MT6878V/TZA; MT6878V_B/TZA; MT6878V_C/TZA)	ARMv8.2-A (64-bit)	4 nm (TSMC N4)	4× Cortex-A78 @ 2.6 GHz; 4× Cortex-A55 @ 2.0 GHz	Mali-G615 MC2 @ 1.3 GHz (665.6 GFLOPS in FP32)	LPDDR4X dual-channel 16-bit (32-bit); 2133 MHz (17.0 GB/s); LPDDR5 dual-channel 16-bit (32-bit); 3200 MHz (25.6 GB/s)	MediaTek NPU 655	MediaTek Imagiq 950; Photo: 200 MP; Video: 4K30 HDR	5G NR Sub-6 GHz, 4G LTE, GNSS (GPS, QZSS, BeiDou, Glonass, Galileo, NavIC), Wi-Fi 6E (2x2), Bluetooth 5.4	Q1 2025
Dimensity 7400X (MT6878V/TFZA)	ARMv8.2-A (64-bit)	4 nm (TSMC N4)	4× Cortex-A78 @ 2.6 GHz; 4× Cortex-A55 @ 2.0 GHz	Mali-G615 MC2 @ 1.3 GHz (665.6 GFLOPS in FP32)	LPDDR4X dual-channel 16-bit (32-bit); 2133 MHz (17.0 GB/s); LPDDR5 dual-channel 16-bit (32-bit); 3200 MHz (25.6 GB/s)	MediaTek NPU 655	MediaTek Imagiq 950; Photo: 200 MP; Video: 4K30 HDR	5G NR Sub-6 GHz, 4G LTE, GNSS (GPS, QZSS, BeiDou, Glonass, Galileo, NavIC), Wi-Fi 6E (2x2), Bluetooth 5.4	Q1 2025
Dimensity 7450	ARMv8.2-A (64-bit)	4 nm (TSMC N4)	4× Cortex-A78 @ 2.6 GHz; 4× Cortex-A55 @ 2.0 GHz	Mali-G615 MC2 @ 1.3 GHz (665.6 GFLOPS in FP32)	LPDDR4X dual-channel 16-bit (32-bit); 2133 MHz (17.0 GB/s); LPDDR5 dual-channel 16-bit (32-bit); 3200 MHz (25.6 GB/s)	MediaTek NPU 655	MediaTek Imagiq 950; Photo: 200 MP; Video: 4K30 HDR	5G NR Sub-6 GHz, 4G LTE, GNSS (GPS, QZSS, BeiDou, Glonass, Galileo, NavIC), Wi-Fi 6E (2x2), Bluetooth 5.4	Q2 2026
Dimensity 7450X	ARMv8.2-A (64-bit)	4 nm (TSMC N4)	4× Cortex-A78 @ 2.6 GHz; 4× Cortex-A55 @ 2.0 GHz	Mali-G615 MC2 @ 1.3 GHz (665.6 GFLOPS in FP32)	LPDDR4X dual-channel 16-bit (32-bit); 2133 MHz (17.0 GB/s); LPDDR5 dual-channel 16-bit (32-bit); 3200 MHz (25.6 GB/s)	MediaTek NPU 655	MediaTek Imagiq 950; Photo: 200 MP; Video: 4K30 HDR	5G NR Sub-6 GHz, 4G LTE, GNSS (GPS, QZSS, BeiDou, Glonass, Galileo, NavIC), Wi-Fi 6E (2x2), Bluetooth 5.4	Q2 2026
Dimensity 7500 (MT6881)	ARMv9.3-A (64-bit)	4 nm (TSMC N4P)	4× C1-Pro @ 2.6 GHz; 4× C1-Nano @ 2.0 GHz	Mali-G625 MC2	LPDDR5 dual-channel 16-bit (32-bit); 3200 MHz (25.6 GB/s)	MediaTek NPU 850	MediaTek Imagiq 1050; Photo: 200 MP; Video: 4K30 HDR	5G NR Sub-6 GHz, 4G LTE, GNSS (GPS, QZSS, BeiDou, Glonass, Galileo, NavIC), Wi-Fi 6E (2x2), Bluetooth 5.4	Q2 2026

=== Dimensity 8000 Series ===
Model number	CPU ISA	Fab	Die size	CPU (Core/Freq)	GPU	Memory technology	APU (AI Processing Unit)	ISP	Wireless radio technologies	Released
Dimensity 8000 (MT6895; MT6895Z/CZA)	ARMv8.2-A (64-bit)	5 nm (TSMC N5)		4× Cortex-A78 @ 2.75 GHz; 4× Cortex-A55 @ 2.0 GHz	Mali-G610 MC6 @ 700 MHz (537.6 GFLOPS in FP32)	LPDDR5 quad-channel 16-bit (64-bit); 3200 MHz (51.2 GB/s)	MediaTek NPU 580	MediaTek Imagiq 780; Photo: 200 MP, 32 MP + 32 MP + 16 MP; Video: 4K HDR	5G NR Sub-6 GHz, 4G LTE, tri-band GNSS (GPS, QZSS, BeiDou, Glonass, Galileo, NavIC), Wi-Fi 6E (2x2), Bluetooth 5.3	Q1 2022
Dimensity 8020 (Dimensity 1100 renamed)	ARMv8.2-A (64-bit)	6 nm (TSMC N6)		4× Cortex-A78 @ 2.6 GHz; 4× Cortex-A55 @ 2.0 GHz	Mali-G77 MC9 @ 836 MHz (481.5 GFLOPS in FP32)	LPDDR4X quad-channel 16-bit (64-bit); 2133 MHz (34.1 GB/s)	MediaTek NPU 570	Photo: 108 MP, 32 MP + 16 MP; Video: 4K HDR	5G NR Sub-6 GHz, 4G LTE, dual-band GNSS (GPS, QZSS, BeiDou, Glonass, Galileo, NavIC), Wi-Fi 6 (2x2), Bluetooth 5.2	Q2 2023
Dimensity 8050 (Dimensity 1300 renamed)	ARMv8.2-A (64-bit)	6 nm (TSMC N6)		1× Cortex-A78 @ 3.0 GHz; 3× Cortex-A78 @ 2.6 GHz; 4× Cortex-A55 @ 2.0 GHz	Mali-G77 MC9 @ 886 MHz (510.3 GFLOPS in FP32)	LPDDR4X quad-channel 16-bit (64-bit); 2133 MHz (34.1 GB/s)	MediaTek NPU 570	Photo: 200 MP, 32 MP + 16 MP; Video: 4K HDR	5G NR Sub-6 GHz, 4G LTE, dual-band GNSS (GPS, QZSS, BeiDou, Glonass, Galileo, NavIC), Wi-Fi 6 (2x2), Bluetooth 5.2	Q2 2023
Dimensity 8100 (MT6895; MT6895Z/TCZA; MT6895Z_A/TCZA; MT6895Z_B/TCZA; MT6895ZB; MT8795Z/TNZA)	ARMv8.2-A (64-bit)	5 nm (TSMC N5)		4× Cortex-A78 @ 2.85 GHz; 4× Cortex-A55 @ 2.0 GHz	Mali-G610 MC6 @ 860 MHz (660.5 GFLOPS in FP32)	LPDDR5 quad-channel 16-bit (64-bit); 3200 MHz (51.2 GB/s)	MediaTek NPU 580	MediaTek Imagiq 780; Photo: 200 MP, 32 MP + 32 MP + 16 MP; Video: 4K HDR	5G NR Sub-6 GHz, 4G LTE, tri-band GNSS (GPS, QZSS, BeiDou, Glonass, Galileo, NavIC), Wi-Fi 6E (2x2), Bluetooth 5.3	Q1 2022
Dimensity 8200 (MT6896; MT6896Z/CZA; MT6896Z_B/CZA)	ARMv8.2-A (64-bit)	4 nm (TSMC N4)	84.93 mm^{2}	1× Cortex-A78 @ 3.1 GHz; 3× Cortex-A78 @ 3.0 GHz; 4× Cortex-A55 @ 2.0 GHz	Mali-G610 MC6 @ 950 MHz (729.6 GFLOPS in FP32)	LPDDR5 quad-channel 16-bit (64-bit); 3200 MHz (51.2 GB/s)	MediaTek NPU 580	MediaTek Imagiq 785; Photo: 320 MP, 32 MP + 32 MP + 32 MP; Video: 4K60 HDR	5G NR Sub-6 GHz, 4G LTE, tri-band GNSS (GPS, QZSS, BeiDou, Glonass, Galileo, NavIC), Wi-Fi 6E (2x2), Bluetooth 5.3	Q4 2022
Dimensity 8250 (MT6896Z_C/CZA)	ARMv8.2-A (64-bit)	4 nm (TSMC N4)	84.93 mm^{2}	1× Cortex-A78 @ 3.1 GHz; 3× Cortex-A78 @ 3.0 GHz; 4× Cortex-A55 @ 2.0 GHz	Mali-G610 MC6 @ 950 MHz (729.6 GFLOPS in FP32)	LPDDR5 quad-channel 16-bit (64-bit); 3200 MHz (51.2 GB/s)	MediaTek NPU 580	MediaTek Imagiq 785; Photo: 320 MP, 32 MP + 32 MP + 32 MP; Video: 4K60 HDR	5G NR Sub-6 GHz, 4G LTE, tri-band GNSS (GPS, QZSS, BeiDou, Glonass, Galileo, NavIC), Wi-Fi 6E (2x2), Bluetooth 5.3	Q2 2024
Dimensity 8300 (MT6897; MT6897Z/ZA; MT6897Z_A/ZA; MT8792Z/CA; MT8792Z/NB)	ARMv9-A (64-bit)	4 nm (TSMC N4P)		1× Cortex-A715 @ 3.35 GHz; 3× Cortex-A715 @ 3.2 GHz; 4× Cortex-A510 @ 2.2 GHz	Mali-G615 MC6 @ 1400 MHz (2150.4 GFLOPS in FP32)	LPDDR5X quad-channel 16-bit (64-bit); 4266 MHz (68.2 GB/s)	MediaTek NPU 780	MediaTek Imagiq 980; Photo: 320 MP, 32 MP + 32 MP + 32 MP; Video: 4K60 HDR	5G NR Sub-6 GHz, 4G LTE, tri-band GNSS (GPS, QZSS, BeiDou, Glonass, Galileo, NavIC), Wi-Fi 6E (2x2), Bluetooth 5.4	Q4 2023
Dimensity 8350 (MT6897; MT6897Z_B/ZA; MT6897Z_D/ZA; MT6897Z_E/ZA; MT6897Z_F/ZA; MT8792Z/NA)	ARMv9-A (64-bit)	4 nm (TSMC N4P)		1× Cortex-A715 @ 3.35 GHz; 3× Cortex-A715 @ 3.2 GHz; 4× Cortex-A510 @ 2.2 GHz	Mali-G615 MC6 @ 1400 MHz (2150.4 GFLOPS in FP32)	LPDDR5X quad-channel 16-bit (64-bit); 4266 MHz (68.2 GB/s)	MediaTek NPU 780	MediaTek Imagiq 980; Photo: 320 MP, 32 MP + 32 MP + 32 MP; Video: 4K60 HDR	5G NR Sub-6 GHz, 4G LTE, tri-band GNSS (GPS, QZSS, BeiDou, Glonass, Galileo, NavIC), Wi-Fi 6E (2x2), Bluetooth 5.4	Q4 2024
Dimensity 8400 (MT6899; MT6899Z/ZA; MT6899Z_A/ZA; MT6899Z_B/ZA; MT6899Z_C/ZA; MT6899Z_E/ZA)	ARMv9.2-A (64-bit)	4 nm (TSMC N4P)	94.15 mm^{2}	1× Cortex-A725 @ 3.25 GHz; 3× Cortex-A725 @ 3.0 GHz; 4× Cortex-A725 @ 2.1 GHz	Mali-G720 MC7 @ 1300 MHz (2329.6 GFLOPS in FP32)	LPDDR5X quad-channel 16-bit (64-bit); 4266 MHz (68.2 GB/s)	MediaTek NPU 880	MediaTek Imagiq 1080; Photo: 320 MP, 32 MP + 32 MP + 32 MP; Video: 4K60 HDR	5G NR Sub-6 GHz, 4G LTE, tri-band GNSS (GPS, QZSS, BeiDou, Glonass, Galileo, NavIC), Wi-Fi 6E (2x2), Bluetooth 5.4	Q4 2024
Dimensity 8450 (MT6899Z_D/ZA)	ARMv9.2-A (64-bit)	4 nm (TSMC N4P)	94.15 mm^{2}	1× Cortex-A725 @ 3.25 GHz; 3× Cortex-A725 @ 3.0 GHz; 4× Cortex-A725 @ 2.1 GHz	Mali-G720 MC7 @ 1300 MHz (2329.6 GFLOPS in FP32)	LPDDR5X quad-channel 16-bit (64-bit); 4266 MHz (68.2 GB/s)	MediaTek NPU 880	MediaTek Imagiq 1080; Photo: 320 MP, 32 MP + 32 MP + 32 MP; Video: 4K60 HDR	5G NR Sub-6 GHz, 4G LTE, tri-band GNSS (GPS, QZSS, BeiDou, Glonass, Galileo, NavIC), Wi-Fi 6E (2x2), Bluetooth 5.4	Q2 2025
Dimensity 8500 (MT6899; MT6899Z_A/TZA)	ARMv9.2-A (64-bit)	4 nm (TSMC N4P)	94.15 mm^{2}	1× Cortex-A725 @ 3.4 GHz; 3× Cortex-A725 @ 3.2 GHz; 4× Cortex-A725 @ 2.2 GHz	Mali-G720 MC8 @ 1508 MHz (3088.4 GFLOPS in FP32)	LPDDR5X quad-channel 16-bit (64-bit); 4800 MHz (76.8 GB/s)	MediaTek NPU 880	MediaTek Imagiq 1080; Photo: 320 MP, 32 MP + 32 MP + 32 MP; Video: 4K60 HDR	5G NR Sub-6 GHz, 4G LTE, tri-band GNSS (GPS, QZSS, BeiDou, Glonass, Galileo, NavIC), Wi-Fi 6E (2x2), Bluetooth 5.4	Q1 2026
Dimensity 8550 (MT6899; MT6899Z_T/TZA)	ARMv9.2-A (64-bit)	4 nm (TSMC N4P)	94.15 mm^{2}	1× Cortex-A725 @ 3.4 GHz; 3× Cortex-A725 @ 3.2 GHz; 4× Cortex-A725 @ 2.2 GHz	Mali-G720 MC8 @ 1508 MHz (3088.4 GFLOPS in FP32)	LPDDR5X quad-channel 16-bit (64-bit); 4800 MHz (76.8 GB/s)	MediaTek NPU 880	MediaTek Imagiq 1080; Photo: 320 MP, 32 MP + 32 MP + 32 MP; Video: 4K60 HDR	5G NR Sub-6 GHz, 4G LTE, tri-band GNSS (GPS, QZSS, BeiDou, Glonass, Galileo, NavIC), Wi-Fi 6E (2x2), Bluetooth 5.4	Q2 2026

=== Dimensity 9000 Series ===
Model number	CPU ISA	Fab	Die size	CPU (Cores/Freq)	GPU	Memory technology	APU (AI Processing Unit)	ISP	Wireless radio technologies	Released
Dimensity 9000 (MT6983; MT6983Z/CZA; MT8798; MT8798Z/CNZA)	ARMv9-A (64-bit)	4 nm (TSMC N4)	112.78 mm^{2}	1× Cortex-X2 @ 3.05 GHz; 3× Cortex-A710 @ 2.85 GHz; 4× Cortex-A510 @ 1.8 GHz	Mali-G710 MC10 @ 848 MHz (1085.4 GFLOPS in FP32)	LPDDR5 quad-channel 16-bit (64-bit); 3200 MHz (51.2 GB/s) or LPDDR5X quad-channel 16-bit (64-bit); 3750 MHz (60.0 GB/s)	MediaTek NPU 590	MediaTek Imagiq 790; Photo: 320 MP; Video: 4K HDR	5G NR Sub-6 GHz, 4G LTE, tri-band GNSS (GPS, QZSS, BeiDou, Galileo, Glonass, NavIC), Bluetooth 5.3, Wi-Fi 6E (2x2)	Q4 2021
Dimensity 9000+ (MT6983; MT6983W/CZA; MT8798; MT8798Z/TNZA)	ARMv9-A (64-bit)	4 nm (TSMC N4)	112.78 mm^{2}	1× Cortex-X2 @ 3.2 GHz; 3× Cortex-A710 @ 2.85 GHz; 4× Cortex-A510 @ 1.8 GHz	Mali-G710 MC10 @ 848 or 950 MHz (1085.4 or 1216 GFLOPS in FP32)	LPDDR5 quad-channel 16-bit (64-bit); 3200 MHz (51.2 GB/s) or LPDDR5X quad-channel 16-bit (64-bit); 3750 MHz (60.0 GB/s)	MediaTek NPU 590	MediaTek Imagiq 790; Photo: 320 MP; Video: 4K HDR	5G NR Sub-6 GHz, 4G LTE, tri-band GNSS (GPS, QZSS, BeiDou, Galileo, Glonass, NavIC), Bluetooth 5.3, Wi-Fi 6E (2x2)	Q2 2022
Dimensity 9200 (MT6985; MT6985W/CZA)	ARMv9-A (64-bit)	4 nm (TSMC N4P)	123.19 mm^{2}	1× Cortex-X3 @ 3.05 GHz; 3× Cortex-A715 @ 2.85 GHz; 4× Cortex-A510 @ 1.8 GHz	Immortalis-G715 MC11 @ 981 MHz (2762.5 GFLOPS in FP32)	LPDDR5X quad-channel 16-bit (64-bit); 4266 MHz (68.2 GB/s)	MediaTek NPU 690	MediaTek Imagiq 890; Photo: 320 MP; Video: 8K30 HDR, 4K60 HDR	5G NR Sub-6 GHz & mmWave, 4G LTE, quad-band GNSS (GPS, QZSS, BeiDou, Galileo, Glonass, NavIC), Bluetooth 5.3, Wi-Fi 7 (2x2)	Q4 2022
Dimensity 9200+ (MT6985; MT6985W/TCZA)	ARMv9-A (64-bit)	4 nm (TSMC N4P)	123.19 mm^{2}	1× Cortex-X3 @ 3.35 GHz; 3× Cortex-A715 @ 3.0 GHz; 4× Cortex-A510 @ 2.0 GHz	Immortalis-G715 MC11 @ 981 MHz or 1.15 GHz (2762.5 or 3238.4 GFLOPS in FP32)	LPDDR5X quad-channel 16-bit (64-bit); 4266 MHz (68.2 GB/s)	MediaTek NPU 690	MediaTek Imagiq 890; Photo: 320 MP; Video: 8K30 HDR, 4K60 HDR	5G NR Sub-6 GHz & mmWave, 4G LTE, quad-band GNSS (GPS, QZSS, BeiDou, Galileo, Glonass, NavIC), Bluetooth 5.3, Wi-Fi 7 (2x2)	Q2 2023
Dimensity 9300 (MT6989; MT6989W/CZA; MT8796W/CNZA)	ARMv9.2-A (64-bit)	4 nm (TSMC N4P)	140.35 mm^{2}	1× Cortex-X4 @ 3.25 GHz; 3× Cortex-X4 @ 2.85 GHz; 4× Cortex-A720 @ 2.0 GHz	Immortalis-G720 MC12 @ 1300 MHz (3993.6 GFLOPS in FP32)	LPDDR5X quad-channel 16-bit (64-bit); 4800 MHz (76.8 GB/s)	MediaTek NPU 790	MediaTek Imagiq 990; Photo: 320 MP; Video: 8K30 HDR, 4K60 HDR	5G NR Sub-6 GHz & mmWave, 4G LTE, quad-band GNSS (GPS, QZSS, BeiDou, Galileo, Glonass, NavIC), Bluetooth 5.4, Wi-Fi 7 (2x2)	Q4 2023
Dimensity 9300+ (MT6989; MT6989W/TCZA; MT8796W/TNZA)	ARMv9.2-A (64-bit)	4 nm (TSMC N4P)	140.35 mm^{2}	1× Cortex-X4 @ 3.4 GHz; 3× Cortex-X4 @ 2.85 GHz; 4× Cortex-A720 @ 2.0 GHz	Immortalis-G720 MC12 @ 1300 MHz (3993.6 GFLOPS in FP32)	LPDDR5X quad-channel 16-bit (64-bit); 4800 MHz (76.8 GB/s)	MediaTek NPU 790	MediaTek Imagiq 990; Photo: 320 MP; Video: 8K30 HDR, 4K60 HDR	5G NR Sub-6 GHz & mmWave, 4G LTE, quad-band GNSS (GPS, QZSS, BeiDou, Galileo, Glonass, NavIC), Bluetooth 5.4, Wi-Fi 7 (2x2)	Q2 2024
Dimensity 9400e (MT6989T_e)	ARMv9.2-A (64-bit)	4 nm (TSMC N4P)	140.35 mm^{2}	1× Cortex-X4 @ 3.4 GHz; 3× Cortex-X4 @ 2.85 GHz; 4× Cortex-A720 @ 2.0 GHz	Immortalis-G720 MC12 @ 1300 MHz (3993.6 GFLOPS in FP32)	LPDDR5X quad-channel 16-bit (64-bit); 4800 MHz (76.8 GB/s)	MediaTek NPU 790	MediaTek Imagiq 990; Photo: 320 MP; Video: 8K30 HDR, 4K60 HDR	5G NR Sub-6 GHz & mmWave, 4G LTE, quad-band GNSS (GPS, QZSS, BeiDou, Galileo, Glonass, NavIC), Bluetooth 6.0, Wi-Fi 7	Q2 2025
Dimensity 9400 (MT6991; MT6991Z/CZA; MT6991Z/CZB; MT6991W/CZA)	ARMv9.2-A (64-bit)	3 nm (TSMC N3E)	126.26 mm^{2}	1× Cortex-X925 @ 3.62 GHz; 3× Cortex-X4 @ 3.3 GHz; 4× Cortex-A720 @ 2.4 GHz	Immortalis-G925 MC12 @ 1612 MHz (4952.1 GFLOPS in FP32)	LPDDR5X quad-channel 16-bit (64-bit); 5333 MHz (85.3 GB/s)	MediaTek NPU 890	MediaTek Imagiq 1090; Photo: 320 MP; Video: 8K60 HDR	5G NR Sub-6 GHz, 4G LTE, quad-band GNSS (GPS, QZSS, BeiDou, Galileo, Glonass, NavIC), Bluetooth 6.0, Wi-Fi 7	Q4 2024
Dimensity 9400+ (MT6991; MT6991Z/TCZA; MT6991Z/TCZB; MT8799Z/TNZB)	ARMv9.2-A (64-bit)	3 nm (TSMC N3E)	126.26 mm^{2}	1× Cortex-X925 @ 3.73 GHz; 3× Cortex-X4 @ 3.3 GHz; 4× Cortex-A720 @ 2.4 GHz	Immortalis-G925 MC12 @ 1612 MHz (4952.1 GFLOPS in FP32)	LPDDR5X quad-channel 16-bit (64-bit); 5333 MHz (85.3 GB/s)	MediaTek NPU 890	MediaTek Imagiq 1090; Photo: 320 MP; Video: 8K60 HDR	5G NR Sub-6 GHz, 4G LTE, quad-band GNSS (GPS, QZSS, BeiDou, Galileo, Glonass, NavIC), Bluetooth 6.0, Wi-Fi 7	Q2 2025
Dimensity 9500s (MT6991Z/SCZB; MT6991Z/ECZB; MT8799Z/ECZB)	ARMv9.2-A (64-bit)	3 nm (TSMC N3E)	126.26 mm^{2}	1× Cortex-X925 @ 3.73 GHz; 3× Cortex-X4 @ 3.3 GHz; 4× Cortex-A720 @ 2.4 GHz	Immortalis-G925 MC11 @ 1612 MHz (4539.4 GFLOPS in FP32) or MC12 @ 1612 MHz (4952.1 GFLOPS in FP32)	LPDDR5X quad-channel 16-bit (64-bit); 5333 MHz (85.3 GB/s)	MediaTek NPU 890	MediaTek Imagiq; Photo: 320 MP, 108MP @30fps, 3x36MP @30fps Video: 8K60 HDR	5G NR Sub-6 GHz, 4G LTE, quad-band GNSS (GPS, QZSS, BeiDou, Galileo, Glonass, NavIC), Bluetooth 5.4, Wi-Fi 7	Q1 2026
Dimensity 9500M	ARMv9.3-A (64-bit)	3 nm (TSMC N3P)	140.57 mm^{2}	1× C1-Ultra @ 4.21 GHz; 3× C1-Premium @ 3.5 GHz; 4× C1-Pro @ 2.7 GHz	Mali G1-Ultra MC11 @ 1716 MHz (4832.3 GFLOPS in FP32)	LPDDR5X quad-channel 16-bit (64-bit); 5333 MHz (85.3 GB/s)	MediaTek NPU 990	MediaTek Imagiq 1190; Photo: 320 MP; Video: 8K60, 4K120 HDR	5G NR Sub-6 GHz, 4G LTE, quad-band GNSS (GPS, QZSS, BeiDou, Galileo, Glonass, NavIC), Bluetooth 6.0, Wi-Fi 7	Q3 2026
Dimensity 9500 (MT6993; MT6993W/CZA)	ARMv9.3-A (64-bit)	3 nm (TSMC N3P)	140.57 mm^{2}	1× C1-Ultra @ 4.21 GHz; 3× C1-Premium @ 3.5 GHz; 4× C1-Pro @ 2.7 GHz	Mali G1-Ultra MC12 @ 1716 MHz (5271.6 GFLOPS in FP32)	LPDDR5X quad-channel 16-bit (64-bit); 5333 MHz (85.3 GB/s)	MediaTek NPU 990	MediaTek Imagiq 1190; Photo: 320 MP; Video: 8K60, 4K120 HDR	5G NR Sub-6 GHz, 4G LTE, quad-band GNSS (GPS, QZSS, BeiDou, Galileo, Glonass, NavIC), Bluetooth 6.0, Wi-Fi 7	Q3 2025
Dimensity 9600M	ARMv9.3-A (64-bit)	3 nm (TSMC N3P)	140.57 mm^{2}	1× C1-Ultra @ 4.21 GHz; 3× C1-Premium @ 3.5 GHz; 4× C1-Pro @ 2.7 GHz	Mali G1-Ultra MC12 @ 1716 MHz (5271.6 GFLOPS in FP32)	LPDDR5X quad-channel 16-bit (64-bit); 5333 MHz (85.3 GB/s)	MediaTek NPU 990	MediaTek Imagiq 1190; Photo: 320 MP; Video: 8K60, 4K120 HDR	5G NR Sub-6 GHz, 4G LTE, quad-band GNSS (GPS, QZSS, BeiDou, Galileo, Glonass, NavIC), Bluetooth 6.0, Wi-Fi 7	Q3 2026
Dimensity 9600 Pro (MT6995; MT6995Z/CZB)	ARMv9.3-A (64-bit)	2 nm (TSMC N2P)	134.02 mm^{2}	2× C2-Ultra @ 4.55 GHz; 3× C2-Pro @ 4.35 GHz; 3× C2-Pro @ 3.1 GHz	Mali G2-Ultra NX MC12 @ 1800 MHz (5529.6 GFLOPS in FP32)	LPDDR5X quad-channel 16-bit (64-bit); 5333 MHz (85.3 GB/s) or LPDDR6 quad-channel 24-bit (96-bit); 5333 MHz (128.0 GB/s)	MediaTek NPU 1090	MediaTek Imagiq 1290; Photo: 200 MP; Video: 8K60, 4K120 HDR	5G NR Sub-6 GHz, 4G LTE, quad-band GNSS (GPS, QZSS, BeiDou, Galileo, Glonass, NavIC), Bluetooth 6.2, Wi-Fi 7	Q3 2026

== Genio Series (IoT) ==
=== MediaTek Genio 130/130A ===
- Genio 130 (MT7931): Cortex‑M33 MCU + Wi‑Fi 6 + BLE 5
- Genio 130A (MT7933): Cortex‑M33 MCU + Wi‑Fi 6 + BLE 5 + HiFi4 DSP

=== MediaTek AIoT i300/i500 ===
- i300A (MT8362A) • ARMv8-A • Quad-core ARM Cortex-A35 @ 1.5 GHz
- i300B (MT8362B) • ARMv8-A • Quad-core ARM Cortex-A35 @ 1.3 GHz
- i500 (MT8385) • ARMv8-A • Quad-core ARM Cortex-A73 @ 2.0 GHz +

• Genio 500 (MT8385) | + Quad-core ARM Cortex-A53 @ 2.0 GHz

=== MediaTek Genio platform ===
IoT Yocto currently supports these MediaTek Genio platform:

- Genio 350 (MT8365) • Quad-core ARM Cortex-A53 (64-bit), GPU: Mali-G52 MC1
- Genio 510 (MT8370) • 2x ARM Cortex-A78 / 4x ARM Cortex-A55, GPU: Mali-G57
- Genio 700 (MT8390) • 2x ARM Cortex-A78 / 6x ARM Cortex-A55, GPU: Mali-G57
- Genio 1200 (MT8395) • 4x ARM Cortex-A78 / 4x ARM Cortex-A55 @2.2/2.0GHz

Application Processor (8 Core, VFBGA-1046, GPU: Mali-G57, OpenGL ES 3.2 3D)

Model number	CPU ISA	Fab	CPU (Core/Freq)	GPU	Memory technology	Wireless radio technologies	Release
AIoT i300A (MT8362A)	ARMv8 (64-bit)	14 nm	4× ARM Cortex-A35 @ 1.5 GHz	IMG PowerVR; GE8300 @ ? MHz	LPDDR3/3L @ 800 MHz, DDR4 (32-bit) @ 667 MHz	Wi-Fi 5 (ac), Bluetooth 5.0	Q1 2020
AIoT i300B (MT8362B)	ARMv8 (64-bit)	14 nm	4× ARM Cortex-A35 @ 1.3 GHz	IMG PowerVR; GE8300 @ ? MHz	LPDDR3/3L @ 800 MHz, DDR4 (32-bit) @ 667 MHz	Wi-Fi 5 (ac), Bluetooth 5.0	Q1 2020
AIoT i300PA (MT8768V/WA)	ARMv8 (64-bit)	12 nm	4× ARM Cortex-A53 @ 2.0 GHz	IMG PowerVR; GE8320 @ 650 MHz	LPDDR3/3L @ 800 MHz, DDR4 (32-bit) @ 667 MHz	Wi-Fi 5 (ac), Bluetooth 5.0	Q1 2020
AIoT i300PB (MT8768V/WB)	ARMv8 (64-bit)	12 nm	4× ARM Cortex-A53 @ 2.0 GHz	IMG PowerVR; GE8320 @ 650 MHz	LPDDR3/3L @ 800 MHz, DDR4 (32-bit) @ 667 MHz	Wi-Fi 5 (ac), Bluetooth 5.0	Q1 2020
Genio 350 (MT8365)	ARMv8 (64-bit)	14 nm	4× ARM Cortex-A53 @ 2.0 GHz	Mali-G52 MC1 @ 800 MHz	LPDDR3/4; DRAM (32-bit)	Wi-Fi 5 (ac), Bluetooth 5.0	Q3 2020
Genio 500 (AIoT i500) (MT8385)	ARMv8 (64-bit)	12 nm	4× ARM Cortex-A73 @ 2.0 GHz; 4× ARM Cortex-A53 @ 2.0 GHz	Mali-G72 MP3 @ 800 MHz	LPDDR4 32-bit (2ch x 16-bit) @ 3733 Mbps	Wi-Fi 5 (ac), Bluetooth 5.0	Q3 2020
AIoT i500P (MT8788A)	ARMv8 (64-bit)	12 nm	4× ARM Cortex-A73 @ 2.0 GHz; 4× ARM Cortex-A53 @ 2.0 GHz	Mali-G72 MP3 @ 800 MHz	LPDDR4 32-bit (2ch x 16-bit) @ 3733 Mbps	Wi-Fi 5 (ac), Bluetooth 5.0	Q3 2020
Genio 510 (MT8370)	ARMv8.2 (64-bit)	6 nm	2× ARM Cortex-A78 @ 2.2 GHz; 4× ARM Cortex-A55 @ 2.0 GHz	Mali-G57 MC2 @ ? MHz	LPDDR4/4X; DRAM (64-bit)	Wi-Fi 6 (ax), Bluetooth	Q2 2024
Genio 700 (MT8390)	ARMv8.2 (64-bit)	6 nm	2× ARM Cortex-A78 @ 2.2 GHz; 6× ARM Cortex-A55 @ 2.0 GHz	Mali-G57 MC3 @ ? MHz	LPDDR4/4X; DRAM (64-bit)	Wi-Fi 6 (ax), Bluetooth	Q1 2020
Genio 1200 (MT8395; MT8395AV; MT8395AV/ZA)	ARMv8.2 (64-bit)	6 nm	4× ARM Cortex-A78 @ 2.2 GHz; 4× ARM Cortex-A55 @ 2.0 GHz	Mali-G57 MC5 @ 880 MHz	LPDDR4/4X; DRAM (64-bit)	Wi-Fi 6 (ax), Bluetooth 5.2	Q2 2022

== Kompanio Series ==
Model number	CPU ISA	Fab	CPU (Core/Freq)	GPU	Memory technology	Wireless radio technologies	Released
Kompanio 500 (MT8183V) (prev. Helio P60T)	ARMv8	12 nm	4× ARM Cortex-A73 @ 2.0 GHz; 4× ARM Cortex-A53 @ 2.0 GHz	Mali-G72 MP3 @ 800 MHz	LPDDR3; LPDDR4/4X	Wi-Fi 5 (ac), Bluetooth, FM Radio, GPS	Q4 2019
Kompanio 520 (MT8186GV)	ARMv8.2	12 nm	2× ARM Cortex-A76 @ 2.0 GHz; 6× ARM Cortex-A55 @ 2.0 GHz	Mali-G52 MC2 @ ? MHz	LPDDR4X @ 3733 MT/s	Wi-Fi 6 (ax)	Q4 2022
Kompanio 528 (MT8186TV)	ARMv8.2	12 nm	2× ARM Cortex-A76 @ 2.2 GHz; 6× ARM Cortex-A55 @ 2.0 GHz	Mali-G52 MC2 @ ? MHz	LPDDR4X @ 3733 MT/s	Wi-Fi 6 (ax)	Q4 2022
Kompanio 540	ARMv8.2	6 nm	2× ARM Cortex-A78 @ 2.6 GHz; 6× ARM Cortex-A55 @ 2.0 GHz	Mali-G57 MC2	LPDDR5 @ 6400 MT/s; LPDDR4X @ 4266 MT/s	Wi-Fi 7, Bluetooth	Q4 2025
Kompanio 800T (MT8771)	ARMv8.2	6 nm (TSMC; N6)	2× ARM Cortex-A76 @ 2.4 GHz; 6× ARM Cortex-A55 @ 2.0 GHz	Mali-G57 MC2 @ ? MHz	LPDDR4X @ 4266 MT/s	5G NR, 4G LTE, dual-band GNSS (QZSS, GPS, BeiDou, Glonass, Galileo, NavIC), Wi-Fi 5 (1x1), Bluetooth 5.1	Q1 2022
Kompanio 820 (MT8192V)	ARMv8.2	7 nm	4× ARM Cortex-A76 @ 2.2 GHz; 4× ARM Cortex-A55 @ 2.0 GHz	Mali-G57 MC5 @ ?MHz	LPDDR4X	Wi-Fi 5 (ac), Bluetooth, GPS	Q2 2021
Kompanio 828 (MT8192T)	ARMv8.2	7 nm	4× ARM Cortex-A76 @ 2.6 GHz; 4× ARM Cortex-A55 @ 2.0 GHz	Mali-G57 MC5 @ ?MHz	LPDDR4X	Wi-Fi 5 (ac), Bluetooth, GPS	Q2 2021
Kompanio 838 (MT8188GV)	ARMv8.2	6 nm	2× ARM Cortex-A78 @ 2.6 GHz; 6× ARM Cortex-A55 @ 2.0 GHz	Mali-G57 MC3 @ ? MHz	LPDDR4X @ 3733 MT/s; DDR4 @ 3200 MT/s	Wi-Fi 6E (ax)	Q3 2024
Kompanio 900T (MT8791)	ARMv8.2	6 nm	2× ARM Cortex-A78 @ 2.4 GHz; 6× ARM Cortex-A55 @ 2.0 GHz	Mali-G68 MC4 @ ? MHz	LPDDR4X; LPDDR5	Wi-Fi 6 (ax), Bluetooth 5.2, GPS	Q3 2021
Kompanio 1200 (MT8195GV)	ARMv8.2	6 nm	4× ARM Cortex-A78 @ 2.6 GHz; 4× ARM Cortex-A55 @ 2.0 GHz	Mali-G57 MC5 @ ? MHz	LPDDR4X @ 4266 MT/s	Wi-Fi 5 (ac), Bluetooth, GPS	Q1 2021
Kompanio 1300T (MT8797)	ARMv8.2	6 nm	4× ARM Cortex-A78 @ 2.6 GHz; 4× ARM Cortex-A55 @ 2.0 GHz	Mali-G77 MC9 @ ? MHz	LPDDR4X @ 4266 MT/s	Wi-Fi 6 (ax), Bluetooth, GPS	Q3 2021
Kompanio 1380 (MT8195TV)	ARMv8.2	6 nm	4× ARM Cortex-A78 @ 3.0 GHz; 4× ARM Cortex-A55 @ 2.0 GHz	Mali-G57 MC5 @ ? MHz	LPDDR4X @ 4266 MT/s	Wi-Fi 6E (ax), Bluetooth, GPS	Q1 2022

=== Kompanio Ultra series ===
Model number	CPU ISA	Fab	CPU (Core/Freq)	Cache (L2/L3/SLC)	GPU	NPU	AI performance	Memory technology	Storage	Display support	Video (decode/encode)	Wireless radio technologies	Released
Kompanio Ultra 910	ARMv9.2	3 nm (TSMC; 2nd-gen 3 nm)	1× Arm Cortex-X925 @ up to 3.62 GHz; 3× Arm Cortex-X4 @ ? GHz; 4× Arm Cortex-A720 @ ? GHz	X925: 2 MB L2; X4: 1 MB L2 (each); A720: 512 KB L2 (each); 12 MB L3; 10 MB SLC	Arm Immortalis-G925 MC11	MediaTek NPU 890	Up to 50 TOPS	LPDDR5X @ 8533 MT/s	UFS 4.0	Internal: up to 4K60; External: up to 2× 4K (DP MST)	Decode: 4K60 10-bit (HEVC/AVC/VP9/AV1); Encode: 4K60 10-bit (HEVC/AVC); 4K60 8-bit (HEVC)	Wi-Fi 7 (up to 7.3 Gbps), Bluetooth 6.0 (dual BT engine)	Q2 2025

== Standalone application and tablet processors ==
Model number	CPU ISA	Fab	CPU (Core/Freq)	CPU cache	GPU	Memory technology	Wireless radio technologies	Released
MT8317	ARMv7 (32- bit)	40 nm	1.0 GHz dual-core ARM Cortex-A9		PowerVR; SGX531 Ultra @ 522 MHz			3Q 2013
MT8317T	ARMv7 (32- bit)	40 nm	1.2 GHz dual-core ARM Cortex-A9		PowerVR; SGX531 Ultra @ 522 MHz			3Q 2013
MT8377	ARMv7 (32- bit)	40 nm	1.2 GHz dual-core ARM Cortex-A9	1 MB L2	PowerVR; SGX531 Ultra @ 522 MHz		3G, HSPA, HSPA+	3Q 2013
MT8312	ARMv7 (32- bit)	28 nm (TSMC; 28HPM)	1.3 GHz dual-core ARM Cortex-A7	256 KB L2	Mali-400 @ 500 MHz			
MT8321	ARMv7 (32- bit)	28 nm (TSMC; 28HPM)	1.3 GHz quad-core ARM Cortex-A7		Mali-400		UMTS, HSPA+ R8, TD-SCDMA, EDGE, Wi-Fi, Bluetooth, FM, GPS	2014
MT8382	ARMv7 (32- bit)	28 nm (TSMC; 28HPM)	1.3 GHz quad-core ARM Cortex-A7	256 KB L2	Mali-400 MP2 @ 500 MHz		Multi-mode; R8 HSPA+, TD-SCDMA, GPS, Wi-Fi, Bluetooth	1H 2014
MT8117	ARMv7 (32- bit)	28 nm (TSMC; 28HPM)	1.2 GHz dual-core ARM Cortex-A7		PowerVR; SGX544 @ 156 MHz			1H 2014
MT8121	ARMv7 (32- bit)	28 nm (TSMC; 28HPM)	1.3 GHz quad-core ARM Cortex-A7		PowerVR; SGX544 @ 156 MHz		Wi-Fi, GPS, Bluetooth	2H 2013
MT8125	ARMv7 (32- bit)	28 nm (TSMC; 28HPM)	1.2 GHz quad-core ARM Cortex-A7	1 MB L2	PowerVR; SGX544 @ 256 MHz	32-bit DDR3L, LPDDR2		1H 2013
MT8389	ARMv7 (32- bit)	28 nm (TSMC; 28HPM)	1.2 GHz quad-core ARM Cortex-A7	1 MB L2	PowerVR; SGX544 @ 286 MHz	32-bit DDR3L, LPDDR2	3G	1H 2013
MT8389T	ARMv7 (32- bit)	28 nm (TSMC; 28HPM)	1.5 GHz quad-core ARM Cortex-A7	1 MB L2	PowerVR; SGX544 @ 357 MHz	32-bit DDR3L, LPDDR2	3G	1H 2013
MT8135	ARMv7 (32- bit)	28 nm (TSMC; 28HPM)	1.7 GHz dual-core ARM Cortex-A15; 1.2 GHz dual-core ARM Cortex-A7		PowerVR; G6200 (2 clusters) @ 450 MHz			2013
MT8135V	ARMv7 (32- bit)	28 nm (TSMC; 28HPM)	1.5 GHz dual-core ARM Cortex-A15; 1.2 GHz dual-core ARM Cortex-A7		PowerVR; G6200 (2 clusters) @ 450 MHz	32-bit DDR3L		Q3 2014
MT8127	ARMv7 (32- bit)	28 nm (TSMC; 28HPM)	1.3 GHz quad-core ARM Cortex-A7	512 KB L2	Mali-450 MP4 @ 600 MHz	32-bit DDR3; 666 MHz (5.3 GB/s)	Wi-Fi, Bluetooth, FM, GPS	2014
MT8151	ARMv7 (32- bit)	28 nm (TSMC; 28HPM)	1.7 GHz octa-core ARM Cortex-A7		Mali-450 MP4		Wi-Fi, GPS; Bluetooth	
MT8392	ARMv7 (32- bit)	28 nm (TSMC; 28HPM)	2.0 GHz octa-core ARM Cortex-A7	32 KB L1; 1 MB L2	Mali-450 MP4 @ 700 MHz		3G	1H 2014
MT8735	ARMv8 (64- bit)	28 nm (TSMC; 28HPM)	1.3 GHz quad-core ARM Cortex-A53		Mali-T720 MP2	LPDDR3	LTE Cat 4, 4G, 3G, 2G, Dual-band; Wi-Fi, FM, Bluetooth, GPS, BeiDou, Glonass	Q2 2015
MT8732	ARMv8 (64- bit)	28 nm (TSMC; 28HPM)	1.5 GHz quad-core ARM Cortex-A53	512 KB L2	Mali-T760 MP2 @ 500 MHz	LPDDR3; 800 MHz (6.4 GB/s)	LTE Cat 4, 4G, 3G, 2G, Wi-Fi, FM, Bluetooth, GPS, BeiDou, Glonass	Q4 2014
MT8752	ARMv8 (64- bit)	28 nm (TSMC; 28HPM)	1.7 GHz octa-core ARM Cortex-A53		Mali-T760 MP2 @ 700 MHz		LTE Cat 4, 4G, 3G, 2G	Q4 2014
MT8161	ARMv8 (64- bit)	28 nm (TSMC; 28HPM)	1.3 GHz quad-core ARM Cortex-A53		Mali-T720 MP2	DDR3/3L; 800 MHz		
MT8163 (V/B)	ARMv8 (64- bit)	28 nm (TSMC; 28HPM)	1.3 GHz quad-core ARM Cortex-A53		Mali-T720 MP2 @ 520 MHz	DDR3/3L; 800 MHz	Dual-band; Wi-Fi, Bluetooth, FM, GPS	Q2 2015
MT8163 (V/A)	ARMv8 (64- bit)	28 nm (TSMC; 28HPM)	1.5 GHz quad-core ARM Cortex-A53		Mali-T720 MP2 @ 600 MHz	DDR3/3L; 800 MHz	Dual-band; Wi-Fi, GPS, Bluetooth, FM	Q2 2015
MT8165	ARMv8 (64- bit)	28 nm (TSMC; 28HPM)	1.5 GHz quad-core ARM Cortex-A53		Mali-T760 MP2	DDR3/3L; 800 MHz		Q4 2014
MT8166	ARMv8 (64- bit)	28 nm (TSMC; 28HPM)	2.0 GHz quad-core ARM Cortex-A53	1 MB	PowerVR; GE8300; Mali-T760 MP2	LPDDR4; LPDDR3, DDR3-800	Dual-band ac, Wi-Fi Direct, Bluetooth, GPS	Q2 2021
MT8167A	ARMv8 (64- bit)	28 nm (TSMC; 28HPM)	1.5 GHz quad-core ARM Cortex-A35		PowerVR; GE8300 (1 cluster)	DDR3, LPDDR3, DDR4	Dual-band ac, Wi-Fi Direct, Bluetooth, GPS	2017
MT8173	ARMv8 (64- bit)	28 nm (TSMC; 28HPM)	2.0 GHz dual-core ARM Cortex-A72; 2.0 GHz dual-core ARM Cortex-A53		PowerVR; GX6250 (2 clusters) @ 700 MHz			Q1 2015
MT8176	ARMv8 (64- bit)	28 nm (TSMC; 28HPM)	2.0 GHz dual-core ARM Cortex-A72; 1.6 GHz quad-core ARM Cortex-A53		PowerVR; GX6250 (2 clusters) @ 600 MHz	LPDDR3; 2ch 32-bit 933 MHz	Wi-Fi ac, Bluetooth, FM, GPS	Q1 2016
MT8766	ARMv8 (64- bit)	12 nm	2.0 GHz quad-core ARM Cortex-A53	1 MB	PowerVR; GE8300	LPDDR3, LPDDR4	Dual-band ac Wi-Fi, Bluetooth, GPS, GSM, GPRS, EDGE, TD-HSxPD, TD-SCDMA, LTE-TDD/FDD, Wi-Fi Direct	Q2 2020
MT8768T / P22T		12 nm	2.3 GHz quad-core ARM Cortex-A53; 1.8 GHz quad-core ARM Cortex-A53	1 MB	PowerVR; GE8320	LPDDR3, LPDDR4	Dual-band ac Wi-Fi, Bluetooth, GPS, GSM, GPRS, EDGE, TD-HSxPD, TD-SCDMA, LTE-TDD/FDD, Wi-Fi Direct	Q1 2018
MT8693			2.0 GHz dual-core ARM Cortex-A72; 1.8 GHz quad-core ARM Cortex-A53		PowerVR; GX6250	LPDDR3; 2ch DRAM	Wi-Fi, Bluetooth (by MT6630)	

== Digital television SoCs ==
=== Smart TV SoCs ===
Model number	CPU (Core/Freq)	GPU	Video decoder	Video encoder	Integrated connectivity	Segment	Released
MT5327	Dual-core; ARM Cortex-A9 @ 1.2 GHz	SGX543; MP2 @ 400 MHz	1080p@60 fps MPEG1/2/4, H.264, VC-1, 4K/2K@30 fps H.264	1080p H.264	3x HDMI 1.4a, 2.4 GHz Wi-Fi/BT, MHL, USB 3.0	Android TV, UltraHD TV	H1 2014
MT5329	Dual-core; ARM Cortex-A17 @ 1.0 GHz + Dual-core; ARM Cortex-A7 @ 700 MHz	Mali-T624; MP4	4K HEVC/VP9 @60 fps			Android TV, UltraHD TV	2014
MT5366			MPEG1/2/4, H.264, VC-1, RMVB, AVS		TCON/OD, Ethernet MAC	60 Hz cost- efficient TV	
MT5389			MPEG1/2/4, H.264, VC-1, RMVB, AVS, VP8		TCON, 3x HDMI 1.4	Basic 60 Hz; 3D TV	
MT5395			MPEG1/2/4, H.264, VC-1, RMVB, AVS	720p H.264	TCON/OD, Ethernet PHY, HDMI 1.4	Full HD 120 Hz, 3D LCD TV with ME/MC	
MT5396	Dual-core; ARM Cortex-A9 @ 900 MHz		MPEG1/2/4, H.264, VC-1, RMVB, AVS, VP8	720p H.264	TCON/OD, Ethernet PHY	Full HD 120 Hz, 3D LCD TV with ME/MC (Smart TV)	
MT5398	Dual-core; ARM Cortex-A9 @ 900 MHz		MPEG-1/2/4, H.264, VC-1, RMVB, AVS, VP8	720p H.264	TCON, HDMI 1.4	Smart 3D TV	
MT5505	Dual-core; ARM Cortex-A9 @ 900 MHz	Mali-4xx; MP2	MPEG-1/2/4, H.264, VC-1, RMVB, AVS, VP8	720p H.264	TCON, HDMI 1.4	Smart 3D TV	
MT5561	Single-core; ARM11 @ 700 MHz		MPEG-1/2/4, H.264, VC-1, RMVB, AVS, VP8		CVBS, HDMI 1.4, VGA (D-sub), YPbPr	Entry-level; Connected DTV	
MT5580	Single-core; ARM Cortex-A9 @ 800 MHz		MPEG-1/2/4, H.264, VC-1, RMVB, AVS, VP8		TCON, Ethernet; PHY + MAC, HDMI 1.4	Connected 3D TV	
MT5582	Quad-core; ARM Cortex-A53		H.265, HEVC, VP-9	1080p H.264	LVDS, HDMI 1.4, USB 2.0	Full HD; Smart TVs	
MT5592	Dual-core; ARM Cortex-A9 @ 1.0 GHz		AVS, H.264, MPEG-1/2/4, RMVB, VC-1, VP-8	4K; H.264	CVBS, HDMI, VGA (D-sub), YPbPr, Ethernet	Smart DTV	
MT5595	Dual-core; ARM Cortex-A17 + Dual-core; ARM Cortex-A7	Mali-T6xx	4K HEVC/VP9 @ 60 fps			Android TV, UltraHD	Q1 2015
MT5596	Quad-core; ARM Cortex-A53 @ 1.1 GHz	Mali-T860; MP2	H.265, HEVC, VP-9	4K; H.264, VP8	HDMI 2.0/1.4 with HDCP 2.2, Ethernet, Wi-Fi; USB 2.0, USB 3.0	Flagship 64-bit 4K UHD SmartTV	
MT5597	Quad-core; ARM Cortex-A53 @ 1.0 GHz		H.264, H.265/HEVC, MPEG-1/2/4, VP-9		HDMI 2.0/1.4 with HDCP 2.2, USB 2.0, USB 3.0	Cost-effective; Digital TVs	
MT9638	Quad-core; ARM Cortex-A55 @ 1.5 GHz	Mali-G52; 3EE MC1	AV1, AVS2, HEVC, VP9, H.264, SHVC; 4K60@10bit	4K; H.264	HDMI 2.0/1.4 with HDCP 2.2, USB 2.0, USB 3.0, HDMI 2.1	High Performance; 4K TVs	
MT9675 / MT9632 / MT9602	Quad-core; ARM Cortex-A53 @ 1.5 GHz	Mali-G52; 2EE MC1	AV1, AVS2, HEVC, VP9, H.264, SHVC; 4K60@10bit	4K; H.264	HDMI 2.0/1.4 with HDCP 2.2, HDMI 2.1a, USB 2.0, USB 3.0	High Performance; 4K TVs	
MT9685 / MT9612	Quad-core; ARM Cortex-A55 @ 1.5 GHz	Mali-G52; 2EE MC1	AV1, AVS2, HEVC, VP9, H.264, SHVC; 4K60@10bit	4K; H.264	HDMI 2.0/1.4 with HDCP 2.2, HDMI 2.1a, USB 2.0, USB 3.0	High Performance; 4K TVs	
MT9686 / MT9652 / MT9613	Quad-core; ARM Cortex-A73 @ 1.4 GHz	Mali-G52; 2EE MC1	AV1, AVS2, HEVC, VP9, H.264, SHVC; 4K60@10bit	4K; H.264	HDMI 2.0/1.4 with HDCP 2.2, HDMI 2.1a, USB 2.0, USB 3.0	Premium 4K TV	
MT9950 / MT5895 (S900) / MT9970A	Quad-core; ARM Cortex-A73 @ 1.8 GHz	Mali-G52; 2EE MC2 @ 800 MHz	HEVC: 8K@60 Hz, VP9: 8K@30 Hz, H.264: 8K@30 Hz, AV1: 8K@30 Hz, AVS2: 4K@60 Hz		HDMI 2.0/1.4 with HDCP 2.2, HDMI 2.1a, USB 2.0, USB 3.0	Flagship 8K TV	Q3 2019

=== Pentonic Series ===
Model number	CPU (Core / Freq)	GPU	Memory technology	Video decoder	HDR formats	AI capabilities (MediaTek DLA)	Integrated connectivity	Segment	Released
Pentonic 2000 (MT9902; MT9982)	Quad-core; ARM Cortex-A76 @ 1.8 GHz	Mali-G57; MC3 @ 1.0 GHz	96-bit LPDDR4X @ 2166 MHz (51.2 GB/s)	HEVC (H.265), VVC (H.266), VP9, AV1, AVS3	HDR10 (SMPTE2084); HDR10+ Adaptive & Gaming; Dolby Vision IQ with Precision Detail; BBC / NHK HLG; Technicolor / Philips JHDR (ESTI TS 103 433)	AI-Voice; AI-SR 2.0+ with detail creation; AI-PQ Scene Recognition 2.0; AI-PQ Object Recognition 3.0 with depth and richer PQ enhancement	External: HDMI 2.1 x4 (48 Gbps), USB 3.2 Gen 1 (5 Gbps) x2, USB 2.0, Wi-Fi 6E, optional 5G; Internal: PCIe Gen 3 2x, USB 3.2 Gen 1 (5 Gbps), UFS 2.1	Flagship 8K; Smart TV	Q4 2021
Pentonic 1000 (MT9972)	Quad-core; ARM Cortex-A73 @ 2.0 GHz	Mali-G57; MC2 @ 800 MHz	64-bit LPDDR4X @ 2166 MHz (34.1 GB/s)	HEVC (H.265), VVC (H.266), VP9, AV1, AVS3	HDR10 (SMPTE2084); HDR10+ Adaptive & Gaming; Dolby Vision IQ with Precision Detail; BBC / NHK HLG; Technicolor / Philips JHDR (ESTI TS 103 433)	AI-SR 2.0 with detail reconstruction; AI-PQ Scene Recognition 2.0; AI-PQ Object Recognition 3.0 with depth and richer PQ enhancement	External: HDMI 2.1 x2, HDMI 2.0 x2, USB 3.2 Gen 1 (5 Gbps) x2, USB 2.0, Wi-Fi 6E; Internal: USB 3.2 Gen 1 (5 Gbps), eMMC 5.1	Flagship; UltraHD (4K); Smart TV	Q4 2022
Pentonic 900 (MT9950)	Quad-core; ARM Cortex-A73 @ 1.8 GHz	Mali-G52; MC2 @ 800 MHz	96-bit LPDDR4 @ 3700 MHz	HEVC (H.265), VVC (H.266), VP9, AV1, AVS3	HDR10 (SMPTE2084); HDR10+ Adaptive & Gaming; Dolby Vision IQ with Precision Detail; BBC / NHK HLG; Technicolor / Philips JHDR (ESTI TS 103 433)				
Pentonic 800 (MT9655)	Quad-core; ARM Cortex-A73 @ 1.8 GHz	Mali-G57; MC1 @ ? MHz	64-bit DDR4 @ 1600 MHz (25.6 GB/s)	HEVC (H.265), VVC (H.266), VP9, AV1, AVS3	HDR10 (SMPTE2084); HDR10+ Adaptive & Gaming; Dolby Vision IQ with Precision Detail; BBC / NHK HLG; Technicolor / Philips JHDR (ESTI TS 103 433)	AI-Voice; AI-SR 3.0; AI-Contrast 2.0; AI-PQ Scene Recognition 2.0+; AI-PQ Object Recognition 2.5	External: DisplayPort 1.4a, HDMI 2.1a x4, USB 3.2 Gen 1 (5 Gbps), USB 2.0, Wi-Fi 6/6E/7; Internal: USB 3.2 Gen 1 (5 Gbps), eMMC 5.1	Premium; UltraHD (4K); Smart TV	Q3 2024
Pentonic 700 (MT9618; MT9653; MT9689)	Quad-core; ARM Cortex-A73 @ 1.4 GHz	Mali-G52; MC1 @ ? MHz	64-bit DDR4 @ 1600 MHz (25.6 GB/s)	HEVC (H.265), VVC (H.266), VP9, AV1, AVS3	HDR10 (SMPTE2084); HDR10+ Adaptive & Gaming; Dolby Vision IQ with Precision Detail; BBC / NHK HLG; Technicolor / Philips JHDR (ESTI TS 103 433)	AI-Voice; AI-SR 2.0 4K; AI-PQ Scene Recognition 2.0; AI-PQ Object Recognition 2.5	External: HDMI 2.1 x2, HDMI 2.0 x2, USB 3.2 Gen 1 (5 Gbps), USB 2.0, Wi-Fi 6E/7; Internal: USB 3.2 Gen 1 (5 Gbps), eMMC 5.1	Premium; UltraHD (4K); Smart TV	Q3 2022

== Wearable device SoCs ==
Model number	CPU ISA	Fab	CPU (Core / Freq)	CPU cache	GPU	Memory technology	Wireless radio technologies	Released
MT2502 / MT2503 (now managed and sold to Airoha)	ARMv7	?	Single-core; ARM7EJ-S @ 260 MHz				Bluetooth 2.1; EDR/4.0 LE, GPRS, GSM	Q3 2014
MT2523D (now managed and sold to Airoha)	ARMv7E-M	?	Single-core; ARM Cortex-M4 with FPU @ 208 MHz				Bluetooth 2.1; EDR/4.0 LE	
MT2523G (now managed and sold to Airoha)	ARMv7E-M	?	Single-core; ARM Cortex-M4 with FPU @ 208 MHz				Bluetooth 2.1; EDR/4.0 LE, GPS	
MT2601 (now managed and sold to Airoha)	ARMv7	28 nm	Dual-core; ARM Cortex-A7 @ 1.2 GHz	256 KB L2		LPDDR2/3 up to 512 MB	3G, GPS, Wi-Fi, Bluetooth 2.1; EDR/4.1 LE	Q1 2015
MT3303	ARMv7	?	Single-core; ARM7EJ-S			8 MB RAM + 8 MB Flash	GPS, Glonass, BeiDou, QZSS	
MT3332 / MT3333 (now managed and sold to Airoha)	ARMv7	?	Single-core; ARM7EJ-S @ 158 MHz			8 MB SPI (external)	GPS (US), QZSS (JP), Glonass (RU), Galileo (EU), Beidou (CN)	Q1 2013
MT3336 / MT3337 (now managed and sold to Airoha)	ARMv7	?	ARM7EJ-S @ 98 MHz			8 MB SPI (external)	GPS, GPIO, SPI, I2C, UART (x3)	
MT3339 (now managed and sold to Airoha)	ARMv7	?	ARM7EJ-S @ 98 MHz (low power)			8 MB SPI (external)	GPS, GPIO, SPI, I2C, UART (x3)	Q4 2011
MT6280	ARMv7-R	?	Single-core; ARM Cortex-R4			LPDDR1/2		
MT6572	ARMv7	28 nm	Dual-core; ARM Cortex-A7 @ 1.4 GHz	32 KB L1, 256 KB L2	Mali-400 MP1 @ 500 MHz	LPDDR2; 266 MHz	2G, Wi-Fi, Bluetooth	June 2013

== Internet-of-Things (IoT) SoCs ==
Model number	CPU ISA	Fab	CPU (Core / Freq)	Embedded memory	Cellular	I/O	Released
MT2621	ARMv7	?	Single-core ARM7 @ 260 MHz	160 KB SYSRAM + 4 MB SIPRAM	NB-IoT R14, GSM/GPRS	LCM, Camera; Audio AMP, Bluetooth 4.2	Nov 2017
MT2625	ARMv7E-M	?	Single-core @ 104 MHz; ARM Cortex-M with FPU	4 MB PSRAM + 4 MB NOR	NB-IoT R14	I2C, I2S, UART, SDIO, PCM, SPI	June 2017
MT3620	ARMv7-A	?	Single-core @ 500 MHz; ARM Cortex-A7 + Dual-core @ 200 MHz; ARM Cortex-M4 with FPU	?	?	ADC, GPIO, UART, I2C, I2S, PWM, SPI	
MT8362A (i300A)	ARMv8-A	?	Quad-core @ 1.5 GHz; ARM Cortex-A35	-	-	HDMI, S/PDIF, I2C, IR, Ethernet, MIPI CSI-2, SDIO 3.0, SPI, UART, USB 2.0 OTG/Host	
MT8362B (i300B)	ARMv8-A	?	Quad-core @ 1.3 GHz; ARM Cortex-A35	-	-	GPIO, USB, I2C, I2S, LVDS/MIPI	
MT8385 (i500); Genio 500	ARMv8-A	?	Quad-core @ 2.0 GHz; ARM Cortex-A73 + Quad-core @ 2.0 GHz; ARM Cortex-A53	-	-	I2C, I2S, LVDS/MIPI, MIPI CSI-2, SPI, USB	

Model numbers	Integrated platform features				
Model numbers	PSU	Baseband	RF	Antenna	Modem DSP
MT2621	Yes	Yes	Yes	Yes	Yes
MT2625	Yes	Yes	Yes	No	Yes

== Wireless connectivity SoCs ==
MT6630 (2014) is a five-in-one combo wireless SoC integrating dual-band 802.11a/b/g/n/ac, advanced Wi-Fi Direct and Miracast support, Bluetooth 4.1, ANT+, tri-band GPS and FM transceiver. It is intended to be paired with chips like the MT6595 octa-core smartphone processor which features an integrated 4G modem but no built-in Wi-Fi/Bluetooth/GPS/FM functionality. It could also be used in tablets in conjunction with a stand-alone application processor.

=== Wi‑Fi access points and routers chips ===
- RT3883 includes a MIPS 74KEc CPU and an IEEE 802.11n-conformant WNIC.
- RT6856 includes a MIPS 34KEc CPU and an IEEE 802.11ac-conformant WNIC.

=== Filogic Wi-Fi 7 chips ===
- Wi-Fi standard: Wi-Fi 7 (IEEE 802.11a/b/g/n/ac/ax/be)

Manufacturing node: 6 nm

Chipset	Launch date	2.4 GHz antenna config	5 GHz antenna config	6 GHz antenna config	Max through -put	QAM	Max band- width	MLO	MRU	AFC	Bluetooth	. CPU cores .	NPU	Interfaces	Ethernet connectivity
MT7925; Filogic 360	Nov 2023	2x2	2x2	2x2	Up to 2.9; Gbit/s	4096-QAM	Up to 160; MHz	Yes	Yes	No	Dual 5.4, LE Audio		No	PCIe 2.1 or USB 3.0	No
MT7927; Filogic 380	May 2022	2x2	2x2	2x2	Up to 6.5; Gbit/s	4096-QAM	Up to 320; MHz	Yes	Yes	No	BT 5.4, LE Audio		No	PCIe 4.0 or USB 3.0	No
MT7991; Filogic 660	Nov 2023	2x2	3x3	3x3	Up to 6.5; Gbit/s	4096-QAM	Up to 160; MHz	Yes	Yes	No	No		No	PCIe 3.0 or USB 3.0	No
MT7992; Filogic 660	May 2023	4x4	4x4	4x5	Up to 7.2; Gbit/s	4096-QAM	Up to 160; MHz	Yes	Yes	No	No		No	PCIe 3.0 or USB 3.0	No
MT7995; Filogic 680	Nov 2023	2x2	3x3	3x3	Up to 8.5; Gbit/s	4096-QAM	Up to320 MHz	Yes	Yes	No	No		No	PCIe 3.0 or USB 3.0	No
MT7996; Filogic 680	May 2023	4x4	4x4	4x5	Up to 13.5; Gbit/s	4096-QAM	Up to 320; MHz	Yes	Yes	No	No		No	PCIe 3.0 or USB 3.0	No
MT7988D; Filogic 860	Nov 2023	4x4	4x4	4x5	Up to 7.2; Gbit/s	4096-QAM	Up to 160; MHz	Yes	Yes	Yes	No	Triple ARM (Cortex-A73) @1.8 GHz	Yes	PCIe 3.0, USB 3.0, UART, SD, SPI, PWM, GPIO, OTP	1× USXGMII (10 Gbps), 1× 2.5Gbe PHY + 4× 1GbE ports
MT7988A; Filogic 880	May 2022	4x4	4x4	4x5	Up to 19; Gbit/s	4096-QAM	Up to 320; MHz	Yes	Yes	Yes	No	Quad ARM (Cortex-A73) @1.8 GHz	Yes	PCIe 4.0, USB 3.0, UART, SD, SPI, PWM, GPIO, OTP	2× USXGMII or USXGMII, 1× 2.5Gbe PHY + 4× 1GbE ports

== Automotive SoCs ==
Model		CPU ISA	Fab	CPU	GPU	Memory	NPU	Wireless radio technologies	DSP	Released	Notes
MT2712 (Autus I20)		ARMv8-A		2×Cortex-A72, 4×Cortex-A35, 1.2GHz max	Mali-T880 MP4	4GB LPDDR4 or DDR4				2018	
MT2713		ARMv8-A	TSMC 6nm	2×Cortex-A78, 6×Cortex-A55; 70k DMIPS	420 GFLOPS						Successor to 2712
MT8666		ARMv8-A	12nm	4×Cortex-A73 @2.2GHz, 4×Cortex-A53 @2.2GHz	ARM Heimdall	4GB LPDDR3-1866 1×32b, or 8GB LPDDR4-3600 2×16b	APU2.0	4G modem, WiFi 5.0, Bluetooth 4.1, GNSS (GPS, Glonass, BDS, Galileo)	6×cameras, 26MP ISP, 1080p30 HEVC decode, 1080p30 H.264 or 720p120 encode	2019	
MT8665 (Geely EcarX E01)				4 cores				4G modem	2×1080p display output	Q3 2019	Geely Boyue Pro
MT8675		ARMv8.2-A	TSMC 7nm	4×Cortex-A76, 4×Cortex-A55			APU3.0; 2.8 TOPS	5G modem, WiFi 5.0, Bluetooth 5.0, GNSS (GPS, Glonass, BDS, Galileo)	10×cameras 4K60 decode, 4K30 encode		AEC-Q104
MT2715	S	ARMv8.2-A	7/6nm	4×Cortex-A78 @1.6GHz, 4×Cortex-A55 @1.4GHz; 134k DMIPS	Mali-G57 MC5; 834 GLOPS, 281 GFLOPS (FP32)	LPDDR4x-4266 4×16b; 34GB/s (16GB max)	4.2 TOPS		10×cameras 4K90 decode (AV1, HEVC, H.264, VP9), 4K60 encode (HEVC, H.264), 6 display outputs incl. 3×4K60		
MT2715	H	ARMv8.2-A	7/6nm	3×Cortex-A78 @1.4GHz, 4×Cortex-A55 @1.2GHz; 99k DMIPS	Mali-G57 MC5; 834 GLOPS, 281 GFLOPS (FP32)	LPDDR4x-4266 4×16b; 34GB/s (16GB max)	4.2 TOPS		10×cameras 4K90 decode (AV1, HEVC, H.264, VP9), 4K60 encode (HEVC, H.264), 6 display outputs incl. 3×4K60		
MT2715	M	ARMv8.2-A	7/6nm	2×Cortex-A78 @1.4GHz, 4×Cortex-A55 @1.2GHz; 69k DMIPS	Mali-G57 MC5; 834 GLOPS, 281 GFLOPS (FP32)	LPDDR4x-4266 4×16b; 34GB/s (16GB max)	2.5 TOPS		10×cameras 4K90 decode (AV1, HEVC, H.264, VP9), 4K60 encode (HEVC, H.264), 6 display outputs incl. 3×4K60		
MT8673 (BYD 9000)		ARMv9-A (64-bit)	4nm	165k DMIPS		LPDDR5X	80 TOPS	5G	11 display outputs		Based on MT8673, first in Denza B8
Dimensity P1 Ultra	MT8626	ARMv9-A (64-bit)	4 nm (TSMC N4P)	4×Cortex-A715 @2.9GHz, 4×Cortex-A510; 175k DMIPS	Mali-G615 MC6 6-core; 1.8 TFLOPS	LPDDR5x-8533; 136GB/s	MediaTek NPU 780; 23 TOPS, 7B parameters	WiFi 6E, Bluetooth, GNSS	4K60 encode & decode, 6 display outputs, HDR ISP, H.265	Q4 2025	
Dimensity P1 Ultra	MT8646	ARMv9-A (64-bit)	4 nm (TSMC N4P)	4×Cortex-A715 @2.9GHz, 4×Cortex-A510; 175k DMIPS	Mali-G615 MC6 6-core; 1.8 TFLOPS	LPDDR5x-8533; 136GB/s	MediaTek NPU 780; 23 TOPS, 7B parameters	4G modem, WiFi 6E, Bluetooth, GNSS	4K60 encode & decode, 6 display outputs, HDR ISP, H.265	Q4 2025	
Dimensity P1 Ultra	MT8676	ARMv9-A (64-bit)	4 nm (TSMC N4P)	4×Cortex-A715 @2.9GHz, 4×Cortex-A510; 175k DMIPS	Mali-G615 MC6 6-core; 1.8 TFLOPS	LPDDR5x-8533; 136GB/s	MediaTek NPU 780; 23 TOPS, 7B parameters	5G modem, WiFi 6E, Bluetooth, GNSS	4K60 encode & decode, 6 display outputs, HDR ISP, H.265	Q4 2025	Likely automotive version of Dimensity 8300; used by XPeng since early 2026
Dimensity S1 Ultra	MT8678	ARMv9-A (64-bit)	3nm	8×big cores; 280k DMIPS	4 TFLOPS	30GB 64-bit LPDDR5X-7500 4×16b; 60GB/s	53.7TOPS, 13B parameters	5G modem, WiFi, Bluetooth, GNSS	8K30 decode, 4K120 encode, 10 display outputs, HDR ISP	Q4 2025	Deepal L06, Chery Fulwin T9L
Dimensity S1 Ultra	MT8648	ARMv9-A (64-bit)	3nm	8×big cores; 280k DMIPS	4 TFLOPS	30GB 64-bit LPDDR5X-7500 4×16b; 60GB/s	53.7TOPS, 13B parameters	4G	8K30 decode, 4K120 encode, 10 display outputs, HDR ISP	Q4 2025	
Dimensity S1 Ultra	MT8628	ARMv9-A (64-bit)	3nm	8×big cores; 280k DMIPS	4 TFLOPS	30GB 64-bit LPDDR5X-7500 4×16b; 60GB/s	53.7TOPS, 13B parameters	WiFi 7	8K30 decode, 4K120 encode, 10 display outputs, HDR ISP	Q4 2025	
MT8678 (CT-X1)		ARMv9.2-A	3nm	1×Cortex-X925 @2.5GHz, 3×Cortex-X4 @2.0GHz, 4×Cortex-A720 @1.9GHz; 260k DMIPS	Mali-G615 MC6 ARM Krake; 3-4 TFLOPS	30GB 64-bit LPDDR5X-8533 2×32b; 68.2GB/s	APU8.0; 46TOPS @INT8, 11.5TOPS @FP16, up to 13B parameter models	5G modem, WiFi 7, 2×Bluetooth w/ LE Audio	16×cameras, 8 display outputs, 8K 10-bit 120Hz output, 10 display outputs (1×8960×1316, 5×1920×1080), 2×HIFI5 @800MHz		Likely Dimensity 9400. PCIe Gen4, UFS 4.0, 2×2.5Gb Ethernet. First used inYangwang U8L
MT2718		ARMv9.2-A	TSMC 3nm	280k DMIPS	ARM Avalon; 4TFLOPS	30GB 64-bit LPDDR5X-8533 2×32b; 68.2GB/s	APU8.0; 55TOPS		16×cameras, 8K30 decode & encode, 12 display outputs, 6×4K60 display engine		
Dimensity AX C-series	C-V1	ARMv9-A (64-bit)			Nvidia Blackwell		Nvidia Blackwell				Announced March 2024. Supports Nvidia Drive OS. DLSS, ray tracing, targets 4K60 graphics rendering
Dimensity AX C-series	C-M1	ARMv9-A (64-bit)			Nvidia Blackwell		Nvidia Blackwell				Announced March 2024. Supports Nvidia Drive OS. DLSS, ray tracing, targets 4K60 graphics rendering
Dimensity AX C-series	C-Y1	ARMv9-A (64-bit)			Nvidia Blackwell		Nvidia Blackwell				Announced March 2024. Supports Nvidia Drive OS. DLSS, ray tracing, targets 4K60 graphics rendering
Dimensity AX C-series	C-X1	ARMv9-A (64-bit)	3nm	12 cores	Nvidia Blackwell; 10.2 TFLOPS		Nvidia Blackwell; 400TOPS		12×cameras		Announced March 2024. Supports Nvidia Drive OS. DLSS, ray tracing, targets 4K60 graphics rendering
CT-Y0		ARMv9-A (64-bit)	4nm						3×3K displays		
CT-Y1		ARMv9-A (64-bit)	4nm				Up to 7B parameter models	5G modem, WiFi, Bluetooth, GNSS	12×cameras, 32MP ISP, 6 display outputs		AEC-Q100 Grade2

== See also ==
- List of Qualcomm Snapdragon systems on chips
- List of Samsung Exynos processors
