= Instructions per second =

Measure of a computer's processing speed

Computer processing efficiency, measured as the power needed per million instructions per second (watts per MIPS)

Instructions per second (IPS) is a measure of a computer's processor speed. For complex instruction set computers (CISCs), different instructions take different amounts of time, so the value measured depends on the instruction mix; even for comparing processors in the same family the IPS measurement can be problematic. Many reported IPS values have represented "peak" execution rates on artificial instruction sequences with few branches and no cache contention, whereas realistic workloads typically lead to significantly lower IPS values. Memory hierarchy also greatly affects processor performance, an issue barely considered in IPS calculations. Because of these problems, synthetic benchmarks such as Dhrystone are now generally used to estimate computer performance in commonly used applications, and raw IPS has fallen into disuse.

The term is commonly used in association with a metric prefix (k, M, G, T, P, or E) to form kilo instructions per second (kIPS), mega instructions per second (MIPS), giga instructions per second (GIPS) and so on. Formerly TIPS was used occasionally for "thousand IPS".

== Computing ==
IPS can be calculated using this equation:

$$\text{IPS} = \text{sockets} \times \frac{\text{cores}}{\text{chip}} \times \text{clock} \times \frac{\text{Is}}{\text{cycle}}$$

However, the instructions/cycle measurement depends on the instruction sequence, the data and external factors.

== Scaling units ==
For the most early 8-bit and 16-bit microprocessors, performance was measured in thousand instructions per second, or kilo instructions per second (kIPS).

The term "mega instructions per second" became useful in the late 1970s. The IBM System/370 model 158–3 and the VAX-11/780 were considered roughly equivalent at 1 MIPS.

== Types of instruction ==
The speed of a given CPU depends on many factors, such as the type of instructions being executed, the execution order and the presence of branch instructions (problematic in CPU pipelines). CPU instruction rates are different from clock frequencies, usually reported in Hz, as each instruction may require several clock cycles to complete or the processor may be capable of executing multiple independent instructions simultaneously. MIPS can be useful when comparing performance between processors made with similar architecture (e.g. PIC microcontrollers), but they are difficult to compare between differing CPU architectures, especially between RISC and CISC architectures. This led to the term "Meaningless Indicator of Processor Speed," or less commonly, "Meaningless Indices of Performance," being popular amongst technical people by the mid-1980s.

=== The Gibson Mix (1959) ===
Before standard benchmarks were available, average speed rating of computers was based on calculations for a mix of instructions with the results given in kilo instructions per second (kIPS). Among the first attempts at defining a specific collections of instructions to time was the Gibson Mix, produced by Jack Clark Gibson of IBM for scientific applications in 1959.

Gibson divided computer instructions into 12 classes, based on the IBM 704 architecture, adding a 13th class to account for indexing time. Weights were primarily based on analysis of seven scientific programs run on the 704, with a small contribution from some IBM 650 programs. The overall score was then the weighted sum of the average execution speed for instructions in each class.

The Gibson Mix	%
1. Loads and Store	31.2
2. Fixed Point Add and Subtract	6.1
3. Compares	3.8
4. Branches	16.6
5. Floating Add and Subtract	6.9
6. Floating Multiply	3.8
7. Floating Divide	1.5
8. Fixed Point Multiply	0.6
9. Fixed Point Divide	0.2
10. Shifting	4.4
11. Logical, And, Or, etc.	1.6
12. Instructions Not Using Registers	5.3
13. Indexing	18
Total	100

The Gibson Mix is a product of its era, when computer speeds were still measured in kIPS. Other ratings, such as the ADP mix which does not include floating point operations, were produced for commercial applications. These early ratings were nowhere as systemic as the later approaches, although the idea of creating a benchmark to resemble real-world applications (later called a "synthetic benchmark") would persist.

=== Two flavors of VAX MIPS ===
The VAX-11/780 was released in 1977. It was marketed as being able to execute the equivalent of 1 million System/370 instructions per second, the first minicomputer to achieve such a speed. VAX-11/780 would quickly become a unit of reference for MIPS measurements, in two separate benchmarks:

- The Whetstone benchmark of 1972 was modified in 1980 to combine three of its integer-operation speed measures into a "VAX MIPS". It originally included a mix of 42 statements written in ALGOL 60 (124 instructions on the KDF9 compiler), though by 1980 it had been rewritten in Fortran.
- The integer-and-string-heavy Dhrystone benchmark of 1984 inherited the idea of using VAX as a MIPS reference. Its results were reported in "DMIPS", for Dhrystone MIPS. Each Dhrystone MIPS was defined as the ability to run the Dhrystone main loop 1757 times per second, the score VAX-11/780 received on this benchmark.

=== Other instruction mixes ===
zMIPS refers to the MIPS measure used internally by IBM to rate its mainframe servers (zSeries, IBM System z9, and IBM System z10).

Weighted million operations per second (WMOPS) is a similar measurement, used for audio codecs.

== Other factors that affect instructions per second ==
Effective MIPS speeds are highly dependent on the programming language used: some compilers generate highly-efficient code, others do not. The Whetstone Report has a table showing MWIPS speeds of PCs via early interpreters and compilers up to modern languages. The first PC compiler was for BASIC (1982) when a 4.8 MHz 8088/87 CPU obtained 0.01 MWIPS. Results on a 2.4 GHz Intel Core 2 Duo (1 CPU 2007) vary from 9.7 MWIPS using BASIC Interpreter, 59 MWIPS via BASIC Compiler, 347 MWIPS using 1987 Fortran, 1,534 MWIPS through HTML/Java to 2,403 MWIPS using a modern C/C++ compiler.

== Timeline of instructions per second ==
=== CPU results ===
Processor / System	Dhrystone MIPS or MIPS, and frequency	D instructions per clock cycle	D instructions per clock cycle per core	Year	Ref.
UNIVAC I	0.002 MIPS at 2.25 MHz	0.0008	0.0008	1951	
IBM 7030 ("Stretch")	1.200 MIPS at 3.30 MHz	0.364	0.364	1961	
CDC 6600	10.00 MIPS at 10.00 MHz	1	1	1965	
Intel 4004	0.092 MIPS at 0.740 MHz (Not Dhrystone)	0.124	0.124	1971	
IBM System/370 Model 158	0.640 MIPS at 8.696 MHz	0.0736	0.0736	1972	
Intel 8080	0.290 MIPS at 2.000 MHz (Not Dhrystone)	0.145	0.145	1974	
Cray 1	160.0 MIPS at 80.00 MHz	2	2	1975	
MOS Technology 6502	0.430 MIPS at 1.000 MHz	0.43	0.43	1975	
MCP-1600	2.25 MIPS at 3.3 MHz, 4 ϕ	0.75	0.75	1975	
Intel 8085	0.435 MIPS at 3.000 MHz (Not Dhrystone)	0.145	0.145	1976	
Zilog Z80A	0.580 MIPS at 4.000 MHz (Not Dhrystone)	0.145	0.145	1976	
Signetics 8X300	4.000 MIPS at 8.000 MHz	0.5	0.5	1976	
Motorola 6802	0.500 MIPS at 1.000 MHz	0.5	0.5	1977	
IBM System/370 Model 158-3	0.730 MIPS at 8.696 MHz	0.0839	0.0839	1977	
VAX-11/780	1.000 MIPS at 5.000 MHz	0.2	0.2	1977	
Motorola 6809	0.420 MIPS at 1.000 MHz	0.42	0.42	1978	
Intel 8086	0.330 MIPS at 5.000 MHz	0.066	0.066	1978	
Fujitsu MB8843	2.000 MIPS at 2.000 MHz (Not Dhrystone)	1	1	1978	
Intel 8088	0.750 MIPS at 10.00 MHz	0.075	0.075	1979	
Motorola 68000	1.400 MIPS at 8.000 MHz	0.175	0.175	1979	
Zilog Z8001/Z8002	1.5 MIPS at 6 MHz	0.25	0.25	1979	
Intel 8035/8039/8048	0.400 MIPS at 6 MHz (Not Dhrystone)	.066	.066	1980	
Fujitsu MB8843/MB8844	6 MIPS at 6 MHz (Not Dhrystone)	1	1	1980	
Zilog Z80/Z80H	1.16 MIPS at 8 MHz (Not Dhrystone)	0.145	0.145	1981	
Motorola 6802	1.79 MIPS at 3.58 MHz	0.5	0.5	1981	
Zilog Z8001/Z8002B	2.5 MIPS at 10 MHz	0.25	0.25	1981	
Intel 80286	1.28 MIPS at 12 MHz	0.107	0.107	1982	
Motorola 68010	2.407 MIPS at 12.5 MHz	0.193	0.193	1982	
NEC V20	4 MIPS at 8 MHz (Not Dhrystone)	0.5	0.5	1982	
Texas Instruments TMS32010	5 MIPS at 20 MHz	0.25	0.25	1983	
NEC V30	5 MIPS at 10 MHz (Not Dhrystone)	0.5	0.5	1983	
Motorola 68020	4.848 MIPS at 16 MHz	0.303	0.303	1984	
Hitachi HD63705	2 MIPS at 2 MHz	1	1	1985	
Intel i386DX	2.15 MIPS at 16 MHz	0.134	0.134	1985	
Hitachi-Motorola 68HC000	3.5 MIPS at 20 MHz	0.175	0.175	1985	
Intel 8751	1 MIPS at 12 MHz	0.083	0.083	1985	
WDC 65C816 / Ricoh 5A22	0.22 MIPS at 2.8 MHz	0.08	0.08	1985	
ARM2	4 MIPS at 8 MHz	0.5	0.5	1986	
Stanford MIPS R2000 / R2000A	8 / 9.8 MIPS at 12.5 MHz	0.64 - 0.78	0.64 - 0.78	1986 / 1988	
Sun SPARC / Fujitsu MB86900	10 MIPS at 16.6 MHz	0.6	0.6	1986	
Texas Instruments TMS34010	6 MIPS at 50 MHz	0.12	0.12	1986	
NEC V70	6.6 MIPS at 20 MHz	0.33	0.33	1987	
Motorola 68030	18 MIPS at 50 MHz	0.36	0.36	1987	
Gmicro/200	10 MIPS at 20 MHz	0.5	0.5	1987	
Texas Instruments TMS320C20	12.5 MIPS at 25 MHz	0.5	0.5	1987	
Analog Devices ADSP-2100	12.5 MIPS at 12.5 MHz	1	1	1987	
Texas Instruments TMS320C25	25 MIPS at 50 MHz	0.5	0.5	1987	
Intel i486DX	8.7 MIPS at 25 MHz	0.348	0.348	1989	
NEC V80	16.5 MIPS at 33 MHz	0.5	0.5	1989	
Intel i860	25 MIPS at 25 MHz	1	1	1989	
ARM3	12 MIPS at 25 MHz	0.5	0.5	1989	
Motorola 68040	44 MIPS at 40 MHz	1.1	1.1	1990	
AMD Am386	9 MIPS at 40 MHz	0.225	0.225	1991	
Intel i486DX	11.1 MIPS at 33 MHz	0.336	0.336	1991	
Intel i860	50 MIPS at 50 MHz	1	1	1991	
Intel i486DX2	25.6 MIPS at 66 MHz	0.388	0.388	1992	
Alpha 21064 (EV4)	86 MIPS at 150 MHz	0.573	0.573	1992	
Alpha 21064 (EV4S/EV45)	135 MIPS at 200 MHz	0.675	0.675	1993	
MIPS R4400	85 MIPS at 150 MHz	0.567	0.567	1993	
Gmicro/500	132 MIPS at 66 MHz	2	2	1993	
IBM-Motorola PowerPC 601	157.7 MIPS at 80 MHz	1.971	1.971	1993	
ARM7	40 MIPS at 45 MHz	0.889	0.889	1994	
Intel DX4	70 MIPS at 100 MHz	0.7	0.7	1994	
Motorola 68060	110 MIPS at 75 MHz	1.33	1.33	1994	
Intel Pentium	188 MIPS at 100 MHz	1.88	1.88	1994	
Microchip PIC16F	5 MIPS at 20 MHz	0.25	0.25	1995	
IBM-Motorola PowerPC 603e	188 MIPS at 133 MHz	1.414	1.414	1995	
ARM 7500FE	35.9 MIPS at 40 MHz	0.9	0.9	1996	
IBM-Motorola PowerPC 603ev	423 MIPS at 300 MHz	1.41	1.41	1996	
DEC StrongARM SA-110	270 MIPS at 233 MHz	1.15	1.15	1996	
Intel Pentium Pro	541 MIPS at 200 MHz	2.7	2.7	1996	
Hitachi SH-4	360 MIPS at 200 MHz	1.8	1.8	1997	
IBM-Motorola PowerPC 750	525 MIPS at 233 MHz	2.3	2.3	1997	
Zilog eZ80	6.6 MIPS at 20 MHz	0.33	0.33	1999	
Intel Pentium III	2,054 MIPS at 600 MHz	3.4	3.4	1999	
Freescale MPC8272	760 MIPS at 400 MHz	1.9	1.9	2000	
AMD Athlon	3,561 MIPS at 1.2 GHz	3.0	3.0	2000	
Silicon Recognition ZISC 78	8,600 MIPS at 33 MHz	260.6	260.6	2000	
ARM11	515 MIPS at 412 MHz	1.25	1.25	2002	
AMD Athlon XP 2500+	7,527 MIPS at 1.83 GHz	4.1	4.1	2003	
Intel Pentium 4 Extreme Edition	9,726 MIPS at 3.2 GHz	3.0	3.0	2003	
Microchip PIC10F	1 MIPS at 4 MHz	0.25	0.25	2004	
ARM Cortex-M3	125 MIPS at 100 MHz	1.25	1.25	2004	
Nios II	190 MIPS at 165 MHz	1.13	1.13	2004	
MIPS32 4KEc	356 MIPS at 233 MHz	1.5	1.5	2004	
VIA C7	1,799 MIPS at 1.3 GHz	1.4	1.4	2005	
ARM Cortex-A8	2,000 MIPS at 1.0 GHz	2.0	2.0	2005	
AMD Athlon FX-57	12,000 MIPS at 2.8 GHz	4.3	4.3	2005	
AMD Athlon 64 3800+ X2 (2-core)	14,564 MIPS at 2.0 GHz	7.3	3.6	2005	
PowerPC G4 MPC7448	3,910 MIPS at 1.7 GHz	2.3	2.3	2005	
ARM Cortex-R4	450 MIPS at 270 MHz	1.66	1.66	2006	
MIPS32 24K	604 MIPS at 400 MHz	1.51	1.51	2006	
PS3 Cell BE (PPE only)	10,240 MIPS at 3.2 GHz	3.2	3.2	2006	
IBM Xenon CPU (3-core)	19,200 MIPS at 3.2 GHz	6.0	2.0	2005	
AMD Athlon FX-60 (2-core)	18,938 MIPS at 2.6 GHz	7.3	3.6	2006	
Intel Core 2 Extreme X6800 (2-core)	27,079 MIPS at 2.93 GHz	9.2	4.6	2006	
Intel Core 2 Extreme QX6700 (4-core)	49,161 MIPS at 2.66 GHz	18.4	4.6	2006	
MIPS64 20Kc	1,370 MIPS at 600 MHz	2.3	2.3	2007	
P.A. Semi PA6T-1682M	8,800 MIPS at 1.8 GHz	4.4	4.4	2007	
Qualcomm Scorpion (Cortex-A8-like)	2,100 MIPS at 1 GHz	2.1	2.1	2008	
Intel Atom N270	3,846 MIPS at 1.6 GHz	2.4	2.4	2008	
Intel Core 2 Extreme QX9770 (4-core)	59,455 MIPS at 3.2 GHz	18.6	4.6	2008	
Intel Core i7 920 (4-core)	82,300 MIPS at 2.93 GHz	28.089	7.022	2008	
ARM Cortex-M0	45 MIPS at 50 MHz	0.9	0.9	2009	
ARM Cortex-A9 (2-core)	7,500 MIPS at 1.5 GHz	5.0	2.5	2009	
AMD Phenom II X4 940 Black Edition	42,820 MIPS at 3.0 GHz	14.3	3.5	2009	
AMD Phenom II X6 1100T	78,440 MIPS at 3.3 GHz	23.7	3.9	2010	
Intel Core i7 Extreme Edition 980X (6-core)	147,600 MIPS at 3.33 GHz	44.7	7.46	2010	
ARM Cortex-A5	1,256 MIPS at 800 MHz	1.57	1.57	2011	
ARM Cortex-A7	2,850 MIPS at 1.5 GHz	1.9	1.9	2011	
Qualcomm Krait (Cortex-A15-like, 2-core)	9,900 MIPS at 1.5 GHz	6.6	3.3	2011	
AMD E-350 (2-core)	10,000 MIPS at 1.6 GHz	6.25	3.125	2011	
Nvidia Tegra 3 (Quad core Cortex-A9)	13,800 MIPS at 1.5 GHz	9.2	2.5	2011	
Samsung Exynos 5250 (Cortex-A15-like 2-core)	14,000 MIPS at 2.0 GHz	7.0	3.5	2011	
Intel Core i5-2500K (4-core)	83,000 MIPS at 3.3 GHz	25.152	6.288	2011	
Intel Core i7 875K	92,100 MIPS at 2.93 GHz	31.4	7.85	2011	
AMD FX-8150 (8-core)	90,749 MIPS at 3.6 GHz	25.2	3.15	2011	
Intel Core i7 2600K (4-core)	117,160 MIPS at 3.4 GHz	34.45	8.61	2011	
Intel Core i7-3960X (6-core)	176,170 MIPS at 3.3 GHz	53.38	8.89	2011	
AMD FX-8350 (8-core)	97,125 MIPS at 4.2 GHz	23.1	2.9	2012	
AMD FX-9590 (8-core)	115,625 MIPS at 5.0 GHz	23.1	2.9	2012	
Intel Core i7 3770K (4-core)	106,924 MIPS at 3.9 GHz	27.4	6.9	2012	
Intel Core i7 4770K (4-core)	133,740 MIPS at 3.9 GHz	34.29	8.57	2013	
Intel Core i7 5960X (8-core)	298,190 MIPS at 3.5 GHz	85.2	10.65	2014	
Intel Core i7 6950X (10-core)	320,440 MIPS at 3.5 GHz	91.55	9.16	2016	
ARM Cortex-A73 (4-core)	71,120 MIPS at 2.8 GHz	25.4	6.35	2016	
ARM Cortex-A75	?	?	8.2-9.5	2017	
ARM Cortex-A76	?	?	10.7-12.4	2018	
ARM Cortex-A53	2,300 MIPS at 1 GHz	2.3	2.3	2012	
ARM Cortex-A35	2,100 MIPS at 1 GHz	2.1	2.1	2015	
ARM Cortex-A72	15,750 to 18,375 at 2.5 GHz	6.3 to 7.35	6.3 to 7.35	2015	
ARM Cortex-A57	10,250 to 11,750 at 2.5 GHz	4.1 to 4.7	4.1 to 4.7	2012	
Sitara AM64x ARM Cortex-A53 (2-core)	5,992 MIPS at 1 GHz	6	3	2021	
AMD Ryzen 7 1800X (8-core)	304,510 MIPS at 3.7 GHz	82.3	10.29	2017	
Intel Core i7-8086K (6-core)	221,720 MIPS at 5.0 GHz	44.34	7.39	2018	
Intel Core i9-9900K (8-core)	412,090 MIPS at 4.7 GHz	87.68	10.96	2018	
AMD Ryzen 9 3950X (16-core)	749,070 MIPS at 4.6 GHz	162.84	10.18	2019	
AMD Ryzen Threadripper 3990X (64 core)	2,356,230 MIPS at 4.35 GHz	541.66	8.46	2020	
Intel Core i5-11600K (6-core)	346,350 MIPS at 4.92 GHz	57.72	11.73	2021	
Processor / System	Dhrystone MIPS / MIPS	D instructions per clock cycle	D instructions per clock cycle per core	Year	Source

=== Multi-CPU cluster results ===
Processor / System	Dhrystone MIPS or MIPS, and frequency	D instructions per clock cycle	D instructions per clock cycle per core	Year	Ref.
LINKS-1 Computer Graphics System (257-processor)	642.5 MIPS at 10 MHz	2.5	0.25	1982	
Sega System 16 (4-processor)	16.33 MIPS at 10 MHz	4.083	1.020	1985	
Namco System 21 (10-processor)	73.927 MIPS at 25 MHz	2.957	0.296	1988	
Atari Hard Drivin' (7-processor)	33.573 MIPS at 50 MHz	0.671	0.0959	1989	
NEC SX-3 (4-processor)	680 MIPS at 400 MHz	1.7	0.425	1989	
Namco System 21 (Galaxian³) (96-processor)	1,660.386 MIPS at 40 MHz	41.51	0.432	1990	
SGI Onyx RealityEngine^{2} (36-processor)	2,640 MIPS at 150 MHz	17.6	0.489	1993	
Namco Magic Edge Hornet Simulator (36-processor)	2,880 MIPS at 150 MHz	19.2	0.533	1993	
Sega Naomi Multiboard (32-processor)	6,400 MIPS at 200 MHz	32	1	1999	
Raspberry Pi 2 (quad-core ARM Cortex-A7)	4,744 MIPS at 1.0 GHz	4.744	1.186	2014	
Processor / System	Dhrystone MIPS / MIPS	D instructions per clock cycle	D instructions per clock cycle per core	Year	Source

== See also ==
- TOP500
- Floating point operations per second (FLOPS)
- SUPS
- Benchmark (computing)
- BogoMips (measurement of CPU speed made by the Linux kernel)
- Instructions per cycle
- Cycles per instruction
- Dhrystone (benchmark) - DMIPS integer benchmark
- Whetstone (benchmark) - floating-point benchmark
- Million service units (MSU)
- Computer performance by orders of magnitude
- Performance per watt
- Data-rate units
