= Oppo A5 (2025) =

Android smartphone series

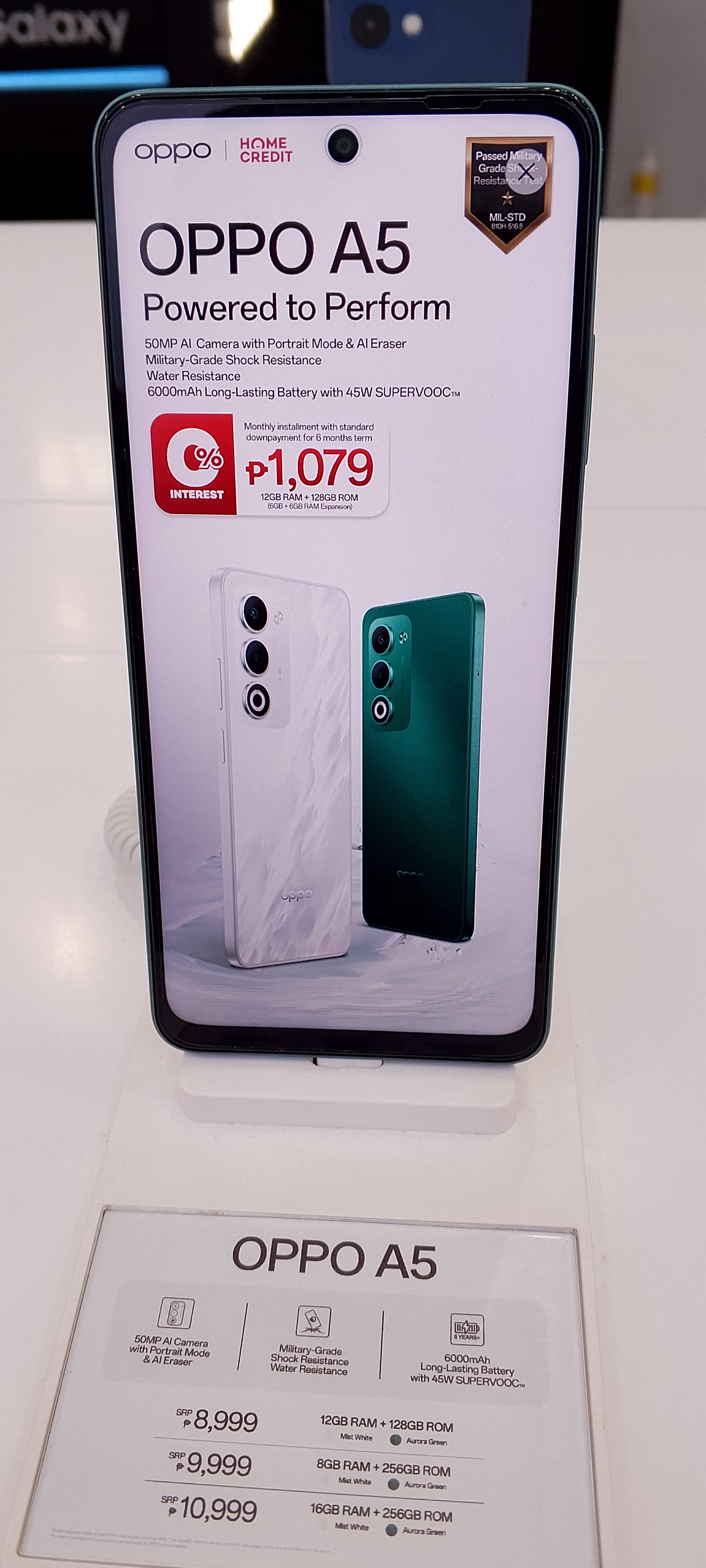
- Oppo A5 (2025) in Aurora Green
- Brand: Oppo
- Manufacturer: Oppo
- Series: Oppo A series
- First released: May 15, 2025
- Availability by region: May 15, 2025
- Predecessor: Oppo A5 (2020)
- Related: Oppo A5x
- Compatible networks: 4G version: GSM / HSPA / LTE; 5G version: GSM / HSPA / LTE / 5G
- Colors: Midnight Purple (4G only), Aurora Green, Mist White
- Dimensions: 165.7 mm (6.52 in) H 76.2 mm (3.00 in) W 8 mm (0.31 in) D
- Weight: 4G version: 193 g (6.8 oz); 5G version: 194 g (6.8 oz)
- Operating system: Android 15 with ColorOS 15
- System-on-chip: 4G version: Qualcomm Snapdragon 6s 4G Gen 1 (SM-6115) (11 nm); 5G version: MediaTek Dimensity 6300 (6 nm)
- CPU: 4G version: Octa-core (4x2.1 GHz Cortex-A73 & 4x1.8 GHz Cortex-A53); 5G version: Octa-core (2x2.4 GHz Cortex-A76 & 6x2.0 GHz Cortex-A55)
- GPU: 4G version: Adreno 610; 5G version: Mali-G57 MC2
- Memory: 4 GB, 6 GB, or 8 GB RAM
- Storage: 128 GB or 256 GB; 4G version: UFS 2.1; 5G version: UFS 2.2
- Removable storage: microSDXC
- SIM: Dual Nano-SIM
- Battery: 6,000 mAh non-removable
- Charging: 45W SUPERVOOC™ Flash Charge, 33W PPS, 13.5W PD
- Rear camera: Dual: • 50 MP, f/1.8, (wide), PDAF • 2 MP, f/2.4, (depth); Video: 1080p@30fps
- Front camera: 4G version: 5 MP, f/2.2, (wide); 5G version: 8 MP, f/2.0, (wide); Video: 1080p@30fps
- Display: 6.67 in (169 mm) IPS LCD; 720 × 1604 pixels, 20:9 ratio (~264 ppi density); Refresh rate: 90 Hz (4G) / 120 Hz (5G); Protection: Corning Gorilla Glass 7i
- Sound: Loudspeaker, 3.5mm audio jack
- Connectivity: Wi-Fi 802.11 a/b/g/n/ac, dual-band Bluetooth 5.0 (4G) / 5.4 (5G); GPS, GLONASS, GALILEO, BDS, QZSS; NFC (region dependent); USB Type-C 2.0, OTG
- Data inputs: Fingerprint (side-mounted), accelerometer, proximity, compass
- Water resistance: IP65 dust tight and water resistant
- Model: CPH2727 (4G); CPH2735, PKW120 (5G)
- Website: https://www.oppo.com/ph/smartphones/series-a/a5/

The Oppo A5 (2025) 4G and 5G are Android-based smartphones manufactured, designed, and marketed by Oppo and was released on May 15, 2025 along with the Oppo A5x. These phones are booted with the ColorOS 15 user interface.

The device was applied by its 48-month Fluency Protection certification for smooth performance. In India, the 5G variant was released on June 20, 2025.

== Design and appearance ==
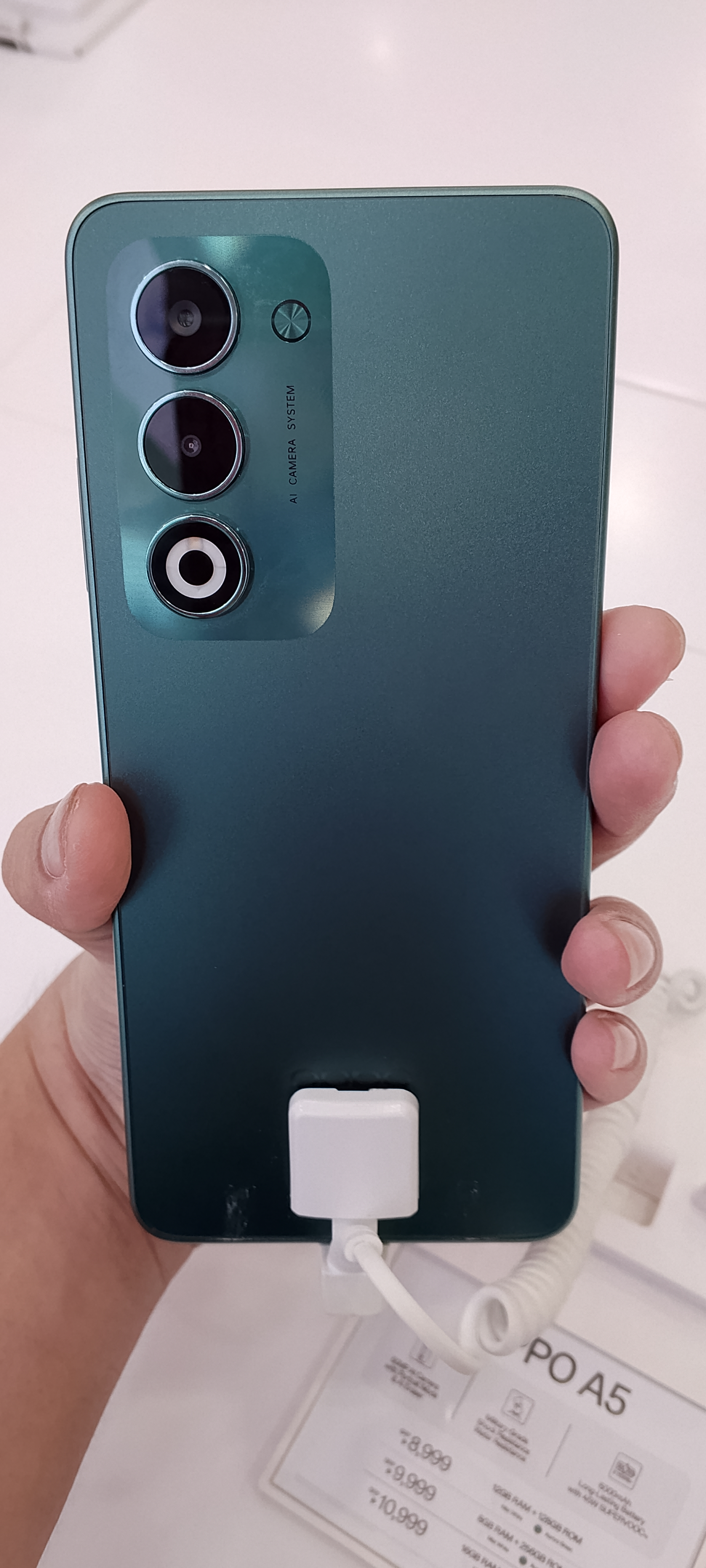
rear panel of the Oppo A5 (2025)

The back and the frames were made of plastic and the front is made of glass, which is double-tempered by 160%. In the front, both model are equipped by a Gorilla Glass 7i. With dimensions at 165.7 mm of height by 72.2 mm of width and 8 mm of thickness, the phone weights at 193g and 194g for the 5G version. The phones were protected and engineered by an IP65 splash and dust resistance and a 360-degree MIL-STD 810H military-grade shock resistance, which was made by applying foam adhesive and precision-applied glue.

It was available at the following color options:

- Mist White
- Aurora Green
- Midnight Purple (4G model only)

== Specifications ==
=== Hardware ===
The Oppo A5 4G is powered by the following components - a Snapdragon 6s Gen 1 system-on-a-chip under its octa-core containg four Cortex-A73 cores clocking at 2.1GHz and four Cortex-A53 cores clocking at 1.8GHz, and an Adreno 610 GPU. On the other hand, the 5G version has a slightly powerful processor, with a MediaTek Dimensity 6300 chhipset, a slightly powerful octa-core composed of four Cortex-A76 cores clocking at 2.2GHz and four Cortex-A55 cores clocking at 2.0GHz, and a Mali-G57 MC2 graphics processor. It was housed with a 6,000 mAh non-removable battery with lifespan durability up to 5 years and also includes a 45-watt SUPERVOOC fast-charging support, which provides 21 minutes of 30% charge. For the storage, it has a capacity of 126GB or 256GB of UFS 2.1 (4G)/ UFS 2.2 (5G) interal storage and a memory of 4GB (4G version only), 6GB, or 8GB of RAM. It also has a physical expandable storage via microSDXC card.

The Oppo A5 (2025) features a 6.67-inch IPS LCD display with a resolution of 720 × 1604 pixels, a 20:9 aspect ratio, a 90Hz refresh rate for the 4G version and a 120Hz refresh rate for the 5G version, and a maximum brightness of 1000 nits. The rear camera is composed of these 2 lenses: a 50-megapixel main camera with an AI Eraser 2.0 feature to remove any objects, an AI Clarity Enhancer for sharpening photography, and AI Smart Image Matting 2.0 for editing, and a 2-megapixel depth sensor. Both models can record up to 1080p at 30fps. In the front the 4G version was installed by a 5MP camera, while the 5G version has an 8-megapixel camera.

=== Software ===
Both smartphones run on the ColorOS 15 user interface based on the Android 15 mobile operating system.
