= List of UNISOC systems on chips =

List of UNISOC processors

This is a list of UNISOC (formerly Spreadtrum) processors for use in feature phones, smartphones, tablets, laptops, smartwatches and other devices.

== Feature phone processors ==
Model number	Fab	CPU					GPU	Memory technology	Wireless radio technologies	Released	Utilizing devices
Model number	Fab	ISA	μarch	Cores	Freq. (MHz)	Cache	GPU	Memory technology	Wireless radio technologies	Released	Utilizing devices
SC6500	40 nm	ARM9	ARM9EJ-S	1	208	?	—N/a	Integrated; 32 Mbit pSRAM	GSM850/EGSM900, DCS1800/PCS1900, GPRS class 12	2011	List: Samsung KeyStone3
SC6531	40 nm	ARM9	ARM926; EJ-S	1	312	?	—N/a	Integrated; 32/64 Mbit pSRAM up to 104 MHz	GSM850/EGSM900, DCS1800/PCS1900, GPRS class 12	2011	List: Alcatel 20.51X (SC6531C) Energizer Power Max P20 (SC6531) Logicom Le Posh 178 (SC6531E) Itel Muzik 110 (it2530) (SC6531E) Itel Muzik 400 Pro (it5095P) (SC6531E) Itel Signal 10 (King Signal in India) (it3010A) (SC6531E) Itel Super Guru 200 (SC6531E) Itel Super Guru 400 (SC6531E) Itel Super Guru 600 (India Only) (SC6531E) Itel it2192T Thermo Edition (SC6531E) Logicom Le Posh 180 (SC6531E) Micromax X380 (SC6531E) Micromax X419 (SC6531E) Nokia 105 (2019) (SC6531EFM) Nokia 110 (2019) (SC6531E) Nokia 6310 (2021) (SC6531F) Realme Dizo Star 300 (SC6531E) Realme Dizo Star 500 (SC6531E)
SC7701B	40 nm	ARM9	ARM926; EJ-S	1	460	32 KB L1 + 32 KB	—N/a	LPDDR	GSM, quad-band WCDMA, HSDPA	2013	List: Alcatel 20.38X CAT B30 Samsung GT-E3300i/09i Nokia 3310 3G
SC9820E	28 nm HPC+	ARMv8	ARM Cortex-A53	2	1300	?	Mali-T820 @384 MHz	LPDDR2 up to 533 MHz; LPDDR3 up to 667 MHz	GSM, WCDMA, TDD-LTE, FDD-LTE	2018	
SC7731EF	28 nm HPC+	ARMv7	ARM Cortex-A7	4	1300	?	Mali-T820 @600 MHz	LPDDR2/3 up to 533 MHz	GSM, EDGE, WCDMA, HSPA	?	List: Tecno T901
UIS8910FF	28 nm	ARMv7	ARM Cortex-A5	1	500	?	—N/a	up to 104 MHz pSRAM	GSM, GPRS, LTE Cat.1 Bis	?	
T107	22 nm	ARMv7	ARM Cortex-A7	1	1000	?	—N/a	LPDDR2	GSM, EDGE, WCDMA, HSPA, TDD-LTE, FDD-LTE	2021	HMD Barbie, Nokia 2660 Flip, HMD 2660 Flip, Nokia 3210 (2024), Itel Magic X 4G (it9210), Itel Magic X Play 4G, Itel Super Guru 4G (it9020)
T117	22 nm	ARMv7	ARM Cortex-A7	1	1000	?	—N/a	LPDDR2	GSM, EDGE, WCDMA, HSPA, TDD-LTE, FDD-LTE	2020	Alcatel 3080G, Alcatel 3082X, Itel Magic X Pro 4G, Nokia 215 4G, Nokia 225 4G (2020), Tecno T902 4G
T127	22 nm	ARMv7	ARM Cortex-A7	1	1000	?	?	LPDDR2	GSM, EDGE, WCDMA, HSPA, TDD-LTE, FDD-LTE	2024	Crosscall Core S5, Doro Leva X10, Hammer Boost 2 LTE, HMD 105 4G, Itel Neo R60+ 4G (it9310), Itel Super Guru 4G Max (it9310), Nokia 108 4G (2024)

== Android Headunit Radio processors ==
Model number	Fab	CPU (ARMv7)			GPU	NPU	RAM	Wireless radio technologies	Released	Utilizing devices
Model number	Fab	μarch	Cores	Freq. (GHz)	GPU	NPU	RAM	Wireless radio technologies	Released	Utilizing devices
UIS8581A	28 nm	4 + 4 cores (1.6 GHz Cortex-A55 + 1.2 GHz Cortex-A55)	8	1.6 x 4 1.2 x 4	PowerVR GE8322 @ 550 MHz	-	4, 6 or 8	Wi-Fi 802.11b/g/n, Bluetooth 4.2	2018	List: Eonon VWX and X-Series, Mekede TS18
UIS7862	12 nm	2 + 6 cores (2.0 GHz Cortex-A75 + 2.0 GHz Cortex-A55)	8	2.0 x 2 2.0 x 6	Mali-G52 MC2 (3EE) @ 850 MHz	0.5 TOPS	4, 6 or 8	Wi-Fi 802.11b/g/n/ac, Bluetooth 5.0	2020	List: FYT 7862, Teyes CC3, Mekede M6 Pro
UIS7870	6 nm	1 + 3 + 4 cores (2.7 GHz Cortex-A76 + 2.3 GHz Cortex-A76 + 2.1 GHz Cortex-A55)	8	2.7 x 1 2.3 x 3 2.1 x 4	Mali-G57 MC2 @ 850 MHz x 4	AX3596 8 TOPS	6, 8 or 12	Wi-Fi 802.11b/g/n/ac, Bluetooth 5.0	2024	List: FYT 7870, Mekede DUDU7, TS20

== 2G smartphone processors ==
Model number	Fab	CPU (ARMv7)				GPU	Memory technology	Wireless radio technologies	Released	Utilizing devices
Model number	Fab	μarch	Cores	Freq. (GHz)	Cache	GPU	Memory technology	Wireless radio technologies	Released	Utilizing devices
SC6815; SC6815A	40 nm	ARM Cortex-A7	1	1.2	L1: 32 KB + 32 KB, L2: 256 KB	Mali-400 MP1	Single- channel LPDDR2; 333 MHz	Wi-Fi 802.11b/g/n, Bluetooth 4.0, GSM850/GSM900, DCS1800/PCS1900, GPRS Class 12, GPS, FM	2012	List: Samsung Galaxy Star 2 Samsung Galaxy Star Advance
SC6820	40 nm	ARM Cortex-A5	1	1.0	?	Mali-400 MP1	SDR/DDR; SDRAM	Wi-Fi 802.11b/g/n, Bluetooth 4.0, GSM850/GSM900, DCS1800/PCS1900, GPRS Class 12, GPS, FM	2012	
SC6821	40 nm	ARM Cortex-A5	1	1.0	?	Mali-400 MP1	SDR/DDR; SDRAM	Wi-Fi 802.11b/g/n, Bluetooth 4.0, GSM850/GSM900, DCS1800/PCS1900, GPRS Class 12, GPS, FM	2014	List: Spice Fire One Mi-FX 1, Intex Cloud FX, Intex Aqua VX
SC6825	40 nm	ARM Cortex-A5	2	1.2	L1: 32 KB + 32 KB, L2: 256 KB	Mali-400 MP2	Single/dual- channel SDR/ LPDDR1/2	Wi-Fi 802.11b/g/n, Bluetooth 4.0, GSM850/GSM900, DCS1800/PCS1900, GPRS Class 12, GPS, FM	2012	List: Lenovo A318T, A376, A390T, A398T

== 3G smartphone and tablet processors ==
Model number	Fab	CPU (ARMv7)				GPU	Memory technology	Wireless radio technologies	Released	Utilizing devices
Model number	Fab	μarch	Cores	Freq. (GHz)	Cache	GPU	Memory technology	Wireless radio technologies	Released	Utilizing devices
SC5735A	?	ARM Cortex-A7	4	1.2	L1: 32 KB + 32 KB; L2: 512 KB	Mali-400 MP2	Dual-channel; LPDDR1/2 or DDR3	Wi-Fi, GPS, BT, FM, GSM, GPRS, EDGE Class 12, WCDMA, HSPA, HSDPA	2014	List: DEXP Ursus NS370, Texet X-Pad Hit 7 3G, Text Quad 7 3G
SC5735	?	ARM Cortex-A7	4	1.2	L1: 32 KB + 32 KB; L2: 512 KB	Mali-400 MP4	Dual-channel; LPDDR1/2 or DDR3	Wi-Fi, GPS, BT, FM, GSM, GPRS, EDGE Class 12, WCDMA, HSPA, HSDPA	2014	
SC7715	?	ARM Cortex-A7	1	1.2	L1: 32 KB + 32 KB; L2: 256 KB	Mali-400 MP1	Single-channel; LPDDR2; 333 MHz	GSM, GPRS, EDGE Class 12, WCDMA, HSPA, HSDPA	?	List: Celkon A402, Celkon A403, Intex Aqua V3, Intex Aqua V4, Micromax Bolt S300, Micromax Bolt S301, Micromax Bolt S302, QMobile Bold T50, QMobile Noir X2i, Samsung Galaxy Ace NXT Samsung Galaxy Pocket 2
SC7727S	28 nm HPm	ARM Cortex-A7	2	1.2	L1: 32 KB + 32 KB; L2: 256 KB	Mali-400 MP1	Single/dual- channel LPDDR2/3	Wi-Fi 802.11b/g/n, Bluetooth 2.1, GPS, FM, GSM, GPRS, EDGE Class 12, WCDMA, HSPA+, HSDPA	?	List: Samsung Z1, Samsung J120H
SC7730A	?	ARM Cortex-A7	4	1.2	L1: 32 KB + 32 KB; L2: 512 KB	Mali-400 MP2	Single/dual- channel LPDDR1/2/3	Wi-Fi 802.11b/g/n, Bluetooth 4.0, GPS, GSM, GPRS, EDGE Class 12, WCDMA, HSPA+, HSDPA	?	List: Lenovo A1900(?)
SC7730S	28 nm HPm	ARM Cortex-A7	4	1.3	L1: 32 KB + 32 KB; L2: 512 KB	Mali-400 MP2	Single/dual- channel LPDDR1/2/3	Wi-Fi 802.11b/g/n, Bluetooth 4.0, GPS, FM, GSM, GPRS, EDGE Class 12, WCDMA, HSPA+, HSDPA, HSUPA	?	List: Samsung Z3, Samsung Galaxy Tab E Wifi (SM-T560) and 3G (SM-T561), Cherry Mobile Flare Y series (Flare Y3 mini), MyPhone my series (myA11i), BLU Advance L4, BLU C4
SC7731C	28 nm HPm	ARM Cortex-A7	4	1.2	L1: 32 KB + 32 KB; L2: 512 KB	Mali-400 MP1	Single/dual- channel LPDDR1/2/3	Wi-Fi 802.11b/g/n, Bluetooth 4.0, GPS, FM, GSM, GPRS, EDGE Class 12, WCDMA, HSDPA, HSUPA	2014	List: Cherry Mobile Omega Lite (2, 3 and 3c), Cherry Mobile Ace series (Ace 2 and Ace 3), Cherry Mobile Astro series (Astro 2 and Astro 3), Cherry Mobile Spin series (Spin TV, Spin 2 and Spin 3), Flare Lite series (Quad, 2, 2s, 3, 3s and 4), Flare Lite DTV, Cherry Mobile Flare J series (Flare J1, Flare J1 Plus, Flare J1 mini, Flare J1s, Flare J1 2017, Flare J2 DTV, Flare J2 Lite and Flare J2 mini), Cherry Mobile Flare P series (Flare P1 Lite and Flare P1 mini) and Flare S series (Flare S3 mini, Flare S4 mini, Flare S5 mini, Flare S5 mini DTV and Flare S6 mini), Cherry Mobile Rover 2, Intex Aqua 3G Pro Q, Intex Aqua Viturbo, Itel A11, Itel A12, Itel A13, Itel A51, Itel P11, Itel P12, Itel it1409, Itel it1508 Plus, Itel it1513, Itel it1516 Plus, Itel it1556 Plus, Micromax Bolt Q357, QMobile i7i Pro, QMobile i8i Pro, QMobile Noir W50, QMobile Q Infinity B, QMobile Q Infinity C, QMobile X32 Power, QMobile X36, Karbonn Alfa A18, Karbonn Titanium Moghul, Karbonn Titanium S35, MyPhone my series (my28, my28s, my28s DTV, my73, my 81, my82, my82 DTV, myA3 and myX1), Firefly Mobile Sweet and Sweet Plus, Starmobile Play Five, BLU Advance 4.0 L2, BLU Advance 4.0 L3
SC7731G	28 nm HPm	ARM Cortex-A7	4	1.3	L1: 32 KB + 32 KB; L2: 512 KB	Mali-400 MP2	Single/dual- channel LPDDR1/2/3	Wi-Fi 802.11b/g/n, Bluetooth 4.0, GPS, FM, GSM, GPRS, EDGE Class 12, WCDMA, HSDPA, HSUPA	2014	List: Archos 40 Access, Archos 45D Platinum, Archos 50C Neon, Archos 50D Neon, Archos Junior Phone, Archos 40d Titanium, Celkon 2 GB Star, Celkon 2 GB Xpress, Celkon Q3K Power, Intex Aqua Q7N, Intex Aqua Q7N Pro, Micromax Bolt Q3001, Jinga A400, Jinga A502, Karbonn A7 Turbo, Kazam Trooper 451, Huawei Honor Bee (Huawei Y5c), Itel it1408, Itel it1505 Vision, Itel it1550 Vision Plus, SENWA Colossus S6000, Lava A48, Lava A50, Lava A502, Lava A51, Lava A55, Lava A59, Lava A67, Lava A68, Lava A73, Lava A79, Lava A82, BLU Advance 4.0 L3, BLU Advance 4.0M
SC7731E	28 nm HPm	ARM Cortex-A7	4	1.3	L1: 32 KB + 32 KB; L2: 512 KB	Mali-T820 MP1 @600 MHz	LPDDR2/3 @ 533 MHz	Wi-Fi 802.11b/g/n, Bluetooth 4.2, GPS, FM, GSM, GPRS, EDGE Class 12, TD-SCDMA, HSPA+, WCDMA, HSPA(+)	2018	List: Cherry Mobile Flare J series (Flare J1 Lite, Flare J3 mini), Cherry Mobile Flare S series (Flare S7 mini), Cherry Mobile Flare Tab, Cherry Mobile Flare Y series (Flare Y3s), Cherry Mobile Superion S1 DTV, MyPhone my series (myA1 plus, myA17, myA18, myG1, myNX1, myP1), Blu C series (C5 2018, C5 2019 and C5 Plus), Blu Advance series (L5 and A4 2019), Blu J series (J2, J4 and J6), Blu Studio X8 HD, BQ-4001G Cool, BQ-5002G Fun, Multilaser E and E Lite, Multilaser F, Nokia C1, Advan Tab X7 Pro, Itel A06, Itel A14, Itel A14 Max, Itel A14 Plus, Itel A16, Itel A16 Plus, Itel A17, Itel A18, Itel A33, Itel A33 Plus, Itel A35, Itel A36, Itel A37, Itel A56, Itel A56 Pro, Itel A57, Itel Alpha, Itel Alpha Lite, Itel KidPad 1, Itel P15, Itel P17, Itel P17 Pro (3G-Only), Itel P36, Itel P37, Itel P38, Itel P38 Pro (3G-Only), Itel PrimeTab 1, Itel A58 Lite, Itel A58 Pro (3G-Only), Itel A58, Itel P33, Itel P33 Plus, Itel S15, Itel S16, Itel S16 Pro (3G-Only), Itel S17, Cubot J10, Ulefone Note 6, Wiko Y51, Prestigio WIZE 4118 3G, Prestigio SmartKids BQ-5016G Choice, Tecno Pop 5C, TP-Link Neffos A5, BQ-5518G Jeans, Wiko Y50, Wiko Jerry 4, DEXP A240, Prestigio Muze J5, Fly Life Geo, Digma Plane 8595 3G, DEXP Plane 7594 3G, Wiko Y70, BQ-7098G Armor, Symphony V141 Irbis SP542, Symphony i18, Digma Optima 8027 3G, DEXP Ursus S180, DEXP Ursus VA110, Nokia C1 2nd Edition, Nokia C10, ZTE Blade L8
SC7735S	40 nm	ARM Cortex-A7	4	1.2	L1: 32 KB + 32 KB; L2: 512 KB	Mali-400 MP4	Single/dual- channel LPDDR1/2/3	Wi-Fi 802.11b/g/n, Bluetooth 4.0, GPS, GSM, GPRS, EDGE Class 12, WCDMA, HSPA+, HSDPA	?	List: Samsung Galaxy Core 2 (SM-G355H), HTC Desire 700
SC8735S	?	ARM Cortex-A7	4	1.2	L1: 32 KB + 32 KB; L2: 512 KB	Mali-400 MP4	Single/dual- channel LPDDR1/2/3	Wi-Fi 802.11b/g/n, Bluetooth 4.0, GPS, FM, GSM, GPRS, EDGE, TD-SCDMA, HSPA+, WCDMA, HSPA(+)	?	
SC8810	40 nm	ARM Cortex-A5	1	1.0	?	Mali-400	Single/dual-channel DDR1	Wi-Fi 802.11b/g/n, Bluetooth 4.0, GPS, FM, GSM, GPRS Class 12, EDGE, TD-SCDMA, TD-HSPA	?	List: Samsung Galaxy Young 2 (SM-G130), Samsung Galaxy Star (GT-S5282) 2014
SC8825	?	ARM Cortex-A5	2	1.2	L1: 32 KB + 32 KB	Mali-400 MP2	Single/dual- channel LPDDR1/2	GSM, GPRS, EDGE, TD-SCDMA, HSDPA, HSUPA, HSPA+	?	List: Lenovo A390t
SC8830; SC8830A	28 nm HPm	ARM Cortex-A7	4	1.2	L1: 32 KB + 32 KB; L2: 512 KB	Mali-400 MP2	Single/dual- channel LPDDR1/2/3	Wi-Fi 802.11b/g/n, Bluetooth 4.0, GPS, FM, GSM, GPRS, EDGE, TD-SCDMA, HSPA+	?	List: Samsung J2 Pro (2016), A398T+, A238t, Samsung Tab 3 Lite VE (SM-T113), Samsung Galaxy Tab E (SM-T561), Samsung Galaxy Grand Neo Plus (GT-I9060I), Selecline 870712/MID5016, Senseit A109, Intex Aqua Joy, Karbonn A41 Power
SC8831G	28 nm HPm	ARM Cortex-A7	4	1.4	L1: 32 KB + 32 KB; L2: 512 KB	Mali-400 MP2	Single/dual- channel LPDDR1/2/3	Wi-Fi 802.11b/g/n, Bluetooth 4.0, GPS, FM, GSM, GPRS, EDGE, TD-SCDMA, HSPA+	?	
SC8835S	28 nm HPm	ARM Cortex-A7	4	1.2	L1: 32 KB + 32 KB; L2: 512 KB	Mali-400 MP4	Single/dual- channel LPDDR1/2/3	Wi-Fi 802.11b/g/n, Bluetooth 4.0, GPS, FM, GSM, GPRS, EDGE, TD-SCDMA, HSPA+	?	

== 4G smartphone and tablet processors ==
Model Number	Fab	CPU				GPU	Memory technology	Wireless radio technologies	Released	Utilizing devices
Model Number	Fab	ISA	μarch	Cores	Freq. (GHz)	GPU	Memory technology	Wireless radio technologies	Released	Utilizing devices
SC9830A	28 nm HPm	ARMv7-A	ARM Cortex-A7	4	1.5	Mali-400 MP2 @ 512 MHz	Single/dual-channel LPDDR1/2/3	GSM Multi-Mode, WCDMA/TD-SCDMA/LTE, Bluetooth 4.0, WiFi 802.11b/g/n, GPS, FM	?	List: LYF Flame 7, LYF Flame 7s, Philips S326, Xolo Era 4G
SC9830	28 nm HPm	ARMv7-A	ARM Cortex-A7	4	1.2	Mali-400 MP2	Single/dual-channel LPDDR1/2/3	GSM Multi-Mode, WCDMA/TD-SCDMA/LTE, Bluetooth 4.0, WiFi 802.11b/g/n, GPS, FM	Q4 2015	List: Samsung Z2, Samsung Galaxy J1 mini Prime, Samsung Galaxy J3 (2016)
SC9832A	28 nm HPm	ARMv7-A	ARM Cortex-A7	4	1.3	Mali-400 MP2 @ 512 MHz	Single/dual-channel LPDDR1/2/3	GSM Multi-Mode, WCDMA/TD-SCDMA/LTE, Bluetooth 4.0, WiFi 802.11b/g/n, GPS, FM	2016	List: Archos Access 40, Coolpad Mega 4A, Coolpad TipTop N2M, Doov V15, Micromax Bharat 2, Micromax Bharat 2 Plus, Micromax Bharat 2 Ultra, Micromax Q4151, Intex Aqua A4, Intex Aqua Amaze+, Intex Aqua Lions 4G, Intex Aqua Lions E3, Intex Aqua Lions T1 Lite VR, Intex Aqua Pro 4G, Intex Aqua Craze 2, Intex Aqua S3, Intex Aqua Selfie, Intex Aqua Strong, Intex Aqua Style III, Intex Cloud C1, Spice F305, InFocus A1, InFocus A2, itel A20, itel A40, itel A42 Plus, itel PowerPro P41, itel Wish A21, iVooMi V5, I Kall K2, I Kall K3, Voto V2, Voto V2i, Karbonn Smart K9 Yuva, Karbonn Smart K9 Grand, Swipe Konnect Power, Lenovo K320t, Leagoo Z7, Xolo Era 1X, Xolo Era 1X Pro, Xolo Era 2, QMobile LT100, QMobile LT550, MyPhone my29s, Evercoss Xtream 1, Evercoss Xtream 1 Pro
SC9850	28 nm HPm	ARMv7-A	ARM Cortex-A7	4	1.3	Mali-T820 MP1	Single/dual-channel LPDDR3/4	GSM Multi-Mode, WCDMA/TD-SCDMA/LTE, Bluetooth 4.0, WiFi 802.11b/g/n, GPS, FM	2018	List: Cherry Mobile Doov V31, Flare A1 Roam, Evercoss Xtream 2 Pro, Maxwest Gravity 5 GO
SC9850K	28 nm HPm	ARMv7-A	ARM Cortex-A7	4	1.3	Mali-T820 MP1	Single/dual-channel LPDDR3/4	GSM Multi-Mode, WCDMA/TD-SCDMA/LTE, Bluetooth 4.0, WiFi 802.11b/g/n, GPS, FM	2018	List: Advan i7U, Advan S5E Full View, Archos Alba 6, Coolpad Mega 5A, Coolpad N3C, Evercoss Xtream 1 Plus, Evercoss Xtream 1 Prime, Intex Elyt Dual, Lenovo K320t, SPC L53 Selfie, Symphony Roar V150, True Smart 4G GEN C 5.5, Ziox Duopix F9 Pro
SC9832E	28 nm HPm	ARMv8-A	ARM Cortex-A53	4	1.4	Mali-T820 MP1 @ 680 MHz (10.8 GFLOPS in FP32)	LPDDR2 @ 533 MHz; LPDDR3 @ 666 MHz	GSM Multi-Mode, WCDMA/TD-SCDMA/LTE, Bluetooth 4.0, WiFi 802.11b/g/n, GPS, FM	2018	List: Advan G5 Elite, Advan NASA, Advan NASA Plus, Advan NASA Pro, Advan S5E, Advan Tablet Belajar 7, Starmobile Play Click LTE, Micromax Bharat 4 Diwali Edition, Micromax Spark Go, Meizu C9 Pro, Archos Access 57 and 50 S, MyPhone myXI1 Plus, Inoi 2, HTC Wildfire E Star, Nokia C2, Samsung Galaxy J2 Core 2020, Cherry Mobile Flare Y5, Cherry Mobile Flare S8 Mini, Evercoss Xtream 1 Mini, Evercoss Xtream 2, itel A23, itel A23 Pro, itel A23S, itel A25, itel A25 Pro, itel A26, itel A27, itel A44 Air, itel A44 Power, itel A47, itel A48, itel A49, itel A58 Pro (4G-Only), itel A60, itel P17 Pro (4G-Only), itel Vision 1 Pro, Tecno Pop 5X, Tecno Pop 5S, Lava Z40, Wiko Y52, BLU C5L 2020, BLU C5L Plus, ZTE Blade A3 (2019), ZTE Blade A31 Lite
SC9860	16 nm FFC	ARMv8-A	ARM Cortex-A53	8	2.0	Mali-T880 MP4		GSM Multi-Mode, WCDMA/TD-SCDMA/LTE, Bluetooth 4.0, WiFi 802.11b/g/n, GPS, FM	?	List: itel Wish A41, itel Wish A41 Plus
SC9860GV	16 nm FFC	ARMv8-A	ARM Cortex-A53	4 + 4	2.0 + 1.25	Mali-T880 MP4		TD-LTE / FDD LTE / TD-SCDMA / WCDMA / EGG LTE Category 7 (DL:300 Mbit/s., UL:100 Mbit/s)	?	
SC9863	28 nm HPC+	ARMv8-A	ARM Cortex-A55	8	1.6 + 1.2	PowerVR GE8322 @ 550 MHz		LTE Cat 7 (TDD-LTE / FDD-LTE / TD-SCDMA / WCDMA / EGG)	Q1 2019	List: Coolpad Cool 3, Blackview Tab 8E
SC9863A	28 nm HPC+	ARMv8-A	ARM Cortex-A55	8	1.6 + 1.2	PowerVR GE8322 @ 550 MHz	LPDDR3/4/4X @ 933 MHz	LTE Cat 7 (TDD-LTE / FDD-LTE / TD-SCDMA / WCDMA / EGG)	Q4 2019	List: BLU Vivo XL5, BLU Vivo X6, BLU G5, BLU G6, BLU G8, BLU G50 Mega, Gionee F8 Neo, Gionee F9, Gionee F9 Plus, Gionee F10, Gionee F11, Gionee Max, Gionee Max Pro, Alcatel 1V, Alcatel 1S, Alcatel 1SE, Alcatel 3 (2025), Alcatel A31 Prime, Gigaset GS110 and GS195, Advan G3 Pro, Advan Tab Sketsa, Advan Tab 8 Belajar, Advan G5, Advan G9, Advan G9 Perfecto, Advan G9 Plus, Advan G9 Pro, Advan i6C, Alcatel A11, BLU C9, BLU G35, BLU G44, BLU G44+, BLU G51S, BLU G51 Plus, BLU G52L, BLU G71L, BLU J12, BLU K2, Cubot A1, Dcode Cygnal, Evercoss Terra S6, Evercoss M6A, Evercoss M6, Evercoss Xtream 2 Plus, Evercoss Xtream 2 Prime, Flipkart MarQ M3 Smart, HiSense H30 Lite, HiSense V5, HTC Wildfire E, Wiko View 3 Lite, Wiko T20, Wiko Y80, Archos Oxygen 57, Archos Oxygen 63, Doogee N10, Haier I6 Infinity, Panasonic Eluga U3, Cherry Mobile Flare S8 Deluxe, Cherry Mobile Flare Tab Pro, MyPhone my series (myX12 and myXI1 Pro), Teclast P10S/P10HD/P20HD, Teclast P80X, Multilaser G series (G, G Max and G Pro), itel A05s, itel Aura 05i, itel A46, itel A49 Play, itel A60s, itel P36 Play, itel P36 Pro LTE, itel P37 Pro, itel P38 Pro (4G-Only), itel P40, itel Pad 1, itel S15 Pro, itel S16 Pro (4G-Only), itel S18, itel Vision 1, itel Vision 1 Plus, itel Vision 2, itel Vision 2 Plus, itel Vision 2s, itel Vision 3, itel Vision 3 Turbo, itel Vision 5, Karbonn X21, Lenovo A7, Lenovo K13, Lava Bold N1 (4G-Only), Lava Z61 Pro, Lava Smart 4, Lava Smart 4 Plus, Lava Yuva Smart, Lava Yuva Smart 2, Lava Yuva Star, Lava Yuva Star 2, LG W10 Alpha, Samsung Galaxy A03 Core, Realme C11 (2021), Realme Narzo 50i, Realme C30s, Infinix Smart 5 Pro, Infinix Smart 6, Infinix Smart 7 (India Only), Infinix Smart 7 HD, Infinix Smart 7 Plus, Micromax iOne, Nokia C3, Nokia C01 Plus, Nokia C12, Nokia C12 Pro, Nokia C20, Nokia C20 Plus, Nokia C21, Nokia C21 Plus, Nokia C22, Nokia C30, Nokia C31, Nokia C32, Tecno Pop 5 LTE, Tecno Pop 7, Motorola Moto E6i, Motorola Moto E7i Power, Ulefone Note 6P, Ulefone Note 10, Ulefone Note 12P, Ulefone Tab 7, Ulefone Tab A7, Umidigi G9A, LG W10 Alpha, LG W20, Blackview A70, Blackview BV4900S, Blackview BV6600E, Blackview Tab 8, Blackview Tab 12, Blackview Oscal Flat 3C Mini, Blackview Wave 2C, TCL L10 Pro, Coolpad Cool 10A, Coolpad CP12, Coolpad CP12 Neo, Coolpad CP12 Neo+, Walton Primo GM4, Walton Primo H8 Pro, Walton Primo H9, Walton Primo HM6, Walton Primo R6 Max, Walton Primo EF10, Yezz Art 2 Pro, ZTE Blade A5 (2019 & 2020), ZTE Blade A7S (2020), ZTE Blade A31, ZTE Blade A31 Plus, ZTE Blade A51, ZTE Blade A52, ZTE Blade A71, ZTE Blade A72, ZTE Blade V10 Vita
SC9853I	14 nm FF	x86-64	Intel Airmont	8	1.8	Mali-T820 MP2		LTE Cat 7 (TDD-LTE / FDD-LTE / TD-SCDMA / WCDMA / EGG)	2017	List: Leagoo T5C
SC9861G-IA	14 nm FF	x86-64	Intel Airmont	8	2.0	PowerVR GT7200		LTE Cat 7 (TDD-LTE / FDD-LTE / TD-SCDMA / WCDMA / EGG)	Q2 2017	
Tiger T310	12 nm FF TSMC	ARMv8.2-A	ARM Cortex-A75	1	2.0	PowerVR GE8300 @ 800 MHz (25.6 GFLOPS in FP32)	LPDDR3 @ 933 MHz; LPDDR4/LPDDR4X @ 1333 MHz	(TDD-LTE / FDD-LTE / TD-SCDMA / WCDMA / CDMA / GSM)	Q2 2019	List: Hisense F30S, Advan Sketsa 2, Meizu M10, Meizu M10s, UMIDIGI A11s, UMIDIGI A13S, UMIDIGI Bison X10G, UMIDIGI X10S, BlackView A50, UMIDIGI Power 5s, UMIDIGI Power 7s, Blackview Tab 6, BlackView Tab 7, BlackView A70 Pro, DEXP A555, BQ-5765L BQ-6868L, BLU G34, BLU G40, Oukitel C25, Cubot KingKong 6, Cubot Pocket, Philips PH1, Philips PH2, Ulefone Note 10P, Ulefone Note 12 Dooge S35T
Tiger T310	12 nm FF TSMC	ARMv8.2-A	ARM Cortex-A55	3	1.8	PowerVR GE8300 @ 800 MHz (25.6 GFLOPS in FP32)	LPDDR3 @ 933 MHz; LPDDR4/LPDDR4X @ 1333 MHz	(TDD-LTE / FDD-LTE / TD-SCDMA / WCDMA / CDMA / GSM)	Q2 2019	List: Hisense F30S, Advan Sketsa 2, Meizu M10, Meizu M10s, UMIDIGI A11s, UMIDIGI A13S, UMIDIGI Bison X10G, UMIDIGI X10S, BlackView A50, UMIDIGI Power 5s, UMIDIGI Power 7s, Blackview Tab 6, BlackView Tab 7, BlackView A70 Pro, DEXP A555, BQ-5765L BQ-6868L, BLU G34, BLU G40, Oukitel C25, Cubot KingKong 6, Cubot Pocket, Philips PH1, Philips PH2, Ulefone Note 10P, Ulefone Note 12 Dooge S35T
Tiger T603 / T7100	28 nm	ARMv8.2-A	ARM Cortex-A75 ARM Cortex-A55	2 6	1.8 1.2	PowerVR GE8322	LPDDR4/LPDDR4X	LTE (TDD-LTE / FDD-LTE / WCDMA / CDMA / GSM)	Q4 2023	List: BlackView Flat 2C, BlackView Wave 9C, Itel A50, Itel A50C, Itel A50C Special Edition, Itel A70, Itel A70 Pro, Itel A80, Itel A90, Itel A90 Special Edition (Limited Edition in India), Itel A100C, Itel A100 (India), Itel A100C Special Edition (A100 Pro in India), Itel A300C, Itel Zeno 300, Itel Zeno 10, Itel Zeno 20, Itel Zeno 20 Max, Itel Zeno 100, Itel Zeno 100 Lite, Itel Zeno 100 Pro, Ulefone Note 22, Xiaomi Redmi A3x
Tiger T606 / T7200 (UMS9230)	TSMC 12 nm FF	ARMv8.2-A	ARM Cortex-A75	2	1.6	Mali-G57 MC1 @ 650 MHz (41.6 GFLOPS in FP32)	LPDDR4X @ 1600 MHz	(TDD-LTE / FDD-LTE / TD-SCDMA / WCDMA / CDMA / GSM)	Q3 2021	List: Motorola Moto E20, Samsung Galaxy A03, Oukitel OT5S, Oukitel OT11, Oukitel C59, Oukitel C59 Pro, Oukitel C60, Oukitel C60 Pro, HTC A101 Plus, HTC A104, HTC Wildfire E4 Plus, Blackview Oscal C70, Blackview Oscal Pad 16, Blackview Tab 60, Jolla C2, Alcatel A62, Umidigi A15C, Umidigi G5, Umidigi G5 Mecha, Tecno Spark 8C, Tecno Spark 10C, Coolpad C16, Cubot A10, Cubot A40, BLU G64, BLU G64L, Nokia G11, Nokia G11 Plus, Nokia G21, Nokia G22, Philips S6206, Philips S6310 Essence 20, Infinix Hot 30i (13 MP-Only), Infinix Smart 8 (Global), Infinix Smart 8 HD, Infinix Smart 10 HD, itel P40+, itel P55 (4G-Only), itel P55+, itel P55T, itel P65C, itel Pad 2, itel S18 Pro, itel S23, itel Vision 3 Plus, itel Vision 5 Plus, itel VistaTab 10, itel VistaTab 30, Lava O3 Pro, Lava Yuva 3, Luna V6, ZTE Blade V40 Vita
Tiger T606 / T7200 (UMS9230)	TSMC 12 nm FF	ARMv8.2-A	ARM Cortex-A55	6	1.6	Mali-G57 MC1 @ 650 MHz (41.6 GFLOPS in FP32)	LPDDR4X @ 1600 MHz	(TDD-LTE / FDD-LTE / TD-SCDMA / WCDMA / CDMA / GSM)	Q3 2021	
Tiger T610 (UMS512)	TSMC 12 nm FF	ARMv8.2-A	ARM Cortex-A75	2	1.8	Mali-G52 MC2 (3EE) @ 614.4 MHz (58.9 GFLOPS in FP32)	LPDDR3 @ 933 MHz; LPDDR4/LPDDR4X @ 1600 MHz	(TDD-LTE / FDD-LTE / TD-SCDMA / WCDMA / CDMA / GSM)	Q4 2019	List: Acer Sospiro A52 Ultra, Acer Sospiro AX85, Blackview Tab 9, Hisense A5 CC, Hisense Q5, Honor Play 20, Honor Play 20C, Honor Play 5T, Infinix Hot 11 (2022), Infinix Hot 12 Play (NFC-Only), Realme C21Y, Realme C25Y, Micromax IN 2B, Nokia T20, Blackview Tab 9
Tiger T610 (UMS512)	TSMC 12 nm FF	ARMv8.2-A	ARM Cortex-A55	6	1.8	Mali-G52 MC2 (3EE) @ 614.4 MHz (58.9 GFLOPS in FP32)	LPDDR3 @ 933 MHz; LPDDR4/LPDDR4X @ 1600 MHz	(TDD-LTE / FDD-LTE / TD-SCDMA / WCDMA / CDMA / GSM)	Q4 2019	List: Acer Sospiro A52 Ultra, Acer Sospiro AX85, Blackview Tab 9, Hisense A5 CC, Hisense Q5, Honor Play 20, Honor Play 20C, Honor Play 5T, Infinix Hot 11 (2022), Infinix Hot 12 Play (NFC-Only), Realme C21Y, Realme C25Y, Micromax IN 2B, Nokia T20, Blackview Tab 9
Tiger T612 / T7225 (UMS9230H)	TSMC 12 nm FF	ARMv8.2-A	ARM Cortex-A75	2	1.8	Mali-G57 MC1 @ 650 MHz (41.6 GFLOPS in FP32)	LPDDR3 @ 933 MHz; LPDDR4/LPDDR4X @ 1866 MHz	(TDD-LTE / FDD-LTE / TD-SCDMA / WCDMA / CDMA / GSM)	Q1 2022	List: Realme C30, Realme C31, Realme C33, Realme Narzo 50A Prime, Realme Narzo 50i Prime, Realme Narzo N53, Realme C53
Tiger T612 / T7225 (UMS9230H)	TSMC 12 nm FF	ARMv8.2-A	ARM Cortex-A55	6	1.8	Mali-G57 MC1 @ 650 MHz (41.6 GFLOPS in FP32)	LPDDR3 @ 933 MHz; LPDDR4/LPDDR4X @ 1866 MHz	(TDD-LTE / FDD-LTE / TD-SCDMA / WCDMA / CDMA / GSM)	Q1 2022	List: Realme C30, Realme C31, Realme C33, Realme Narzo 50A Prime, Realme Narzo 50i Prime, Realme Narzo N53, Realme C53
Tiger T615 / T7250 (UMS9230E)	TSMC 12 nm FF	ARMv8.2-A	ARM Cortex-A75	2	1.8	Mali-G57 MP1 @ 850 MHz (54.4 GFLOPS in FP32)	LPDDR3 @ 933 MHz; LPDDR4/LPDDR4X @ 1866 MHz	(TDD-LTE / FDD-LTE / TD-SCDMA / WCDMA / CDMA / GSM)	Q3 2024	List: Blackview Wave 3, BLU G45, Cubot Note 60, Dcode Bold 3 Pro, HMD Luma, Infinix Smart 10, Infinix Smart 10 Plus, Infinix Smart 20e, Infinix Smart 20 HD, Itel A100 (Global), Itel A200 (Zeno 200 in India), Itel A200s, Itel A200+, Itel A200+s, Itel P65, Itel Power 80, Itel City 100, Itel City 200, Itel City 200s, Itel VistaTab 11, Itel VistaTab Go, Realme C100i (India), Realme C100i (Global), Realme C100x, Realme P4s Lite, Xiaomi Poco C71, Xiaomi Poco C81, Xiaomi Poco C81x, Xiaomi Poco C81 Pro, Oppo A6c (Global), Oppo K14 Lite, OnePlus N6 Lite, Oukitel C62 GT, Oukitel C72, Tecno Pop X (4G-Only), Tecno Spark Go 1, Tecno Spark Go 2, Tecno Spark Go 3, Tecno Spark Go 3 Pro, VGO TEL Smart 9 Pro, VGO TEL Smart 12, VGO TEL Smart 13, Xiaomi Redmi A5, Xiaomi Redmi A7 Pro (4G-Only), ZTE A37e
Tiger T615 / T7250 (UMS9230E)	TSMC 12 nm FF	ARMv8.2-A	ARM Cortex-A55	6	1.6	Mali-G57 MP1 @ 850 MHz (54.4 GFLOPS in FP32)	LPDDR3 @ 933 MHz; LPDDR4/LPDDR4X @ 1866 MHz	(TDD-LTE / FDD-LTE / TD-SCDMA / WCDMA / CDMA / GSM)	Q3 2024	
Tiger T616 / T7255 (UMS9230T)	TSMC 12 nm FF	ARMv8.2-A	ARM Cortex-A75	2	2.0	Mali-G57 MC1 @ 750 MHz (48 GFLOPS in FP32)	LPDDR4X @ 1866 MHz	(TDD-LTE / FDD-LTE / TD-SCDMA / WCDMA / CDMA / GSM)	Q3 2021	List: BlackView Color 8, BlackView Oscal Modern 8, BLU Bold K30, Coolpad Cool 50, Coolpad CP12S, Coolpad Fengshang 50, Coolpad Fengshang 50 Lite, Cubot A30, Infinix Hot 20 Pro, Itel S23+, Realme C35, Realme Pad Mini, Ulefone RugKing, ZTE Blade V40 Design
Tiger T616 / T7255 (UMS9230T)	TSMC 12 nm FF	ARMv8.2-A	ARM Cortex-A55	6	1.8	Mali-G57 MC1 @ 750 MHz (48 GFLOPS in FP32)	LPDDR4X @ 1866 MHz	(TDD-LTE / FDD-LTE / TD-SCDMA / WCDMA / CDMA / GSM)	Q3 2021	List: BlackView Color 8, BlackView Oscal Modern 8, BLU Bold K30, Coolpad Cool 50, Coolpad CP12S, Coolpad Fengshang 50, Coolpad Fengshang 50 Lite, Cubot A30, Infinix Hot 20 Pro, Itel S23+, Realme C35, Realme Pad Mini, Ulefone RugKing, ZTE Blade V40 Design
Tiger T618 (UMS512T)	TSMC 12 nm FF	ARMv8.2-A	ARM Cortex-A75	2	2.0	Mali-G52 MC2 (3EE) @ 850 MHz (81.6 GFLOPS in FP32)	Dual-channel LPDDR3 @ 933 MHz; LPDDR4/LPDDR4X @ 1866 MHz	(TDD-LTE / FDD-LTE / TD-SCDMA / WCDMA / CDMA / GSM)	Q3 2019	List: Alldocube iPlay 40, Cubot TAB 30, Teclast M40, Teclast T40 Plus, ZTE Blade V30, ZTE Blade V40s, ZTE Blade V40 Pro, ZTE Axon 20 4G, ZTE Axon 40 SE, Samsung Galaxy Tab A8, Advan GX, Advan VX, Blackview Tab 11
Tiger T618 (UMS512T)	TSMC 12 nm FF	ARMv8.2-A	ARM Cortex-A55	6	2.0	Mali-G52 MC2 (3EE) @ 850 MHz (81.6 GFLOPS in FP32)	Dual-channel LPDDR3 @ 933 MHz; LPDDR4/LPDDR4X @ 1866 MHz	(TDD-LTE / FDD-LTE / TD-SCDMA / WCDMA / CDMA / GSM)	Q3 2019	List: Alldocube iPlay 40, Cubot TAB 30, Teclast M40, Teclast T40 Plus, ZTE Blade V30, ZTE Blade V40s, ZTE Blade V40 Pro, ZTE Axon 20 4G, ZTE Axon 40 SE, Samsung Galaxy Tab A8, Advan GX, Advan VX, Blackview Tab 11
Tiger T619	TSMC 12 nm FF	ARMv8.2-A	ARM Cortex-A75	2	2.2	Mali-G57 MC1 @ 850 MHz (54.4 GFLOPS in FP32)	LPDDR4X @ 1866 MHz	(TDD-LTE / FDD-LTE / TD-SCDMA / WCDMA / CDMA / GSM)	Q3 2023	List: Hotwav Cyber 13 Pro
Tiger T619	TSMC 12 nm FF	ARMv8.2-A	ARM Cortex-A55	6	1.8	Mali-G57 MC1 @ 850 MHz (54.4 GFLOPS in FP32)	LPDDR4X @ 1866 MHz	(TDD-LTE / FDD-LTE / TD-SCDMA / WCDMA / CDMA / GSM)	Q3 2023	List: Hotwav Cyber 13 Pro
Tiger T620 / T7280 (UMS9230S)	TSMC 12 nm FF	ARMv8.2-A	ARM Cortex-A75	2	2.2	Mali-G57 MC1 @ 850 MHz (54.4 GFLOPS in FP32)	LPDDR4X @ 1866 MHz	(TDD-LTE / FDD-LTE / TD-SCDMA / WCDMA / CDMA / GSM)	Q3 2024	List: Doogee M30 Pro, Itel S25, Itel S25 Ultra, Cubot A50
Tiger T620 / T7280 (UMS9230S)	TSMC 12 nm FF	ARMv8.2-A	ARM Cortex-A55	6	1.8	Mali-G57 MC1 @ 850 MHz (54.4 GFLOPS in FP32)	LPDDR4X @ 1866 MHz	(TDD-LTE / FDD-LTE / TD-SCDMA / WCDMA / CDMA / GSM)	Q3 2024	List: Doogee M30 Pro, Itel S25, Itel S25 Ultra, Cubot A50
T7300	6 nm (TSMC N6)	ARMv8.2-A	ARM Cortex-A78	2	2.2	Mali-G57 MC2 @ 950 MHz (54.4 GFLOPS in FP32)	LPDDR4X @ 2133 MHz	(TDD-LTE / FDD-LTE / TD-SCDMA / WCDMA / CDMA / GSM)	Q3 2024	List: Blackview Zeno 6, Itel Super 26 Ultra, Ulefone Tab A12 Pro, Vivo Y32 (2026)
T7300	6 nm (TSMC N6)	ARMv8.2-A	ARM Cortex-A55	6	2.0	Mali-G57 MC2 @ 950 MHz (54.4 GFLOPS in FP32)	LPDDR4X @ 2133 MHz	(TDD-LTE / FDD-LTE / TD-SCDMA / WCDMA / CDMA / GSM)	Q3 2024	List: Blackview Zeno 6, Itel Super 26 Ultra, Ulefone Tab A12 Pro, Vivo Y32 (2026)
Tiger T700	12 nm FF TSMC	ARMv8.2-A	ARM Cortex-A75	2	1.8	Mali-G52 MC2 @ 850 MHz (81.6 GFLOPS in FP32)	LPDDR4X @ 1866 MHz	(TDD-LTE / FDD-LTE / TD-SCDMA / WCDMA / CDMA / GSM)	Q1 2021	List: Motorola Moto G20, Motorola E40
Tiger T700	12 nm FF TSMC	ARMv8.2-A	ARM Cortex-A55	6	1.8	Mali-G52 MC2 @ 850 MHz (81.6 GFLOPS in FP32)	LPDDR4X @ 1866 MHz	(TDD-LTE / FDD-LTE / TD-SCDMA / WCDMA / CDMA / GSM)	Q1 2021	List: Motorola Moto G20, Motorola E40
Tiger T710	12 nm FF TSMC	ARMv8.2-A	ARM Cortex-A75	4	2.0	PowerVR GM 9446 @ 800 MHz (102.4 GFLOPS in FP32)	LPDDR4/4X @ 1866 MHz	(TDD-LTE / FDD-LTE / TD-SCDMA / WCDMA / CDMA / GSM)	Q3 2019	
Tiger T710	12 nm FF TSMC	ARMv8.2-A	ARM Cortex-A55	4	1.8	PowerVR GM 9446 @ 800 MHz (102.4 GFLOPS in FP32)	LPDDR4/4X @ 1866 MHz	(TDD-LTE / FDD-LTE / TD-SCDMA / WCDMA / CDMA / GSM)	Q3 2019	

== 5G smartphone and tablet processors ==
Model number	Fab	CPU (ARMv8)	GPU	Memory technology	Wireless radio technologies	Released	Utilizing devices
Tanggula T740 (Tiger T7510)	12 nm (TSMC 12FFC)	4 + 4 cores (1.8 GHz Cortex-A75 + 1.8 GHz Cortex-A55)	PowerVR GM 9446 @ 800 MHz (102.4 GFLOPS in FP32)	LPDDR4/4X/4Y up to 1866 MHz	Wi-Fi 5 (802.11b/g/n/ac), Bluetooth 5.0/5.4, NSA, SA, GSM, WCDMA, LTE, TDD-LTE, FDD-LTE, Glonass, Beidou, Galileo, FM, GPS	Q1 2020	List: Hisense F50 5G, Hisense A7CC, Teclast T40 5G, Coolpad X10, AGM X5 Premium Edition
Tanggula T750	6 nm (TSMC N6)	2 + 6 cores (2.0 GHz Cortex-A76 + 1.8 GHz Cortex-A55)	Mali-G57 MP2 @ 680 MHz (87.0 GFLOPS in FP32)	LPDDR4X, eMMC5.1, UFS3.1	Wi-Fi 5 (802.11b/g/n/ac), Bluetooth 5.0/5.4, NSA, SA, GSM, WCDMA, LTE, TDD-LTE, FDD-LTE, Glonass, Beidou, Galileo, FM, GPS	Q2 2023	List: Lava Yuva (5G-Only)
Tanggula T760 / T8100	6 nm (TSMC N6)	4 + 4 cores (2.2 GHz Cortex-A76 + 2.0 GHz Cortex-A55)	Mali-G57 MP4 @ 650 MHz (166.4 GFLOPS in FP32)	Dual-channel; LPDDR4X up to 2133 MHz	Wi-Fi 5 (802.11b/g/n/ac), Bluetooth 5.0/5.4, NSA, SA, GSM, WCDMA, LTE, TDD-LTE, FDD-LTE, Glonass, Beidou, Galileo, FM, GPS	Q2 2021	List: Hisense P50 5G, Hisense H60, Coolpad Cool 60, Coolpad Daguan C60, Coolpad Daguan Y60s, Coolpad Daguan Y60 Lite, Coolpad Q1-CT, Coolpad Y70 Lite, Coolpad Y77, Blackview Rock 2, Blackview Rock 2 Pro, Blackview Shark 6, HMD Crest, HMD Vibe 5G, ZTE Voyage 30, ZTE Voyage 30s, Nubia Focus Pro 5G
Tanggula T765 / T8200	6 nm (TSMC N6)	2 + 6 cores (2.3 GHz Cortex-A76 + 2.1 GHz Cortex-A55)	Mali-G57 MC2 @ 850 MHz (108.8 GFLOPS in FP32)	Dual-channel; LPDDR4X up to 2133 MHz	Wi-Fi 5 (802.11b/g/n/ac), Bluetooth 5.0/5.4, NSA, SA, GSM, WCDMA, LTE, TDD-LTE, FDD-LTE, Glonass, Beidou, Galileo, FM, GPS	Q1 2024	List: Blackview Zeno 10, BLU Bold K22, HMD Vibe 2 5G, Itel City 300, Lava Shark, Lava Shark 2, Lava Virat V1 (5G-Only), Lava Virat V1 Pro, TNT Panalo Phone 5G
T8300	6 nm (TSMC N6)	2 + 6 cores (2.2 GHz Cortex-A78 + 2.0 GHz Cortex-A55)	Mali-G57 MC2 @ 950 MHz (121.6 GFLOPS in FP32)	Dual-channel; LPDDR4X up to 2133 MHz	Wi-Fi 5 (802.11b/g/n/ac), Bluetooth 5.0/5.4, NSA, SA, GSM, WCDMA, LTE, TDD-LTE, FDD-LTE, Glonass, Beidou, Galileo, FM, GPS	Q1 2025	List: Xiaomi Redmi A7 Pro (5G-Only), ZTE Fresh 70 Plus, nubia Neo 3 5G
Tanggula T770 (Tiger T7520)	6 nm (TSMC N6)	1 + 3 + 4 cores (2.5 GHz Cortex-A76 + 2.2 GHz Cortex-A76 + 2.0 GHz Cortex-A55)	Mali-G57 MP4 @ 780 MHz (199.7 GFLOPS in FP32)	Dual-channel; LPDDR4X up to 2133 MHz	Wi-Fi 5 (802.11b/g/n/ac), Bluetooth 5.0/5.4, NSA, SA, GSM, WCDMA, LTE, TDD-LTE, FDD-LTE, Glonass, Beidou, Galileo, FM, GPS	Q1 2020	List: ZTE Nubia N5, ZTE Voyage 40, ZTE Voyage 41
Tanggula T820 / T9100	6 nm (TSMC N6)	1 + 3 + 4 cores (2.7 GHz Cortex-A76 + 2.3 GHz Cortex-A76 + 2.1 GHz Cortex-A55)	Mali-G57 MP4 @ 780 MHz (199.7 GFLOPS in FP32)	Dual-channel; LPDDR4X up to 2133 MHz	Wi-Fi 5 (802.11b/g/n/ac), Bluetooth 5.0/5.4, NSA, SA, GSM, WCDMA, LTE, TDD-LTE, FDD-LTE, Glonass, Beidou, Galileo, FM, GPS	Q4 2022	List: nubia Neo 5G, nubia Neo 2 5G, nubia Neo 3 GT 5G
T9300	6 nm (TSMC N6)	2 + 6 cores (2.4 GHz Cortex-A78 + 2.2 GHz Cortex-A55)	Mali-G57 MC2 @ 1.1 GHz (140.8 GFLOPS in FP32)	Dual-channel; LPDDR4X up to 2133 MHz	Wi-Fi 5 (802.11b/g/n/ac), Bluetooth 5.0/5.4, NSA, SA, GSM, WCDMA, LTE, TDD-LTE, FDD-LTE, Glonass, Beidou, Galileo, FM, GPS	Q4 2025	List: nubia Neo 5 5G

== 3G modems ==
Model number	Fab	ISA	CPU	CPU cache	GPU	Memory technology	Wireless radio technologies	Released	Utilizing devices
SC8803G	40 nm LP	ARM9	Up to 256 MHz single-core ARM926EJ-S	?	—N/a	DDR1	GSM, GPRS, EDGE Class 12, TD-SCDMA, LTE 400 2300MHZ	?	

== 4G modems ==
Model number	Fab	ISA	CPU	CPU cache	GPU	Memory technology	Wireless radio technologies	Released	Utilizing devices
SC9610	40 nm LP	?	?	?	No GPU	?	Multiband TD-LTE and TD-SCDMA and quad-band EDGE/GPRS/GSM Downlink speeds of 100 Mbit/s Uplink speeds of 50 Mbit/s		

== 5G modems ==
Model number	Fab	ISA	CPU	CPU cache	GPU	Memory technology	Wireless radio technologies	Released	Utilizing devices
Makalu IVY510	12 nm FF TSMC	?	?	?	?	?	2G/3G/4G/5G 3GPP Release 15 compliant and support both SA and NSA network configurations	TBC	

== Smart wearables ==
Model Number	Fab	CPU	GPU	Memory technology	Wireless radio technologies	Released
8521E	28 nm HPC+	4 cores (1.4 GHz Cortex-A53 )	Mali-T820 MP1 @600 MHz	eMCP: 32Gb+4Gb or above	Modem:LTE FDD &TDDWCDMA,GSM Category:LTECat.4,VoLTE WCN:(Wi-Fi802.11bgn@2.4GHZ Bluetooth @ 4.2/GPS/ Glonass/ Beidou)	?
8541E	22 nm HPC+	4 + 4 cores (1.6 GHz Cortex-A55 + 1.2 GHz Cortex-A55)	IMG 8322 @550Mhz	LPDDR3/4X @933MHz	GNSS(GPS+Glonass+Beidou+Galileo)+ FM+Bluetooth 4.2	?
W307	28 nm HPC+ TSMC	4 cores (1.1 GHz Cortex-A53 )	?	LPDDR2	GSM/WCDMA/TDD-LTE/FDD-LTE	?
W517	12 nm	4 + 4 cores (2.0 GHz Cortex-A75 + 1.8 GHz Cortex-A55)	IMG 8300 @800Mhz	LPDDR3/LPDDR4x	GSM/WCDMA/TDD-LTE/FDD-LTE	?

== WAN IoT ==
Model Number	Fab	Cores	Memory	Additional
8541E	28 nm HPC+	4	LPDDR2, LPDDR3	Supports maximum HD+ resolution Supports USB HUB function (2HOST or 1HOST+4 Device)
8581E	28 nm HPC+	8	LPDDR3, LPDDR4/4X	
A7862E	12 nm	8	LPDDR3, LPDDR4/4X	Bluetooth 5 BLE GPS + Beidou + Glonass / GPS + Galileo + Glonass 3× SDIO 3.0 / USB 2.0 Type-C, USB 1.1 and OTG 2.0 / 4× SPI / 4× I2S / 8× I2C / 7× UART 150 GPIO
V8811	22 nm	1	Integrated 16 Mb/32M Flash	Supports 3GPP NB-IoT R13/R14/R15/R16
8910DM	28 nm	2	Integrated 64 Mb SPI Nor and 128 Mb PSRAM	VoLTE, 0.3M camera, AUDIO (with ADC/DAC), 2x USB (Host/Slave, HUB), 3x SDIO, 3x I2C, 3x UART, 2x PWM
8563	28 nm	4	LPDDR2, LPDDR3	4× SDIO 3.0 / USB 2.0 High speed, OTG/UART/SPI/I2S/I2C/GPIO 4-core 1.3 GHz Arm Cortex-A7 processor
V510	12 nm	2	LPDDR4/X	Supports TDD NR/FDD NR/FDD-LTE/TDD-LTE/TD-SCDMA/WCDMA/GSM Supports Sub-6 GHz, n78/n41/n79/n1/n28 and n77/n3/n8/n20 and other global mainstream frequency bands Supports VoNR technology and VoLTE in 5G SA mode

== LAN IoT ==
Model Number	Fab	Cores	Memory	Additional
5981	40 nm	1	PSRAM	ARM Cortex-M4, integrated MPU 802.11b/g/n, support for AP/STA USB2.0/SDIO 192K SRAM available to users, Support for plug-in PSRAM
V5663	22 nm	2	PSRAM	Wi-Fi 2.4/5G dual-frequency, MU-MIMO Supports Bluetooth AOA AOD+Wi-Fi RTT fusion positioning Bluetooth 5.0: Dual mode, long distance, Mesh, AoD

== Smart Display ==
Model Number	Fab	Cores	Memory	Additional
6710W	22 nm	2	DDR2 64Mb*16	Supports maximum 10bit FULL HD LVDS screen Built-in FHD TCON 2x USB 2.0, support for USB HUB
7605	40 nm	2	DDR3 64Mb*16	MPEG1/2/4, H.264/H.265 video decode WAVE/WMA/AAC/AC3/MPEG/FLAC audio decode Up to FHD image output
