= Realme C71 =

2025 smartphone model

Realme C71 Realme C73 4G
- Also sold as: Realme C73 4G
- Brand: Realme
- Manufacturer: Realme
- Series: Realme C series
- First released: June 2, 2025
- Availability by region: Malaysia: June 12, 2025 (November 4 for the 8GB + 256GB varirant); Philippines: June 19, 2025
- Compatible networks: GSM, HSPA, LTE
- Dimensions: 165.8 mm (6.53 in) H 75.9 mm (2.99 in) W 7.8 mm (0.31 in) D
- Weight: 196 g (6.9 oz)
- Operating system: Android 15 with Realme UI 6.0
- System-on-chip: Unisoc T7250 (12 nm)
- CPU: Octa-core (2x1.8 GHz Cortex-A75 & 6x1.6 GHz Cortex-A55)
- GPU: Mali-G57 MP1
- Memory: 4 GB, 6 GB, or 8 GB RAM
- Storage: 64 GB, 128 GB, or 256 GB
- Removable storage: microSDXC (dedicated slot)
- Battery: 6,000 mAh (Europe); 6,300 mAh (Asia); Non-removable
- Charging: 45W wired, 6W reverse wired
- Rear camera: 50 MP, f/1.8, 27mm (wide), 1/2.88", PDAF; LED flash, panorama Video: 1080p@30fps
- Front camera: 5 MP, f/2.2, 27mm (wide), 1/5.0"; Video: 720p@30fps
- Display: 6.67 in (169 mm) IPS LCD, 120Hz, 725 nits (peak); 720 × 1604 pixels, 20:9 ratio (~264 ppi)
- Sound: Loudspeaker, 3.5mm jack, 24-bit/192kHz Hi-Res audio
- Connectivity: Wi-Fi 802.11 a/b/g/n/ac, dual-band; Bluetooth 5.2, A2DP, LE; GPS, GALILEO, GLONASS, BDS; NFC (market/region dependent); USB Type-C 2.0, OTG
- Model: RMX5303
- Development status: Available, announced June 2, 2025

The Realme C71 (also known as the Realme C73 4G in some regions) is an entry-level Android smartphone manufactured, designed, and marketed by Realme as part of the C series. It was released on June 12, 2025 in Malaysia, followed by the Philippines 7 days later.

Later in that year, the C71's 8GB + 256GB storage configuration was released in Malaysia on November 4.

== Design ==
The Realme C71 features a slate form factor with dimensions of 165.8 mm × 75.9 mm × 7.8 mm (6.53 in × 2.99 in × 0.31 in) and weighs 196 grams (6.91 oz), alongside an official MIL-STD-810H compliance rating, offering drop resistance up to 1.5 meters. The display panel is reinforced with Mohs level 6 hardness protection.

The physical layout includes a side-mounted fingerprint sensor integrated into the power button, a USB Type-C 2.0 charging port, and a legacy 3.5 mm headphone jack. The smartphone was launched in four distinct color variants: Midnight Lily (also marketed as Forest Owl), Lily White (White Swan), Green, and White.

== Specifications ==
=== Hardware ===
The device is powered by a 12-nanometer Unisoc T7250 chipset, paired with an octa-core CPU (2×1.8 GHz Cortex-A75 and 6×1.6 GHz Cortex-A55) and a Mali-G57 MP1 graphics processing unit.

It is equipped with a 6.67-inch IPS LCD display featuring a 120Hz refresh rate, a peak brightness of 725 nits, and a 20:9 aspect ratio. The screen has a resolution of 720 × 1604 pixels with a pixel density of approximately 264 ppi, yielding an 85.2% screen-to-body ratio.

The Realme C71 comes in multiple internal storage configurations:

- Storage options: 64 GB, 128 GB, or 256 GB of built-in flash memory.
- RAM options: 4 GB, 6 GB, or 8 GB of RAM.
- Expansion: Storage can be expanded externally via a dedicated microSDXC card slot.

The smartphone utilizes market-dependent high-capacity battery configurations, featuring a 6,000 mAh capacity variant for European markets and a 6,300 mAh variant for Asian markets. It supports 45W wired fast charging (advertised to reach 50% capacity in 36 minutes) as well as 6W reverse wired charging.

=== Camera ===
The rear camera module consists of a single 50-megapixel wide-angle lens with an f/1.8 aperture, a 27mm focal length, a 1/2.88" sensor size, and Phase Detection Autofocus (PDAF). The rear camera system is accompanied by an LED flash and supports Panorama capture, with video recording capabilities up to 1080p at 30 frames per second. The front-facing selfie camera features a single 5-megapixel wide lens with an f/2.2 aperture capable of recording video at 720p at 30 frames per second.

=== Connectivity and software ===
The Realme C71 is a 4G LTE-capable device with dual Nano-SIM support. Wireless connectivity includes dual-band Wi-Fi (802.11 a/b/g/n/ac), Bluetooth 5.2 (with A2DP and LE support), and region-dependent NFC capabilities. Navigation and positioning are handled via GPS, GALILEO, GLONASS, and BDS satellite networks.

Audio features include an integrated loudspeaker and support for 24-bit/192kHz Hi-Res audio. Onboard sensors include an accelerometer, gyroscope, proximity sensor, and compass. The C71 runs on Android 15 with the Realme UI 6.0 user interface out of the box.
