= Realme V3 =

2020 budget smartphone

realme V3
- Brand: Realme
- Manufacturer: Realme
- Type: Smartphone
- Series: Realme V
- First released: September 10, 2020; 5 years ago
- Related: Realme Q2 & Q2i
- Compatible networks: GSM / CDMA / HSPA / EVDO / LTE / 5G
- Form factor: Slate
- Colors: Blue, Silver
- Dimensions: 164.4×76×8.6 mm (6.47×2.99×0.34 in)
- Weight: 6.7 oz (190 g)
- Operating system: Android 10 with Realme UI
- System-on-chip: Mediatek Dimensity 720 (7 nm)
- CPU: 2× 2.0 GHz Cortex-A76 & 6× 2.0 GHz Cortex-A55 octa-core
- GPU: Mali-G57 MC3
- Storage: 64 / 128 GB
- SIM: 2× nanoSIM
- Battery: 5,000 mAh
- Charging: 18 W wired
- Rear camera: 13 MP wide angle lens (f/2.2); 26 mm with PDAF; 2 MP macro 2 MP depth sneor Auxiliary lens; features LED flash, HDR and panorama Recording up to 1080p / 4K @ 30/60fps
- Front camera: 8 MP wide angle lens (f/2.0); 26 mm Featured HDR; Recording up to 1080p @ 30fps
- Display: 6.5" IPS LCD, 720 × 1600 px (20:9 ratio)

The realme V3 is a budget 5G smartphone developed & manufactured by realme as part of realme's V series. It was unveiled on September 1, 2020, in China along with the X7 and X7 Pro until its initial release 9 days later.

It was available at two color options: Blue and Silver.

== Specifications ==
=== Hardware ===
The realme V3 is powered by the Mediatek Dimensity 720 chipset with octa-core (layered with 2x 2.0 GHz Cortex-A76 & 6x 2.0 GHz Cortex-A55) and a Mali-G57 MC3 GPU. The device also comes with a 5000 mAh battery with 18W standard charging.

The realme V3 is available at 64 GB + 6 GB RAM, 128 GB + 6 GB RAM, or 128 GB + 8 GB RAM configurations. The external display features a 6.5 inch IPS LCD with resolution at 720 × 1600 pixels.

The realme V3 also features a triple camera setup:

- Main 13 MP (wide), 26 mm, f/2.2
- 2 MP macro
- 2 MP depth sensor

The front camera is an 8 MP wide angle lens with and aperture of f/2.0. The main camera supports 1080p and 4K video recording at 30/60fps, while the front does not support 4K, but it still has 1080p @ 30/60fps video recording.

=== Software ===
The realme V3 runs on Android 10 with the Realme UI interface.
