= Infinix Smart 10 =

2025 Android smartphone series

Infinix Smart 10 Infinix Smart 10 Plus Infinix Smart 10 HD
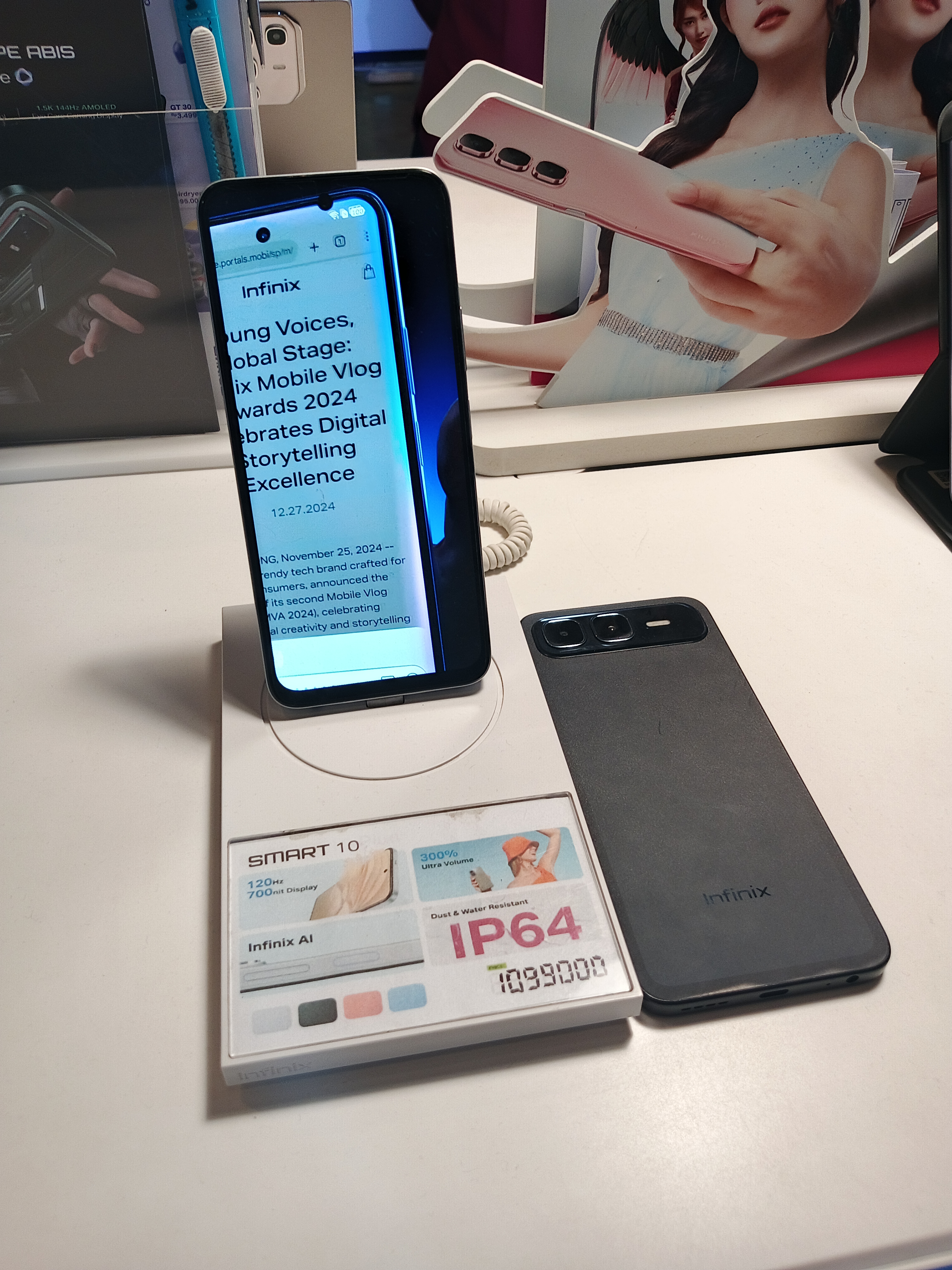
- Infinix Smart 10 and Infinix Smart 10 Plus
- Brand: Infinix
- Manufacturer: Transsion Holdings
- Type: Smartphone
- Series: Infinix Smart series
- First released: June 16, 2025
- Availability by region: June 16, 2025
- Predecessor: Infinix Smart 9
- Successor: Infinix Smart 20
- Compatible networks: GSM, HSPA, LTE
- Colors: Smart 10: Sleek Black, Titanium Silver, Iris Blue, Twilight Gold; Smart 10 Plus: Sleek Black, Titanium Silver, Iris Blue, Ruby Red; Smart 10 HD: Timber Black, Shiny Gold, Crystal Green, Galaxy White
- Dimensions: Smart 10 / 10 Plus: 165.6 mm × 77 mm × 8.3 mm (6.52 in × 3.03 in × 0.33 in); Smart 10 HD: 163.6 mm × 75.6 mm × 8.5 mm (6.44 in × 2.98 in × 0.33 in)
- Weight: Smart 10: 187 g (6.6 oz); Smart 10 Plus: 198 g (7.0 oz); Smart 10 HD: 184 g (6.5 oz)
- Operating system: Smart 10: Android 15 / Android 15 (Go edition), XOS 15.1; Smart 10 Plus: Android 15, XOS 15.1; Smart 10 HD: Android 14 (Go edition), XOS 13.6
- System-on-chip: Smart 10 / 10 Plus: Unisoc T7250 (12 nm); Smart 10 HD: Unisoc T606 (12 nm)
- CPU: Smart 10 / 10 Plus: Octa-core (2x1.8 GHz Cortex-A75 & 6x1.6 GHz Cortex-A55); Smart 10 HD: Octa-core (2x1.6 GHz Cortex-A75 & 6x1.6 GHz Cortex-A55)
- GPU: Smart 10 / 10 Plus: Mali-G57 MP1; Smart 10 HD: Mali-G57 MC1
- Memory: Smart 10: 3 GB, 4 GB, 6 GB, or 8 GB RAM; Smart 10 Plus: 4 GB or 8 GB RAM; Smart 10 HD: 2 GB RAM
- Storage: Smart 10: 64 GB, 128 GB, or 256 GB eMMC 5.1; Smart 10 Plus: 128 GB eMMC 5.1; Smart 10 HD: 64 GB eMMC 5.1
- Removable storage: microSDXC (dedicated slot)
- Battery: Smart 10: 5000 mAh, 15W wired charging; Smart 10 Plus: 6000 mAh, 18W wired charging; Smart 10 HD: 5000 mAh, 10W wired charging; (All variants support reverse wired charging)
- Rear camera: Smart 10 / 10 Plus: 8 MP, f/2.0 (wide), AF, Dual-LED flash, video 1440p@30fps; Smart 10 HD: 13 MP, f/1.9 (wide), AF, Quad-LED flash, video 1080p@30fps
- Front camera: Smart 10 / 10 Plus: 8 MP, f/2.0 (wide), video 1440p@30fps; Smart 10 HD: 8 MP, f/2.0 (wide), video 1080p@30fps
- Display: Smart 10 / 10 Plus: 6.67 in (169 mm) IPS LCD, 120Hz, 720 × 1600 pixels (20:9 ratio), ~263 ppi; Smart 10 HD: 6.6 in (170 mm) IPS LCD, 90Hz, 720 × 1612 pixels (20:9 ratio), ~267 ppi
- Sound: Smart 10 / 10 Plus: Loudspeaker with stereo speakers, 3.5 mm jack; Smart 10 HD: Loudspeaker, 3.5 mm jack
- Connectivity: Wi-Fi 802.11 a/b/g/n/ac, dual-band, Bluetooth, GPS, Infrared port, FM radio, USB Type-C 2.0, OTG; NFC support: Smart 10 / 10 Plus: Yes (market/region dependent; data transfer only); Smart 10 HD: No
- Data inputs: Side-mounted fingerprint scanner, accelerometer, proximity, compass
- Water resistance: Smart 10 / 10 Plus: IP64 dust/water resistance; drop-resistant up to 1.5m; Smart 10 HD: None specified
- Model: Smart 10: X6725; Smart 10 Plus: X6725B_C, X6725B; Smart 10 HD: X6525D
- Development status: Available

The Infinix Smart 10 is a series of Android-based entry level smartphones released simultaneously on June 16, 2025, including the standard model, the 10 Plus model, and the 10 HD model. It was designed, manufactured, and marketed by Transsision holdings under it smartphone brand Infinix Mobile. The Smart 10 was released on July 2 on that year in the Philippines following its official debut.

The Infinix Smart 10 Plus has the same camera module design, but it has a horizontal angle. The Infinix Smart 10 HD received an upgrade in the rear camera.

== Specifications ==
=== Design ===
All models were made of glass at the front and made of plastic for the back and frames. The weight and mass was differentiated by the following models:

	Smart 10	Smart 10 Plus	Smart 10 HD
Dimensions	165.6 mm × 77 mm × 8.3 mm (6.52 in × 3.03 in × 0.33 in)		163.6 mm × 75.6 mm × 8.5 mm (6.44 in × 2.98 in × 0.33 in)
Weight	187 g	198 g	184 g

It was protected by an IP64 dust and splash resistance and a drop resistance up to 1.5 meters. All models were equipped by the IPS LCD display, with a refresh rate up to 120Hz for the Smart 10/10 Plus and 90Hz for the Smart 10 HD. The 10 and 10 Plus also has a display size of 6.67 inches and 6,6 inches for the 10 HD, a reloution of 720 × 1600 pixels for the 10 and 10 Plus; and 720 × 1612 pixels for the 10 HD, and all models with 20:9 ratio. The models come with a built-in DTS dual speaker.

It was available at the following color options: Sleek Black Titanium Silver, Iris Blue, and Twilight Gold for the Smart 10, the same 3 colors and one replaced with Ruby Red for the Smart 10 Plus, and Timber Black, Shiny Gold, Crystal Green, and Galaxy White for the Smart 10 HD.

=== Hardware ===
Both the Smart 10 and Smart 10 Plus were equipped by a Unisoc T7250 chipset, while the Smart 10 HD was equipped with an unspecified chipset. Under its chipset, both models had the same octa-core processor composed of two Cortex-A75 cores and six Cortex-A55 cores. They were clocking at 1.6 to 1.8 GHz respectively, but the Smart 10 HD had a slower 1.6 GHz Cortex-A75 processor.

Both the Smart 10 and Smart 10 HD models received a battery capacity of 5,000 mAh, while the Smart 10 Plus had a 6000 mAh battery. It received some of the following chargers with different watts:

- Smart 10 - 15W
- Smart 10 Plus - 18W
- Smart 10 HD - 10W

All models support reverse charging.

=== Memory and camera ===
The smartphones came with an internal storage of 64,128 or 256 gigabytes and a RAM of 3, 4, 6, or 8 gigabytes of memory. The configurations were alternated by the following models:

Memory configuration
Smart 10	Smart 10 Plus	Smart 10 HD
64GB with 3 or 4 gigabyes of memory	none	64GB with 2 gigabytes of memory (no 3 or 4 GB support)
128GB with 4 or 6 gigabytes of memory		No 128GB support
8GB RAM support: none for the 128GB variant	128GB with 8 gigabytes of memory	No 128GB support
256GB with 4 or 6 gigabytes of memory	No 256GB support	

The models were received their single camera setup, and was altenated from the following models:

Camera setup
	Smart 10	Smart 10 Plus	Smart 10 HD
Resolution	8 megapixels (wide, lens size: 1/4.0"), 1.12 µm		13 megapixels (wide), 27mm
Aperture	f/2.0		f/1.9
Features	Dual-LED flash, panorama		Quad-LED flash
Video	1080 pixels @ 30 frames per second		
Video	1440 pixels @ 30 frames per second		No 1440p support

=== Software ===
The Smart 10 and 10 Plus were booted by Android 15 operating system (includes Go edition for the Smart 10) with XOS 15.1 user interface, while the 10 HD runs on Android 14 Go edition.

== Release and availability ==
The Smart 10 series was released on June 16, 2025, in Malaysia. It was also launched in the Philippines on July 2 (September 22 for the 10 Plus) and in India via Flipkart exclusively on July 25 with that year. It comed with a lag-free spending up to 4 years and drop tests up to 25,000 drops.
