= Million service units =

A million service units (MSU) is a measurement of the amount of processing work a computer can perform in one hour. The term is most commonly associated with IBM mainframes. It reflects how IBM rates the machine in terms of charging capacity. The technical measure of processing power on IBM mainframes, however, are Service Units per second (or SU/sec).

One “service unit” originally related to an actual hardware performance measurement (a specific model's instruction performance). However, that relationship disappeared many years ago as hardware and software evolved. MSUs are now like other common (but physically imprecise) measurements, such as “cans of coffee” or “tubes of toothpaste.” (Cans and tubes can vary in physical size depending on brand, market, and other factors. Some coffee cans contain 500 grams and others 13 ounces, for example.)

Most mainframe software vendors use a licensing and pricing model in which the customers are charged per MSU consumed (i.e. the number of operations the software has performed) in addition to hardware and software installation costs. Others charge by total MSU system capacity. Thus, while MSU is an artificial construction, it does have a direct financial implication. In fact, software charges are why the MSU measurement exists at all.

IBM publishes MSU ratings for every mainframe server model, including the zSeries and System z9 ranges. For example, a zSeries z890 Model 110 is a 4 MSU system. MSU ratings are always rounded to whole numbers. IBM enforces an MSU rule called the “technology dividend”: each new mainframe model has a 10% lower MSU rating for the same level of system capacity. For example, when IBM introduced the System z9-109 in 2005, if a particular z9 configuration could process the same number of transactions per second as its predecessor (a particular z990 configuration) then it would do so with 10% fewer MSUs. The lower MSU rating means lower software costs, providing an incentive for customers to upgrade.

However, as software costs are not linear with MSUs, decreasing or increasing MSUs will not show a proportional change in software costs. The "least expensive" MSUs will be added (with increased MSUs) or removed (with decreased MSUs). For example, a 10% increase in MSUs will result in a software cost increase of less than 10%. How much more (or less, if reducing MSUs) depends on numerous other factors.

== Sample usage ==
- “Our accounting department will need 6.5 MSUs on a System z9-109 from 10 p.m. to 1:00 a.m. each night in order make sure our quarterly financial statements arrive on time.”
- “You will need 8 more Db2 MSUs for your z900 to handle this year’s Christmas sales rush. Since your current z900 configuration doesn’t have enough capacity to add 8 Db2 MSUs, you need to add another engine. It might be less expensive to upgrade to a z9 because of the double technology dividend.”

== See also ==
- Instructions per second
- z/OS
- z/VSE
