= ARM Cortex-A76 =

CPU released in 2018

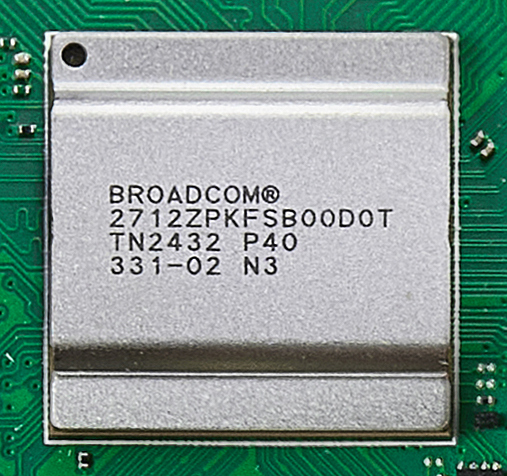
- Broadcom BCM2712, a system on a chip with four ARM Cortex-A76 CPUs

General information
- Launched: 2018
- Designed by: ARM Holdings

Performance
- Max. CPU clock rate: to 3 GHz in phones, 3.3 GHz in tablets/laptops
- Address width: 40-bit

Physical specifications
- Cores: 1–4
- Co-processor: ARM Cortex-A55 (optional)

Cache
- L1 cache: 128 KiB (64 KiB D-cache and 64 KiB I-cache with parity) per core
- L2 cache: 128–512 KiB per core
- L3 cache: 512 KiB–4 MiB (optional)

Architecture and classification
- Technology node: 7 nm
- Instruction set: ARMv8-A: A64, A32, T32
- Extensions: ARMv8.1-A, ARMv8.2-A, ARMv8.3-A, (Note: LDAPR instructions) ARMv8.4-A, (Note: Dot product instructions) Cryptography, RAS

Products, models, variants
- Product code name: Enyo
- Variant: Arm Neoverse N1

History
- Predecessors: ARM Cortex-A75; ARM Cortex-A73; ARM Cortex-A72
- Successor: ARM Cortex-A77

The ARM Cortex-A76 is a central processing unit (CPU) core implementing the 64-bit ARMv8.2-A architecture, designed by Arm Holdings' design center in Austin, Texas. Compared to its predecessor, the Cortex-A75, ARM claimed performance improvements of up to 25% in integer operations and 35% in floating-point operations.

== Design ==
The Cortex-A76 is a successor to both the Cortex-A73 and Cortex-A75, though it is based on an entirely new microarchitecture. It features a 4-wide decode, out-of-order, superscalar pipeline. The frontend can fetch and decode four instructions per cycle and dispatch up to four macro-operations and eight micro-operations per cycle. The out-of-order execution window includes 128 entries. The backend includes eight execution ports, with a pipeline depth of 13 stages and execution latencies of 11 stages.

The Cortex-A76 supports unprivileged 32-bit applications, but privileged software, such as operating systems and kernels, must use the 64-bit ARMv8-A instruction set. Additional features include support for ARMv8.3-A's LDAPR instructions, ARMv8.4-A's dot product instructions, and ARMv8.5-A's speculative execution controls such as SSBS, CSDB, SSBB, and PSSBB.

Memory bandwidth is improved by up to 90% over the Cortex-A75. ARM targeted the Cortex-A76 for high-performance computing, including Windows 10 laptops, positioning it as a competitor to Intel’s Kaby Lake architecture.

The Cortex-A76 also supports ARM DynamIQ technology, and is often paired with energy-efficient Cortex-A55 cores in multi-core configurations.

== Usage ==
The Cortex-A76 is available as a semiconductor intellectual property core (SIP core) and can be licensed by manufacturers for integration into custom system on a chip (SoC) designs. It is commonly combined with other components such as graphics processing units (GPUs), digital signal processors (DSPs), and image signal processors (ISPs) on a single chip.

The Cortex-A76 first appeared in the HiSilicon Kirin 980 SoC. The company's later Kirin 985 and 990 series of SoCs would also use the A76.

ARM collaborated with Qualcomm on semi-custom versions of the Cortex-A76 used in several of its Kryo CPU designs, including the Kryo 495 (Snapdragon 8cx), Kryo 485 (Snapdragon 855/855 Plus), Kryo 470 (Snapdragon 730), and Kryo 460 (Snapdragon 675). Qualcomm made several architectural modifications, such as increasing the reorder buffer to expand the out-of-order execution window.

Other SoCs using the Cortex-A76 include:

- Allwinner: A733
- Broadcom BCM2712 SoC (2023) with four A76 cores. Used in the Raspberry Pi 5.
- Google Tensor
- HiSilicon: Kirin 810, 820, 980, 985, 990
- Intel Agilex D-series SoC FPGAs
- Marvell: OCTEON TX2® CN92XX, CN96XX and CN98XX (circa 2020).
- MediaTek: MT6781, MT6785V, MT6789, MT6833V/P, MT6853V/T, MT6873, MT6875, MT8192, Dimensity 6020, 6080, 6100+, 6300(+), 6400, Helio G90, G90T, G95, G99, and Dimensity 800 and 820
- Microsoft: SQ1, SQ2
- Qualcomm: Snapdragon 480(+), 675, 678, 720G, 730(G), 732G, 765(G), 768G, 855(+), 860, 7c (Gen 2), 8c, 8cx (Gen 2)
- Rockchip: RK3588, RK3588S
- Samsung: Exynos 990, Exynos Auto V9
- UNISOC: S713, S752, S762, S913, T750, T760, T765, T770, T820, T8100, T8200, T9100

== See also ==
- Comparison of ARM processors
