= ARM Cortex-A53 =

2012 computer chip design

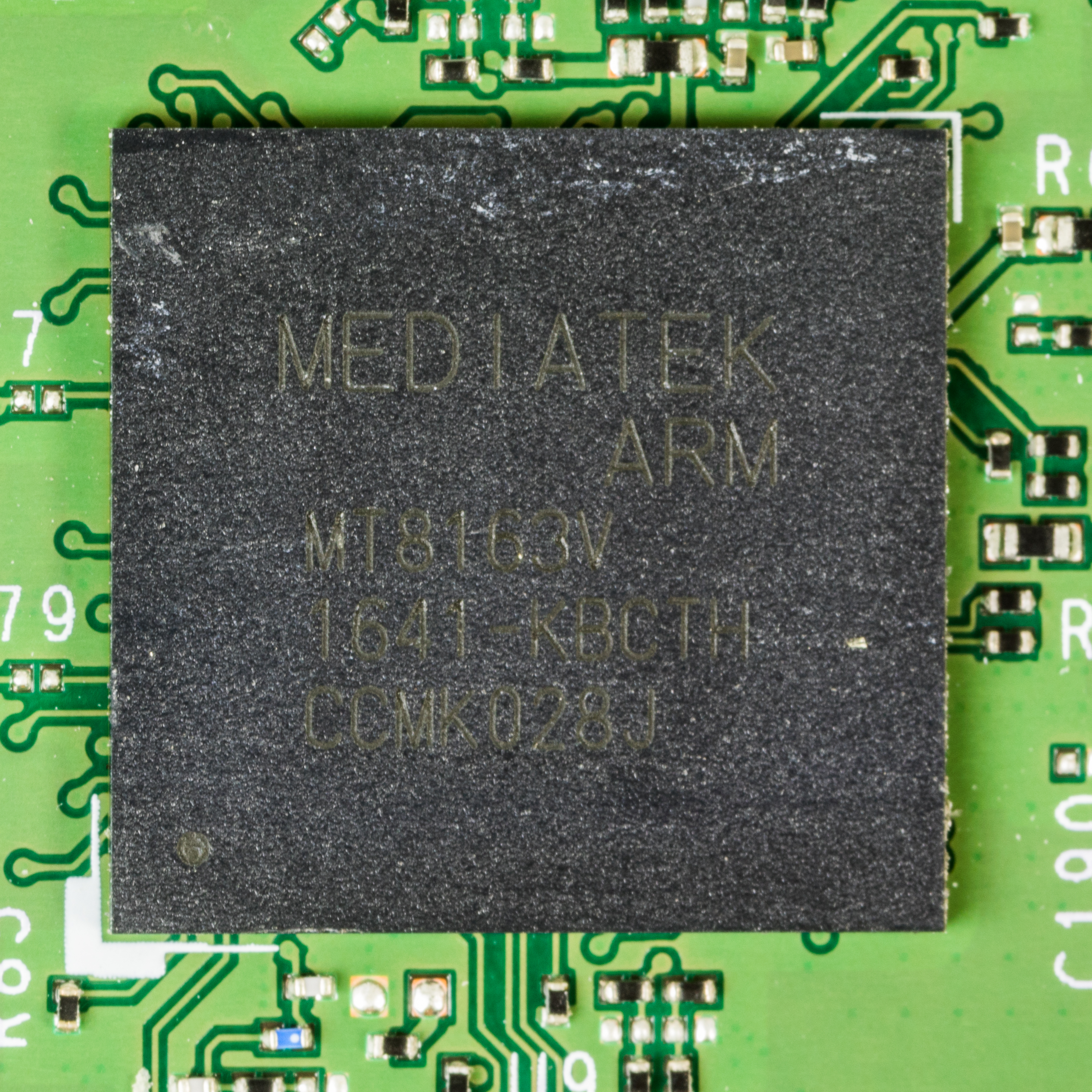
- MediaTek MT8163V on printed circuit board of an disassembled Amazon Echo Dot

General information
- Launched: 2012
- Designed by: ARM Holdings

Performance
- Max. CPU clock rate: 400 MHz to 2.30 GHz
- FSB speeds: 100 MHz to 118 MHz OC

Physical specifications
- Cores: 1–8 per cluster

Cache
- L1 cache: 8–64 KiB
- L2 cache: 128 KiB – 2 MiB

Architecture and classification
- Instruction set: ARMv8-A

Products, models, variants
- Product code name: Apollo

History
- Predecessor: ARM Cortex-A7
- Successor: ARM Cortex-A55

In computing, the Cortex-A53 is a CPU microarchitecture of the ARMv8-A family, designed and licensed by Arm Holdings as a semiconductor intellectual property core (SIP core). It is a 64-bit, in-order, speculative superscalar core, based on the Aarch64 instruction set architecture (ISA), and supports both symmetric and heterogeneous multiprocessing (HMP), such as via a big.LITTLE configuration. It was one of the earliest 64-bit designs marketed by Arm, being released along its larger sibling, the Cortex-A57, in 2012.

The Cortex-A53 is marketed by ARM as either a stand-alone, more energy-efficient alternative to the more powerful Cortex-A57 microarchitecture, or to be used alongside a more powerful microarchitecture in a big.LITTLE configuration.

== Overview ==
- 8-stage pipelined processor with 2-way superscalar, in-order execution pipeline
- DSP and NEON SIMD extensions are mandatory per core
- VFPv4 Floating Point Unit onboard (per core)
- Hardware virtualization support
- TrustZone security extensions
- 64-byte cache lines
- 10-entry L1 TLB, and 512-entry L2 TLB
- 4 KiB conditional branch predictor, 256-entry indirect branch predictor

== Utilization ==
The Cortex-A53 is the most widely used CPU microarchitecture for mobile computing systems on chip (SoCs) from 2014 to 2025, making it one of the longest-running ARM platform for mobile devices. It is currently featured in most entry-level and lower mid-range SoCs, while higher-end SoCs used the newer ARM Cortex-A55. The latest SoC still using the Cortex-A53 is the MediaTek Helio G50, which is an entry-level SoC designed for budget smartphones.

The ARM Cortex-A53 processor has been used in the LeMaker HiKey since 2015, the Raspberry Pi 3 since February 2016, and the Raspberry Pi Zero 2 W since October 2021.

The Cortex-A53 is also used in a number of Qualcomm, Samsung, and MediaTek SoCs. Semi-custom derivatives of the Cortex-A53 have been used in Qualcomm's Kryo 250 and Kryo 260 CPUs. The Starlink ground terminals utilize a quad-core Cortex-A53 SoC from STMicroelectronics as a main control unit.

The processor is used in the ODROID-C2 and in Roku streaming media players (in the high-end models from 2016 and in all models released between 2017 and 2019). Another notable Cortex-A53 application is the Pine A64/A64+ single-board computer.

These cores are used in a 24-core SoC, the Socionext SynQuacer SC2A11.

The processor is used in Amazon Fire tablets, including the Fire HD 8 and the Fire HD 10 (the latter also includes Cortex-A72 cores). It is also used in some Amazon Echo Show models such as the Echo Show 5, Echo Show 8, and Echo Show 5 (2nd Gen).

The processor is used in Fortinet's Fortigate 81F entry-level firewalls.

Automotive electronic control units utilize A53 cores for vehicle network processing and high-performance real-time computations.

== See also ==
- Comparison of ARMv8-A cores
