= ARM Cortex-A75 =

Microprocessor

General information
- Launched: 2017
- Designed by: ARM Holdings
- Max. CPU clock rate: to 3.0 GHz

Physical specifications
- Cores: 1–8 per cluster, multiple clusters

Cache
- L1 cache: 128 KB (64 KB I-cache with parity, 64 KB D-cache) per core
- L2 cache: 256–512 KB
- L3 cache: 1–4 MB

Architecture and classification
- Application: Mobile; Network Infrastructure; Automotive designs Servers
- Instruction set: ARMv8.2-A

Products, models, variants
- Product code name: Prometheus

History
- Predecessors: ARM Cortex-A73; ARM Cortex-A72; ARM Cortex-A17
- Successor: ARM Cortex-A76

The ARM Cortex-A75 is a central processing unit implementing the ARMv8.2-A 64-bit instruction set designed by ARM Holdings's Sophia design centre. The Cortex-A75 is a 3-wide decode out-of-order superscalar pipeline. The Cortex-A75 serves as the successor of the Cortex-A73, designed to improve performance by 20% over the A73 in mobile applications while maintaining the same efficiency.

== Design ==
According to ARM, the A75 is expected to offer 16–48% better performance than an A73 and is targeted beyond mobile workloads. The A75 also features an increased TDP envelope of 2 W, enabling increased performance.

The Cortex-A75 and Cortex-A55 cores are the first products to support ARM's DynamIQ technology. The successor to big.LITTLE, this technology is designed to be more flexible and scalable when designing multi-core products.

== Licensing ==
The Cortex-A75 is available as SIP core to licensees, and its design makes it suitable for integration with other SIP cores (e.g. GPU, display controller, DSP, image processor, etc.) into one die constituting a system on a chip (SoC).

ARM has also collaborated with Qualcomm for a semi-custom version of the Cortex-A75, used within the Kryo 385 CPU. This semi-custom core is also used in some Qualcomm's mid-range SoCs as Kryo 360 Gold.

== See also ==
- ARM Cortex-A73, predecessor
- ARM Cortex-A76, successor
- Comparison of ARMv8-A cores, ARMv8 family
