= ARM Cortex-A55 =

ARM microprocessor core model

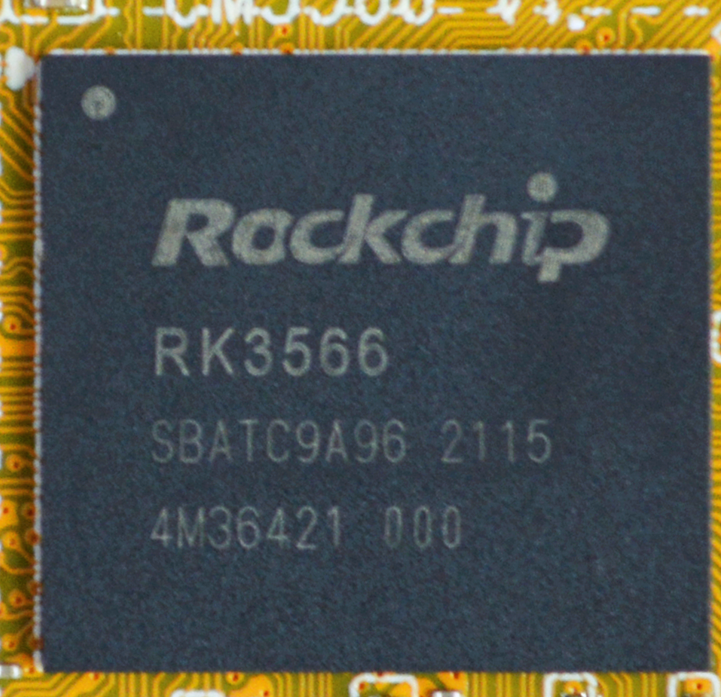
- Rockchip RK3566 SoC, which contains four Cortex-A55 cores

General information
- Launched: 2017
- Designed by: ARM Holdings

Performance
- Max. CPU clock rate: 1.25 GHz to 2.31 GHz

Physical specifications
- Cores: 1–8 per cluster, multiple clusters

Cache
- L1 cache: 32–128 KB (16–64 KB I-cache with parity, 16–64 KB D-cache) per core
- L2 cache: 64–256 KB
- L3 cache: 512 KB – 4 MB

Architecture and classification
- Application: Mobile
- Instruction set: ARMv8.2-A

Products, models, variants
- Product code name: Ananke

History
- Predecessor: ARM Cortex-A53
- Successor: ARM Cortex-A510

The ARM Cortex-A55 is a central processing unit implementing the ARMv8.2-A 64-bit instruction set designed by ARM Holdings' Cambridge design centre. The Cortex-A55 is a two-wide decode in-order superscalar pipeline.

== Design ==
The Cortex-A55 serves as the successor of the ARM Cortex-A53, designed to improve performance and energy efficiency over the A53. ARM has stated the A55 should have 15% improved power efficiency and 18% increased performance relative to the A53. Memory access and branch prediction are also improved relative to the A53.

The Cortex-A75 and Cortex-A55 cores are the first products to support ARM's DynamIQ technology. The successor to big.LITTLE, this technology is designed to be more flexible and scalable when designing multi-core products.

== Licensing ==
The Cortex-A55 is available as SIP core to licensees, and its design makes it suitable for integration with other SIP cores (e.g. GPU, display controller, DSP, image processor, etc.) into one die constituting a system on a chip (SoC).

ARM has also collaborated with Qualcomm for a semi-custom version of the Cortex-A55, used within the Kryo 385 CPU core. This semi-custom core is also used in some Qualcomm's mid-range SoCs as Kryo 360 Silver and Kryo 460 Silver.

== Usage ==
- The Cortex-A55 is used as Little-core in Intel Agilex D-series SoC FPGA devices.
- Amlogic S905X3, S905X4, A113D2, T962X2, T968X2, T962D2.
- JLQ JR510 and NXP i.MX93.
- Google Tensor G1, G2.
- MediaTek Dimensity 700, 720, 800, 820, 900, 920, 1000, 1080, 6020, 6100, 6300, 7050, 7300, 8000, 8020, 8050, 8100, 8200, 8250.
- MediaTek Helio G70, G80, G81, G85, G88, G91, G92, G90, G90T, G95, G96, G99, G99+, G100, G200.
- MediaTek Kompanio 520, 528, 540, 800T, 820, 828, 838, 900T, 1200, 1300T, 1380.
- Qualcomm Snapdragon 7s Gen 2, Snapdragon 6 gen 3, Snapdragon 4 gen 1.
- Rockchip RK3566, RK3568, RK3582, RK3588.
- Samsung Exynos 850, Exynos 1280, Exynos 1330, Exynos 1380, Exynos 1480.
- Unisoc SC9863A, SC9863A1.
