= Denis Sverdlov =

Russian businessman (born 1978)

- Денис Свердлов
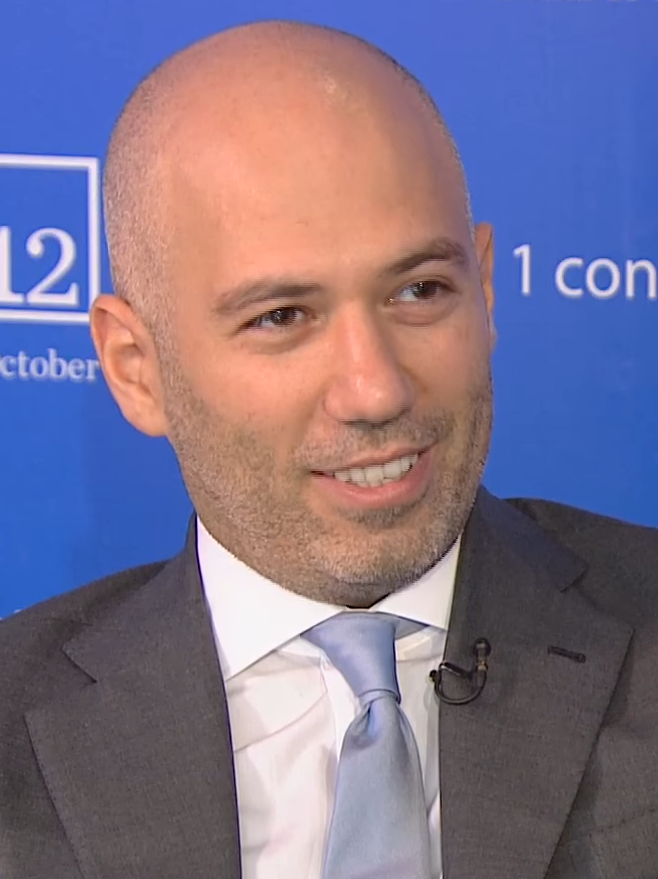
- Sverdlov in 2012
- Born: Denis Lvovich Sverdlov; 6 June 1978 (age 48); Agara, Georgian SSR, Soviet Union (now Georgia)
- Education: Saint Petersburg State University of Engineering and Economics
- Occupation: Businessman
- Title: Founder and former CEO of Arrival
- Term: March 2016 – November 2022
- Children: 3

Denis Lvovich Sverdlov (Russian: Денис Львович Свердлов; born 6 June 1978) is a British-based Russian businessman, and the founder and former CEO of Arrival, a former British electric vehicle manufacturer that was based in London. The businessman who was worth $11.7 billion in April 2021 lost his billionaire status in April 2022. Sverdlov's 94% decline in net worth is the largest wealth loss of anyone outside China who appeared on the Bloomberg Billionaires Index in 2021. In 2012–13, he was Russia's deputy minister for communications and mass media.

== Early life ==
Sverdlov was born in 1978 in Agara in the then Soviet republic of Georgia. He was raised in Saint Petersburg by his engineer parents who were employed at a state-operated factory specializing in manufacturing fan blades used in electrical turbines. He has a degree in economics from Saint Petersburg State University of Engineering and Economics.

== Career ==
After graduating in 2000 Sverdlov founded IT Vision, an IT consulting firm.

From 2003 to 2007, Sverdlov was the co-founder and managing partner of Korus Consulting, an IT consulting firm in Russia.

Sverdlov was a co-founder and chief executive of Yota, a Russian mobile broadband company, until its acquisition by MegaFon in 2012. He sold the Yota for $1.2 billion.

Post-acquisition Sverdlov set up the Kinetik Trust to invest in a range of promising technologies and bring them to market.

He was Russia's deputy Communications and Mass Media Minister for 15 months before stepping down in 2013. He left this position following new legislation which banned government officials from holding assets abroad.

Sverdlov founded Arrival and began its operations in the UK in 2015. He was its CEO from March 2016 until November 2022. In March 2021 Arrival went public through a merger with a special-purpose acquisition company, CIIG Merger Corp. In February 2024, after getting its stock delisted from the Nasdaq, Arrival's UK division entered administration, with future plans of a sale of Arrival and all of its affiliated assets.

He is also the founder of Roborace – the world's first driverless electric racing platform, which folded in 2022.

== Achievements ==
In 2009, under the leadership of Denis Sverdlov, Yota reached operational profitability within the first five months of commercial operations.

In 2011, Sverdlov was included in the Global Telecoms Business magazine's ranking of the most successful young entrepreneurs.

In 2021, Denis Sverdlov's company Arrival was valued at approximately $13.6–13.8 billion during its stock market debut, making it the largest listing in the history of British startups.

== Personal life ==
Sverdlov is married, with three children, and the family moved from France to London in September 2015.
