= Herotopia =

2010 video game

- Developer(s): Herotainment
- Publisher(s): Jagex
- Platform(s): Flash
- Release: 14 July 2010
- Genre(s): MMORPG
- Mode(s): Multiplayer

Herotopia was a Flash-based MMORPG created by American developer Herotainment. Herotopia was first announced in 2010 by its creators Brian Krauss, and Wade and Caryn Temanas as a way to help children learn different ways to deal with bullies. The game was re-released in 2011, with Peter Cuneo investing in the game. As of 2019, the game appears to be taken offline.

== Premise ==
The game's focus deals on a group of superheroes that must deal with a gang called the Bully Bunch that is planning to play pranks such as defacing the Statue of Liberty. Players create their own avatars and choose a super power that they will use throughout the game. Game play consists of the user traveling throughout the world seeking out clues and games that utilize foreign language, reading skills, and geography.

== Reception ==
The game received a positive review by Commonsensemedia, who gave it high ratings for its positive messages and easy game play. Herotopia also won a Gold National Parenting Publications Awards for offering "kids a rich and engaging world for them to become their ultimate Superheroes". Stripes.com also positively reviewed the game, writing that the "game play, quests and games were fun and well suited for the 6-12 age range that the developers are aiming for" but that the music was "a bit repetitive".
