= Samtskaro =

Samtsverisi სამწევრისი
- Village
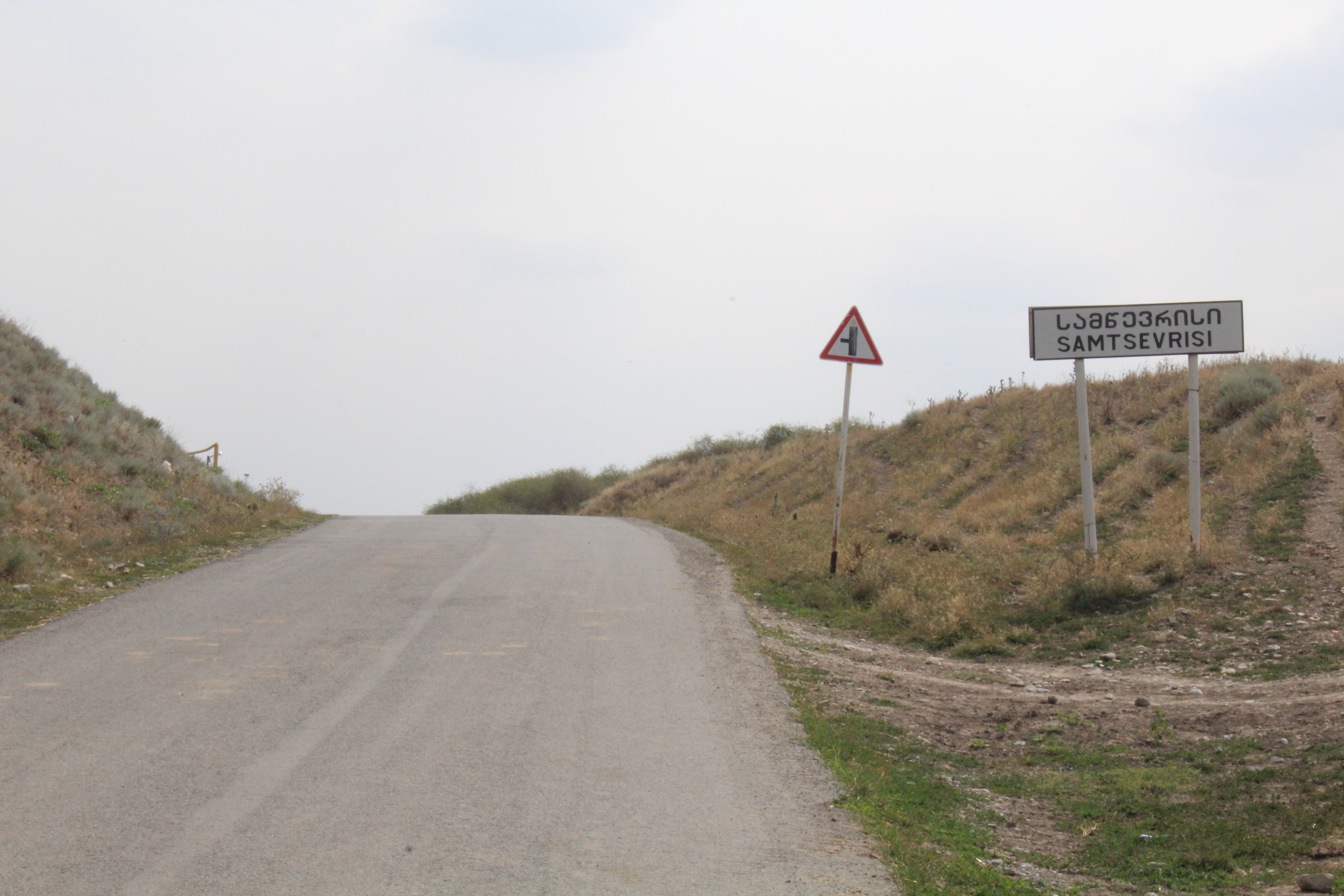

- Location within Georgia
- Coordinates: 42°01′02″N 43°50′36″E
- Country: Georgia
- Region: Shida Kartli
- Municipality: Kareli
- Community: Kekhijvari
- Elevation: 640 m (2,100 ft)

Population (2014)
  - Total: 360
- Time zone: +4
- Area code: +995

Samtsverisi (Georgian: სამწევრისი) is a village in Georgia, located in the Kareli Municipality of Shida Kartli, within the Kekhijvari community. The village lies on the right bank of the Kura River, in the northern foothills of the Trialeti Range. It is situated at an elevation of 640 metres above sea level, 4.5 kilometres from Kareli, and 2 kilometres from Agara.

== History ==
The village was first mentioned in written sources in the 14th century. Remains of late Bronze Age settlements have been discovered in the area. Nearby stands a monument of the early flourishing period of Georgian architecture (4th–7th centuries) – the Samtsverisi church (first half of the 7th century).

== Demographics ==
According to the 2014 census, the village has a population of 360.

Census year	Population	Male	Female
2002	401	183	218
2014	▼360	169	191
