= 2017 Hong Kong ePrix =

Race 1 of 12 of the 2017–18 Formula E Championship
Next race →
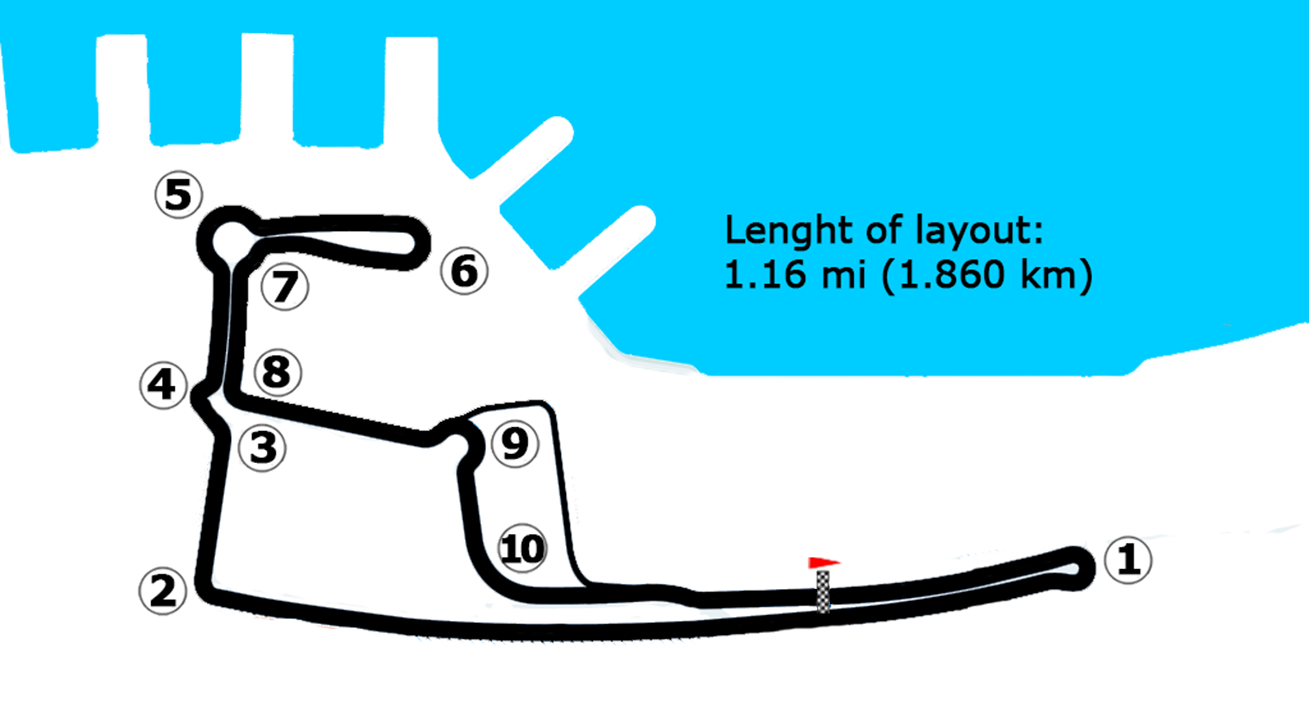

Race details
- Date: 2 December 2017
- Official name: 2017 FIA Formula E HKT Hong Kong ePrix
- Location: Hong Kong Central Harbourfront Circuit, Hong Kong
- Course: Street circuit
- Course length: 1.860 kilometres (1.156 mi)
- Distance: 43 laps, 79.98 miles (128.72 km)
- Weather: Sunny

Pole position
Driver	(France) Jean-Éric Vergne	Techeetah-Renault
- Time: 1:03.568

Fastest lap
Driver	(Belgium) Jérôme d'Ambrosio	Dragon-Penske
- Time: 1:04.297 on lap 34

Podium
First	(United Kingdom) Sam Bird	Virgin-Citroën
Second	(France) Jean-Éric Vergne	Techeetah-Renault
Third	(Germany) Nick Heidfeld	Mahindra

The 2017 Hong Kong ePrix (formally the 2017 FIA Formula E HKT Hong Kong ePrix for sponsorship purposes) was a pair of Formula E electric car races held on 2 and 3 December 2017 at the Hong Kong Central Harbourfront Circuit in Hong Kong before a two-day crowd of 27,000 people. They were the first and second races of the 2017–18 Formula E Championship and the second running of the event. The 43-lap race on 2 December was won by Virgin driver Sam Bird from second place. Jean-Éric Vergne finished second for the Techeetah team and Mahindra driver Nick Heidfeld was third. The longer 45-lap race held on 3 December was won by Heidfeld's teammate Felix Rosenqvist from pole position. Edoardo Mortara of the Venturi team was the highest-placed rookie in second and Jaguar's Mitch Evans was third.

Vergne won the pole position for the first race by recording the fastest lap in qualifying and maintained his startline advantage on the first lap. The race saw the first race stoppage in Formula E history on the first lap when rookie André Lotterer was caught out by traffic and hit the turn three and four chicane barrier, forcing three other cars to stop on track. After the running order was sorted, the race restarted half an hour later behind the safety car with Vergne leading Bird. On lap 20, Bird took the lead from Vergne, and held it for the rest of the race despite incurring a drive-through penalty for a collision with the side of his garage in the pit lane claim his sixth career victory.

Rosenqvist took pole position for the second race which began behind the safety car because of a technical failure that stopped the lights gantry from working. He immediately lost the lead when he half-spun at turn one, allowing Mortara to pass him for the position. Mortara managed his electrical energy usage better than the rest of the field to lead for most of the race. With three laps left, however, Mortara spun at turn two, promoting Abt into first place who held it to finish first on-track. Three hours after the race, Abt was disqualified because his inverter and motor-generator unit security stickers did not match those on his car's technical passport. Audi did not take up an appeal to protest the decision and Rosenqvist took his second career victory.

After the races Bird led the Drivers' Championship by two points over Vergne in second. Rosenqvist's victory in the second race put him third on 29 points while Mortara was a further five points behind in fourth and Heidfeld was fifth. Mahindra took the early lead in the Teams' Championship with 44 points; Virgin were in second place on 41 and Techeetah were a further eight points behind in third. Venturi were fourth on 30 points and Jaguar rounded out the top five with ten races left in the season.

== Background ==
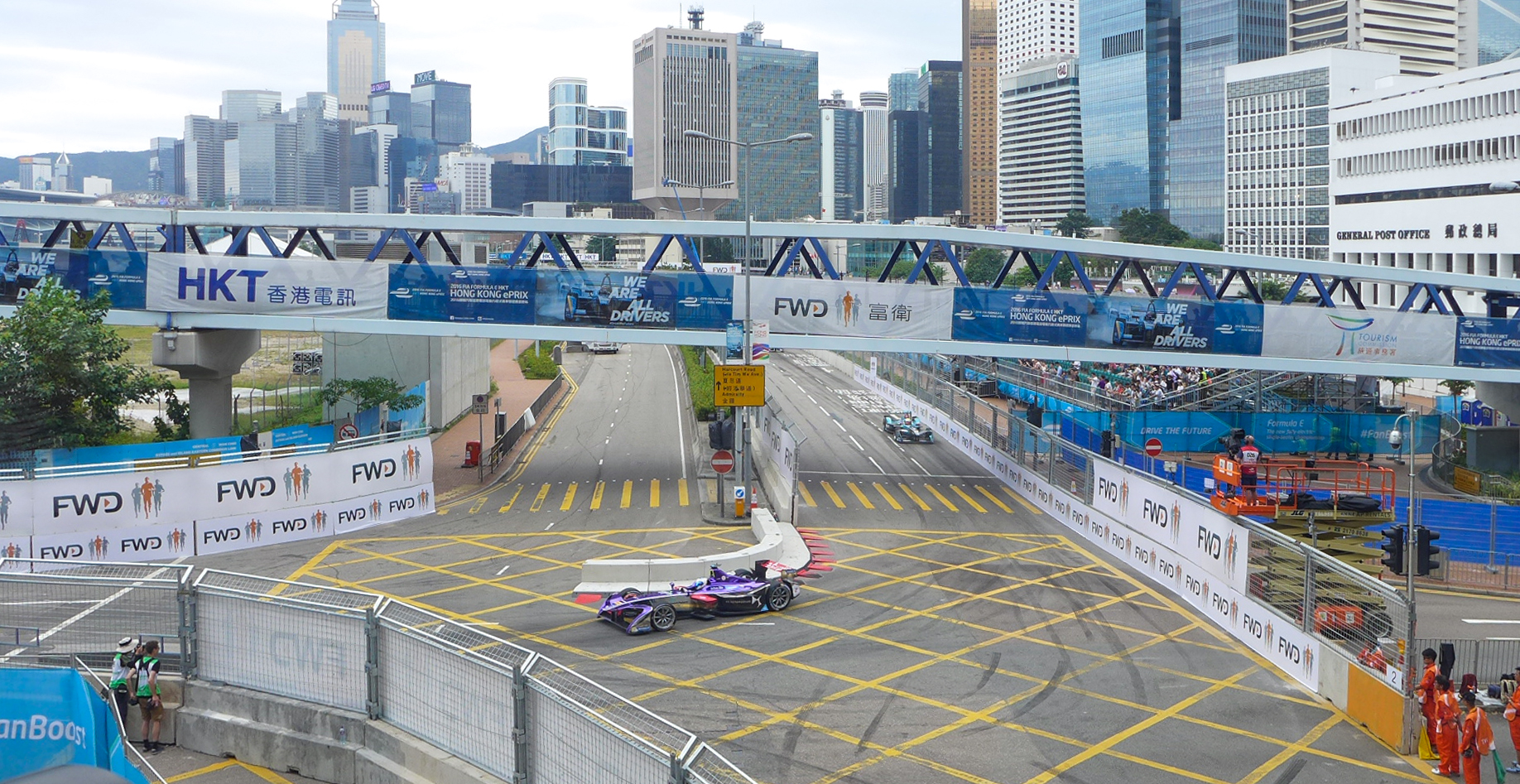
The Hong Kong Central Harbourfront Circuit (pictured in 2016), where the race was held.

The Hong Kong ePrix was confirmed as part of Formula E's 2017–18 series schedule in September 2017 by the FIA World Motor Sport Council. They were the first and second of twelve scheduled single-seater electric car races of the 2017–18 Championship, and the second running of the event, The ePrix was granted double header status for the first time by motor racing's world governing body, the Fédération Internationale de l'Automobile (FIA). Additionally, the event was the first Asian double header round in Formula E history and was held on 2 and 3 December 2017 at the Hong Kong Central Harbourfront Circuit. Organisers expected that 41,000 people would attend the race. Construction of the track started on 23 November, nine days before the first race. After the 2016 race, the turn three and four chicane was tightened in an attempt to reduce the likelihood of accidents there.

Heading into the new season, some teams opted to keep the same line-up as they had in the previous season; however, some teams switched drivers or changed names. ABT Audi Sport became Audi Sport ABT to reflect the increased manufacturer involvement from Audi. Faraday Future ended their partnership with Dragon Racing and NextEV NIO's name was shortened to become NIO. 2011 Formula Nippon title winner and 2012 World Endurance Champion André Lotterer was employed by Techeetah to replace Stéphane Sarrazin, while 2007–08 A1 Grand Prix champion and 2016 24 Hours of Le Mans co-winner Neel Jani took over Loïc Duval's seat at Dragon.

Former IndyCar Series podium finisher and Blancpain GT Endurance Series racer Luca Filippi joined Oliver Turvey at NIO, replacing Nelson Piquet Jr. who left the team by enabling a performance clause and went to Jaguar to replace Adam Carroll. José María López's place at Virgin was taken over by 2014 GP3 Series champion and 2017 12 Hours of Sebring co-winner Alex Lynn, while 2010 Formula 3 Euro Series champion and two-time Macau Grand Prix winner Edoardo Mortara entered the series with Venturi. Deutsche Tourenwagen Masters driver Tom Blomqvist was due to replace Robin Frijns at Andretti but his car was driven in Hong Kong by World Endurance Championship and Super Formula competitor Kamui Kobayashi. Defending drivers' champion Lucas di Grassi stayed at Audi after his title winning campaign and was again joined by Daniel Abt.

== Race one ==
=== Practice and qualifying ===
Two practice sessions—both on Saturday morning—were held before the late afternoon race. The first session ran for 45 minutes and the second lasted half an hour. Although drivers were concerned over the possibility of reduced visibility, Sébastien Buemi of e.Dams-Renault set the fastest time in the first practice session with a lap of 1 minute, 3.310 seconds at 200 kW (270 hp) of power, four-tenths of a second faster than any one else on the track. His closest challenger was Mitch Evans in second. The Audis of Abt and di Grassi, Sam Bird, Nico Prost, Piquet. Mortara, Jean-Éric Vergne and Turvey rounded out the session's top ten drivers. During the session, where several drivers struggled to find their preferred rhythm, Prost stopped on track with a battery management system glitch and restarted his car to continue driving. Later, Jani broke part of his car's front-left suspension in a collision with the turn ten inside wall but returned to the pit lane to switch into a second car. Lotterer glanced the same wall and damaged his car's front-right quarter. A short full course yellow flag was called for when Rosenqvist drove off the circuit at the final corner.

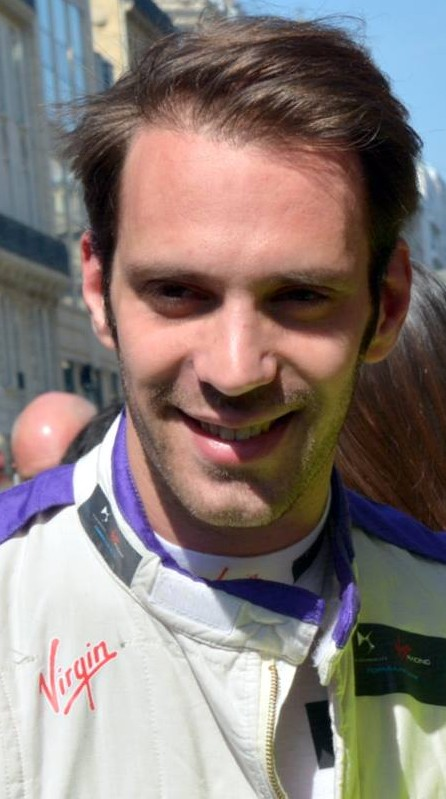
Jean-Éric Vergne (pictured in 2016) took his fifth pole position of his career in spite of spinning after completing his super pole lap.

In the second practice session, Evans set the fastest lap of the weekend so far at 1 minute, 2.875 seconds, and was two-tenths of a second quicker than Abt in second. His Audi teammate di Grassi, Turvey, Nick Heidfeld (Mahindra), Bird. Piquet, Rosenqvist, Prost and António Félix da Costa completed the top ten. Buemi locked his rear tyres at the turn six hairpin after going onto some dirt, and oversteered into the barrier six minutes in, causing superficial damage to his car's steering. Heidfeld hit the turn ten barrier while on his maximum power lap and Maro Engel slid onto the turn two run-off area. Yellow flags were waved with five minutes left when Mortara stopped his car on track at the second turn and ended all competitive running in the session.

Saturday's afternoon qualifying session ran for an hour and was divided into four groups of five cars. Each group was determined by a lottery system and was permitted six minutes of on-track activity. All drivers were limited to two timed laps with one at maximum power. The fastest five overall competitors in the four groups participated in a "Super Pole" session with one driver on the track at any time going out in reverse order from fifth to first. Each of the five drivers was limited to one timed lap and the starting order was determined by the competitor's fastest times (Super Pole from first to fifth, and group qualifying from sixth to twentieth). The driver and team who recorded the fastest time were awarded three points towards their respective championships., Buemi led the first group, ahead of early benchmark setter Lotterer and Engel. Mortara was on a fast lap but Lynn's loose car delayed him, and Mortara twice struck the barrier. Lynn took fourth and Mortara was the first group's slowest driver. Bird set the fastest overall lap time in the second group at 1 minute, 3.276 seconds, while Félix da Costa in second was quickest until Bird's lap. Kobayashi was third despite hitting the barrier and Filippi was fourth. Evans was group two's slowest driver after failing to set a maximum power lap due to him not crossing the start-finish line after an inter-team miscommunication. In the third group, Heidfeld had more on-circuit grip and was fastest, demoting Vergne to second. Rosenqvist was third-fastest and Piquet and Jani (who aborted his maximum power lap) were the third group's slowest runners.

Prost struck the turn five barrier in group four and collected a trackside sponsorship banner that entangled on his front wing and then his rear wheel. Despite littering debris on the track, marshals did not wave yellow flags, and Jérôme d'Ambrosio collected the barrier which wrapped around his front-left wheel, stopping the session. When qualifying restarted, Abt ended the group fastest and prevented his teammate di Grassi from progressing to super pole. Turvey was third and d'Ambrosio fourth. The stewards did not allow Prost to continue in qualifying and was the fourth group's slowest driver. At the end of group qualifying, the times set by Bird, Heidfeld, Vergne, Rosenqvist and Abt advanced them into super pole. Vergne took the first pole position of the season and the fifth of his career with a lap of 1 minute, 3.568 seconds. As he completed his lap, Vergne lost control of his car at the final turn, slightly damaging it from contact with the outside wall, and stopped after the timing line. Vergne's spin meant his in-lap was more than 120 per cent of his qualifying time but was not penalised since he was deemed not to have been a danger to others. Vergne was joined on the grid's front row by Bird who made a small error at the second hairpin. Heidfeld qualified third. Abt set a benchmark time that put him on provisional pole but fell to fourth. Rosenqvist, fifth, locked his brakes at the first hairpin and ran wide. After qualifying, Jani was demoted ten places on the grid for changing his car's battery after his first practice crash. Following the application of Jani's penalty, the remainder of the grid consisted of di Grassi, Turvey, Félix da Costa, Buemi, Piquet, d'Ambrosio, Lotterer, Kobayashi, Engel, Filippi, Lynn, Prost, Mortara, Evans and Jani.

=== Race ===
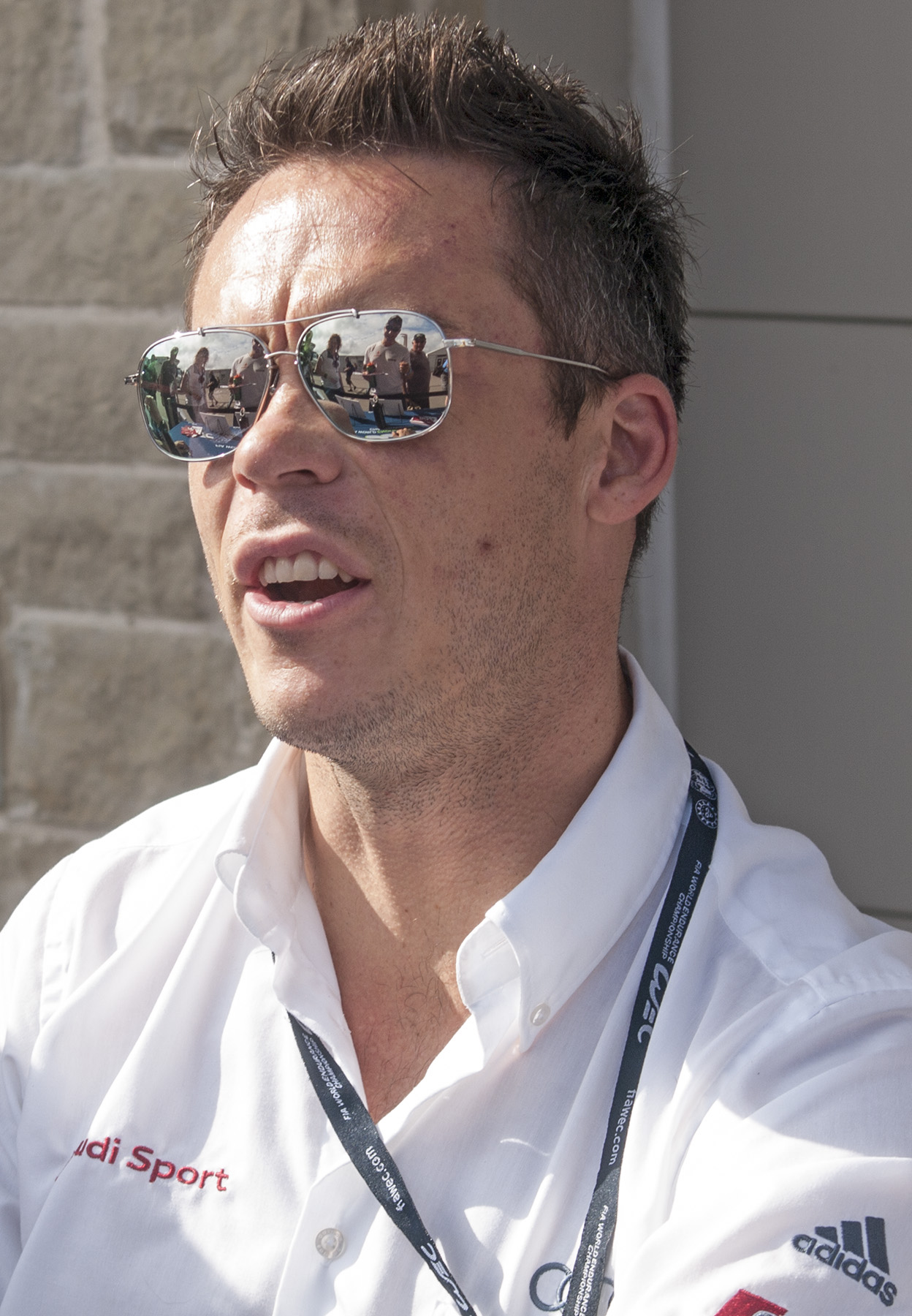
André Lotterer (pictured in 2014) was involved in a multi-car collision which prompted Formula E's first race stoppage in its history.

The weather at the start of the race were dry and warm with the air temperature between 23 and 23.9 °C (73.4 and 75.0 °F) and the track temperature ranged from 27.2 to 28.3 °C (81.0 to 82.9 °F). A special feature of Formula E is the "Fan Boost" feature, an additional 100 kW (130 hp) of power to use in the driver's second car. The three drivers who were allowed to use the boost were determined by a fan vote. For the first Hong Kong race, Kobayashi, Abt and Filippi were handed the extra power. When the race began from its standing start at 15:00 Hong Kong Time (UTC+08:00), Vergne maintained his pole position advantage heading towards the first corner with Bird remaining in second position. Heidfeld launched an attack for the lead of the ePrix but ran wide and fell to fourth after failing to get past Bird. Turvey steered onto the outside line and moved from seventh to third pass Rosenqvist, di Grassi, Abt and Heidfeld at the first turn as the majority of the field went defensive.

The field negotiated the first two corners without incident, but a track blockage at the turn three and four chicane prompted the race director to stop the race for the first time in Formula E history. Piquet drove over the kerbs on the inside of the turn three and four chicane and Lotterer (who was attempting to swerve to avoid the traffic) was caught out and drove into the barrier. Prost, Evans, Mortara and Jani were all forced to stop on track, while the rest of the field entered the pit lane and awaited further instruction from the race director. Shortly after, the drivers who were stranded at the first chicane were allowed to drive back onto the circuit so that they could line up in the correct running order. The race restarted after more than a half hour delay under the safety car for one lap. Vergne led at the restart, followed by Bird who immediately duelled him. Di Grassi immediately began attacking his teammate Abt by turning right in the second corner but did not pass him.

On lap five, Buemi attacked di Grassi by driving on the inside line going into the first turn and the two made contact since di Grassi drove defensively and gave Buemi a small amount of room. At the same time, Filippi closed up to Rosenqvist but sent the latter into a spin at the first corner, dropping Rosenqvist to 15th position and damaging his radiator. Heidfeld attempted to overtake Turvey around the outside heading towards the second corner but Heidfeld locked his brakes which meant he could not complete the move. Consequently, this loss of momentum allowed Abt to draw alongside Heidfeld and moved past him for fourth. Di Grassi and Buemi got involved in the battle for third place shortly afterwards. Di Grassi was the first driver to enter the pit lane on the sixteenth lap because Audi claimed that his right-rear suspension had sustained damage from his earlier contact with Buemi. Di Grassi switched into his second car soon after but this would leave him with less electrical energy than the rest of the field.

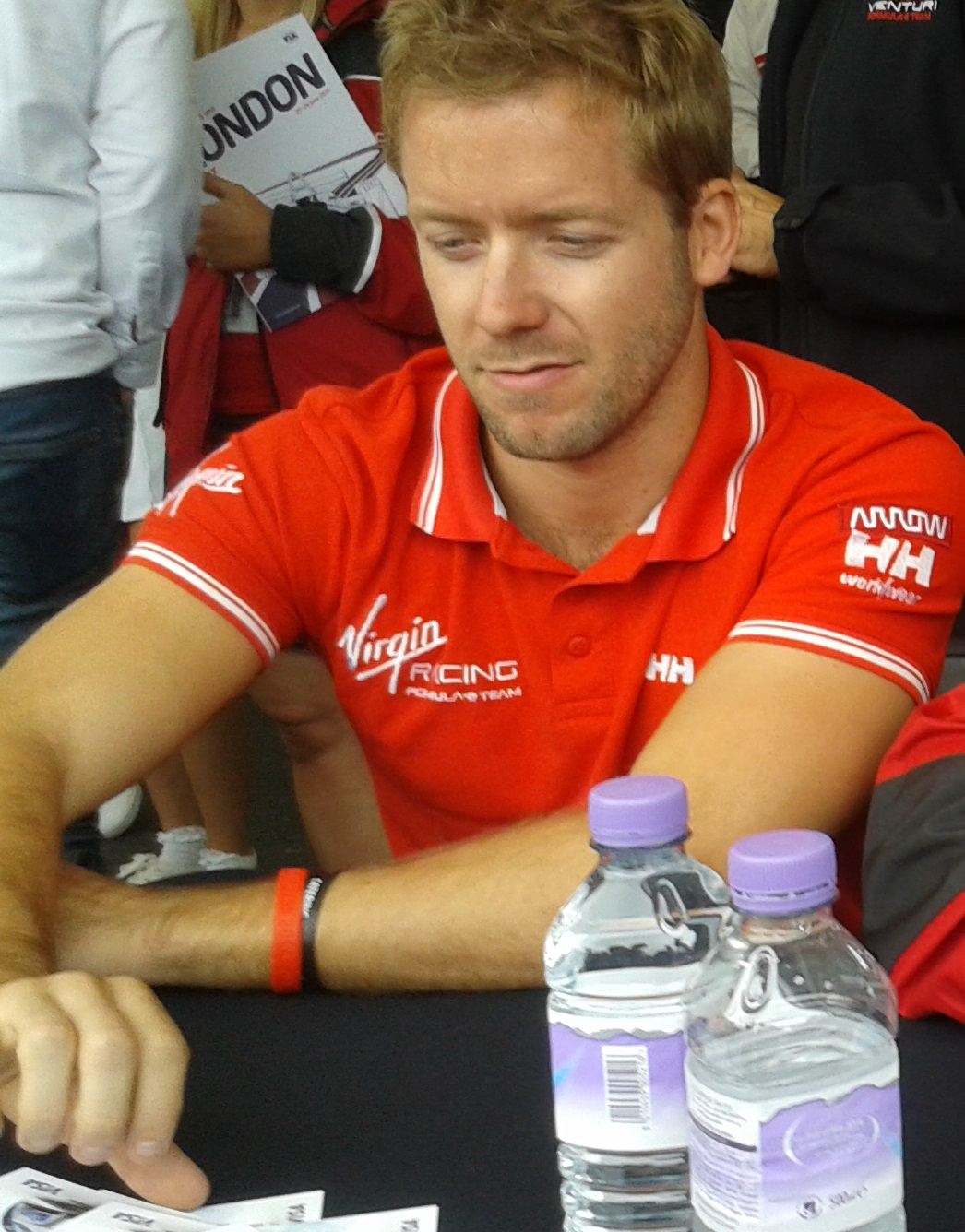
Sam Bird (pictured in 2015) won his first race of the season by despite a drive-through penalty for missing his garage.

Turvey had not been able to remain with the leading two drivers but slowed suddenly with a technical problem and drove to the pit lane to switch into his second car. Vergne and Bird led the rest of the field by nine seconds. After initially failing to pass Vergne, Bird turned right and passed him for first at turn seven on lap 20. Vergne entered the pit lane on lap 21 for the mandatory switch into his second car while Bird completed one extra lap. When Bird made his pit stop, he locked his tyres on some dust, and slid into the side of his garage. Bird hit team equipment and narrowly avoided injuring a Virgin Racing staff member. Bird abandoned his car at the side of the garage but kept the lead. After the pit stops, Bird led Vergne by seven seconds, who was followed in turn, by Engel, Piquet and Rosenqvist. Abt lost the most places due to a technical error which lost him 20 seconds and fell to eighth.

After his pit stop, Buemi's car shut down due to a technical issue at the exit of the first turn and stopped in the centre of the track. Buemi was able to restart his vehicle quickly but fell to 13th position. Since Bird did not park his car inside his garage during his pit stop, he incurred a drive-through penalty but the short length of the pit lane and his large lead allowed him to narrowly remain ahead of Vergne after taking it. Rosenqvist was close behind Engel in a battle for fourth place. The duo came into contact at the turn three and four chicane which saw Rosenqvist run into Engel but both drivers avoided the wall. Heidfeld drew alongside Vergne at the turn two hairpin but the latter locked his brakes and ran deep, preventing Heidfeld from passing him. Lotterer incurred with a drive-through penalty that was related to his first lap multi-car collision as Filippi was similarly penalised for his earlier collision with Rosenqvist.

On the 42nd lap, Rosenqvist braked later than Piquet at the first corner and overtook him for fifth place. He closed up to Engel but was not near enough to pass him and fell to eighth while conserving electrical energy. Bird crossed the start-finish line in first place after 43 laps to clinch his first victory of the season and the sixth of his career. Vergne followed 11.575 seconds later in second and Heidfeld was third. Off the podium, Engel originally finished fourth but was penalised with a time penalty for overusing energy and dropped to 13th. Piquet finished fourth, Abt fifth, Félix da Costa sixth and Mortara was the highest-placed rookie in seventh. Rosenqvist lost his eighth-place result after being adjudged to have overused power and dropped to 14th. Lynn, Prost and Filippi rounded out the top-ten. Buemi, Evans, Engel, Rosenqvist, Kobayashi, Turvey, di Grassi and Jani completed the finishing order. Lotterer was deemed to have left his car in an unsafe position under parc fermé conditions and was disqualified from the race. The sole non-classified finisher was d'Ambrosio who pulled to the side of the circuit with a mechanical failure and later retired after rejoining.

=== Post-race ===
The top three drivers appeared on the podium to collect their trophies and spoke to the media in a later press conference. Bird spoke about the erratic nature of the race and said it was "unreal" for him to have won after taking his drive-through penalty He also admitted the race had stressed him but relished its competitive nature despite the first-lap stoppage: "Welcome to Formula E. That's like a normal race for us. We've had some crazy races in the past, you only have to look at the first ever race in the series and the crash at the last corner." Vergne said it was the most difficult race of his career because he lacked radio communication and battery regeneration: "So, if this morning somebody told me I’d have these issues, I wouldn’t even take the start of the race. To finish second off the back of this is almost like a victory to us. We’re hoping to fix things overnight and come back stronger tomorrow." Heidfeld stated that his third-place was a result he was least happy with but praised his team.

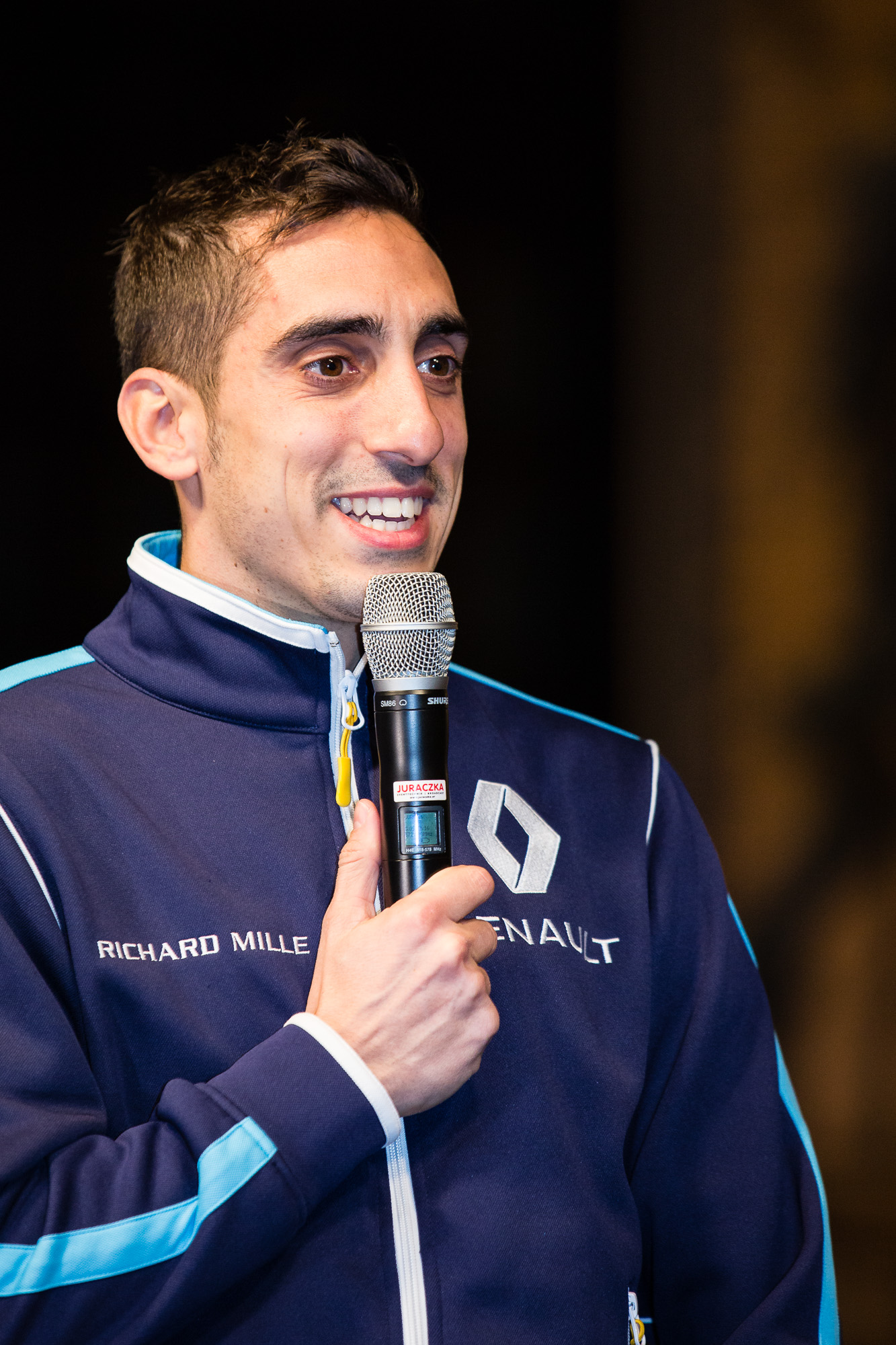
Sébastien Buemi (pictured in 2016) criticised Lucas di Grassi's defensive driving in the early part of the ePrix.

Vergne's defensive move at the turn three and four chicane drew criticism from Heidfeld who claimed Vergne broke series rules for his driving that the two discussed. Heidfled was unhappy when Vergne told him that he believed the manoeuvres were acceptable. Vergne argued that he was not at fault because he did not wish to undertake an action that would have jeopardised his chances of a championship duel and wanted to the finish the race: "Sometimes you have to finish second and third or fourth, but take the points. And at the end of the year they will count." Buemi was critical of di Grassi's driving, believing that the latter should have ceded the position once they reached the corner. He revealed he attempted to drive as close as he could towards the barrier without hitting it but found di Grassi's driving too aggressive: "The corner is very tight, but I am there, you cannot just do the corner – and he just does the corner. He turns, so I end up pushing him and damaging both cars. If I'm beside you it's a bit difficult. What should I do? I cannot do anything." Di Grassi ignored Buemi's criticism and clarified his right-rear suspension was damaged from his contact with Abt instead of Buemi's hit as had been initially reported by Audi.

It was discovered after the race that several drivers had poor radio reception due to the local skyscrapers, prompting them to recalculate their regeneration and electrical energy usage without assistance. Abt likened the situation to Formula 4 racing while Piquet believed he could have improved on his fourth-place had his radio functioned correctly. Jani said the lack of communication in his first race hindered him as he did not have the knowledge of what his regeneration targets were and Rosenqvist agreed the situation was unexpected and hard to deal with. Lynn revealed his team had been previously affected in a prior race and were better prepared for a similar situation. Bird was told to see the stewards after the race and was given a ten-place grid penalty for the following day's race for not stopping in the garage during his pit stop. Virgin team principal Alex Tai told the press that he sought an answer of whether Bird's penalty was appealable but chose to follow instructions since that would be difficult to do. Engel revealed his issue was caused by a loss of electrical power between the first and second turns every lap which allowed Rosenqvist to attack him.

As a consequence of the final positions, Bird led the Drivers' Championship with 25 points. Vergne was four points behind in second place, Heidfeld was third with 15 points and Piquet followed a further three points behind in fourth place. With 11 points, Abt was fifth. In the Teams' Championship, Virgin became the early leaders on 29 points with both their drivers finishing in the top ten. Vergne's pole position and second-place finish earned the second-placed Techeetah 21 points and Mahindra were a further six points adrift in third. Jaguar were fourth with 12 points and Audi on 11 points were fifth.

=== Standings after the race ===
Drivers' Championship standings

Pos	Driver	Points
1	(United Kingdom) Sam Bird	25
2	(France) Jean-Éric Vergne	21 (−4)
3	(Germany) Nick Heidfeld	15 (−10)
4	(Brazil) Nelson Piquet Jr.	12 (−13)
5	(Germany) Daniel Abt	11 (−14)

Teams' Championship standings

Pos	Constructor	Points
1	(United Kingdom) Virgin-Citroën	29
2	(China) Techeetah-Renault	21 (−8)
3	(India) Mahindra	15 (−14)
4	(United Kingdom) Jaguar	12 (−17)
5	(Germany) Audi	11 (−18)

- Notes: Only the top five positions are included for both sets of standings.

== Race two ==
2017 Hong Kong ePrix
Race 2 of 12 of the 2017–18 Formula E Championship
Next race →
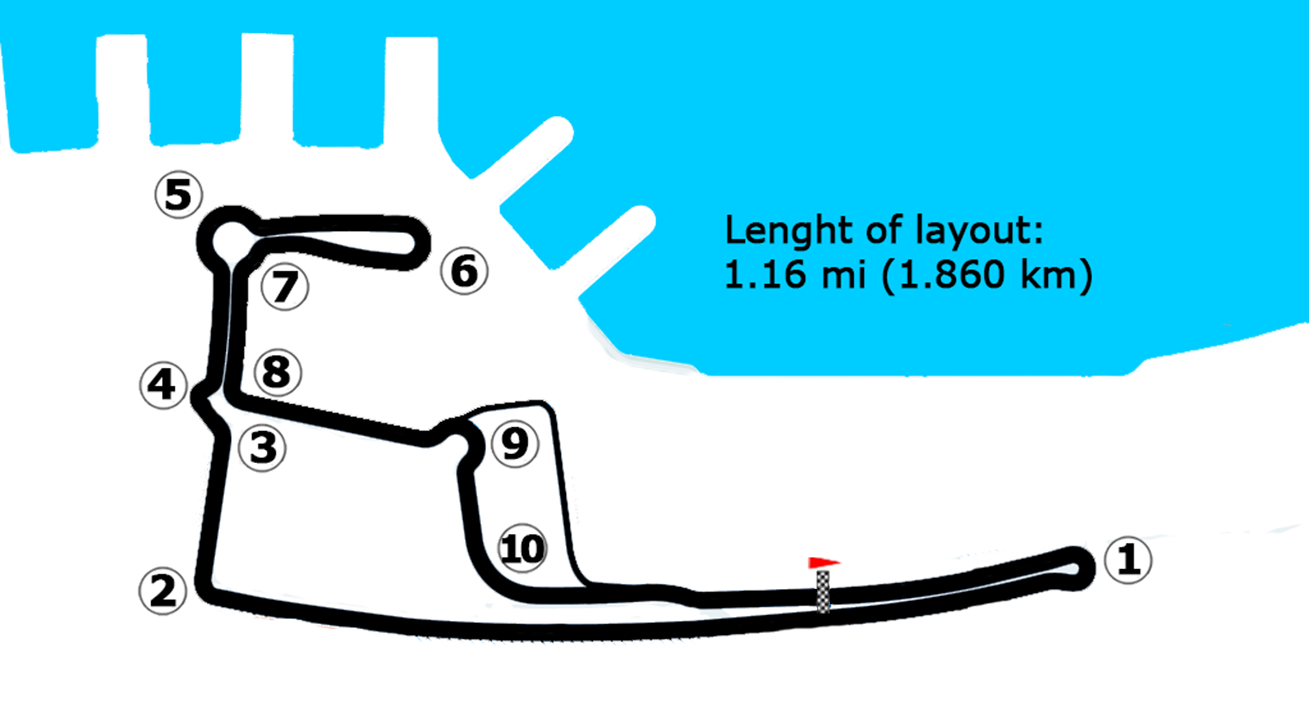

Race details
- Date: 3 December 2017
- Official name: 2017 FIA Formula E HKT Hong Kong ePrix
- Location: Hong Kong Central Harbourfront Circuit, Hong Kong
- Course: Street circuit
- Course length: 1.860 miles (2.993 km)
- Distance: 45 laps, 83.70 miles (134.70 km)
- Weather: Sunny

Pole position
Driver	(Sweden) Felix Rosenqvist	Mahindra
- Time: 1:02.836

Fastest lap
Driver	(Brazil) Lucas di Grassi	Audi
- Time: 1:03.928 on lap 27

Podium
First	(Sweden) Felix Rosenqvist	Mahindra
Second	(Switzerland) Edoardo Mortara	Venturi
Third	(New Zealand) Mitch Evans	Jaguar

=== Practice and qualifying ===
One 45-minute practice session on Sunday morning was held before the early afternoon race. Buemi bested Evans's fastest lap of the weekend to go fastest in the third practice session with a time of 1 minute, 2.002 seconds; Lynn followed three-tenths of a second behind in second. Di Grassi, Vergne, Bird, Rosenqvist, Abt, Mortara, Heidfeld and Turvey made up position three to ten. During practice, where several drivers locked their brakes and drove onto the track's run-off areas, Engel briefly stopped at the first turn but no red flag was necessitated since he restarted his car in time. Prost narrowly avoided being caught out by Turvey who lost control of his car's rear at turn nine while passing the former and d'Ambrosio hit Prost's vehicle and dislodged its right-rear fender at the corner's apex. Prost was able to drive back to the pit lane but voiced his anger over the radio. Buemi slowed to avoid hitting debris at the turn three and four chicane and impeded the faster Félix da Costa with the pair gesticulating.

In contrast to the first race, the lottery system was changed with the top five drivers in the championship put in the first group and lower ranked competitors drawn in order in the three remaining groups. This was changed to allow drives to remain close to each other and stop significant variables such as changeable weather from affecting the starting order. In the first qualifying group of five runners, Turvey paced the session with di Grassi a quarter of a second slower in second. Lotterer, d'Ambrosio and the early benchmark setter Jani rounded out the first group's slowest drivers. D'Ambrosio noted that the driving in group one was difficult due a Roborace demonstration that took place between the third practice and second qualifying sessions leaving debris on the track. In the second group, Rosenqvist moved straight to provisional pole but Evans's was quickest overall with a lap of 1 minute, 2.577 seconds. Rosenqvist was second, Engel third and Kobayashi fourth. Buemi was group two's slowest driver as he was off the pace due to him damaging his car with a glance of the turn five inside barrier; he began from the back of the field for the first time since the 2016 Buenos Aires ePrix. Mortara was fastest in the third group, followed by Lynn, Félix da Costa. Filippi, and early pace setter Prost. In the fourth group, Abt set a lap that moved him to second overall The fourth group's four slowest participants were Bird, Vergne, Heidfeld and Piquet. At the end of group qualifying, the lap times set by Evans, Abt, Mortara, Rosenqvist and Bird advanced them into super pole. Despite an oversteer in the final sector, Rosenqvist drove aggressively to take his fourth career pole position with a lap of 1 minute, 2.836 seconds. He was joined on the grid's front row by Evans who was faster than Rosenqvist earlier in his lap. Despite ruining his preparation at the end of his warm-up lap and an error at turn one, Mortara took third and Bird was fourth in his attempt to minimise the effect of his grid penalty. Abt bent his car's steering arm from minor contact with a wall and a slow pace put him fifth. After qualifying, Evans's super pole time was deleted because he was deemed to have overused electrical power and Bird began from 13th. The rest of the grid lined up after penalties as Lynn, Félix da Costa, Vergne, Turvey, Filippi, Heidfeld, Piquet, di Grassi, Bird, Prost, Engel, Kobayashi, Lotterer, d'Ambrosio, Jani and Buemi.

=== Race ===
The second race started at 15:00 local time. The weather at the start were dry and sunny with the air temperature ranging from 23.25 and 23.9 °C (73.85 and 75.02 °F) and a track temperature between 27.2 and 28.35 °C (80.96 and 83.03 °F). As in the first ePrix, the winners of the FanBoost vote were Abt, Kobayashi and Filippi. On the grid, a circuit board failure resulted in the five red lights gantry failing to illuminate, causing the entire field to remain in their starting positions as they awaited a signal from the race director Scot Elkins. Three minutes later, race control elected to use the safety car to start the race. Rosenqvist led the field up to speed but locked his rear brakes heading towards the turn one hairpin and half-spun, falling to eleventh. This gave Mortara the lead and Abt moved into second position. More action took place further down the field as drivers got close to each other but all made it through without any trouble. Filippi's track rod fractured early on and later became the race's only retiree after entering the pit lane. At the end of the second lap, Mortara led from Abt, Evans, Lynn, Félix da Costa, Vergne, Turvey, Piquet, Prost and Bird.

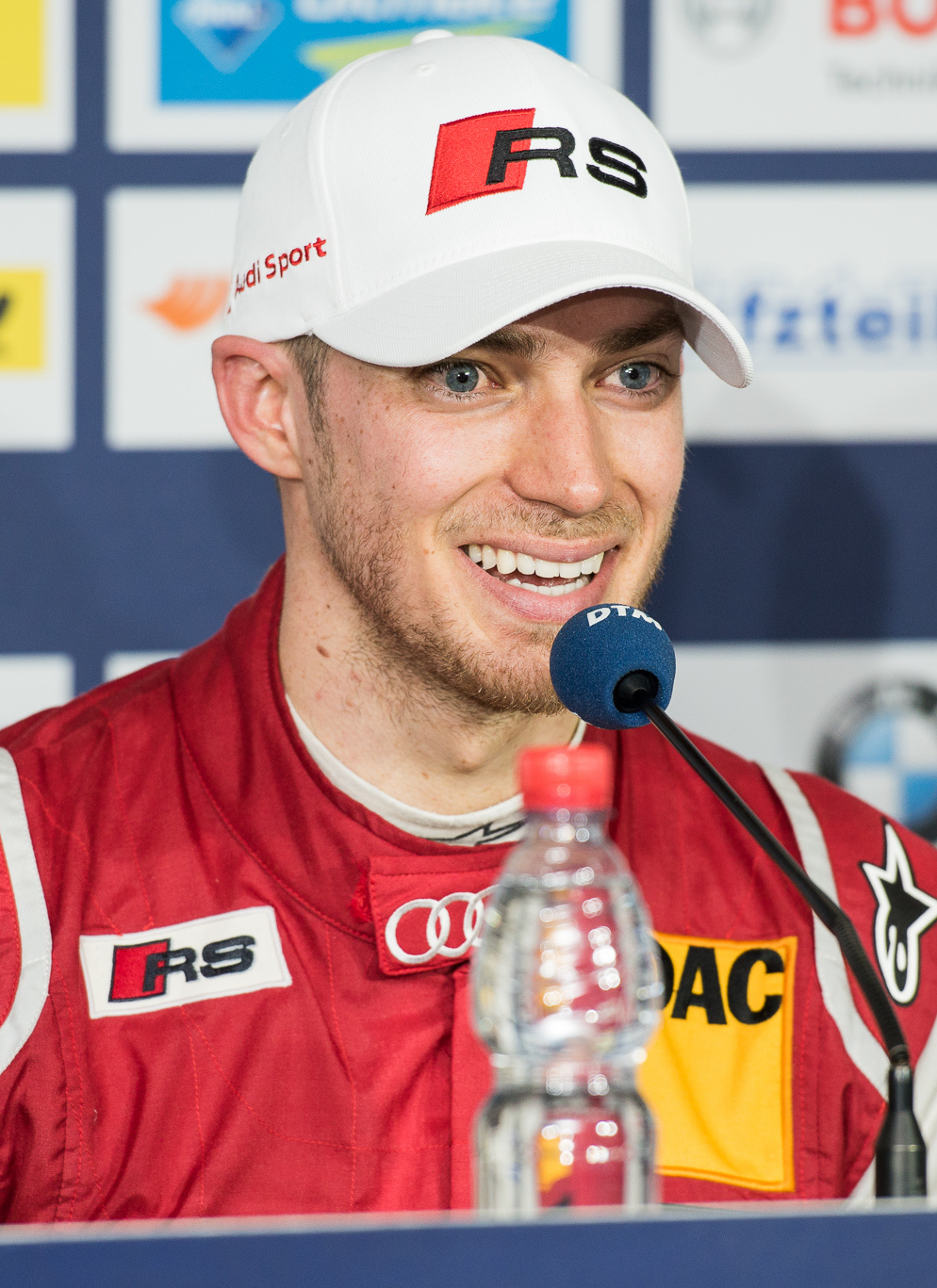
Edoardo Mortara (pictured in 2014) led the majority of the second race but lost the victory after spinning on the 43rd lap.

Early movement within first to fifth occurred as Félix da Costa overtook Lynn around the outside for fourth place while Bird moved from fourteenth to ninth by the start of the fifth lap. On the following lap, Mahindra suffered further problems when Heidfeld slowed and drove to the side of the circuit with a technical issue but was later able to get the fault rectified and continued racing. Upfront, Mortara opened up a four-second advantage over Abt, while Rosenqvist began to move up the field and Buemi and di Grassi struggled in the non-points scoring positions. Abt looked to lessen Mortara's lead but the latter was better managing his electrical energy usage and began to increase his advantage as the pit stop phase was getting closer. Soon after, Heideld delayed Mortara as he seemed to not realise that the race leader was about to lap him. The mandatory pit stops for the switch into a second car began on the 23rd lap when Mortara entered the pit lane with one percent of usable electrical energy. Félix da Costa and Lynn stayed on the circuit for one additional lap before the duo made their pit stops. Soon after his pit stop, di Grassi stopped temporarily at the side of the track at turn six with a battery management system fault. He fell to 17th after restarting his car.

After the pit stops, Mortara kept the lead and was now three-and-a-half-seconds in front of Abt. Rosenqvist made up the most positions and moved to third. Félix da Costa's second car had trouble starting and this required a full reset that dropped him to 14th. Similarly, Evans lost four seconds at his pit stop due to a problem with his second car and fell from third to fourth. Mortara was soon placed under pressure by Heidfeld who was making an attempt to unlap himself. Mortara responded by defending as if he was battling for position but was later informed over the radio that this was not the case. Numerous battles occurred in the middle of the field with Bird and Vergne close to each other while Buemi had moved up the order to run in eleventh place. Rosenqvist drew closer to Abt at the rate of half a second per lap and was five seconds adrift with eight laps left. However, Abt responded to Rosenqvist's faster pace to remain in third. Mortara had more usable electrical energy but Abt was able to close up on him and the lead was reduced to two seconds. Mortara used this to his advantage to set personal best lap times and give him a three-second advantage in the closing stages and it appeared he would take his and Venturi's first Formula E win.

However, on lap 43, just as Abt used his FanBoost on the back straight, Mortara endured difficulty with his regenerative braking system, and lost control of his car's rear at the second turn but avoided hitting a wall. This promoted Abt into the lead which he held for the final two laps to finish first on the road for would have been his maiden Formula E victory and his first in motor racing since the 2012 GP3 Series. Rosenqvist completed his recovery and took second while Mortara came back from his late race spin to complete the podium in third. Off the podium, Evans finished in fourth to match Jaguar's best result in Formula E and Vergne followed in fifth. Bird lost out in his battle with Vergne and was sixth. Turvey, Engel and Prost all had quiet races and followed in positions seven to nine. Lynn was more economical with using electrical energy and eventually slowed to take tenth because he could not overtake Evans. Buemi, Félix da Costa and Piquet followed in the next three placings. Lotterer swerved to avoid Piquet on the inside lane for turn ten, and speared into the exit barriers, heavily damaging his car's front-right corner. Lotterer crossed the timing beam in 14th. Di Grassi, d'Ambrosio, Heidfeld, Kobayashi and Jani were the final classified finishers.

=== Post-race ===
Three hours after the race, it was announced by the FIA stewards that Abt's car was not compliant with the Formula E technical regulations. They discovered that the FIA security stickers on the car's inverter and the motor-generator unit did not match those declared on the vehicle's technical passport provided to the team for the ePrix. Audi team principal Allan McNish suspected an administrative error and announced the team's intention to file an appeal with the FIA International Tribunal in Paris to clarify the details surrounding the mix-up. The next day, Audi scrutinised all documents and processes and determined that Abt gained no advantage as a result and all parts of the car were fully homologated. The team accepted the FIA's decision and apologised to Abt for the error. The consequence of the decision meant Rosenqvist inherited the second victory of his career with Mortara second and Evans taking Jaguar's first Formula E podium. Additionally, Audi were fined €5,000 ($5,944) after five of its team personnel convened to the podium via the circuit before the final car had reached parc fermé, deemed by the stewards to be "serious breach of safety regulations".

Rosenqvist was happy to win the race but was sympathetic to Abt: "It’s not the way you want to win and I don’t feel like I’ve won the race. But I’m happy with the points. Sometimes you’re happy and then you’re sad, like yesterday we were in P15 and turned it around – getting fastest lap but it got taken away, so there’s been a lot like that but I’ll take maximum points and third in the championship." Second-placed Mortara acknowledged he was possibly overconfident as he sought the additional point for setting the fastest lap along with the victory and vowed to be calmer at the season's next race: "It’s... difficult to find the words actually, after a race like that. It’s tough to swallow actually, today. We had the pace, we were managing the race from the beginning to the end – I was pretty much 100% all through the race, to keep the gap with Daniel and I was choosing when to push." Evans was proud to take Jaguar's first Formula E podium but that it was regretful as Abt is a close friend of his.

According to Buemi, an unexplained issue with his car's chassis compromised his speed over the race weekend and that his team did not have the knowledge on how to rectify it. He also confirmed to the press that the same problem affected all four of his vehicles. Di Grassi was frustrated with the problems of his vehicle: "The car is strong, we have the potential, we have to figure it out. Saturday we lost a fourth place or a fifth place easy, Sunday we lost again at least another fifth or fourth place. It is just frustrating because of small details which are sometimes out of our control." Lotterer said his first lap incident in the first race was him being in "the wrong place at the wrong time” but he was encouraged over a battle he had with Buemi in the next race and was eager to discover how his team's performance could be improved for future races. Jani said that it had been quite some time since a teammate of his out-performed him but spoke of his satisfaction to improve his performance following Saturday's race. Félix da Costa spoke of his disappointment over the result as he believed he could have come second had his pit stop not been slow.

The result meant Bird remained the Drivers' Championship leader on 36 points but his advantage over Vergne was reduced from six to two points. Rosenqvist's victory gained him third position with 29 points and Mortara's second-place finish moved him to fourth. Heidfeld's non-points scoring finish dropped him to fifth and was tied with Evans on points. Mahindra's result enabled them to move into the lead of the Teams' Championship with 44 points, three ahead of Virgin in second place. Techeetah fell to third while Venturi's strong performance allowed the team to move into fourth. Jaguar rounded out the top five with ten races left in the season. 27,000 people attended the two-day event.

=== Standings after the race ===
Drivers' Championship standings

+/–	Pos	Driver	Points
	1	(United Kingdom) Sam Bird	35
	2	(France) Jean-Éric Vergne	33 (−2)
11	3	(Sweden) Felix Rosenqvist	29 (−6)
3	4	(Switzerland) Edoardo Mortara	24 (−11)
2	5	(Germany) Nick Heidfeld	15 (−20)

Teams' Championship standings

+/–	Pos	Constructor	Points
1	1	(India) Mahindra	44
1	2	(United Kingdom) Virgin-Citroën	41 (−3)
	3	(China) Techeetah-Renault	33 (−11)
3	4	(Monaco) Venturi	30 (−14)
1	5	(United Kingdom) Jaguar	27 (−17)

- Notes: Only the top five positions are included for both sets of standings.

== Classification ==
=== Qualifying one ===
Final first qualifying classification
Pos.	No.	Driver	Team	GS	SP	Grid
1	25	(France) Jean-Éric Vergne	Techeetah-Renault	1:03.403	1:03.568	1
2	2	(United Kingdom) Sam Bird	Virgin-Citroën	1:03.276	1:03.595	2
3	23	(Germany) Nick Heidfeld	Mahindra	1:03.350	1:03.597	3
4	66	(Germany) Daniel Abt	Audi	1:03.561	1:03.724	4
5	19	(Sweden) Felix Rosenqvist	Mahindra	1:03.466	1:04.718	5
6	1	(Brazil) Lucas di Grassi	Audi	1:03.773	—N/a	6
7	16	(United Kingdom) Oliver Turvey	NIO	1:03.881	—N/a	7
8	28	(Portugal) António Félix da Costa	Andretti-BMW	1:03.914	—N/a	8
9	9	(Switzerland) Sébastien Buemi	e.Dams-Renault	1:03.966	—N/a	9
10	3	(Brazil) Nelson Piquet Jr.	Jaguar	1:03.993	—N/a	10
11	7	(Belgium) Jérôme d'Ambrosio	Dragon-Penske	1:04.405	—N/a	11
12	18	(Germany) André Lotterer	Techeetah-Renault	1:04.423	—N/a	12
13	27	(Monaco) Kamui Kobayashi (Note: Kobayashi is a Japanese driver who raced under a Monégasque racing license.)	Andretti-BMW	1:04.806	—N/a	13
14	5	(Germany) Maro Engel	Venturi	1:04.907	—N/a	14
15	68	(Italy) Luca Filippi	NIO	1:05.450	—N/a	15
16	36	(United Kingdom) Alex Lynn	Virgin-Citroën	1:05.544	—N/a	16
17	6	(Switzerland) Neel Jani	Dragon-Penske	1:05.615	—N/a	20^{1}
18	8	(France) Nico Prost	e.Dams-Renault	1:07.745	—N/a	17
19	4	(Switzerland) Edoardo Mortara	Venturi	1:12.730	—N/a	18
20	20	(New Zealand) Mitch Evans	Jaguar	1:19.616	—N/a	19

Notes:

- **^1**— Neel Jani was demoted ten places for changing his car's battery following an accident in the first practice session.

=== Race one ===
Drivers who scored championship points are denoted in bold.

Final first race classification
Pos.	No.	Driver	Team	Laps	Time/Retired	Grid	Points
1	**2**	**(United Kingdom) Sam Bird**	**Virgin-Citroën**	**43**	**1:17:10.486**	**2**	25
2	**25**	**(France) Jean-Éric Vergne**	**Techeetah-Renault**	**43**	**+11.575**	**1**	18+3^{2}
3	**23**	**(Germany) Nick Heidfeld**	**Mahindra**	**43**	**+12.465**	**3**	15
4	**3**	**(Brazil) Nelson Piquet Jr.**	**Jaguar**	**43**	**+15.324**	**10**	12
5	**66**	**(Germany) Daniel Abt**	**Audi**	**43**	**+17.205**	**4**	10+1^{3}
6	**28**	**(Portugal) António Félix da Costa**	**Andretti-BMW**	**43**	**+18.083**	**8**	8
7	**4**	**(Switzerland) Edoardo Mortara**	**Venturi**	**43**	**+19.797**	**18**	6
8	**36**	**(United Kingdom) Alex Lynn**	**Virgin-Citroën**	**43**	**+20.904**	**16**	4
9	**8**	**(France) Nico Prost**	**e.Dams-Renault**	**43**	**+24.785**	**17**	2
10	**68**	**(Italy) Luca Filippi**	**NIO**	**43**	**+25.500**	**15**	1
**11**	9	(Switzerland) Sébastien Buemi	e.Dams-Renault	43	+26.202	9	
**12**	20	(New Zealand) Mitch Evans	Jaguar	43	+34.871	19	
**13**	5	(Germany) Maro Engel	Venturi	43	+35.752^{4}	14	
**14**	19	(Sweden) Felix Rosenqvist	Mahindra	43	+41.174^{4}	5	
**15**	27	(Monaco) Kamui Kobayashi	Andretti-BMW	43	+48.422	13	
**16**	16	(United Kingdom) Oliver Turvey	NIO	42	+1 Lap	7	
**17**	1	(Brazil) Lucas di Grassi	Audi	42	+1 Lap	6	
**18**	6	(Switzerland) Neel Jani	Dragon-Penske	42	+1 Lap	20	
Ret	7	(Belgium) Jérôme d'Ambrosio	Dragon-Penske	34	Technical	11	
DSQ	18	(Germany) André Lotterer	Techeetah-Renault	43	Disqualified^{4}	12	

Notes:

- **^2** — Three points for pole position.
- **^3** — One point for the fastest lap awarded to Daniel Abt as Jérôme d'Ambrosio did not finish in the top ten.
- **^4** — André Lotterer was disqualified for leaving his car in an unsafe condition under parc fermé conditions.

=== Qualifying two ===
Final second qualifying classification
Pos.	No.	Driver	Team	GS	SP	Grid
1	19	(Sweden) Felix Rosenqvist	Mahindra	1:02.878	1:02.836	1
2	4	(Switzerland) Edoardo Mortara	Venturi	1:02.870	1:03.108	2
3	2	(United Kingdom) Sam Bird	Virgin-Citroën	1:02.897	1:03.109	13^{5}
4	66	(Germany) Daniel Abt	Audi	1:02.703	1:03.715	3
5	20	(New Zealand) Mitch Evans	Jaguar	1:02.577	—^{6}	4
6	36	(United Kingdom) Alex Lynn	Virgin-Citroën	1:02.929	—N/a	5
7	28	(Portugal) António Félix da Costa	Andretti-BMW	1:02.979	—N/a	6
8	25	(France) Jean-Éric Vergne	Techeetah-Renault	1:02.982	—N/a	7
9	16	(United Kingdom) Oliver Turvey	NIO	1:03.092	—N/a	8
10	68	(Italy) Luca Filippi	NIO	1:03.210	—N/a	9
11	23	(Germany) Nick Heidfeld	Mahindra	1:03.276	—N/a	10
12	3	(Brazil) Nelson Piquet Jr.	Jaguar	1:03.310	—N/a	11
13	1	(Brazil) Lucas di Grassi	Audi	1:03.346	—N/a	12
14	8	(France) Nico Prost	e.Dams-Renault	1:03.418	—N/a	14
15	5	(Germany) Maro Engel	Venturi	1:03.446	—N/a	15
16	27	(Monaco) Kamui Kobayashi	Andretti-BMW	1:03.473	—N/a	16
17	18	(Germany) André Lotterer	Techeetah-Renault	1:03.845	—N/a	17
18	7	(Belgium) Jérôme d'Ambrosio	Dragon-Penske	1:03.849	—N/a	18
19	6	(Switzerland) Neel Jani	Dragon-Penske	1:04.612	—N/a	19
20	9	(Switzerland) Sébastien Buemi	e.Dams-Renault	1:05.346	—N/a	20

Notes:

- **^5** — Sam Bird was demoted ten places for not stopping in his garage during his mandatory pit stop in the first race.
- **^6** — Mitch Evans' super pole lap was deleted for exceeding the mandated maximum amount of electrical power usage.

=== Race two ===
Drivers who scored championship points are denoted in bold.

Final second race classification
Pos.	No.	Driver	Team	Laps	Time/Retired	Grid	Points
1	**19**	**(Sweden) Felix Rosenqvist**	**Mahindra**	**45**	**50:05.084**	**1**	25+3+1^{7} ^{8}
2	**4**	**(Switzerland) Edoardo Mortara**	**Venturi**	**45**	**+7.031**	**2**	18
3	**20**	**(New Zealand) Mitch Evans**	**Jaguar**	**45**	**+10.619**	**4**	15
4	**25**	**(France) Jean-Éric Vergne**	**Techeetah-Renault**	**45**	**+12.593**	**7**	12
5	**2**	**(United Kingdom) Sam Bird**	**Virgin-Citroën**	**45**	**+12.879**	**13**	10
6	**16**	**(United Kingdom) Oliver Turvey**	**NIO**	**45**	**+14.199**	**9**	8
7	**5**	**(Germany) Maro Engel**	**Venturi**	**45**	**+15.676**	**15**	6
8	**8**	**(France) Nico Prost**	**e.Dams-Renault**	**45**	**+18.905**	**14**	4
9	**36**	**(United Kingdom) Alex Lynn**	**Virgin-Citroën**	**45**	**+19.025**	**5**	2
10	**9**	**(Switzerland) Sébastien Buemi**	**e.Dams-Renault**	**45**	**+22.139**	**20**	1
**11**	28	(Portugal) António Félix da Costa	Andretti-BMW	45	+23.159	6	
**12**	3	(Brazil) Nelson Piquet Jr.	Jaguar	45	+27.104	11	
**13**	18	(Germany) André Lotterer	Techeetah-Renault	45	+28.591	17	
**14**	1	(Brazil) Lucas di Grassi	Audi	45	+39,137	12	
**15**	7	(Belgium) Jérôme d'Ambrosio	Dragon-Penske	45	+55,189	18	
**16**	23	(Germany) Nick Heidfeld	Mahindra	44	+1 Lap	10	
**17**	27	(Monaco) Kamui Kobayashi	Andretti-BMW	44	+ 1 Lap	16	
**18**	6	(Switzerland) Neel Jani	Dragon-Penske	44	+ 1 Lap	19	
Ret	68	(Italy) Luca Filippi	NIO	36	Track rod	9	
DSQ	66	(Germany) Daniel Abt	Audi	45	Disqualified**^{9}**	3	

Notes:

- **^7** — Three points for pole position.
- **^8** — Felix Rosenqvist won the one point for the fastest lap as Lucas di Grassi did not finish in the top ten.
- **^9** — Daniel Abt finished first on the track, but was disqualified after FIA stewards discovered the bar codes on his car's inverter and motor-generator unit did not match those on its technical passport provided to Audi.

== Notes and references ==
=== References ===
Previous race: 2017 Montreal ePrix	FIA Formula E Championship; 2017–18 season	Next race: 2018 Marrakesh ePrix
Previous race: 2016 Hong Kong ePrix	Hong Kong ePrix	Next race: 2019 Hong Kong ePrix
