= Arrival (company) =

U.K. electric vehicle company

- Formerly: Charge R&D Limited (2015–2016); Charge Automotive Ltd (2016–2017); Arrival Limited (2017–2022)
- Type: Public
- Traded as: Expert Market: ARVLF
- Industry: Automotive; Technology
- Founded: 2015; 11 years ago
- Founder: Denis Sverdlov
- Defunct: March 2024
- Fate: Entered administration, all items auctioned off 2024
- Headquarters: Howald, Luxembourg
- Area served: Worldwide
- Key people: Igor Torgov (CEO)
- Products: Electric vehicles
- Owner: Denis Sverdlov (35%)
- Number of employees: 800 (2023)
- Website: arrival.com

Arrival was a British electric vehicle manufacturer headquartered in Howald, Luxembourg that planned to build lightweight commercial vehicles. Research and development took place at a facility in Banbury, Oxfordshire.

After receiving $111 million in investment from Korean automaker Hyundai Motors and its sister company Kia Motors, it raised another $118 million from the American fund manager BlackRock in February 2020. Later, it was listed on Nasdaq after merging with special-purpose acquisition company CIIG Merger Corp.

After the company was delisted from Nasdaq and its UK division went into administration in February 2024, there were future plans to sell Arrival and all of its affiliated assets. After acquiring Arrival's assets in March 2024, the EV startup Canoo filed for Chapter 7 bankruptcy on January 17, 2025.

== Vehicles ==
According to Arrival, four electric vehicle types were being developed: a bus, a van, a large van, and a small vehicle platform. Start of production of the bus was planned for the last quarter of 2021.

=== Van ===
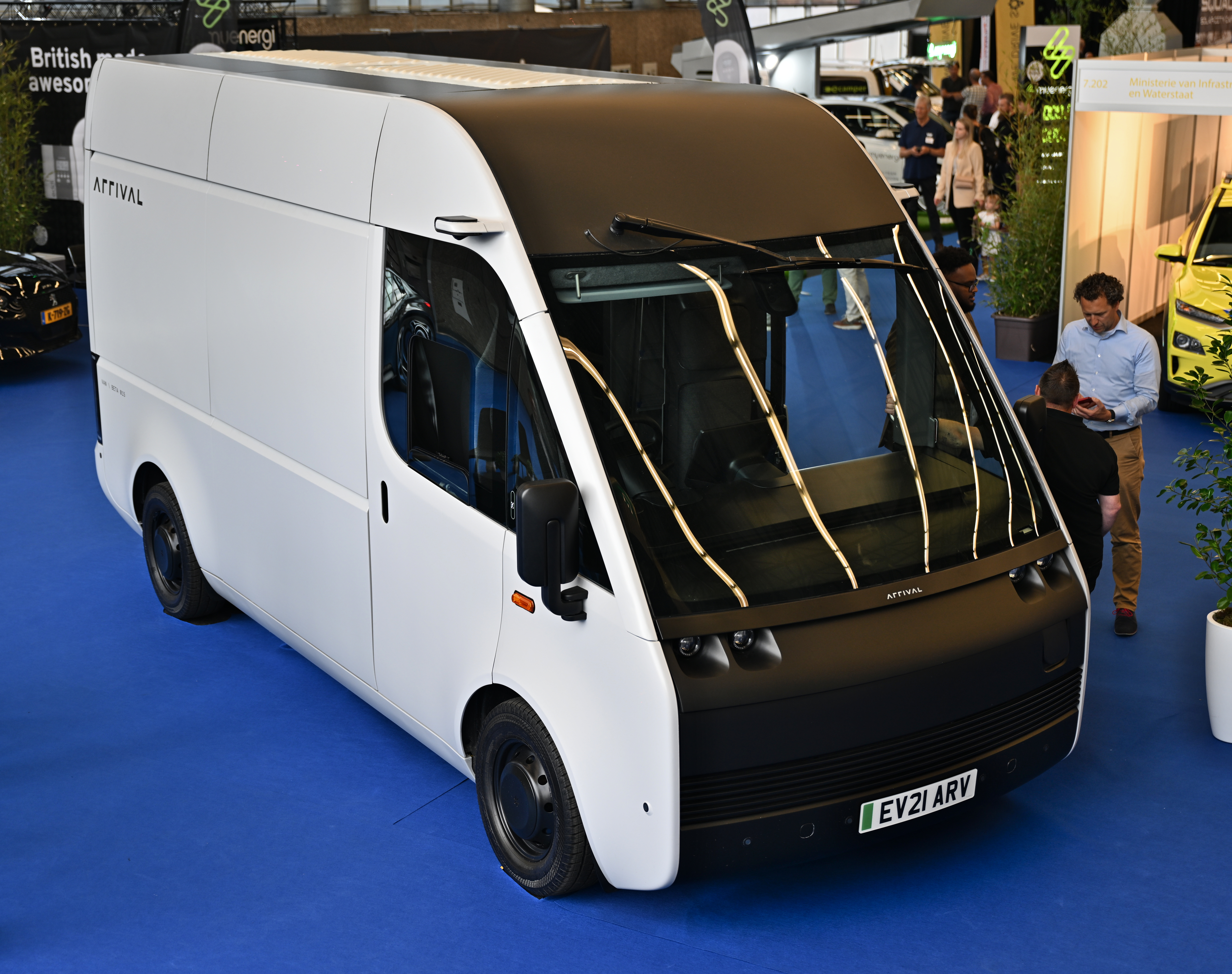
Arrival Van on display at Fully Charged in 2022

The van had a 120 kW (160 hp) engine, giving a maximum speed of 120 km/h (75 mph), and a payload of up to 1,975 kg (4,354 lb). Depending on the battery option specified, the van had a range of from 180 km (110 mi) to 340 km (210 mi) on a single charge. U.S.-based United Parcel Service (UPS) had placed an order for 10,000 delivery vans from Arrival, with the option for an additional 10,000.

=== Bus ===
In June 2020, Arrival announced that the Arrival Bus was undergoing beta prototype testing. The company unveiled its prototype in November 2021, and said that production would commence at its South Carolina plant in the second quarter of 2022.

=== Car ===
Arrival had developed a car for the purpose of ride hailing. It had done so in partnership with Uber and in close consultation with Uber drivers. Arrival had also entered a partnership with Breathe, which would have served as the third-party distributor of the Arrival car.

== History ==
The company was founded in 2015 by Russian businessman and telecom billionaire Denis Sverdlov, former deputy minister of Mass Communications to the Kremlin. He previously served as general director of Russian mobile service provider Yota Group.

A global company headquartered in Kensington, London and Charlotte, North Carolina, US, Arrival had an R&D facility in Banbury and offices in North America, Germany, Israel, Russia and the Netherlands. Following its public listing on Nasdaq in 2021, Sverdlov was the firm's majority owner for 76% of its shares.

In August 2017, Royal Mail announced an agreement with Arrival to trial nine vehicles in the ranges of 3.5, 6 and 7 tonnes GVW. In May 2019, UPS announced a deal with Arrival to trial 35 vehicles across London and Paris as part of a wider strategy to electrify their massive fleet of delivery vehicles.

In October 2019, BlackBerry announced that it would power Arrival's Generation 2.0 intelligent electric vehicles. As part of the deal, it would license its BlackBerry QNX technology to Arrival, including its QNX SDP 7.0 real-time operating system, to serve as the secure foundation for ADAS features within the company's vehicle platform.

In December 2019, Cubic Telecom, a connectivity management software provider, partnered with Arrival to deliver intelligent connectivity software to their electric vehicle fleets. Two months earlier, former General Motors VP of EV Infrastructure and Global Strategy Mike Ableson joined the company as its CEO of Automotive North America.

In January 2020, it announced that Hyundai and Kia Motors had invested €100 million in the firm, beginning a partnership between the automakers to accelerate the adoption of commercial electric vehicles globally. Following the investment, Arrival revealed that they had achieved "unicorn" status, valuing the start-up at €3 billion. Arrival plans to use 10,000 m^{2} (110,000 sq ft) "microfactories" to build their electric vehicles, having developed a "skateboard" platform containing a drive train and batteries.

On January 29, Arrival announced that UPS had invested in the company and placed an order for 10,000 Generation 2 electric vehicles to be rolled out across the UK, Europe and North America before 2024 as part of their transition towards a zero-emissions fleet. The deal was reported to be worth $400m along with an equity stake in the company of an undisclosed size. The purpose-built electric vehicles have been co-developed by Arrival and UPS in order to meet UPS's exact specifications, including the latest advanced control and safety features.

In March, it acquired a new factory in Bicester, intending to make it operational and begin production within a two-year period. In June, it announced a new passenger bus, designed for coronoavirus-era social distancing and which would be priced the same as a diesel bus; lower running costs would make operating it cheaper in the long term.

On March 25, 2021, three months after establishing its North American headquarters in the Charlotte, North Carolina metro area, it went public on the Nasdaq under the symbol ARVL, reaching a value of $250 million in January 2023 after being worth $15 billion at its peak.

Having its first U.S. office in the South End neighborhood, Arrival's first American microfactory in the neighboring suburb of Rock Hill was to produce buses. The company was investing $41.2 million for its second microfactory in West Charlotte, where it planned to produce UPS delivery vans from mid-2022, with a workforce of 250.

In late May 2021, Arrival announced that it would build electric cars for Uber ride-hailing drivers, with production expected in Q3 of 2023. In November, three months after announcing a product development R&D center in India, Arrival reported that production would begin the following year. Additionally, it was reported that it had non-binding orders or letters of intent for 64,000 vehicles.

When it announced job cuts amid the relocation of its van production from Bicester to the USA in October 2022, it was also reported its restructuring focusing on the American market by capitalising on the incentives from Inflation Reduction Act of 2022. In January 2023, when it appointed Igor Torgov as its CEO, Arrival laid off half of its UK employees (800) and decided to focus on the US and take advantage of green energy subsidies.

In 2023, Arrival announced a second merger with special purpose acquisition company Kensington Capital Acquisition Corp V for $283 million; the deal was later cancelled due to concerns about Arrival's production delays. It also lost out on a $25 million investment by US hedge fund Antara Capital; the agreement to purchase an additional $25m in equity was terminated before the deadline of 30 June 2023.

Arrival was delisted from Nasdaq in January 2024 and shortly afterward began insolvency proceedings.

== Leadership ==
- Chairman: Denis Sverdlov (November 2022 - March 2024)
- Chief Executive: Igor Torgov (January 2023 - March 2024)

=== List of former chairmen ===
The position of chairman was first formed in November 2020, when Arrival publicly listed on the NASDAQ.

- Peter Cuneo (2020–2022)

=== List of former chief executives ===
- Denis Sverdlov (2016–2022)
- Peter Cuneo (2022–2023); interim CEO
