= Arrival Van =

Electric cargo van manufactured by Arrival

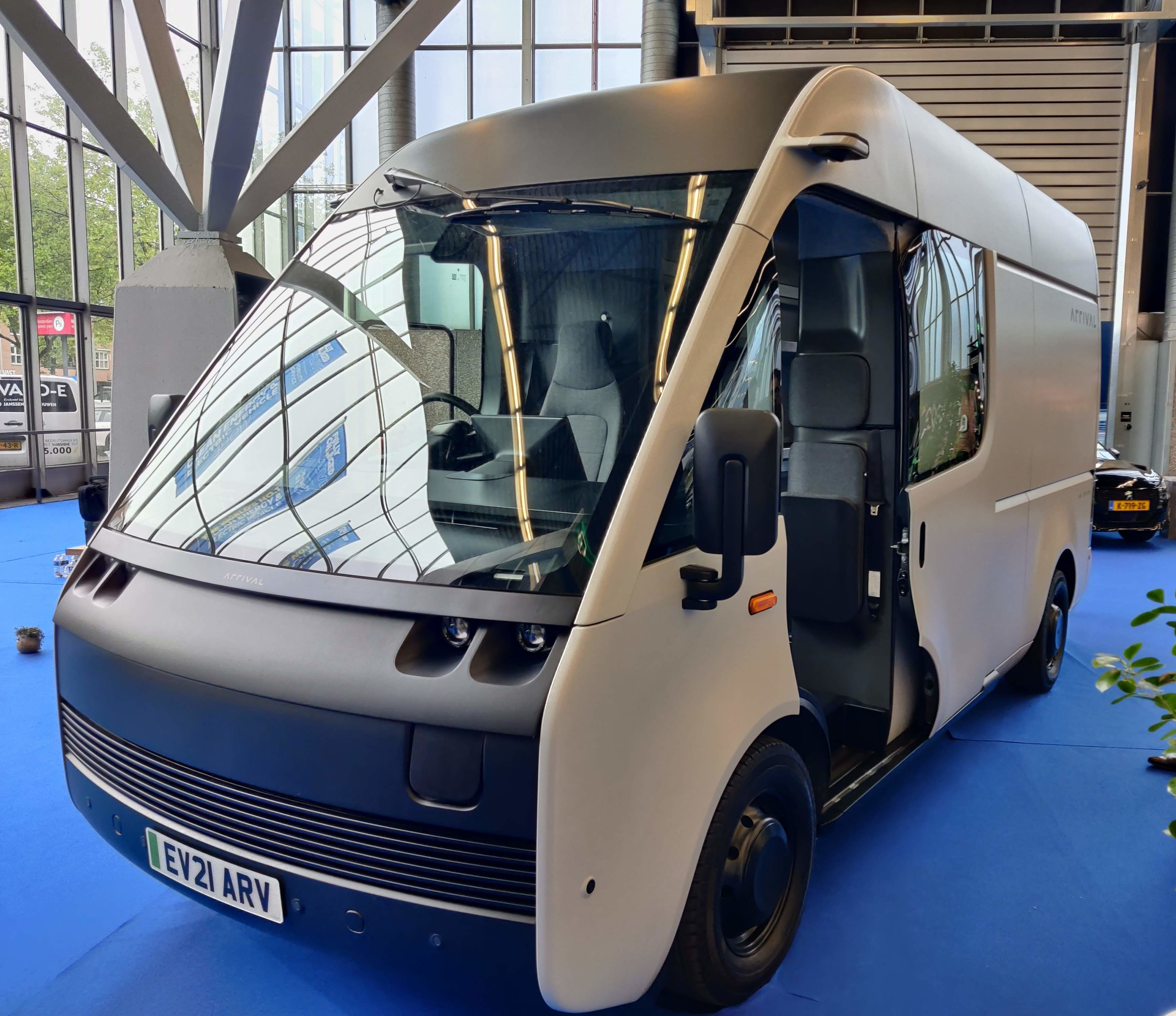
- Arrival Van on display at Fully Charged in 2022

Overview
- Manufacturer: Arrival
- Production: 2021 (limited); 2022 (tentative)
- Assembly: Bicester, England (U.K.); Charlotte, North Carolina (U.S.)

Body and chassis
- Class: Light commercial vehicle (M)
- Body style: 3-door cargo van
- Layout: FF Layout

Dimensions
- Wheelbase: 3,550 mm (139.8 in) (L3)
- Length: 5,100 mm (200.8 in) (L1); 5,790 mm (228.0 in) (L3); 6,500 mm (255.9 in) (L4)
- Width: 2,340 mm (92.1 in)
- Height: 2,730 mm (107.5 in) (H3)
- Curb weight: 2,275 kg (5,015.5 lb)

The Arrival Van is a battery electric cargo van designed by Arrival. It was scheduled to enter the market in 2022, but was delayed, with Arrival declaring bankruptcy in 2024.

== History ==
The pre-production prototype of a fully electric van, which was also the first vehicle developed by the British company Arrival, was presented in August 2017. Nine prototypes were built for the Royal Mail as a trial in 2017, in three weights of 3.5, 6, and 7.5 t (7,700, 13,200, and 16,500 lb); they were used to distribute mail from the central London depot. Arrival developed the Van in partnership with UPS, who had plans to deploy 35 prototypes in London and Paris in 2017 as a trial.

In 2020, UPS took a minority stake in Arrival and ordered 10,000 Vans with advanced driver-assistance systems that would be used in the United States and Europe. The custom UPS Vans were scheduled to be delivered by 2024, and the contract included an option for an additional 10,000 Vans. Including the option, Arrival expected US$1.2 billion in revenue from the UPS contract. The Vans would have an estimated range of 150 mi (240 km) and were planned to be assembled in multiple 'microfactories' instead of a single production facility.

Arrival achieved European type certification and whole vehicle type approval for the Van in June 2022. In August 2022, Arrival slashed its forecast for vehicles delivered in 2022 from 400–600 to 20 and announced it would reorganize to cut costs, possibly including layoffs. As part of the reorganization, the start of production at Charlotte slipped to 2023.

The first Arrival Van was produced at Bicester in late September 2022; however, serial production did not commence, as the entire production run at Bicester for 2022 was set aside for testing, validation, and quality control. Arrival announced in October 2022 the Bicester Van plant would be wound down and the company would shift its focus to Van production in Charlotte, citing the size of the potential market in North America, the Inflation Reduction Act, and its tax credits as influencing its decision. Limited production of Vans was intended to continue in Bicester, but that microfactory would not be scaled up to mass production; Arrival also paused development and production of its Bus and Car. Arrival announced in November that it does not expect to deliver any Vans to customers before 2024.

In 2023, Arrival announced company-wide layoffs, reducing its staff by 25% as it was seeking to reduce its expenses. In January 2024, Sky News reported that Arrival was negotiating with Ernst & Young for that company to act as an administrator if it could not secure rescue funding. By February, Arrival had declared bankruptcy without having sold any vehicles. During the liquidation sale, some of its assets were sold to Canoo, including "advanced manufacturing equipment".

=== Assembly ===
The Arrival microfactory concept uses multifunctional robots to reduce the number of human workers and machines; the cost of a new microfactory was estimated at US$50 million, approximately 5% the cost of a conventional automobile assembly line. The radical reduction in capital costs was expected to allow the company "to build vehicles profitably at really any volume", according to Avinash Rugoobur, Arrival's president. Arrival had an annual production volume target of 10,000 vehicles per microfactory, providing a gross margin of $100 million for each plant, including operating expenses.

The plant in Bicester, England was chosen as the lead Van microfactory and Arrival completed robotic tool installation there by May 2022; the start of Van production was scheduled for Autumn 2022. United States production also was scheduled to begin in the fourth quarter of 2022 at the second Arrival Van microfactory in Charlotte, North Carolina; the Charlotte microfactory was intended to fill the UPS order of up to 10,000 Vans. Tools for the Charlotte microfactory were scheduled to be installed in late summer 2022. Additional planned microfactories were planned to be built in Rock Hill, South Carolina and Madrid, Spain.

== Design ==
In pre-production renderings of the prototype Van, the smallest Royal Mail vehicle was a futuristic, curved single-body all-electric van with a large glazed area around the driver's seat, led by an almost-flat front with very little slope, large windshield, and angular proportions, which was praised by the press as "the cutest", prompting one writer to say the Van left them "inexplicably happy". Another reporter said the similar prototype UPS Vans "look like they've rolled straight out of Pixar's Cars series."

The final design for series production underwent extensive visual changes, making its debut in March 2021. While maintaining the single-body silhouette, the Van gained a more protruding and heaped front part of the body painted black. Access to the cabin was possible thanks to a sliding door, and apart from the driver's seat, there was also an additional fold-out jump seat for an occasional passenger.

A Large Van was added to the lineup around this time, with the expected cargo capacity doubled from 2,000 to 4,000 kg (4,400 to 8,800 lb).

=== Construction ===
The production Arrival Van uses an aluminum frame with a composite body that uses a proprietary blend of plastic and fiberglass in lieu of steel and structural adhesives instead of welds. Because the body panels are composite, they are dyed during production, eliminating the need for a separate paint shop following assembly.

The Van has a modular design; one of the nine modules is the high-voltage traction battery, offered in a range of capacities.

Compared to key competitors, the Arrival Van is expected to offer a turning circle of 12.9 m (42 ft) and a lower step-in height of 450 mm (18 in).

=== Powertrain ===
The Arrival Van is powered by a traction motor with 120 kW (160 hp) output driving the front wheels, which gives it a top speed of 120 km/h (75 mph).

Arrival offers a choice of four battery capacities, with corresponding differences in range. The batteries use a lithium ion chemistry & the cells are supplied by LG Chem.

Arrival van battery capacities & range
Capacity (kWh)	Max Range (Note: Using the Worldwide Harmonised Light Vehicles Test Procedure (WLTP) cycle)	Curb weight	Max payload (Note: Maximum gross vehicle weight rating is 4,250 kg (9,370 lb) for all models; payload is GVWR less curb weight)
67	112 mi (180 km)	2,275 kg (5,016 lb)	1,975 kg (4,354 lb)
89	149 mi (240 km)	2,395 kg (5,280 lb)	1,855 kg (4,090 lb)
111	180 mi (290 km)	2,515 kg (5,545 lb)	1,735 kg (3,825 lb)
139	211 mi (340 km)	2,635 kg (5,809 lb)	1,615 kg (3,560 lb)

Notes

Maximum recharging rate is 120 kW (DC) or 11 kW (AC).

=== Cargo ===
The maximum payload of the Arrival Van is 1,975 kg (4,354 lb) with the smallest battery. The Van has a fixed GVWR of 4,250 kg (9,370 lb); as the unladen curb weight varies with the battery selected, the maximum payload also changes.

Arrival planned to market the Van with a combination of three different roof heights (H1, H2, and H3) and five different vehicle lengths (L1, L2, L3, L4, and L5). The H3L4 Van would have been the first variant put into production. Preliminary specifications released in March 2021 indicated the L5 length option had been dropped.

Arrival van cargo volume
Lengths Heights		L1	L2	L3	L4
Lengths Heights		5.10 m (16.7 ft)	?	5.79 m (19.0 ft)	6.50 m (21.3 ft)
H1	?	?	?	—N/a	—N/a
H2	?	?	?	?	—N/a
H3	2.73 m (8 ft 11 in)	—N/a	?	14.0 m^{3} (490 cu ft)	?

=== Driver assistance and autonomy ===
The Arrival Van is equipped with advanced driver-assistance systems, including lane keeping assistance, blind spot monitoring, automatic emergency braking, and traffic sign recognition.

Arrival also were developing autonomous vehicle driving systems. A Van prototype was fitted with a Level 4 automated driving system as part of Arrival's Robopilot project; the Robopilot Van successfully completed a route within a closed package depot in August 2021. Arrival's approach to autonomy relied primarily on machine vision.

== Gallery ==
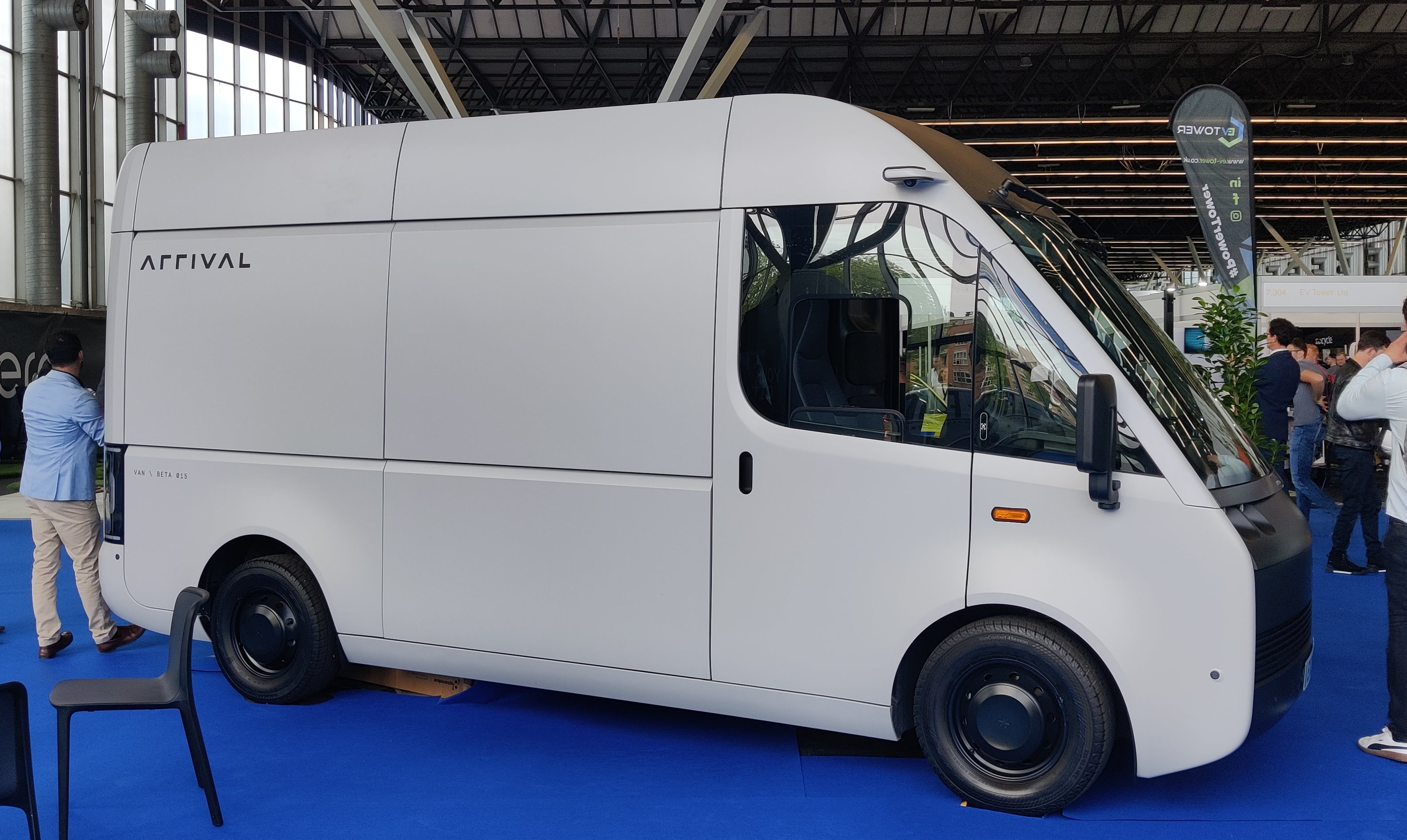
Left side

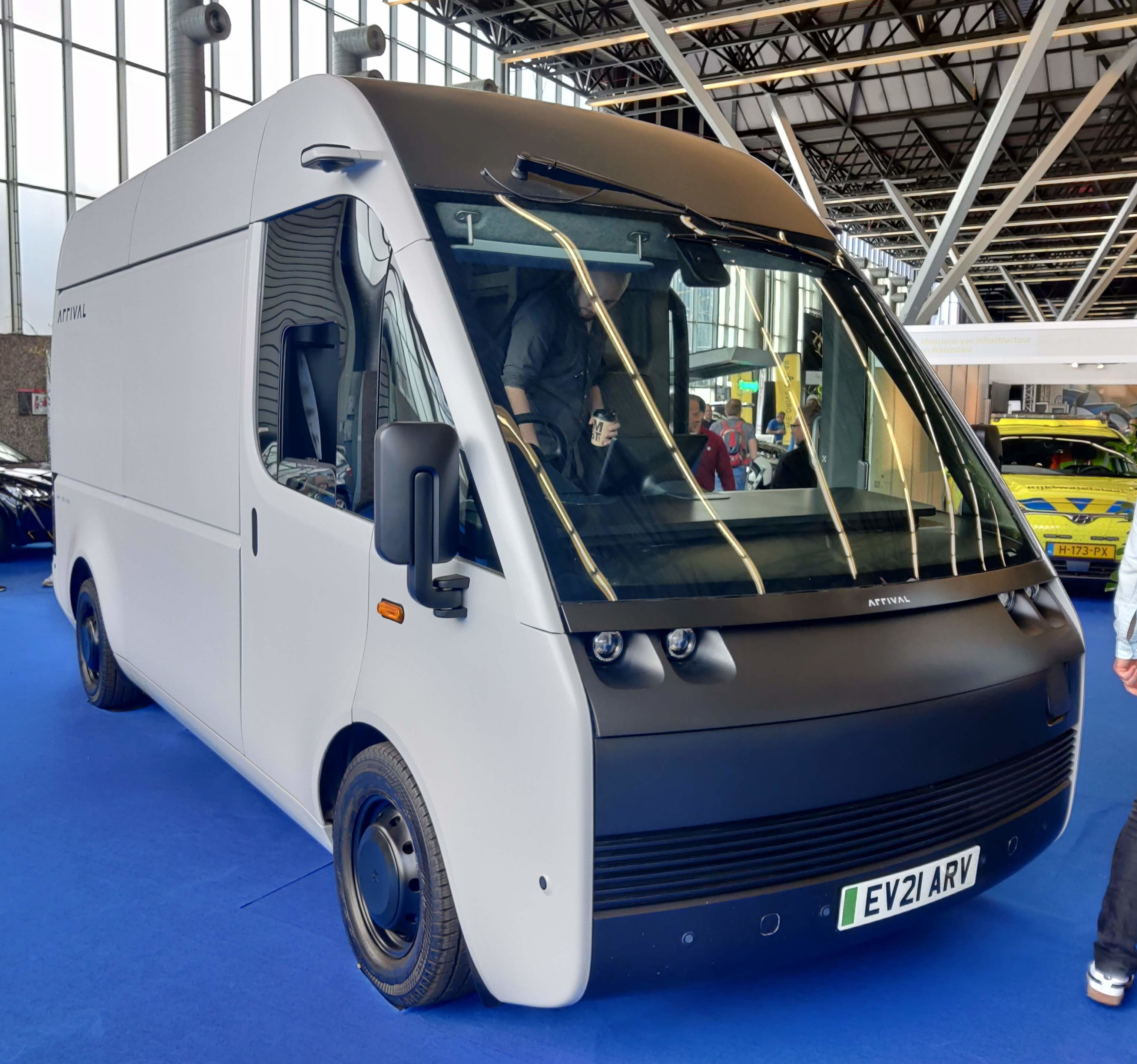
Front side

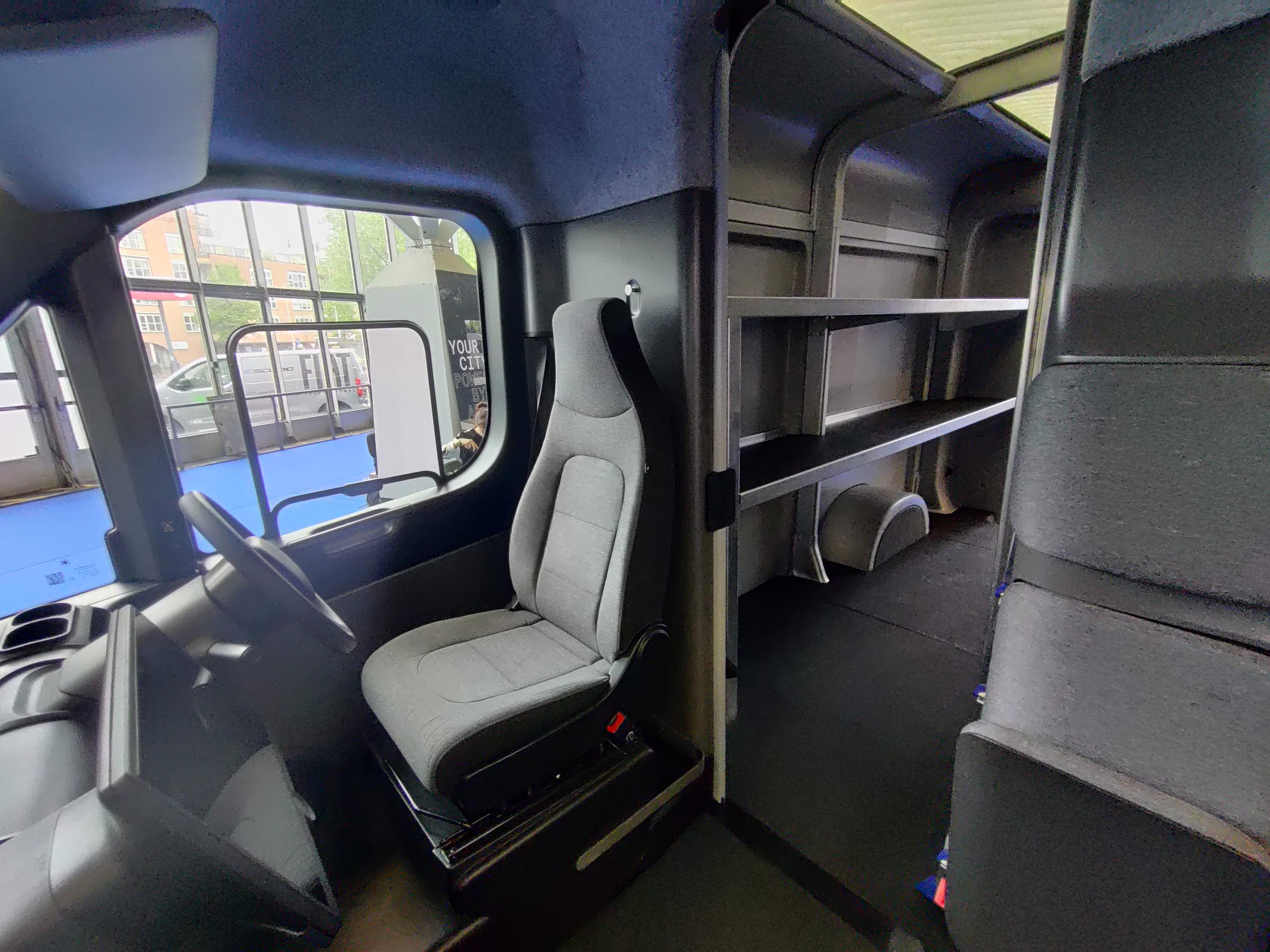
Interior

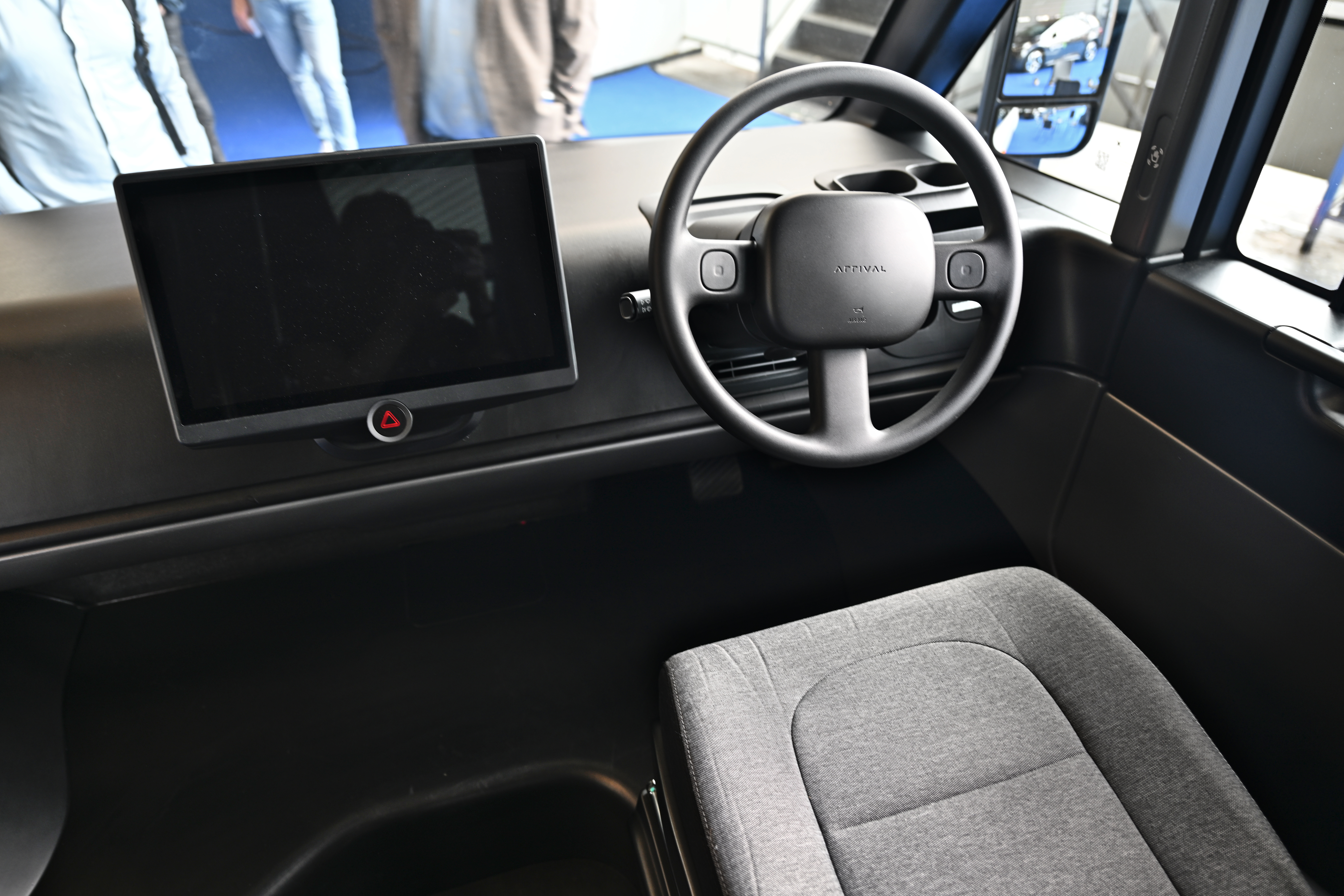
Driver view

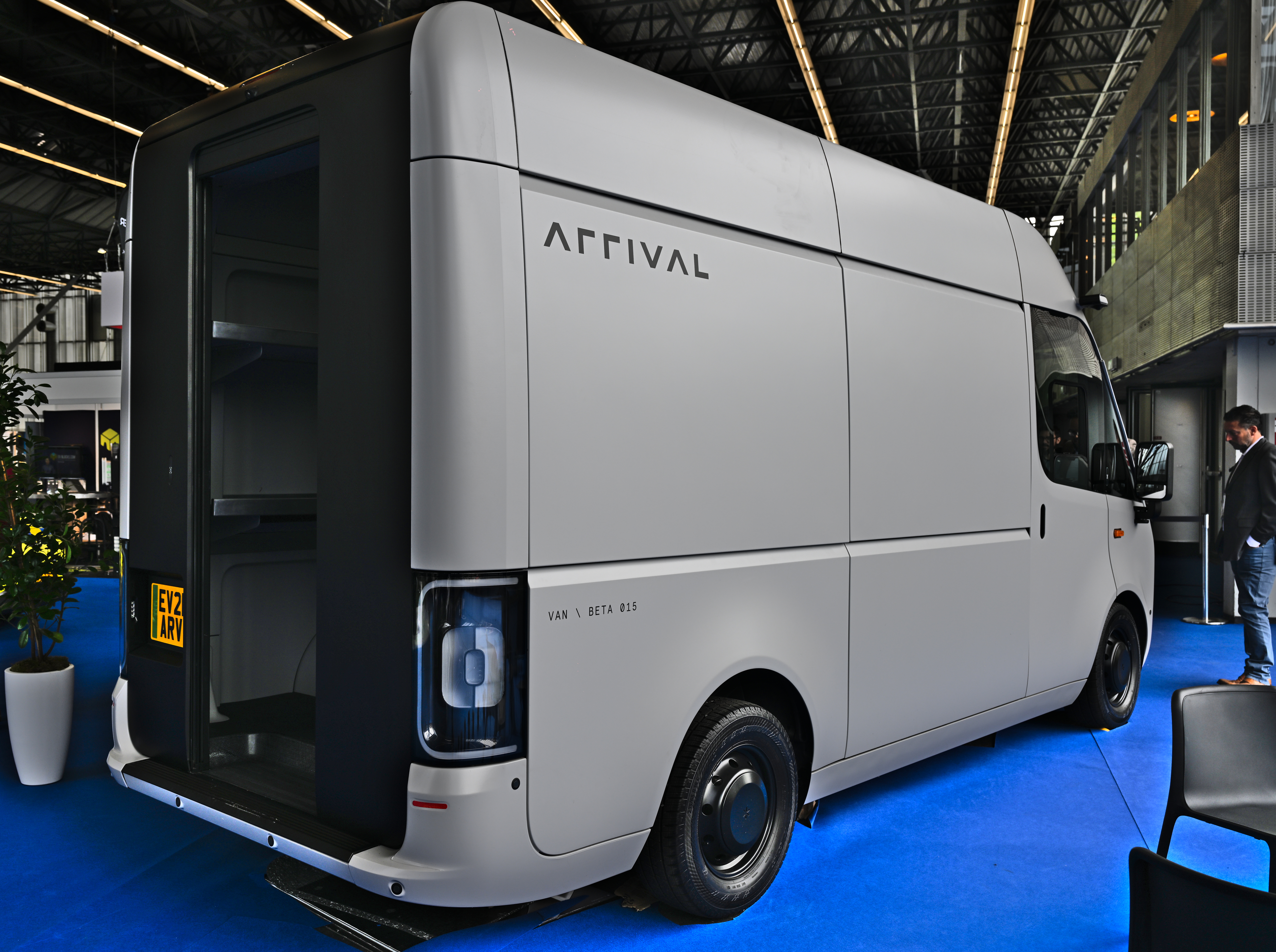
Rear view
