= Peter Cuneo =

American businessman

- Born: Frank Peter Cuneo; Alameda, California, United States
- Education: Harvard Business School (MBA); Alfred University (BS)
- Title: Managing Principal
- Spouse: Maris Cuneo
- Children: 2

Frank Peter Cuneo is an American businessperson who has been CEO and vice chairman of Marvel Entertainment, president and CEO of Remington Products, managing principal of Cuneo & Company, a private investment and management company and president of Black & Decker security hardware group. Business Insider named Cuneo as one of the "Ten Greatest Turnaround CEOs".

== Early life ==
Peter Cuneo was born at Naval Air Station Alameda, in Alameda, California where his father was a Navy officer. Cuneo spent most of his childhood in Queens, New York City. His father was a Lieutenant in the New York City Fire Department and his mother was an Emergency medical technician. Cuneo attended Flushing High School.

== Education ==
Cuneo earned a bachelor's degree in Ceramic Engineering from Alfred University and an MBA from the Harvard Business School.

== Career ==
After a year working as a quality control engineer for Owens-Corning Fiberglas Corporation, Cuneo entered the United States Navy – graduating with honors from Officer Candidate School in Newport, Rhode Island. He served on the USS Joseph Strauss, a guided missile destroyer, as Damage Control Officer and as Communications Officer. The Strauss participated in several war cruises during the Vietnam War and Cuneo was decorated for service in that conflict.

Early in his career, Cuneo spent over a decade in various roles with Bristol Myers Squibb, including as President of Bristol Myers in Canada. His tenure as President of Clairol's personal care group marked his first successful turnaround. Cuneo later spent several years as President of Black and Decker security hardware group.

In the early 1990s, strapped with debt and a declining business, Remington Products Company was near bankruptcy. Vulture investor Isaac Perlmutter purchased a controlling interest in the company from former New England Patriots owner Victor Kiam. Cuneo was named President and Chief Executive Officer of Remington. In less than four years, he executed a successful turnaround of the business and facilitated Remington’s sale to Vestar Capital Partners.

In 1999, Cuneo was recruited to turnaround Marvel Entertainment as Chief Executive Officer. Having recently emerged from bankruptcy, Marvel was burdened by high yield debt and had only $3 million in the bank, barely enough to cover its cash needs. The company’s stock fell as low as 96 cents per share. Within a few years, Marvel had become a household name launching film franchises based on Spider-Man, X-Men, Hulk, Fantastic Four and others. Record-breaking profits at the box office led to significant growth in toys, video games, merchandise and other consumer products as well as market share leadership in comics. Cuneo later became Vice Chairman of Marvel. The company made the transformative move of raising $525 million in funding to launch Marvel Studios. Cuneo left Marvel with the company's sale to Disney at the end of 2009. Marvel’s stock price had risen from the low of $0.96 to over $50 per share. In December, 2009, The Walt Disney Company purchased Marvel for over $4 billion.

After leaving Marvel, Peter formed a private investment company, Cuneo & Company, with his son, Gavin. In 2011, Cuneo & Co capitalized Valiant Entertainment for relaunch. Peter Cuneo became Valiant's Chairman with Gavin Cuneo serving as Chief Operating Officer and on the board. Valiant was relaunched under new leadership to become “Marvel 2.0”. With its revival, Valiant soon became the third largest superhero entertainment company after Marvel and DC Comics. Valiant struck a five-movie partnership with Sony Pictures. Numerous film and TV projects were announced including Bloodshot (film). Cuneo & Company exited Valiant through the sale to DMG Entertainment in 2018.

In 2015, Cuneo was named Interim CEO of publicly traded Iconix Brand Group. Iconix is a brand management company and owner of over 20 brands such as Rocawear, Umbro, Peanuts, Mossimo, Ed Hardy, Ecko and Candies. From 2015 to 2021, Cuneo transitioned from Interim CEO to Executive Chairman to non-Executive Chairman. In 2021, Iconix was acquired by Lancer Capital, an affiliate of the Glazer Family.

In 2017, Cuneo was named Chairman of VR / digital twin startup BeyondView, formerly known as Uncorporeal Systems. He has sat on the boards of numerous public and private companies.

In 2019, Cuneo became Chairman of CIIG Merger Corp, a Special-purpose acquisition company. CIIG was founded by Peter Cuneo, Gavin Cuneo and Michael Minnick. CIIG IPO’d on Nasdaq on December 17, 2019. On November 18, 2020 CIIG announced a business combination with electric vehicle developer Arrival including a $400 million in private investment in public equity, or PIPE, from investors that included Fidelity, Wellington, BNP Paribas and BlackRock. Cuneo became Non-Executive Chairman of Arrival.

In 2021, Cuneo became Chairman of CIIG Capital Partners II Inc., a Special-purpose acquisition company. CIIG closed an upsized $287,500,000 Initial Public Offering on Nasdaq on September 17, 2021.

== Nonprofit work ==
Cuneo has been a member of the Alfred University Board of Trustees since the 1990s. He served as its Chairman for number of years. Cuneo helped found the Maris Cuneo Equestrian Park at Alfred University with his wife Maris Cuneo.

Cuneo sits on the Board of the National Archives Foundation in Washington, D.C. and on the Board of the National Policing Institute.
