= Yota =

Russian mobile virtual network operator

WiMAX Holdings Ltd.
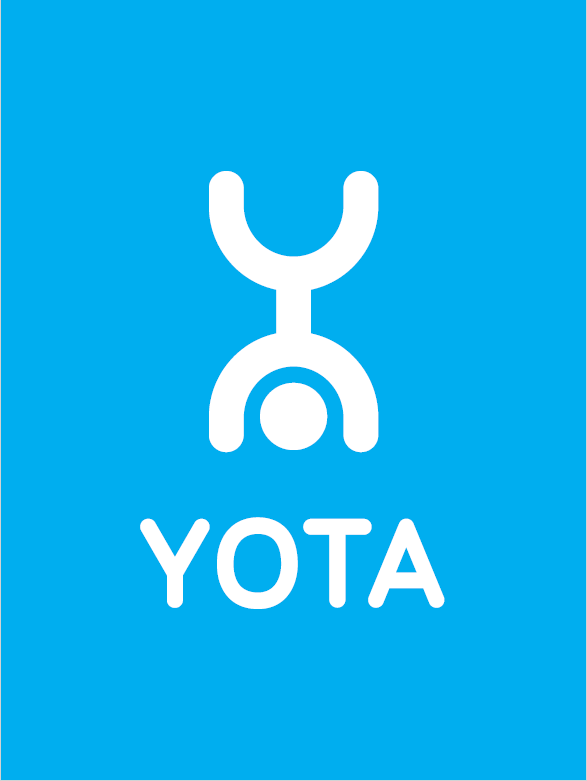
- Type: Limited company
- Industry: Telecommunications, consumer electronics, digital distribution
- Founded: 2007 (SLL Scartel); 2008 (ИОО Yota Бел)
- Defunct: 2019
- Fate: Bankruptcy
- Area served: Moscow, Saint Petersburg, Astrahan, Kazan, Khabarovsk, Kovrov, Kostroma, Krasnodar, Krasnoyarsk, Murom, Naberezhnye Chelny, Novosibirsk, Obninsk, Orenburg, Samara, Sochi, Tomsk, Tula, Ufa, Vladivostok, Vladimir, Yoshkar-Ola
- Key people: Igor Torgov (CEO)
- Services: Mobile internet, cell phone operator
- Revenue: $486.78 million (2017)
- Net income: $116.55 million (2017)
- Owner: MegaFon
- Subsidiaries: SLL Scartel (Синамакс and Макмис owned by Scartel); Scartel Starlab; More; ИОО Yota Бел (100%); Yota de Nicaragua (75%)

Yota (Russian: Йота) was a Russian mobile virtual network operator.

Formerly, Yota was a Russian mobile phone brand and mobile broadband manufacturer. Yota was a trademark of Skartel LLC. Yota later suffered bankruptcy due to a lawsuit.

Garsdale Services Investment Ltd. owned 100% of Yota's shares and 50% of MegaFon's shares. In turn, Garsdale is controlled by AF-Telecom (82%), Telconet Capital (13.5%), and the Russian Technologies State Corporation (4.5%).

== History ==
In 2006, the co-owners of the St. Petersburg company Korus, Russian businessman Denis Sverdlov and Bulgarian businessman Sergey Adonev, established Skartel, a provider of wireless broadbands WiMAX. In 2008, Skartel became the first company in Russia to deploy WiMAX standard networks in Moscow and Saint Petersburg in a range of 2.5–2.7 GHz. In 2010, Yota announced its plans to launch a subscription-based LTE network with a rate of 20–30 Mbit/s. The first test of the new standard network took place in Kazan on 30 August 2010, installing about 150 base stations. The investments into the LTE network deployment constituted $20 million. The fourth generation LTE network, which was tested by the Yota provider in Kazan, was switched off the next day.

On May 9, 2012, Yota's WiMAX was replaced by its LTE network. In September 2012, 4G networks were launched in such cities as Novosibirsk, Krasnodar, Sochi, Samara, Vladivostok, Ufa, Kazan, Moscow, and Saint Petersburg.

In April 2019, Yota filed for bankruptcy. The bankruptcy stemmed from a lawsuit filed against the company by its contracted manufacturer, Hi-P Singapore.

== Long-term evolution ==
Officially, Novosibirsk was the first Russian city where the LTE network was deployed, commercially launched on 22 December 2011. Then, it was adopted in Krasnodar (29 April 2012), Moscow (10 May 2012), and Sochi (11 May 2012). Samara was connected to LTE on 23 May 2013. And later on, Ufa and Saint Petersburg have also joined this service.

LTE networks work within a range of 2.5–2.7 GHz, which is one of the ranges accepted as standard by the International Telecommunication Union. In Russia, these frequencies have also been selected by the Ministry of Communications and Mass Communications of the Russian Federation for the 4th generation networks.

AF-Telecom (Megafon) and Skartel concluded the contract on joint development of networks for the fourth generation LTE mobile communications in Russia based on a business model of the mobile virtual network operator (MVNO). On 10 July 2012, Megafon and Skartel shareholders declared the end of the transaction.

== Yota Devices ==
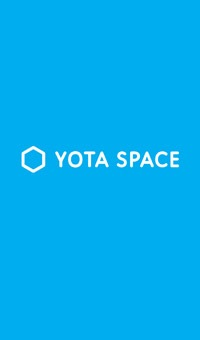
Yota Space Festival logo

In July 2011, Yota presented a new family of devices compatible with Yota's 4G WiMAX network. The devices had names like "Yota One" and "Yota Many". Unlike previous models, they were designed by the company itself. Shaped like a "plain box", Yota Many is a portable Wi-Fi hotspot device that is smaller than its predecessor. Yota's primary device, the Modem Yota, operates on Yota's 4G LTE network and looks like a slightly larger and thicker version of the Yota One.

On 12 December 2012, Yota Devices announced the first "YotaPhone" prototype, a double-display smartphone. It has a 4.3-inch, HD LCD on the front and an e-ink display on the back. The prototype runs version 4.2 of the Android operating system. Yota Devices released more information at the Mobile World Congress in Barcelona in February 2013.

In November 2014, President of Russia Vladimir Putin gifted General Secretary of the Chinese Communist Party Xi Jinping a YotaPhone 2.

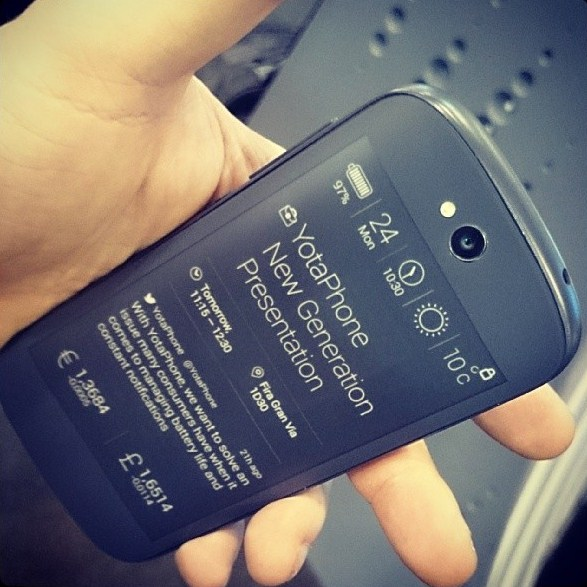
YotaPhone II

== See also ==
- HTC MAX 4G – phone with Mobile WiMAX and GSM
- Yota Space – International Digital Arts Festival
- List of deployed WiMAX networks in Russia
