= Agara, Georgia =

Agara აგარა
- Location in Georgia Agara (Shida Kartli)
- Coordinates: 42°2′10″N 43°49′30″E
- Country: Georgia
- Region: Shida Kartli
- Municipality: Kareli
- Elevation: 640 m (2,100 ft)

Population (2014)
  - Total: 3,364
- Time zone: UTC+4 (Georgian Time)

Agara (Georgian: აგარა) is a town in Kareli Municipality, Shida Kartli, Georgia. Agara has a population of 3,364 as of 2014.
