= Google Axion =

Arm-based server processors designed by Google

- Launched: October 2024; 2 years ago
- Designed by: Google
- Manufactured by: TSMC (reported)
- Fabrication process: TSMC N3 (reported)
- Platform(s): Server / Cloud

Instructions and architecture
- Instructions set: Arm
- Instructions: AArch64 (Armv9-A)
- Extensions: SVE2, AES, SHA
- Core architecture: Arm Neoverse V2 (C4A); Arm Neoverse N3 (N4A)

Cores
- Core count: Up to: Up to 72 vCPUs (C4A); Up to 64 vCPUs (N4A); Up to 96 vCPUs (C4A Metal)
- L1 cache: 128 KB per core (C4A): 64 KB instructions; 64 KB data
- L2 cache: 2 MB per core (C4A)
- L3 cache: 80 MB shared system cache (C4A)

Memory support
- Type: DDR5
- Maximum capacity: Up to 576 GB (C4A); Up to 512 GB (N4A); Up to 768 GB (C4A Metal)

Google Axion is a family of custom Arm-based server microprocessors designed by Google for its Google Cloud data centers. Announced in April 2024 at Google Cloud Next, Axion is Google's first custom general-purpose data center CPU, following earlier application-specific processors such as the Tensor Processing Unit (TPU) for machine learning and Google Tensor for mobile devices.

Built on Arm Neoverse microarchitectures, Axion was developed to compete with other hyperscaler-designed Arm server processors, including Amazon Web Services' AWS Graviton and Microsoft's Microsoft Azure Cobalt. Following an initial preview period, the first Axion-powered virtual machines (the C4A series) entered general availability in October 2024, followed by bare-metal (C4A Metal) and general-purpose scale-out (N4A) configurations in late 2025.

== History and background ==
Prior to introducing Axion, Google developed several custom application-specific integrated circuits (ASICs) for its cloud infrastructure, beginning with the Tensor Processing Unit (TPU) in 2015 and Video Coding Units (VCUs) for YouTube transcoding. For Arm-based general-purpose cloud instances, Google previously relied on third-party merchant silicon, introducing the Tau T2A instance family in 2022 powered by Ampere Computing's Altra processors.

Google officially announced the Axion processor on April 9, 2024, during its Google Cloud Next conference. Industry analysts noted that the release aligned Google with rival cloud providers Amazon Web Services (which launched its first AWS Graviton chip in 2018) and Microsoft (which announced its Arm-based Cobalt 100 CPU in late 2023) in shifting internal workloads and customer virtual machines away from third-party x86 processors.

In October 2024, the first Axion-based virtual machine series, C4A, reached general availability across several North American, European, and Asian cloud regions. In November 2025, Google expanded the Axion lineup with the introduction of N4A virtual machines for scale-out workloads and C4A Metal bare-metal instances.

== Architecture ==
The first-generation Axion processor powering the C4A series is based on the Arm Neoverse V2 core design and implements the 64-bit Armv9-A instruction set architecture. Subsequent Axion processors deployed in Google's N4A instance family utilize the Arm Neoverse N3 core. According to semiconductor research firm TrendForce, Axion is manufactured by TSMC using its 3 nm (N3) fabrication process. During the physical design of the chip, engineers utilized AlphaChip, a reinforcement learning floorplanning system developed by Google DeepMind, to lay out several of the processor's circuit blocks.

Because Armv9-A eliminates hardware support for 32-bit execution at the core level, Axion operates exclusively as a 64-bit (aarch64) processor. On the Neoverse V2-based C4A platform, each core incorporates Scalable Vector Extension 2 (SVE2) with quad 128-bit SIMD execution units, cryptographic acceleration extensions (AES and SHA), 64 KB of L1 instruction cache, 64 KB of L1 data cache, and 2 MB of private L2 cache, backed by an 80 MB shared system L3 cache and DDR5 memory.

=== Titanium offload system ===
Axion instances are paired with Google's custom Titanium system, an architecture of purpose-built microcontroller data processing units (DPUs) and tiered hardware offloads comparable to AWS Nitro. Titanium offloads hypervisor management, network processing, security operations, and block storage I/O (such as Google's Hyperdisk storage) from the main Axion CPU cores so that host compute resources remain dedicated to customer workloads.

== Cloud instance families ==
Axion processors are not sold commercially as standalone hardware; they are accessed exclusively through Google Cloud services such as Google Compute Engine, Google Kubernetes Engine, and AlloyDB.

Google Cloud instance series powered by Axion
Series	Type	Core architecture	Max vCPUs	Max memory (DDR5)	Max network bandwidth	Availability
C4A	Compute-optimized VM	Arm Neoverse V2	72	576 GB	100 Gbps	October 2024
C4A Metal	Bare-metal server	Arm Neoverse V2	96	768 GB	100 Gbps	November 2025 (Preview)
N4A	General-purpose scale-out VM	Arm Neoverse N3	64	512 GB	50 Gbps	Late 2025 / Early 2026

== Performance and reception ==
At launch, Google stated that Axion delivered up to 30% higher performance than the fastest general-purpose Arm instances then available in the cloud, and up to 50% better performance and 60% better energy efficiency than comparable x86-based virtual machines.

In independent Linux benchmarking conducted by Phoronix in October 2024, Axion-powered C4A instances demonstrated substantial generational gains over Google's prior Ampere Altra-based T2A instances and delivered competitive raw performance and higher performance-per-dollar against Intel Xeon Emerald Rapids (C4) instances across web server, compilation, and database workloads. However, Phoronix noted that for specific heavy AVX-512 workloads, Intel's x86 processors retained an advantage over Axion's quad 128-bit SVE2 implementation.

Subsequent independent testing of the lower-cost N4A instances in February 2026 against AMD EPYC Turin (N4D) and Intel Xeon (N4) instances found that Axion led in energy efficiency and cost-effectiveness across a majority of multi-threaded cloud and cryptography workloads.

== See also ==
- Tensor Processing Unit
- Google Tensor
- AWS Graviton
- Arm Neoverse
