= Graviton (disambiguation) =

A graviton is a hypothetical gauge boson of a quantum theory of gravitation.

Graviton may also refer to:

- Graviton (character), a supervillain in Marvel Comics
- Graviton City, a fictional city in the anime film Project A-ko
- AWS Graviton, a series of processors developed by Annapurna Labs for use in data centers

== See also ==
- Gravitron, an amusement ride
- Gravitonas, a Swedish rock band
