= Renée James =

American technology executive

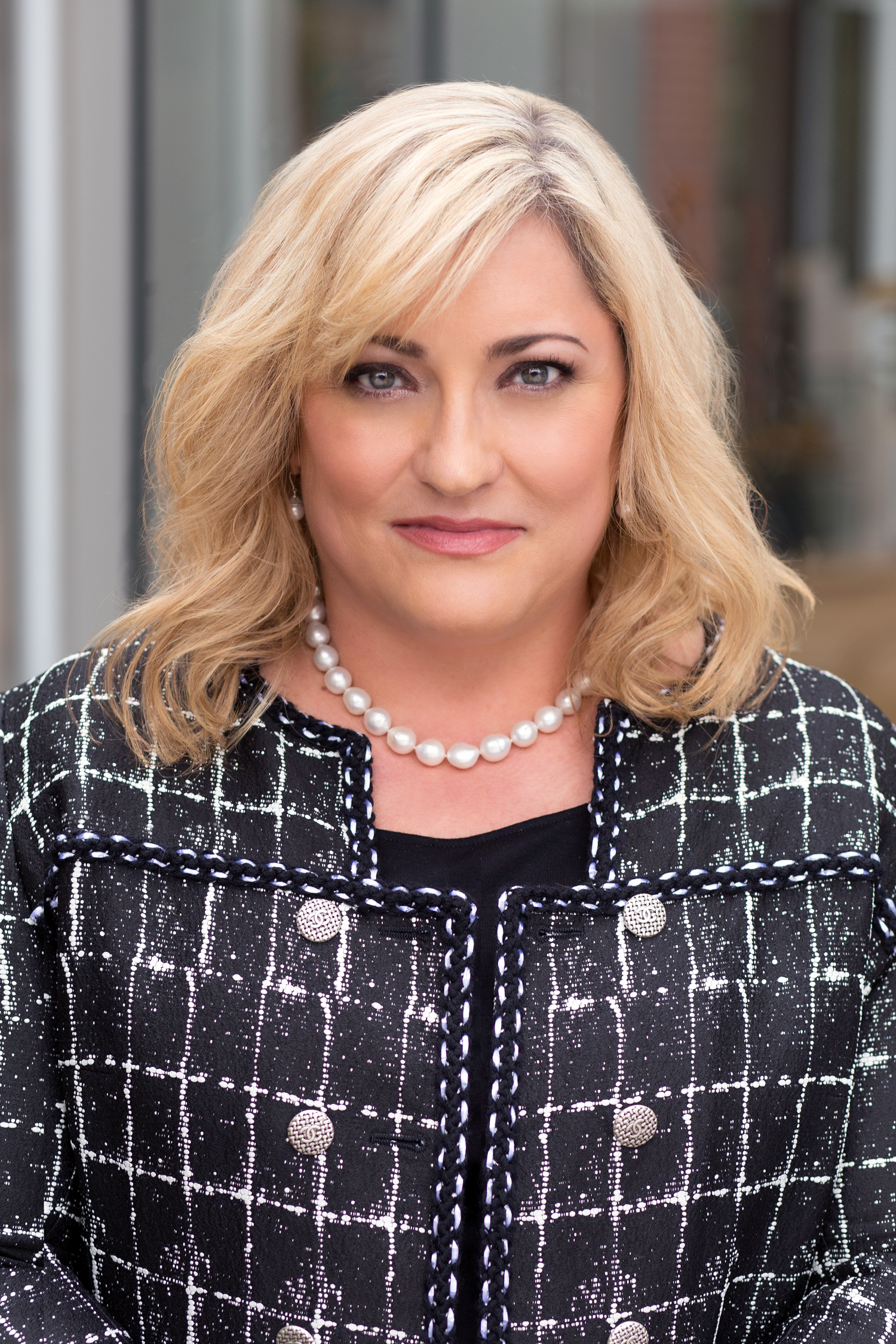
- Born: Los Angeles County, California
- Education: University of Oregon (B.A. and M.B.A)
- Occupations: Founder, Chairman and CEO at Ampere Computing; Operating Executive at The Carlyle Group

Renée J. James (born June 25, 1964) is an American technology executive, who was formerly the president of Intel. She founded Ampere Computing in October 2017, is currently its Chairman and CEO. She is also an Operating Executive with The Carlyle Group in its Media and Technology practice. James also serves on the National Security Telecommunications Advisory Committee, which she formerly chaired. The NSTAC advises the President of the United States. James also serves as an independent director of Citigroup.

== Education ==
James received a bachelor's degree in International Business in 1986 and a Master's of Business Administration in 1992, both from the University of Oregon.

== Career ==
=== Intel ===
James joined Intel in 1988 as product manager for the 386 family of motherboards and systems. In the early 90s, she was responsible for product marketing of various software programs, including digital video and personal conferencing. She was also one of the early young employees who served as technical assistant to former chief executive Andy Grove.

During her career at Intel, James spearheaded the company's strategic expansion into providing proprietary and open source software and services for applications in enterprise, security, and cloud-based computing. In her role as executive vice president and general manager of the Software and Services Group, she was responsible for Intel's global software and services strategy, revenue, profit, and product R&D. In this role, James led Intel's strategic relationships with the world's leading device and enterprise operating systems companies. She was the director and COO of Intel Online Services, Intel's datacenter services business. Early in her career James also served as chief of staff for former Intel CEO Andy Grove.

In 2010, James championed the acquisition of the software security company McAfee for $7.7 billion. In 2016, McAfee was valued at $4.2 billion after Intel sold a 51% stake to the private equity group TPG.

James has broad knowledge of the computing industry, spanning hardware, manufacturing, security, software and services, which she developed through product R&D leadership positions at Intel and as chairman of Intel's software subsidiaries. James also had been an overall leader in the development and implementation of the corporate strategy including M&A throughout her career. In her role as the president of Intel, she had responsibility for global operations and manufacturing in addition to product and P&L management.

James was appointed president of Intel Corporation on May 16, 2013.

In February 2016, James left Intel.

=== Ampere Computing ===
In 2018, James founded, and is currently chairman and CEO of Ampere Computing. The Santa Clara, California-based company, has about 1,000 employees globally. In June 2020, Ampere announced Ampere Altra and Ampere Altra Max Cloud-native processors.

In May 2022, Ampere announced sampling of Ampere One CPUs, using Ampere in house custom cores.

On March 19, 2025, Japanese company SoftBank Group announced it will acquire Ampere Computing for $6.5 billion. The deal is set to close in the second half of 2025. Ampere will remain an independent subsidiary with its headquarters in Santa Clara, California.

== Leadership ==
In 2013, President Barack Obama appointed James as a member of the National Security Telecommunications Advisory Committee (NSTAC). In January 2015, she was named to the second-highest role on the committee as Vice Chair of NSTAC.

In 2011, James began serving as a non-executive director on the Vodafone Group Plc Board of Directors and is a member of the Remuneration Committee.

James serves on the board of Sabre Corporation and is a member of their Audit and Technology Committee.

On December 16, 2015, James was elected to Oracle's board of directors.

James serves on the board of Citigroup and is a member of the Operations & Technology and Risk Management Committees.

She served 6 years as independent director on the VMware Inc. Board of Directors and was a member of the Audit Committee.

Ms. James serves as a Director of Veritas Technologies LLC.

== Recognitions ==
In 2014 James was ranked 21st on Fortune Most Powerful Women in Business list. In 2015 she ranked 45th on Forbes 100 Most Powerful Women list and 44th on Working Mother Magazine's Most Powerful Mom's list.
