= Optimus (robot) =

Humanoid robot being developed by Tesla

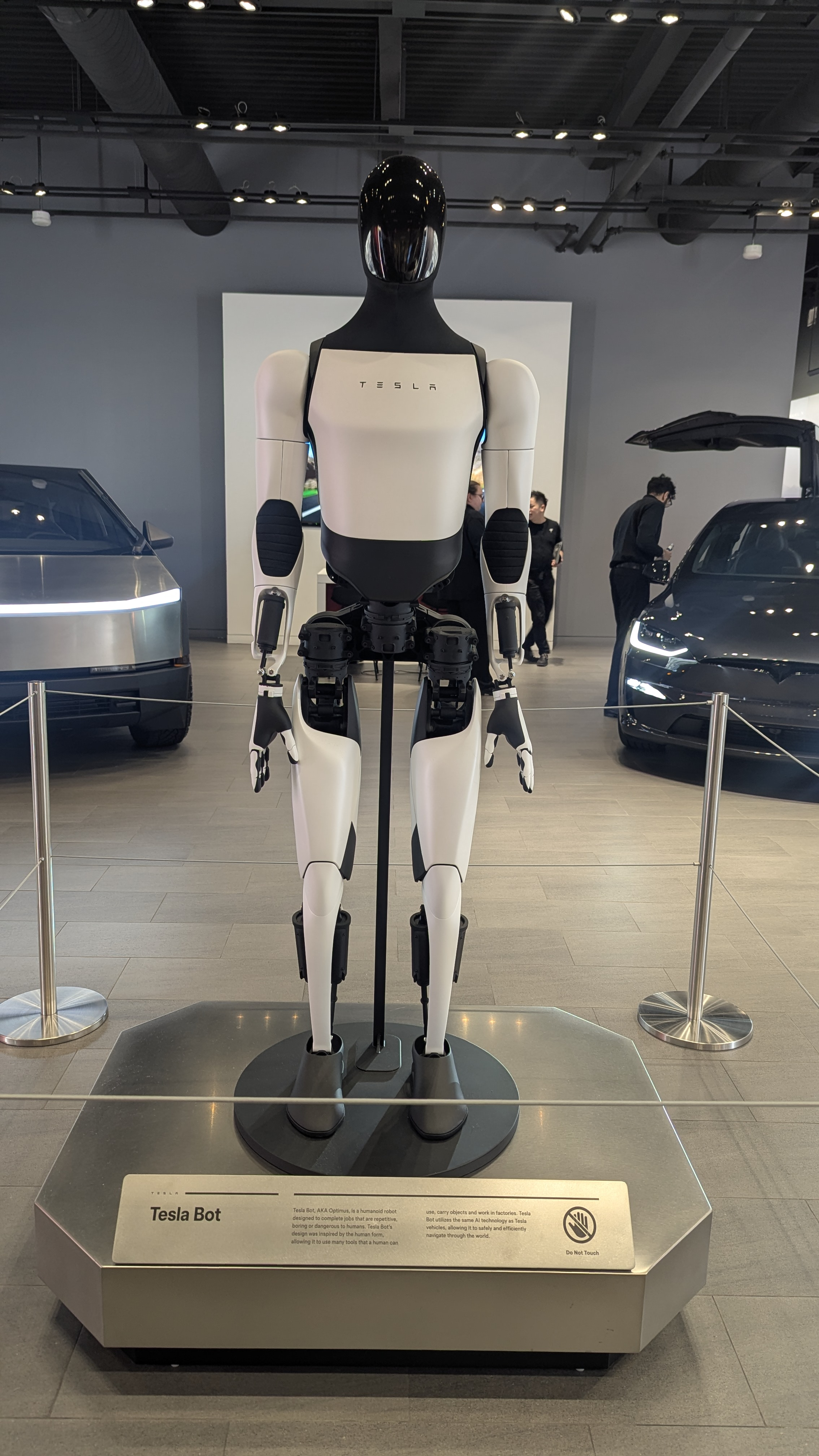
- Optimus v.2 in November 2025
- Manufacturer: Tesla, Inc.
- Country: United States
- Year of creation: 2022; 4 years ago
- Type: Humanoid
- Purpose: General-purpose

Tesla Optimus is a general-purpose robotic humanoid under development by Tesla, Inc. It was announced at the company's AI Day event on August 19, 2021, with the first prototypes shown in 2022 and a second generation in December 2023. In April 2026, Tesla said production lines for Optimus were being installed at its Fremont factory, with a third generation expected to be unveiled closer to the start of production. Musk has said Optimus will "probably" be the biggest product ever, not just Tesla's biggest product. Media and expert opinions based on corporate showcases have been mixed.

== History ==
On April 7, 2022, a display for the product was featured at the Tesla Giga Texas manufacturing facility during the Cyber Rodeo event. Musk said that he hoped to have the robot production ready by 2023 and claimed Optimus will eventually be able to do "anything that humans don’t want to do."

In June 2022, asked on Twitter whether the Optimus prototype would look similar to the display model shown at Giga Texas, Musk replied "No".

In September 2022, prototypes of Optimus were displayed at Tesla's second AI Day. One prototype walked onto the stage and waved, while a sleeker version, which could not yet stand on its own, was wheeled out on a stand and waved and lifted its legs.

In September 2023, Tesla released a video of Optimus demonstrating how it could perform new activities including sorting blocks by color, locating its limbs in space, and holding a yoga pose.

=== Generation 2 ===
In December 2023, Musk posted a video titled "Optimus" on X showing Optimus Generation 2 walking and showing new features, such as dancing and poaching an egg. The Optimus Generation 2 features a slimmer figure with improved hands and movements. In May 2024, a Twitter update shared Optimus performing various tasks at a Tesla factory.

In January 2024, viewers of a video of Optimus folding a shirt pointed out a gloved hand at the edge of the frame mirroring the robot's movements, indicating it was being controlled by teleoperation rather than acting autonomously. Some competitors began labelling their demo videos to show their robots were operating autonomously, such as Astribot adding a "no teleoperation" notice.

In June 2024, Musk claimed that Optimus would enter limited production in 2025, with plans for over 1,000 to be used in Tesla facilities and the possibility of production for other companies in 2026.

Optimus was featured at Tesla's "We, Robot" event in October 2024. While many praised the interactive demonstrations, critics again pointed out that the robots mainly used teleoperation to interact with crowds; Tesla was also criticized for not being transparent about this. Musk said that Optimus would be able to perform a wide range of everyday tasks in and outside of the home, and he estimated that the robot would eventually cost US$20,000 to $30,000.

In June 2025, Milan Kovac, the head of the Optimus program since 2022, resigned, replaced by Ashok Elluswamy, the head of Tesla autopilot teams.

In December 2025, Optimus made public appearances in Europe: on December 13 in London, UK, and December 20 in Berlin, Germany. The robot greeted visitors, handed out popcorn and posed for photos.

=== Generation 3 ===
In the Q1 earnings call on April 22, 2026, Elon Musk said that the Optimus generation 3 unveil would be pushed "closer to production", citing competitors copying earlier designs, and that production was expected to start around "late July, August". Tesla said "First-generation production lines for Optimus are being installed" in Fremont "in anticipation of volume production", designed for 1 million robots a year, and a second-generation production line in Gigafactory Texas is being designed to deliver a long-term annual production of 10 million robots starting in 2027. Musk said he expects the not-yet-released Tesla AI5 chip to go into Optimus. He also said Optimus needs enough local intelligence to "still do useful things, even if it loses connection", comparable to how Tesla cars drive without a cellular or Wi-Fi connection. Musk also said that the not-yet-released Tesla AI6 chip would be used for Optimus. For a Grok level conversation, Optimus will need a WiFi or cellular connection to Grok level AI.

== Specifications ==
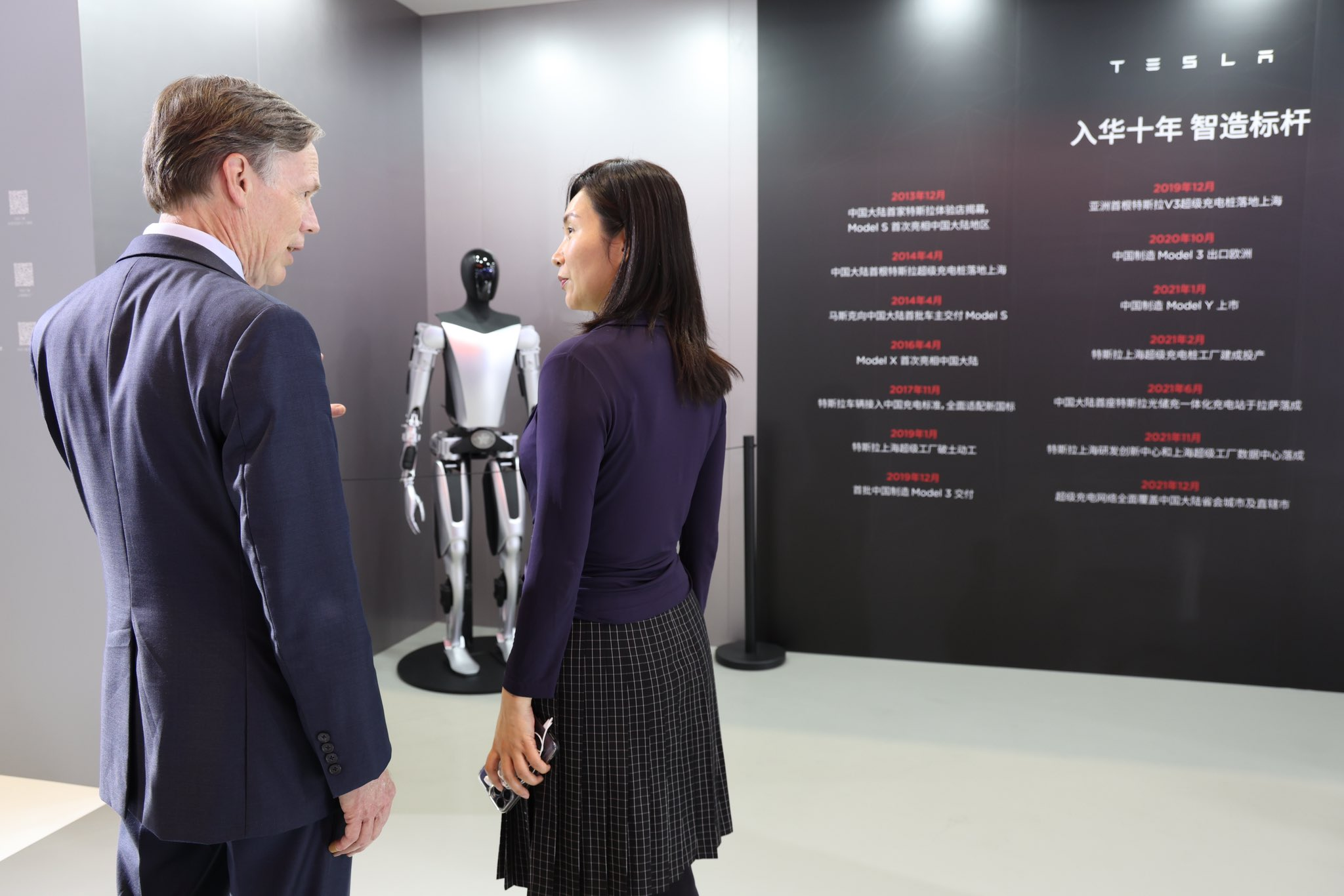
Two people in front of an Optimus display

Optimus is planned to measure 5 ft 8 in (173 cm) tall and weigh 125 lb (57 kg). According to the presentation made during the 2021 AI Day event, Optimus will be "controlled by the same AI system Tesla is developing for the self-driving system used in its cars". Musk said Optimus would perform tasks that are "boring, repetitive, and dangerous".

In 2023, the hands of the Generation 2 Optimus had 11 degrees of freedom. In November 2024, Tesla showed a new hand with 22 degrees of freedom.

== Reception ==
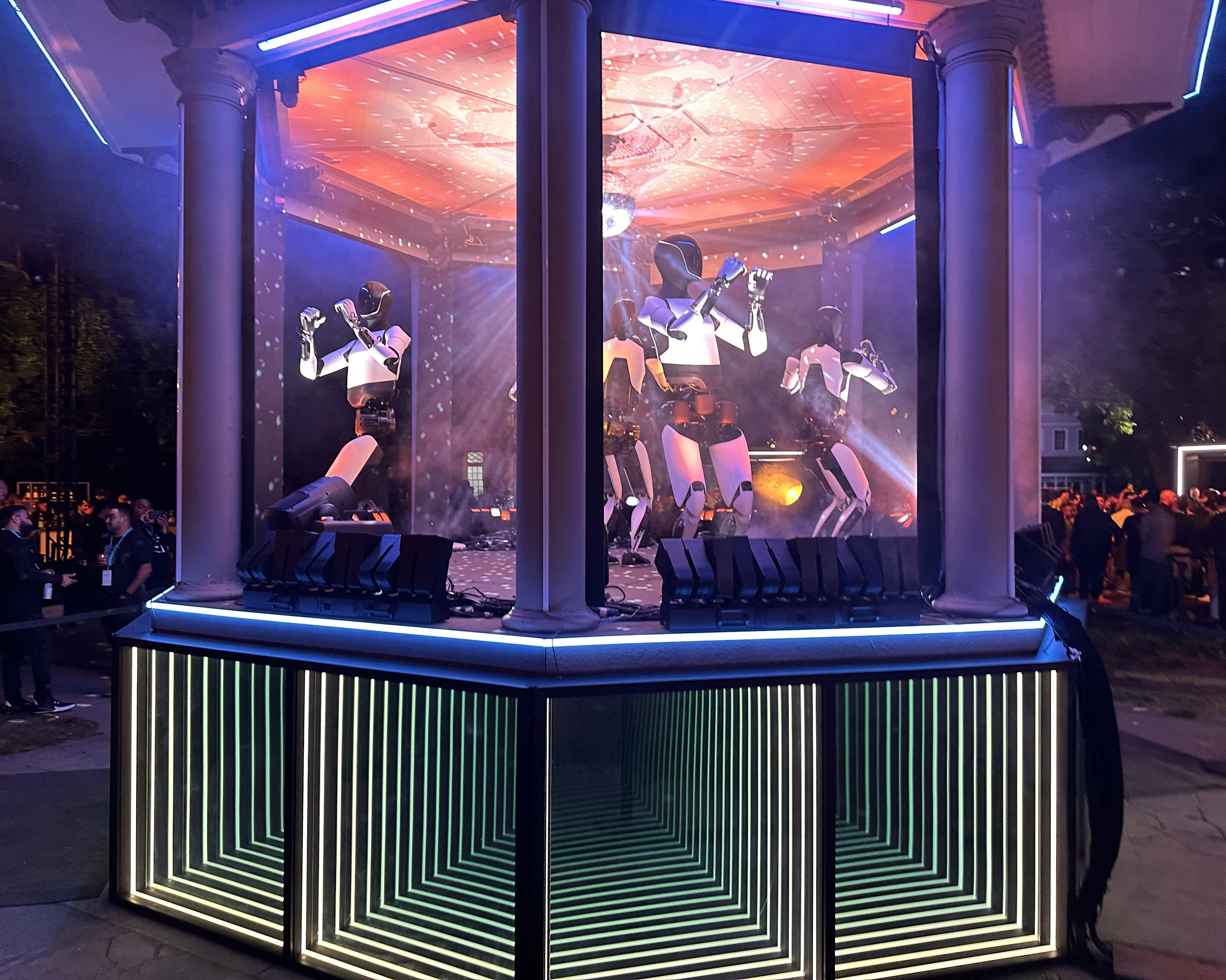
Optimus robots at Tesla Robotaxi event at Warner Brothers, October 2024

=== Initial reactions ===
Soon after the 2021 AI Day event, many publications reacted with skepticism about the proposed product. Bloomberg News claimed that such a product constituted "mission creep" and stood outside "the company’s clean-energy initiatives." The Washington Post argued that "Tesla has a history of exaggerating timelines and overpromising at its product unveilings and investor presentations." The Verge similarly noted that "Tesla’s history is littered with fanciful ideas that never panned out... it’s anyone’s guess as to whether a working Tesla Bot will ever see the light of day" and, in an editorial, described the Optimus reveal as a "bizarre and brilliant bit of tomfoolery".

IEEE Spectrum called the prototypes shown at the 2022 AI Day "an astonishing amount of work to be done in such a short time", while noting that other humanoid robot companies "likely have a head start over Tesla" in manufacturability, though Tesla could "rapidly catch up" by drawing on its car-building expertise. The Associated Press reported that Musk gave little evidence that Optimus was any more intelligent than robots developed by other companies and researchers. Robotics researcher Wafa Johal of the University of Melbourne wrote in The Conversation that she "didn't find the demonstration very impressive", but was "hopeful about the Optimus project", noting that Tesla had "plenty of resources to throw at the problem" and the capacity to mass-produce the robots "if development gets that far".

In a 2024 essay, Robert Silverberg wrote that Musk's plans for humanoid robots would "bring into ugly reality" the "overly helpful humanoid robots" of Jack Williamson's 1947 science fiction story "With Folded Hands...".

=== Expert opinions ===
Reactions across the robotics community to Optimus and its prototypes have been "diverse", with some experts commending the venture while describing early demonstrations as less than impressive.

Carl Berry, a lecturer of robotics engineering, described the 2021 AI Day presentation as "the usual overblown hype." Following the Optimus display at the Cyber Rodeo event, researcher Gary Marcus stated he would "bet that no robot will be able to do all human tasks by the end of 2023."

Regarding the 2022 AI Day presentation, Deutsche Welle cited experts – AI researcher Filip Piekniewski, robotics expert Cynthia Yeung, and executive director of Mass Robotics Tom Ryden – calling the project a "complete and utter scam", questioning how advanced it really was, and criticizing the choice of a humanoid form.

In 2025, Australian roboticist Rodney Brooks, the cofounder of Roomba vacuum creator iRobot, said the idea of humanoid robots as catchall assistants, the future Elon Musk envisions, is "pure fantasy thinking," in part because robots are coordination-challenged.

Also in 2025, Chris Walti, who worked at Tesla for 7 years and was the first team lead for Optimus until he left in 2022 to found a non-humanoid factory robot competitor, said that engineering humanoid robots was "multiple orders of magnitude" more difficult to solve than self-driving cars, and that humanoid robots were "kind of a ninth-inning robotics problem, and we're in the third inning."

== Name ==
Optimus is named after the main character in the Transformers media series, Optimus Prime.

Musk has used "Optimi" as the plural of Optimus.
