= Tesla Autopilot hardware =

Hardware used in Tesla autonomous driving systems

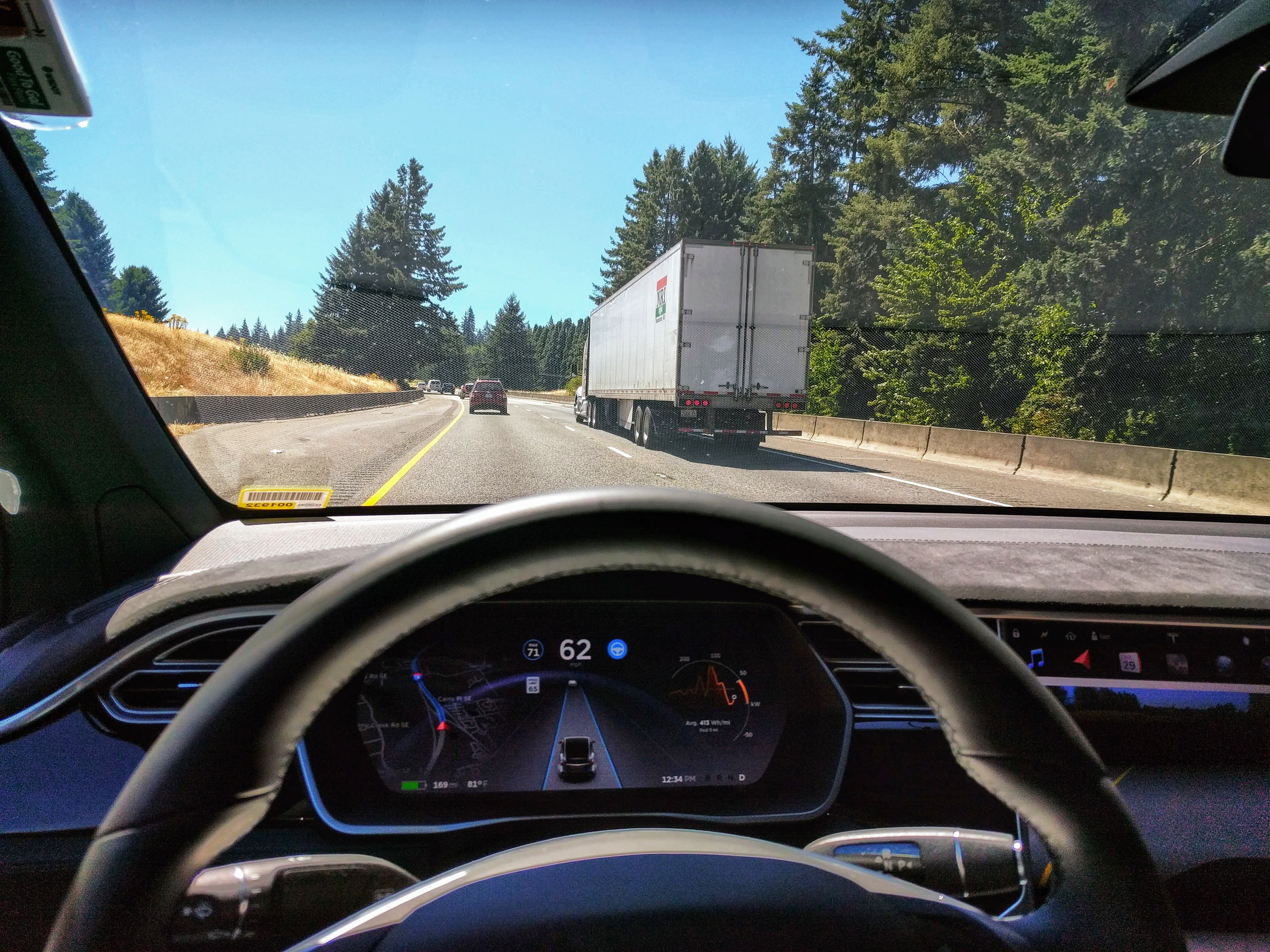
Tesla Autopilot in operation, 2017

Tesla Autopilot, an advanced driver-assistance system (ADAS) for Tesla vehicles, uses a suite of sensors and an onboard computer. It has undergone several hardware changes and versions since 2014, most notably moving to an all-camera-based system by 2023, in contrast with ADAS from other companies, which generally include radar and/or lidar sensors.

Initially, the ADAS used a combination of cameras capturing the visual spectrum, forward-facing radar, ultrasonic proximity sensors, and a Mobileye EyeQ3 computer as Hardware 1, fitted to Model S vehicles starting in October 2014. After Mobileye ended its partnership with Tesla in 2016, Tesla began shipping cars equipped with an Nvidia Drive PX 2 computer and an increased number of cameras as Hardware 2. In 2019, Tesla shifted to a computer using a custom "FSD Chip" designed by Tesla, branded as Hardware 3. Starting in 2021, Tesla stopped installing the radar sensor in new vehicles, and the ADAS was updated to drop radar support. In 2022, Tesla announced it also would drop support for the ultrasonic sensors, moving the ADAS to an all-visual system. The most recent sensor and computer implementation is Hardware 4, which began shipping in January 2023.

== Hardware versions ==
=== Hardware 1 ===
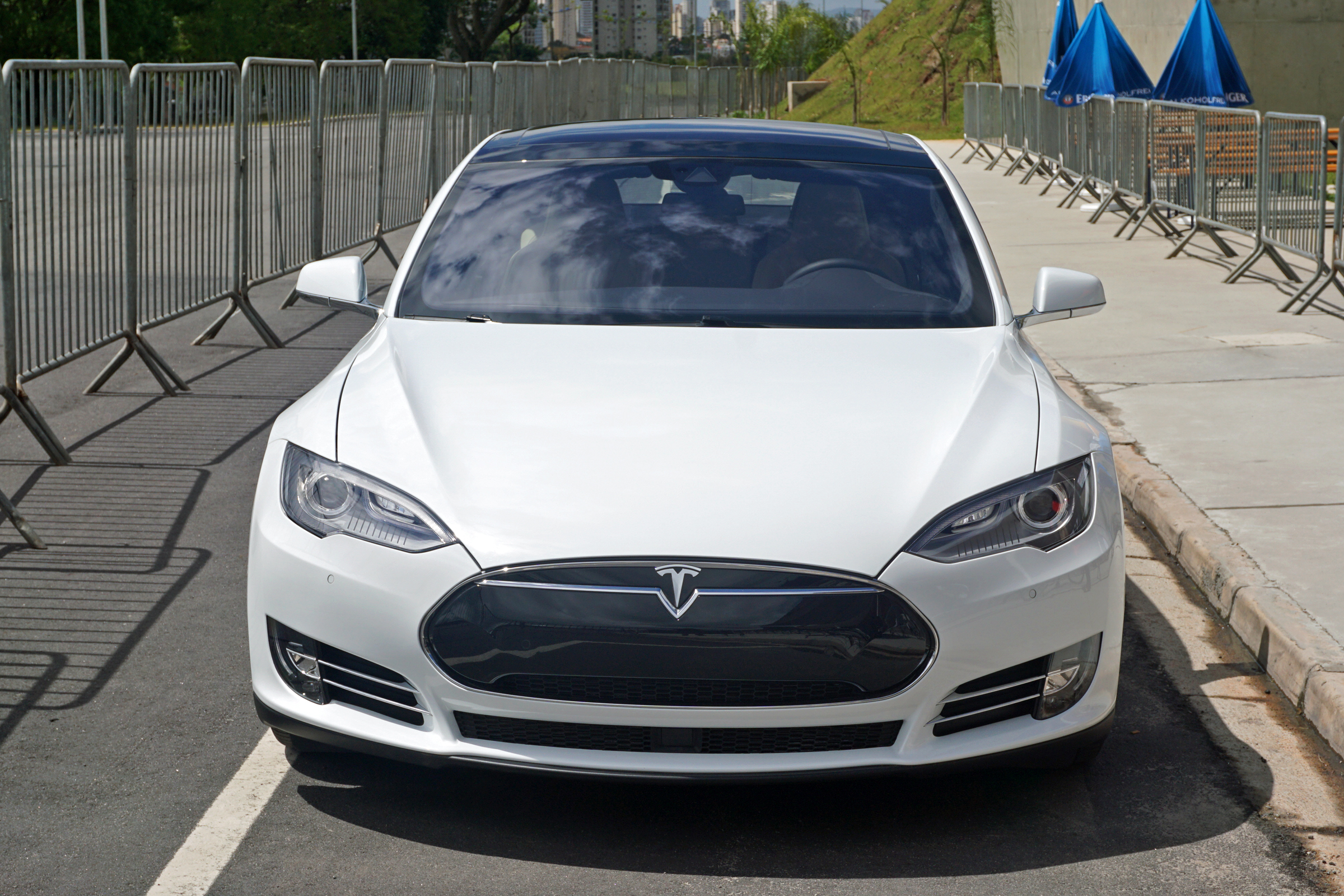
Tesla Model S with HW1

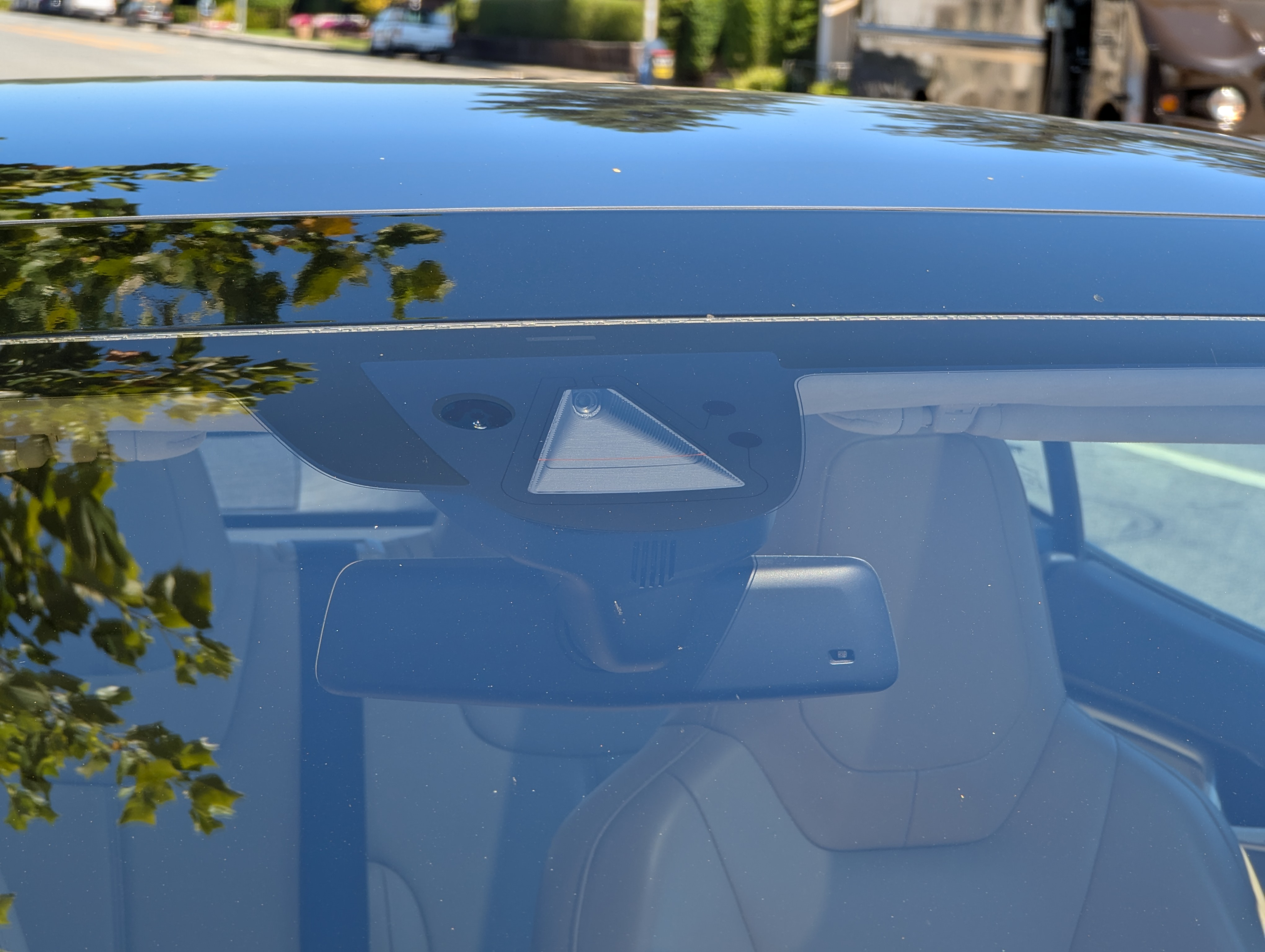
Hardware 1 uses a single front camera, mounted in the triangular-shaped cutout at the top center of the windshield.

Vehicles manufactured after late September 2014 are equipped with a single camera mounted at the top of the windshield, forward looking radar in the lower grille, and 12 ultrasonic acoustic location sensors in the front and rear bumpers that provide a 360-degree view around the car. The computer is the Mobileye EyeQ3; as implemented, this chip is built on a 40 nm process with a TDP of 2.5 W and a clock speed of 500 MHz. This equipment allows suitably equipped Tesla Model S and Model X vehicles to detect lane markings, obstacles, and other vehicles, enabling advanced driver-assistance functions branded Autosteer (automatic lane-keeping), Auto lane change, Autopark (parallel parking robot), and Side-collision warning. The EyeQ3 used a neural network approach, relying primarily on inputs from the camera to recognize and label objects to determine which potential areas in the camera's field of view are unoccupied and possible for the vehicle to travel through.

Auto lane change can be initiated by the driver turning on the lane changing signal when safe (due to the ultrasonic sensors' 5-metre limited range capability), and then the system completes the lane change. In 2016 the system did not detect pedestrians or cyclists, and while Autopilot detects motorcycles, there have been two instances of HW1 cars rear-ending motorcycles.

Tesla released a new version of Autopilot in September 2016 that changed the object detection algorithm to more fully use the radar sensor. Previously, primary obstacle detection responsibilities fell to the cameras and the radar was used in a secondary role to confirm their presence, but was not given the authority to initiate emergency braking alone. After the update, the radar data was given an equal role in object detection and made capable of identifying "dense obstacles," including "other vehicles, moose, or even alien spaceships," according to Musk. He added that Tesla "believes it would have" prevented the fatal May 2016 underride crash in Williston, Florida, in which Autopilot failed to detect a white trailer against the sky.

Mobileye ended its partnership with Tesla in 2016, stating that Tesla was "going to hurt the interests of [Mobileye] and hurt the interests of an entire industry, if a company of our reputation will continue to be associated with this type of pushing the envelope in terms of safety". Tesla responded that Mobileye backed away after learning Tesla was developing its own vision-based sensor system. Speculation immediately following the announcement included partnering with Nvidia and potentially designing its own ADAS computer. After Hardware 2 was released, an upgrade from Hardware 1 to Hardware 2 was not offered as it would have required substantial work and cost.

=== Hardware 2 ===
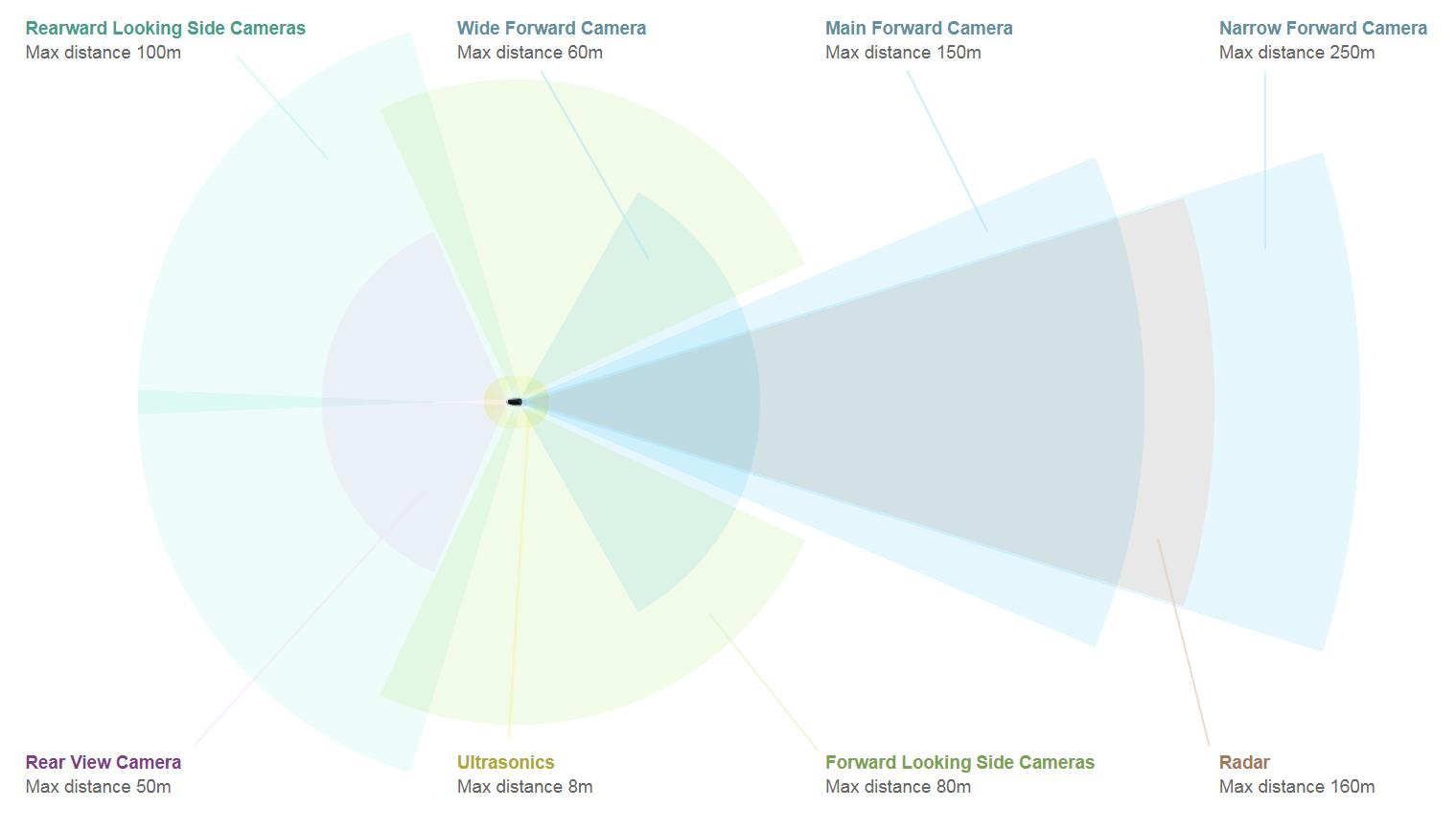
Tesla HW2 camera and radar coverage as shown on the company's website

HW2, included in vehicles manufactured after October 2016, includes an Nvidia Drive PX 2 computer. Tesla claimed that the hardware was capable of processing 200 frames per second. Elon Musk called HW2 "basically a supercomputer in a car", referring to its ability to perform up to 12 trillion floating point operations per second (TFlops), a performance similar to a $700 GTX 1080 Ti consumer graphics card at the time. The Autopilot computer hardware, housed just above the glovebox, is replaceable to allow for future upgrades. Tesla claimed the HW2 suite of sensors and computation provided the necessary equipment to allow FSD at SAE level 5.

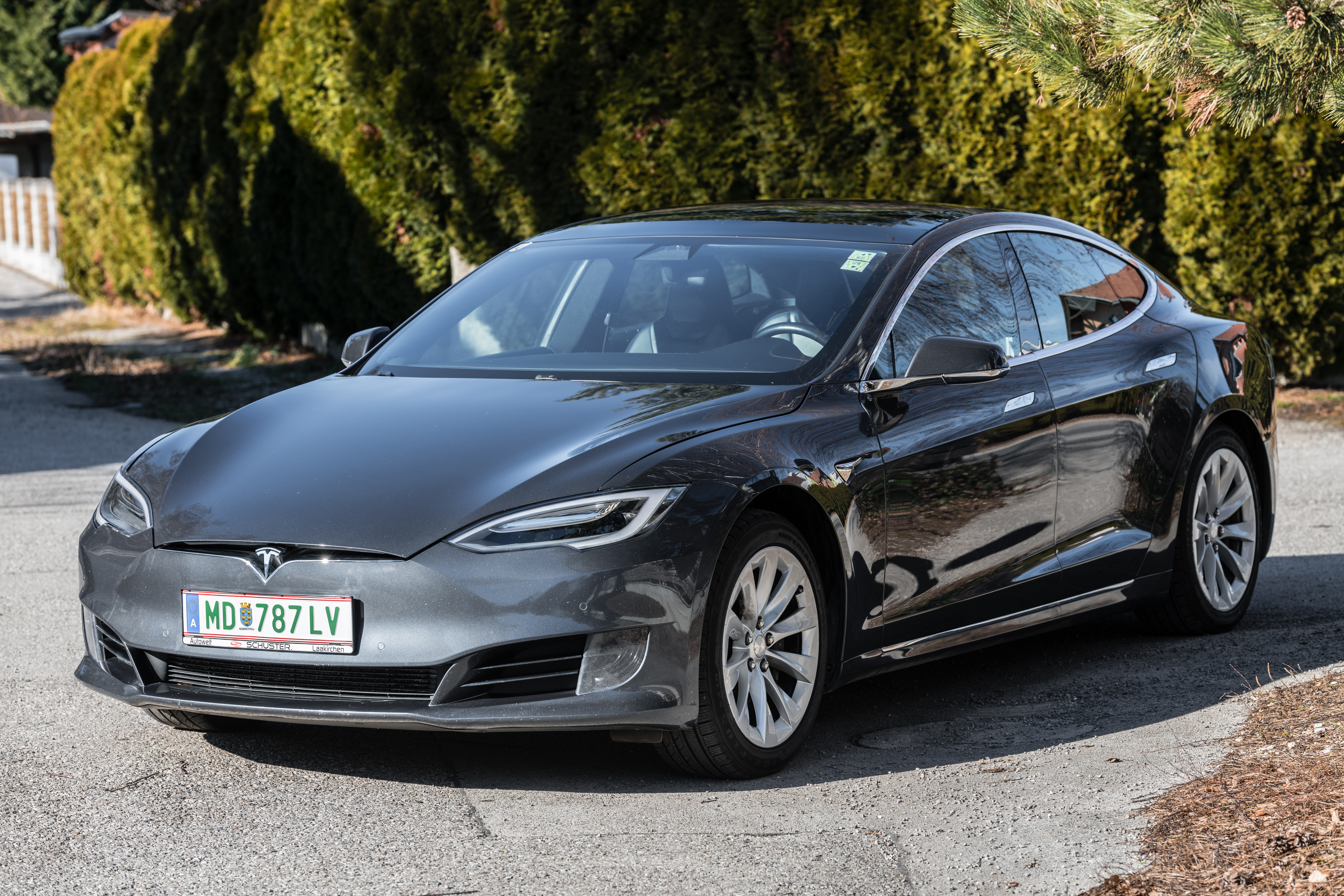
This Model S has HW2; note the wider cutout at the top center of the windshield to accommodate three forward-facing cameras

The hardware includes eight cameras covering an aggregate view of 360° around the car and 12 ultrasonic sensors, in addition to forward-facing radar with enhanced processing capabilities. The radar is able to observe beneath and ahead of the vehicle in front of the Tesla; the radar can see vehicles through heavy rain, fog or dust. The eight cameras are mounted in various locations around the vehicle: three forward-facing, next to the central rearview mirror mounted on the windshield; two front/side cameras, one each mounted in the left and right B-pillars; two rear/side cameras, mounted in the left and right front fender turn-signal repeaters; and one rear camera, above the license plate.

When "Enhanced Autopilot" was enabled in February 2017 by the v8.0 (17.5.36) software update, testing showed the system was limited to using one of the eight onboard cameras—the main forward-facing camera. The v8.1 software update released a month later enabled a second camera, the narrow-angle forward-facing camera. With all eight cameras enabled, data extracted from Autopilot in debugging mode showed the cameras provide a black-and-white feed to the computer, possibly to improve image processing speed.

The Tesla Model 3, introduced in 2017, and related Model Y, introduced in 2019, are equipped with an additional driver-facing in-cabin camera. This was disabled at launch and was intended to monitor the cabin remotely while the owner was operating the vehicle as an autonomous robotaxi, but was activated in May 2021 to monitor driver attentiveness while using Autopilot in vehicles without radar sensors.

==== Hardware 2.5 ====
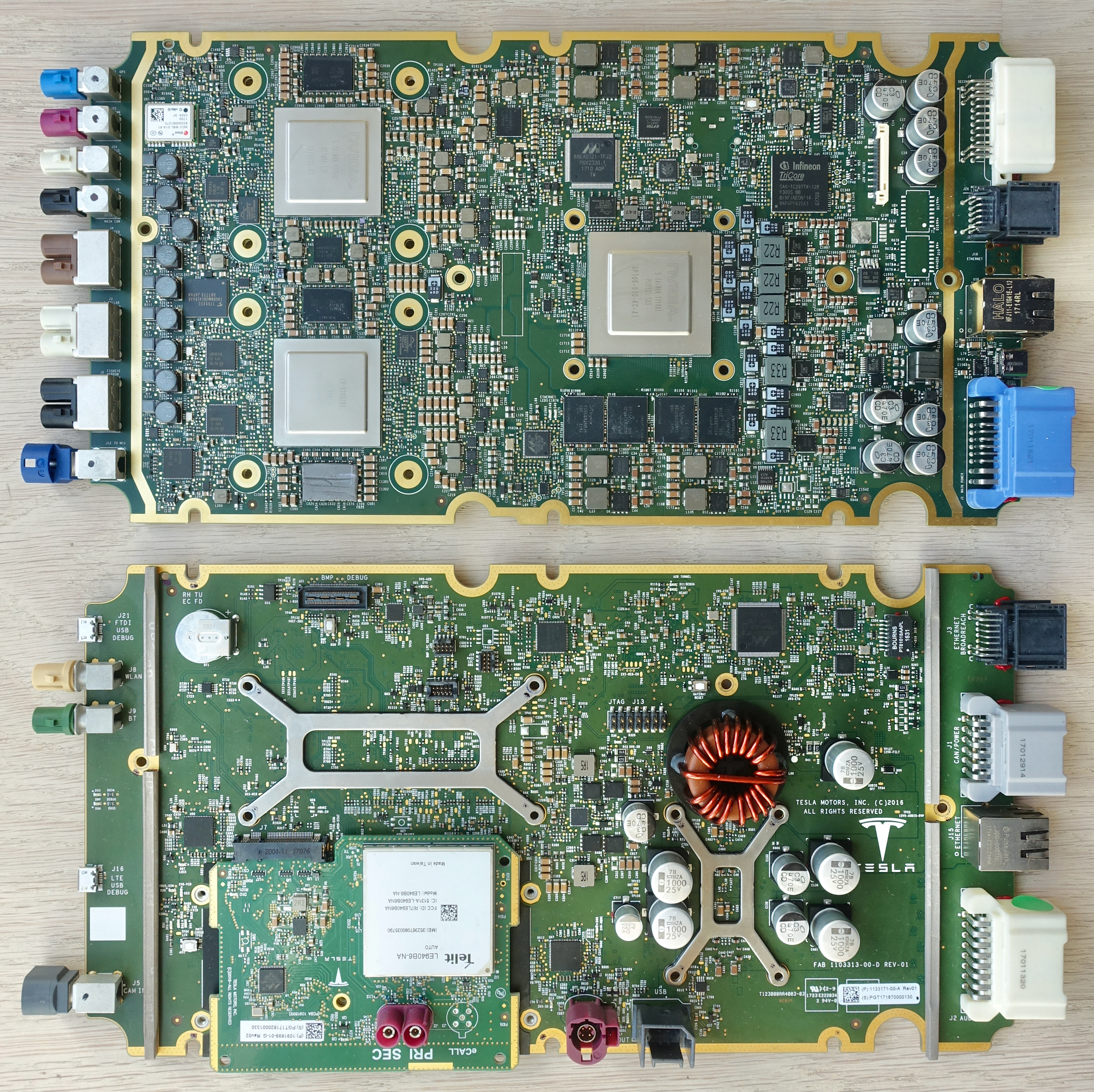
Tesla HW2.5 (top) and infotainment (bottom) boards

In August 2017, Tesla announced that HW2.5 included a secondary processor node to provide more computing power and additional wiring redundancy to slightly improve reliability; it also enabled dashcam and "sentry mode" capabilities. During this time, the supplier for the system's radar components was changed from Bosch to Continental, using the ARS4-B unit.

=== Hardware 3 ===
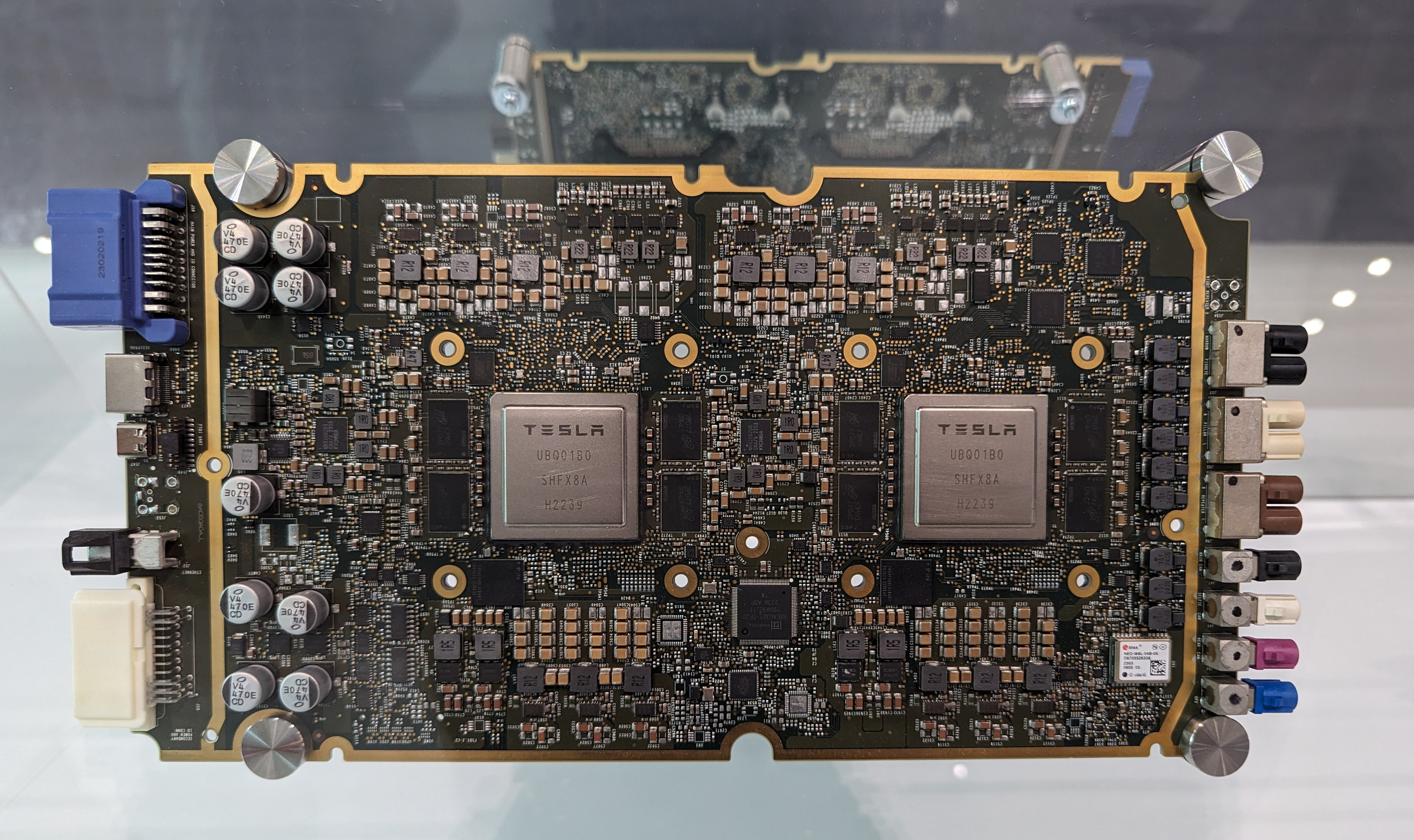
Tesla UBQ01B0 chips mounted on a Hardware 3 motherboard.

HW2/2.5/3 cameras

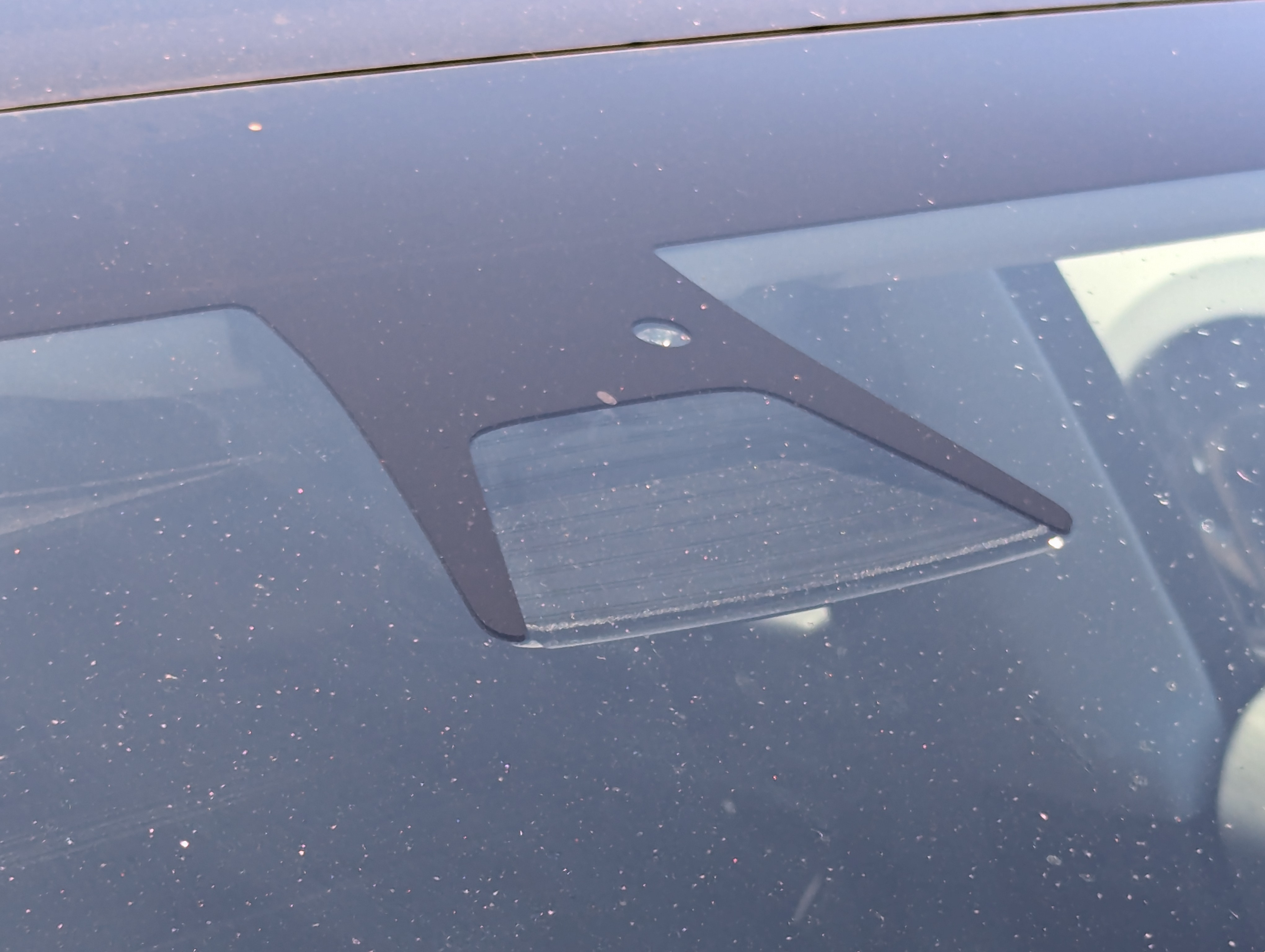
Front triple camera array

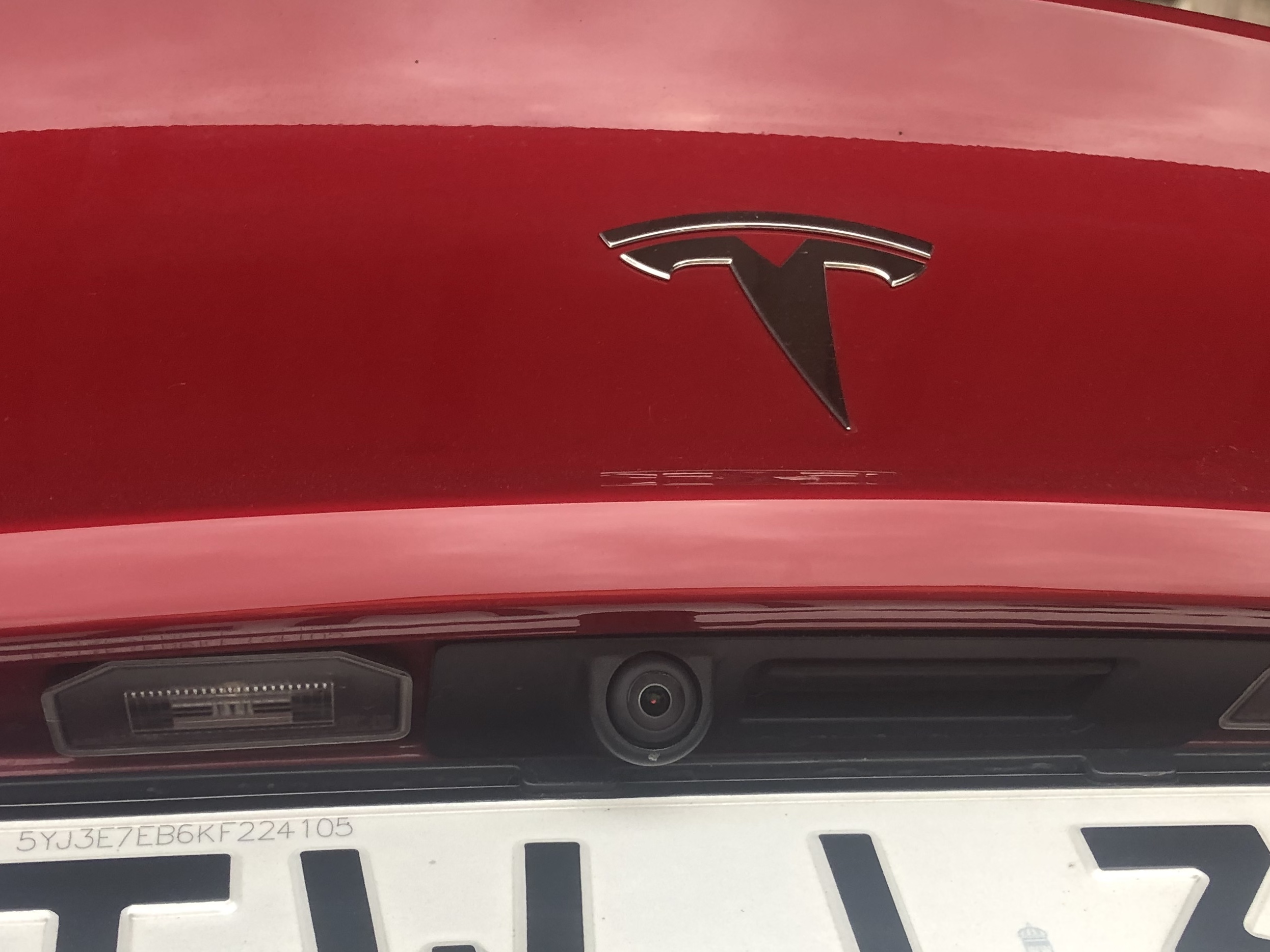
Model 3 rear camera

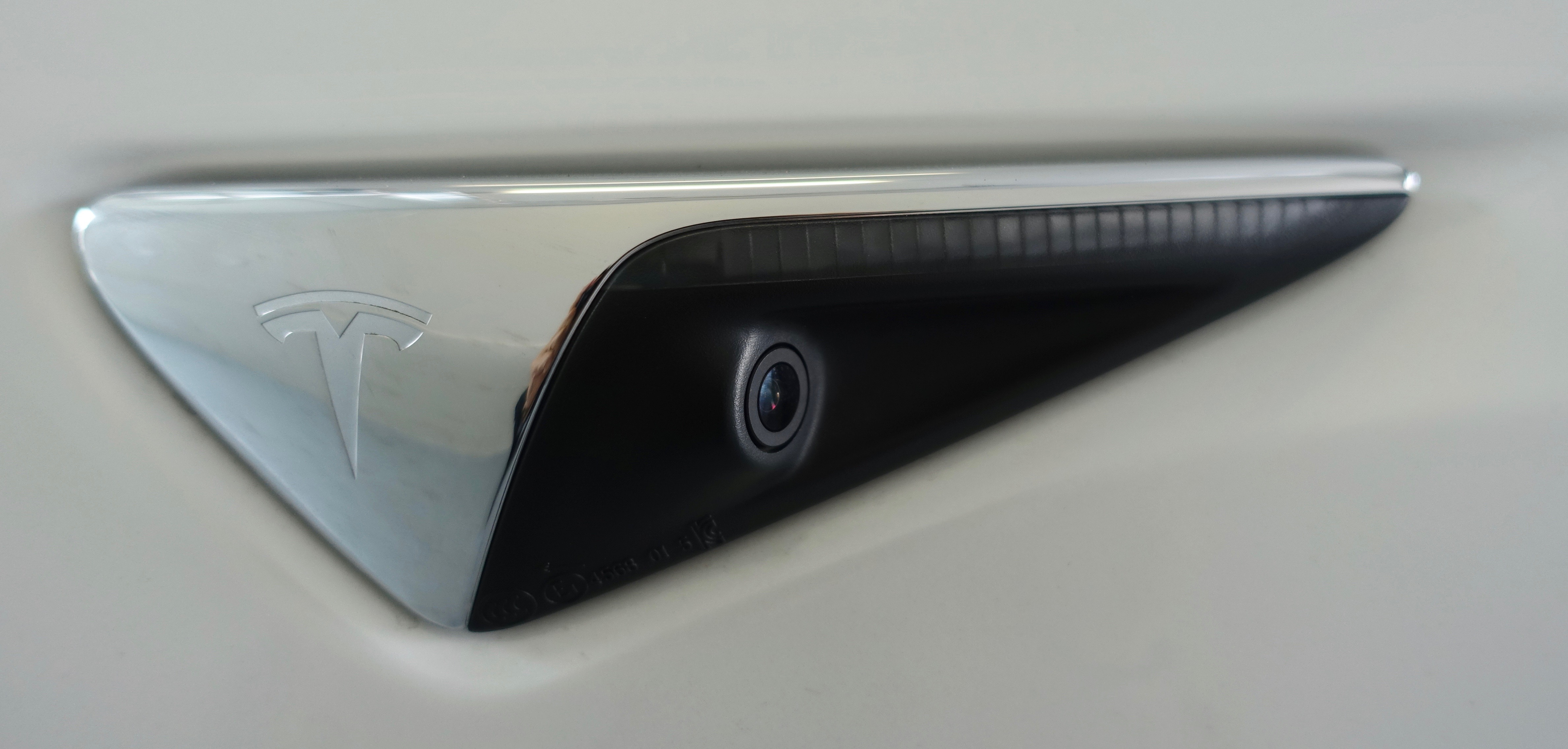
Model 3 side/rear camera in front fender badge / marker

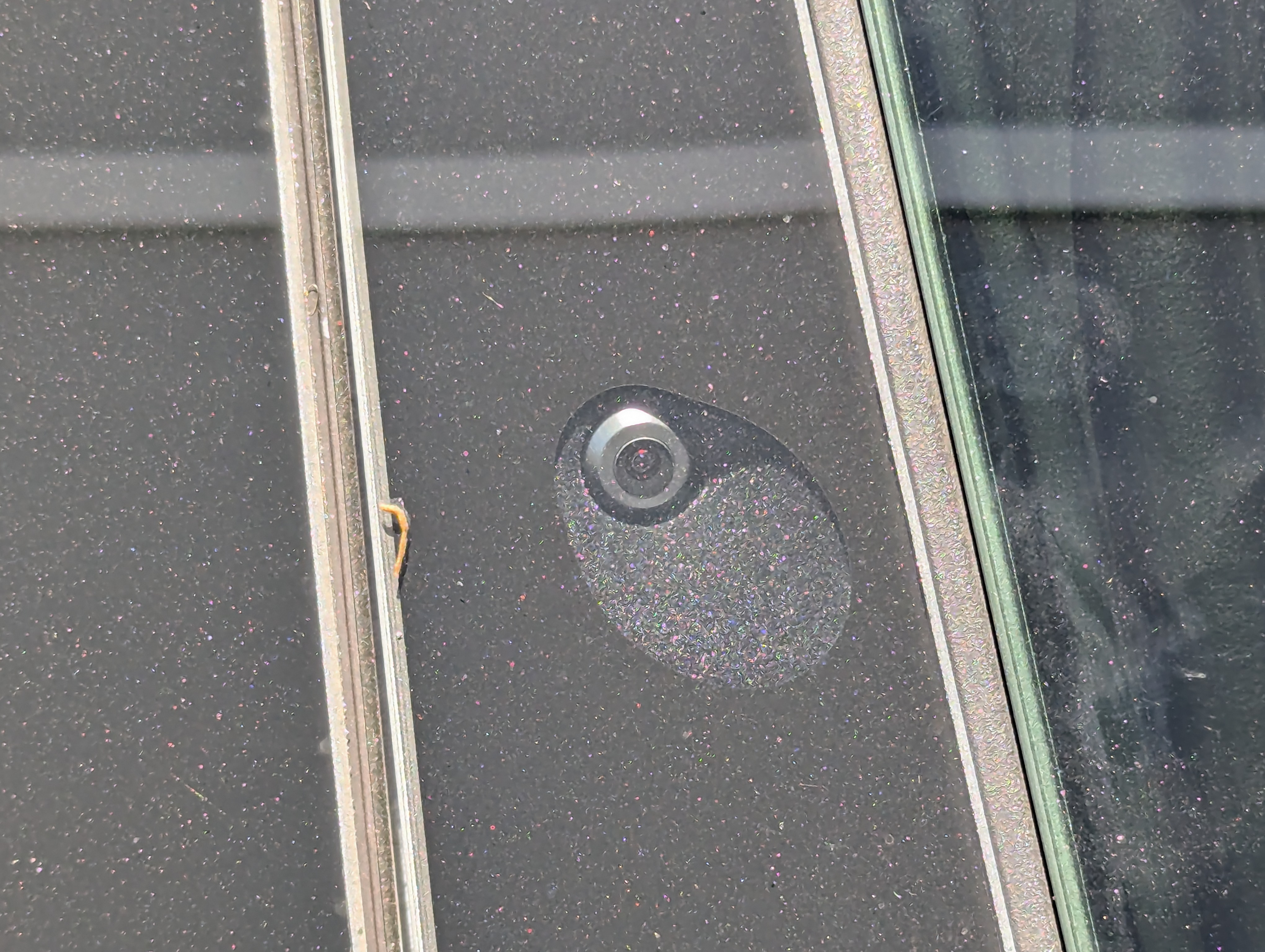
Side/front (oval cutout on B-pillar) camera

According to Tesla's director of Artificial Intelligence (AI) Andrej Karpathy, Tesla had, as of Q3 2018, trained large neural networks but they could not be deployed to Tesla vehicles built up to that time due to insufficient computational resources. HW3 was designed to run these neural networks. Overall, Tesla claims HW3 has 2.5× improved performance over HW2.5, with 1.25× higher power and 0.2× lower cost.

HW3 is based on a custom Tesla-designed system on a chip called "FSD Chip", fabricated using a 14 nm process by Samsung. Jim Keller and Pete Bannon, among other architects, have led the project since February 2016. FSD Chip features twelve ARM Cortex-A72 CPUs operating at 2.6 GHz, two systolic arrays (not unlike the approach of TPU) operating at 2 GHz and a Mali GPU operating at 1 GHz. Tesla claimed that FSD Chip processes images at 2,300 frames per second (fps), which is a 21× improvement over the 110 fps image processing capability of HW2.5. The firm described FSD Chip as a "neural network accelerator" custom-designed for Tesla AI processing. Each of the two systolic arrays on a single FSD Chip are capable of 36 trillion operations per second, and there are two FSD Chips for redundancy.

HW3 cars are equipped with eight cameras, in the same locations and covering the same directions as the HW2 and HW2.5 cameras. Each of the eight cameras supplied with HW3 use the same AR0136A image sensor supplied by Onsemi, which has a maximum resolution of 1280×960 (1.2-megapixel) and a 3.75 μm pixel size. Initial versions of HW3 also included a Continental ARS4-B radar module. The HW3 system board is the same physical size as the HW2.5 board, but carries more components. This makes it possible to upgrade from HW2 / HW2.5 to HW3, which was not possible during the prior generational change from HW1 to HW2/2.5.

The company claimed that HW3 was necessary for FSD, but not for "enhanced Autopilot" functions. The first availability of HW3 was April 2019. Customers with HW2 or HW2.5 who purchased the FSD package were promised an upgrade to HW3 without cost; however, when FSD Beta was released in 2021, Tesla owners who had subscribed to FSD and owned a vehicle with HW2 or HW2.5 were required to pay US$1500 to upgrade to HW3. Owners who had purchased FSD with a one-time fee as part of their initial vehicle acquisition were eligible for a free upgrade to HW3. Within days, Tesla reduced the cost of the upgrade to US$1000. In 2022, a Tesla owner in the State of Washington won a default judgment against Tesla which ordered the company to upgrade his vehicle to HW3 without cost; in the ruling, the judge cited Tesla's promises that all cars sold since 2016 included the hardware for FSD.

==== Tesla Vision ====
Tesla Vision camera coverage

In late May 2021, Elon Musk posted to Twitter that "Pure Vision Autopilot" was starting to be implemented. The system, which Tesla brands "Tesla Vision", eliminates the forward-facing radar starting in May 2021 from the Autopilot hardware package on Model 3 and Model Y vehicles built for the North American market. The Washington Post reported in March 2023 the immediate result was "an uptick in crashes, near misses and other embarrassing mistakes by Tesla vehicles suddenly deprived of a critical sensor." For vehicles without the forward radar, temporary limitations were applied to certain features such as Autosteer, and other features (Smart Summon and Emergency Lane Departure Avoidance) were disabled, but Tesla promised to restore the features "in the weeks ahead ... via a series of over-the-air software updates".

In response, Consumer Reports delisted the Model 3 from its Top Picks in 2021, and the Insurance Institute for Highway Safety (IIHS) announced plans to delist the Model 3 as a Top Safety Pick+, but after further testing, both organizations restored those designations. NHTSA rescinded the agency's check marks for forward collision warning, automatic emergency braking, lane departure warning, and dynamic brake support, applicable to Model 3 and Model Y vehicles built on or after April 27, 2021, but as of October 2022, those check marks have been restored.

In December 2021, the New York Times reported that Musk had made a unilateral decision to pursue the camera-only approach and had "repeatedly told members of the Autopilot team that humans could drive with only two eyes and that this meant cars should be able to drive with cameras alone." Several autonomous vehicle experts have denounced the analogy. According to former employees, Tesla engineers attempted to convince Musk that removing the radar could lead to crashes if the cameras became obscured, but Musk "was unconvinced and overruled" their objections. Brad Templeton noted that LIDAR "will never fail to see a train or truck, even if it doesn't know what it is. It knows there is an object in front and the vehicle can stop without knowing more than that." In contrast, Tesla Vision relies on the "Autopilot labeling team", hundreds of Tesla employees that view short video clips recorded by the cameras to label visible signs and objects, which trains the machine vision interpreter.

Tesla announced in October 2022 they would remove ultrasonic sensors by 2023; vehicles without the ultrasonic sensors would be shipped without Autopark, Park Assist, Summon, and Smart Summon features initially. Vehicles shipped in 2023 featured Park Assist, however it relied on the cameras to determine the distance from objects. In late 2023, Tesla rolled out High Fidelity Park Assist for AMD-equipped vehicles. Throughout 2024, additional features were rolled out, including Summon (renamed to Dumb Summon) and the revamped Autopark and Smart Summon (named Actually Smart Summon).

=== Hardware 4 ===
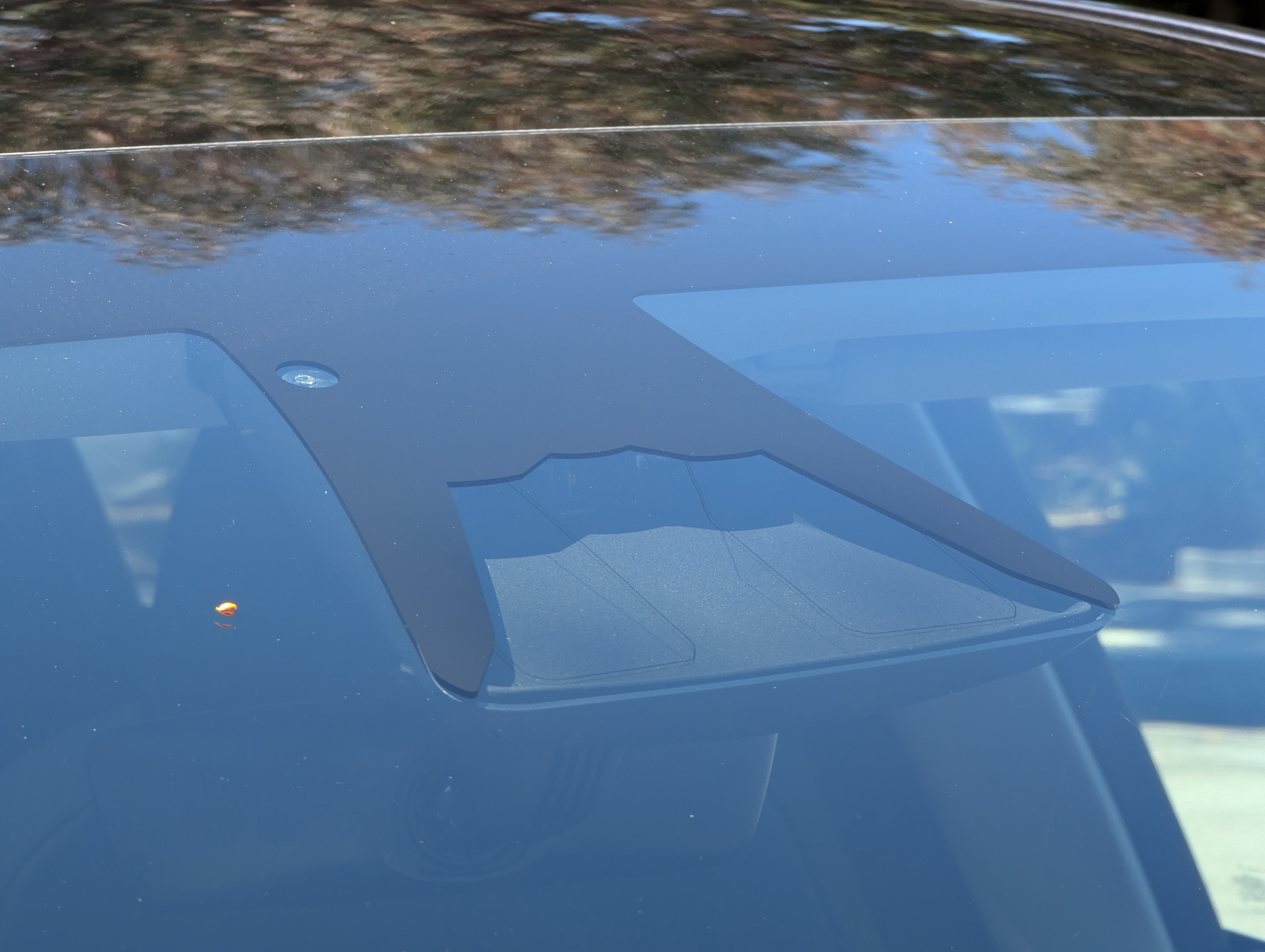
HW4 front camera array on Model Y; note relocated ambient light sensor (facing sky) and defogger wires

Samsung manufactures the processor for Hardware 4 (HW4) in Hwasung, South Korea, on a 7 nm process. The custom System on a chip (SoC) is called "FSD Computer 2". According to a teardown of a production HW4 unit in August 2023, the board has 16 GB of RAM and 256 GB of storage, which are two and four times the RAM and storage in HW3, respectively. Musk stated that HW4 computational capabilities are three to eight times more powerful than HW3.

Tesla started shipping cars with HW4 in January 2023, starting with the refreshed Model S and Model Y; however, it took six months before HW4-based cars ran camera-based software. Despite the increased image sensor resolution with HW4-equipped cars, initial software for HW4 ran the FSD software by emulating HW3, including downsizing the camera images. FSD v13.2.1 is the first software version to use the native resolution of all cameras and as of December 2024 FSD v13 is only available for cars equipped with HW4.

In October 2025, Tesla added front bumper cameras across the line up, though retrofits to older HW4 vehicles have not been offered.

Tesla updated the front-facing camera's housing in January 2026, sealing the cameras from the cabin, in an attempt to remedy issues of plastics in the dashboard and camera housing releasing chemicals, which can get trapped inside the semi-sealed camera enclosure and impact clarity.

==== Hardware 4.5 (label mistake) ====
In late December 2025, Tesla started shipping Model Ys manufactured in Fremont, California with parts labeled hardware 4.5. In January 2026, Tesla stated the label was a mistake.

==== Hardware 4 plus (AI4.1 or AI4+) ====
At the Tesla Q1 earnings call on April 22, 2026, Elon Musk announced that HW4 will be receiving an upgrade named AI4.1, with newer-generation memory chips, the memory size going from 16GB to 32GB per chip (64GB total for the two chips in the configuration), and a 10% increase in computing power and memory bandwidth. AI4.1 (or AI4+ or HW4 plus) was scheduled to begin production in 2027.

In July 2026, increased memory in the Tesla Cybercab FSD hardware configuration was reported. In September 2026, the Cybercab was reported to have "similar autopilot computer to HW4 with some iterative updates".

=== AI5 (Hardware 5) ===
Musk announced Hardware 5 (HW5), being named AI5, during the Tesla annual meeting on June 13, 2024. Musk stated it was scheduled for release in January 2026, and would be ten times more powerful than HW4. Musk also stated that it will use up to 800 watts when processing complex environments, versus up to 100 watts for HW3 and 160 watts for HW4.

The release date was revised during the Q2 2025 earnings call to the end of 2026, and in January 2026, Musk again revised the date to early 2027, and said AI5 will be the last hardware iteration installed in vehicles, but in April 2026, he said that AI5 will not be used for cars and will be used for "Optimus and [Tesla's] supercomputer clusters. AI4 is enough to achieve much better than human safety for FSD."

=== AI6 ===
In July 2025, Tesla announced it had signed a deal with Samsung to make chips, including the AI6 chip. In a January 2026 X post, Musk said that AI6 was no longer planned for vehicle use, but only for Tesla's Optimus robot and data centers.

=== Potential future hardware ===
In June 2022, Tesla filed an application with the US Federal Communications Commission (FCC) to use a new radar module in future vehicles. Based on filings with the Chinese government and a prototype Tesla Model 3 spotted in December 2022, online news outlet AutoEvolution argued that a future Autopilot hardware version could include radar, as well as high-resolution cameras accompanied by defogging systems. An updated filing with the FCC in 2023 indicates the proposed radar module is not likely to be high-resolution, in contrast to the automotive radar modules used in other manufacturers' cars.

== Hardware comparison ==
Summary
Hardware name	Hardware 1	Hardware 2.0 (Note: All cars sold after October 2016 are equipped with Hardware 2.0, which includes eight cameras (covering a complete 360° around the car), one forward-facing radar, and twelve sonars (also covering a complete 360°). Buyers may choose an extra-cost option to purchase either the "Enhanced Autopilot" or "Full Self-Driving" to enable features. Front and side collision mitigation features are standard on all cars.)	Hardware 2.5 (Note: Also known as "Hardware 2.1"; includes added computing and wiring redundancy for improved reliability.)	Hardware 3 (Note: Tesla described the previous computer as a supercomputer capable of full self-driving.)			Hardware 4
Initial availability date	2014	October 2016	August 2017	April 2019	May 2021	October 2022	January 2023
Computers
Platform	MobilEye EyeQ3	Nvidia DRIVE PX 2 AI computing platform	Nvidia DRIVE PX 2 with secondary node enabled	Two identical Tesla-designed "FSD 1 Chip" (12 core) processors			Two identical Tesla-designed "FSD 2 Chip" (20 core) processors
Sensors
Forward radar	160 m (525 ft)		170 m (558 ft)		None (Note: Radar hardware is not installed in Model 3 and Model Y vehicles built for the North American market and delivered in May 2021 or later, while Model S and Model X vehicles retain radar hardware. In November 2021, Tesla China also removed radar. Vehicles operating with Tesla FSD Beta do not use radar even if vehicle has the hardware.)		Model S & X: 300 m (984 ft) Model 3 & Y: None
Ultrasonic	12 surrounding with 5 m (16 ft) range	12 surrounding with 8 m (26 ft) range				None	
Front / Side camera color filter array	N/A	RCCC	RCCB				
Forward cameras	1 monochrome	3: Narrow (35°): 250 m (820 ft); Main (50°): 150 m (490 ft); Wide (120°): 60 m (195 ft)					Main (50°): 150 m (490 ft); Wide (120°): 60 m (195 ft) Bumper Camera
Forward looking side cameras	N/A	Left (90°): 80 m (260 ft); Right (90°): 80 m (260 ft)					5 megapixel
Rearward looking side cameras	N/A	Left: 100 m (330 ft); Right: 100 m (330 ft)					5 megapixel

== Feature history ==
Feature history
Hardware			Year	Function	Description	Requirements		
HW1	HW2	HW3+	Year	Function	Description	AP	EA	FSD
Yes	Yes	Yes	2014	Over-the-air updates	Autopilot updates received as part of recurring Tesla software updates.	Yes	Yes	Yes
Yes	Yes	Yes	2014	Safety Features	If Autopilot detects a potential front or side collision with another vehicle, bicycle or pedestrian within a distance of 525 feet (160 m), it sounds a warning. Autopilot also has automatic emergency braking that detects objects that may hit the car and applies the brakes, and the car may also automatically swerve out of the way to prevent a collision.	Yes	Yes	Yes
Yes	Yes	Yes	2014	Visualization	System generates a visualization of what it sees around it, including lane lines and vehicles in front, behind and on either side of it (in other lanes). It also displays lane markings and speed limits (via its cameras and what it knows from maps). On HW3, it displays stop signs and traffic signals. It distinguishes pedestrians, bicyclists/motorcyclists, small cars, SUVs, pickup trucks, buses, and large semi-trucks.	Yes	Yes	Yes
Yes	Yes	Yes	2014	Speed Assist	Front-facing cameras detect speed limit signs and compare them against map data to display those limits on the dashboard center display even if no signs are detected.	Yes	Yes	Yes
No	Yes	Yes	2018	Obstacle Aware Acceleration	Reduces acceleration when an obstacle is detected in the path of travel while driving at low speeds.	Yes	Yes	Yes
No	Yes	Yes	2019	Blind spot monitoring	Sounds warning chime when an obstacle is detected while changing lanes.	Yes	Yes	Yes
Yes	Yes	Yes	2014	Traffic Aware Cruise Control	Also known as adaptive cruise control, the ability to maintain a safe distance from the vehicle in front of it by accelerating and braking as that vehicle speeds up and slows down. It also slows on tight curves, on interstate ramps, and when another car enters or exits the road in front of the car. It can be enabled at any speed between 0 mph and 90 mph. By default, it sets the limit at the current speed limit and adjusts its target speed according to changes in speed limits. If road conditions warrant, Autosteer and cruise control disengage and an audio and visual signal indicate that the driver must assume full control.	Yes	Yes	Yes
Yes	Yes	Yes	2014	Autosteer	Steers the car to remain in whatever lane it is in (lane keeping). It is able to safely change lanes when the driver taps the turn signal stalk. On divided highways, HW2 and HW3 cars limit use of the feature to 90 mph (145 km/h), and on non-divided highways, the limit is five miles over the speed limit or 45 mph (72 km/h) if no speed limit is detected. If the driver ignores three audio warnings about controlling the steering wheel within an hour, Autopilot disables until a new journey is begun.	Yes	Yes	Yes
No	Yes	Yes	2019	Emergency Lane Departure Avoidance	Steers to prevent departing from a lane that may have a chance of collision.	Yes	Yes	Yes
Yes	Yes	Yes	2019	Lane Departure Avoidance	Steers to maintain lane centering.	Yes	Yes	Yes
Yes	Yes	Yes	2014	Lane Departure Warning	Warns the driver when the vehicle begins to move out of lane centering.	Yes	Yes	Yes
No	Yes	Yes	2016	Navigate on Autopilot	A set of features consisting of automatically 'guiding through highway interchanges and exits' including 'lane changes on certain roads'. As of 2019, it navigates freeway interchanges fully from onramp to offramp, including automatic lane changes.	No	Yes	Yes
No	Yes	Yes	2014	Automatic Lane Change	Lane changing without driver initiation.	No	Yes	Yes
Yes	Yes	Yes	2015	Autopark	Parks the car in perpendicular or parallel parking spaces on either side of the road, with the car backing into spaces, without driver supervision. In 2024, Tesla enabled vision-based Autopark for vehicles running Hardware 3 and higher.	No	Yes	Yes
Yes	Yes	Yes	2014	Summon	Moves car forward or backward in tight spaces using the key fob or the Tesla app, without the driver in the car.	No	Yes	Yes
No	Yes	Yes	2019	Smart Summon	Enables remote car retrieval in parking lots using the key fob or Tesla phone app from up to 150 ft (46 m) away. Smart Summon uses the ultrasonic sensors for navigation and requires users to maintain line of sight with the vehicle.	No	Yes	Yes
No	No	Yes	2019	Traffic Signs Aware	Traffic light, stop sign and yield sign recognition.	No	No	Yes
No	No	Yes	2020	Traffic Light and Stop Sign Control	When using Traffic-Aware Cruise Control or Autosteer, this feature will stop for stop signs and red traffic lights, and will proceed through green lights. Even when Autopilot is not engaged, the system can chime when the traffic light turns green.	No	No	Yes
No	No	Yes	2023	Autopilot on city streets	Enables in-city navigation under FSD.	No	No	Yes
No	No	Yes	2024	Actually Smart Summon	Enables remote vehicle retrieval in parking lots using the Tesla phone app from up to 280 ft (85 m) away. Actually Smart Summon uses the vehicle's onboard cameras for navigation and requires users to maintain line of sight with the vehicle.	No	Yes	Yes
