= AWS Graviton =

Family of Arm-based CPUs designed by Amazon Web Services

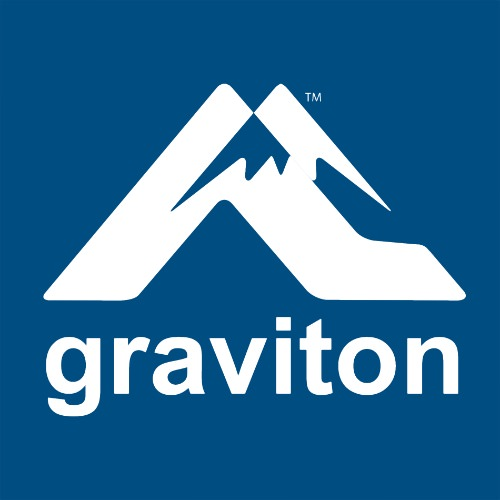

General information
- Launched: November 26, 2018; 7 years ago
- Designed by: Amazon Web Services / Annapurna Labs

Physical specifications
- Cores: 16 to 192

Architecture and classification
- Microarchitecture: ARM Cortex-A72, Neoverse N1, V1, V2 and V3
- Instruction set: AArch64

AWS Graviton is a family of 64-bit Arm-based central processing units designed by Amazon Web Services (AWS) for use in its cloud computing infrastructure. The processors are part of AWS's custom silicon program and are used in Amazon Elastic Compute Cloud (EC2) instance families and other AWS services.

The first Graviton-powered EC2 instances were announced in November 2018. Later generations increased core count and added Arm Neoverse cores, newer Arm architecture revisions, higher memory bandwidth and additional vector-instruction support.

== Background ==
AWS developed Graviton after Amazon's acquisition of Annapurna Labs, an Israeli microelectronics company, in 2015. Wired reported that the Graviton project was initiated by the Annapurna Labs team and was intended to allow AWS to more closely integrate processor, server and cloud-service design than would be possible using only merchant processors from Intel or AMD.

AWS's first major Annapurna-developed infrastructure product was the AWS Nitro System, a combination of hardware and software used to offload virtualization, storage, networking and security functions from the main server CPU. Graviton extended this custom-silicon strategy to general-purpose compute instances.

== Design ==
Graviton processors implement the AArch64 execution state of the Arm architecture. AWS states that each Graviton virtual CPU corresponds to a full physical CPU core, rather than to a simultaneous multithreading thread. Graviton2 and later generations use Arm Neoverse server cores, while the first-generation Graviton used Cortex-A72 cores.

AWS documents Graviton processors as having fixed operating frequencies and no turbo mode for Graviton2 and later generations. Later generations added support for Arm features such as Scalable Vector Extension (SVE), SVE2, pointer authentication and Branch Target Identification, depending on the generation.

== Generations ==
AWS Graviton generations
Generation	First announced or available	Representative EC2 instance families	Core design	Architecture revision	Cores	Frequency	Memory	Notes
Graviton	November 2018	A1	Cortex-A72	Armv8-A	16	2.3 GHz	—	First AWS-designed Arm server processor; used in A1 instances for scale-out workloads.
Graviton2	December 2019	M6g, C6g, R6g, T4g, X2gd, G5g, I4g, Im4gn, Is4gen	Neoverse N1	Armv8.2-A	64	2.5 GHz	8-channel DDR4	AWS described Graviton2 as providing more cores, larger private caches and faster memory than the first Graviton.
Graviton3	November 2021; C7g generally available May 2022	C7g, C7gd, M7g, M7gd, R7g, R7gd	Neoverse V1	Armv8.4-A	64	2.6 GHz	8-channel DDR5	Added SVE, bfloat16 and other features. AWS stated that Graviton3-based C7g instances delivered up to 25% higher compute performance than comparable Graviton2-based C6g instances.
Graviton3E	November 2022	C7gn, Hpc7g	Neoverse V1	Armv8.4-A	64	2.6 GHz	8-channel DDR5	Higher-power variant of Graviton3 used in network-optimized and high-performance computing instances.
Graviton4	Preview announced November 2023; R8g generally available July 2024	C8g, M8g, R8g, X8g, I8g	Neoverse V2	Armv9.0-A	96 per socket	2.8 GHz; 2.7 GHz on 48xlarge instances	12-channel DDR5	Added SVE2 and doubled L2 cache per core compared with Graviton3. AWS stated that R8g instances delivered up to 30% better performance than Graviton3-based R7g instances.
Graviton5	Preview announced December 2025; M9g and M9gd generally available June 2026	M9g, M9gd	Neoverse V3	Armv9.2-A	192	3.3 GHz	12-channel DDR5	Fifth-generation Graviton processor. AWS states that Graviton5 uses 3 nm manufacturing technology, has a larger shared L3 cache than Graviton4 and supports PCIe Gen 6.

== First generation ==
The first Graviton processor was introduced with the EC2 A1 instance family in November 2018. It used 16 Cortex-A72 cores at 2.3 GHz and supported the Armv8-A instruction set. AWS positioned A1 instances for scale-out workloads such as containerized microservices, web servers, development environments and caching fleets.

== Graviton2 ==
AWS announced Graviton2 in December 2019 with the M6g, C6g and R6g instance families. Graviton2 moved from Cortex-A72 to Arm Neoverse N1 cores, increased the maximum core count to 64 and used a 7 nm manufacturing process according to AWS. AWS stated that the processor provided seven times the performance of the first-generation Graviton, four times the number of compute cores and five times faster memory.

== Graviton3 and Graviton3E ==
Graviton3 was announced at AWS re:Invent 2021 and became generally available in C7g instances in May 2022. It used Neoverse V1 cores, DDR5 memory and Armv8.4-A features including SVE and bfloat16 support. AWS stated that Graviton3 delivered up to 25% higher compute performance, up to twice the floating-point performance and 50% faster memory access than Graviton2.

Graviton3E, announced in 2022, is a variant used in C7gn and Hpc7g instances. AWS described it as having higher vector-instruction processing performance than Graviton3.

== Graviton4 ==
Graviton4 was announced in November 2023 with a preview of R8g memory-optimized instances. R8g instances became generally available in July 2024. The processor uses Arm Neoverse V2 cores and Armv9.0-A, with 96 cores per socket, 2 MB of L2 cache per core and 12 DDR5 memory channels.

AWS stated that Graviton4-based R8g instances delivered up to 30% better performance than Graviton3-based R7g instances, and up to 40% faster database performance and 45% faster large Java application performance.

== Graviton5 ==
Graviton5 was announced in December 2025 with a preview of M9g general-purpose EC2 instances, and M9g and M9gd instances became generally available in June 2026. AWS states that Graviton5 has 192 cores, uses Arm Neoverse V3 cores, implements Armv9.2-A and runs at 3.3 GHz.

According to AWS, Graviton5 uses 3 nm manufacturing technology, has more than 5 times larger L3 cache than Graviton4, supports PCIe Gen 6 and provides higher network and EBS bandwidth in M9g and M9gd instances. AWS also stated that M9g instances provide up to 25% better compute performance than Graviton4-based M8g instances.

== Software support ==
AWS provides migration and optimization guidance for running software on Graviton instances. Its technical guide documents compiler flags, instruction-set differences, operating-system support, language-specific considerations and support for software such as containers, Java, .NET, Python, Node.js, Rust, PostgreSQL, MySQL and machine-learning frameworks.

Because Graviton uses the Arm architecture rather than x86-64, software that depends on x86-specific instructions, binary-only x86 libraries or x86 container images may require porting or replacement. AWS provides tools and documentation for identifying such compatibility issues.

== See also ==
- The official AWS Graviton Technical Guide
- Timeline of Amazon Web Services
- AWS Nitro System
- Annapurna Labs
- ARM Neoverse
- Ampere Altra
- Fujitsu A64FX
