= Annapurna Labs =

Israel-based microelectronics company

Annapurna Labs is Amazon's semiconductor division building Amazon's Nitro, Graviton, and Trainium chips product lines. Annapurna was established in Israel in 2011 by Hrvoje Bilic and Nafea Bshara, and acquired by Amazon in January 2015. It is now a wholly owned subsidiary of Amazon.com. Annapurna is one of the largest fabless semiconductor companies in the world, and top 5 customers of TSMC.

== History ==
Annapurna Labs, named after the Annapurna Massif in the Himalayas, was co-founded in 2011 by Bilic "Billy" Hrvoje, a Bosnian Jewish refugee in Haifa, Nafea Bshara, an Arab Israeli in Silicon Valley, and Ronen Boneh with investments from the independent investors Avigdor Willenz, Manuel Alba, Andy Bechtolsheim, the venture capital firm Walden International, Arm Holdings, and TSMC. Board members include Avigdor Willenz, Manuel Alba, and Lip-Bu Tan, the CEO of Intel.

The first product launched under the AWS umbrella was the AWS Nitro hardware, first deployment in AWS EC2 4th generation servers starting in 2014 (EC2 C4, M4, D2), and evolved into full hypervisor offload with introduction of Nitro Hypervisor in November 2017. Following on from Nitro, Annapurna developed general-purpose CPUs under the Graviton family and machine-learning ASICs under the Trainium and Inferentia brands.

Annapurna Labs has delivered 7 generations of Nitro chip, driving the network and storage performance from initial version of 10Gbps to 7th generation of 1600Gbps. Every AWS server since 2015 is exclusively based on Nitro hardware for networking (VPC), storage (EBS), and local NVMe storage.

Five generation of Graviton, each delivering more than 25% price-performance improvement per core, with Graviton1 using 16 cores and 2 DDR4 channels to Graviton5 with 192 cores and 12 DDR5 channels in single chip. 98% of top 1000 AWS customers run on Graviton, and majority of AWS services like RedShift, RDS, ElasticCache, etc run on Graviton.

Three generations of Trainium are shipping, with Trainium2 powering project Rainier, running Anthropic's Claude models. Both Anthropic and OpenAI announced large deals running on Trainium3. Trainium4 details were shared in AWS re:invent 2025.

== See also ==
- AWS Graviton - an ARM-based CPU developed by Annapurna Labs for exclusive use by Amazon Web Services.
