= IQOO Neo9 =

Flagship gaming Android smartphone from iQOO

iQOO Neo9 iQOO Neo9 Pro
- Brand: iQOO
- Manufacturer: Vivo
- Type: Smartphone
- Series: iQOO Neo
- Family: Neo Series
- First released: December 30, 2023; 2 years ago
- Predecessor: iQOO Neo8
- Successor: iQOO Neo10
- Compatible networks: GSM / CDMA / HSPA / CDMA2000 / LTE / 5G
- Form factor: Slate
- Colors: Black, Blue, Red
- Dimensions: 163.5 mm (6.44 in) H 75.7 mm (2.98 in) W 8.3 mm (0.33 in) D
- Weight: 190 g (6.7 oz)
- Operating system: China: Original: Origin OS 4 (Based on Android 14); Current: Origin OS 5 (Based on Android 15); India: Current: Funtouch OS 14 (Based on Android 14)
- System-on-chip: Qualcomm Snapdragon 8 Gen 2 (4 nm)
- CPU: Octa-core (1x3.2 GHz Cortex-X3 & 2x2.8 GHz Cortex-A715 & 2x2.8 GHz Cortex-A710 & 3x2.0 GHz Cortex-A510)
- GPU: Adreno 740
- Memory: 12GB/16GB RAM
- Storage: 256GB/512GB/1TB
- Removable storage: Not Supported
- SIM: Dual nano-SIM
- Battery: 5160 mAh
- Charging: 120 W wired (40% in 9 min), Reverse wired
- Rear camera: Dual: 50 MP (wide, f/1.9, 1/1.49", PDAF, OIS) + 8 MP (ultrawide, f/2.2, 119˚)
- Front camera: 16 MP (wide, f/2.5)
- Display: 6.78 in (172 mm) LTPO AMOLED, 144Hz, HDR10+, 1B colors, 1400 nits (HBM), 1260 x 2800 pixels, 20:9 ratio (453 ppi)
- Sound: Stereo speakers (closed type), No 3.5 mm jack
- Connectivity: Wi-Fi 802.11 a/b/g/n/ac/6/7, Dual-band, Wi-Fi Direct; Bluetooth 5.3 (A2DP, LE, aptX HD, aptX Adaptive, aptX Lossless); NFC; USB Type-C 2.0, OTG; GPS, GALILEO, GLONASS, QZSS, BDS (B1I+B1c)
- Data inputs: Accelerometer; Gyroscope; Fingerprint Scanner (under-display, optical); Compass; Proximity Sensor
- Made in: China
- Website: vivo.com.cn (in Chinese) iqoo.com (in English)

The iQOO Neo9 (also known as iQOO Neo9 Pro in India) is an Android-based smartphone manufactured by iQOO. Unveiled on December 27, 2023, and released on December 30, 2023.

== Specifications ==
=== Hardware ===
==== Chipset ====
The iQOO Neo9 is powered by 1x3.2 GHz Cortex-X3 & 2x2.8 GHz Cortex-A715 & 2x2.8 GHz Cortex-A710 & 3x2.0 GHz Cortex-A510 octa-core processors with Snapdragon 8 Gen 2 SoC. The SoC is based on the 4nm processing technology node. The smartphone also features an Adreno 740 GPU.

==== Storage ====
The device is available in multiple variants, offering 12 GB RAM or 16 GB RAM and 256 GB ROM, 512 GB ROM, or 1 TB ROM of UFS 4.0 storage. It does not support expandable storage via microSD.

==== Camera ====
The iQOO Neo9 features a dual-camera setup on the rear camera. The rear camera has a 50 MP wide-angle camera with an f/1.9 lens, PDAF, and OIS, and an 8 MP ultrawide camera with a 119° field of view and an f/2.2 lens. The front camera is a 16 MP wide-angle camera with an f/2.5 lens.

==== Display ====
The iQOO Neo9 is equipped with a 6.78-inch LTPO AMOLED display with a resolution of 1260x2800 pixels, providing a screen-to-body ratio of approximately 89.7%. It supports a 144 Hz refresh rate and HDR10+, with a peak brightness of 1400 nits.

==== Battery ====
The iQOO Neo9 is equipped with a 5160 mAh Li-ion battery that supports 120 W FastCharge capability, capable of charging up to 40% in 9 minutes. It also supports reverse wired charging.

== Software ==
The Chinese version of the iQOO Neo9 operates on OriginOS 4, which is based on Android 14. It is also upgradable to Origin OS 5, which is based on Android 15 The Indian Version of the iQOO Neo9 (also called iQOO Neo9 Pro) operates on Funtouch OS 14, which is based on Android 14.
