= Vivo Y01 =

Entry-level LTE smartphone

vivo Y01
- Brand: vivo
- Manufacturer: vivo
- Type: Smartphone
- Series: Y series
- First released: March 24, 2022; 4 years ago
- Availability by region: March 24, 2022: Kenya; Nigeria; South Africa; April 10, 2022: Nepal; April 22, 2022: Tanzania; April 27, 2022: Pakistan; April 30, 2022: Philippines; May 16, 2022: India
- Successor: vivo Y02
- Related: vivo Y15s
- Compatible networks: 2G, 3G, 4G LTE
- Form factor: Slate
- Colors: Elegant Black, Sapphire Blue
- Dimensions: 163.96 mm (6.455 in) H 75.2 mm (2.96 in) W 8.28 mm (0.326 in) D
- Weight: 178 g (6.3 oz)
- Operating system: Android 11 (Go edition), Funtouch OS 11.1
- System-on-chip: MediaTek Helio P35 (MT6765)
- CPU: Octa-core (4x2.35 GHz Cortex-A53 & 4x1.8 GHz Cortex-A53)
- GPU: PowerVR GE8320
- Memory: 2 GB RAM
- Storage: 32 GB eMMC 5.1
- Removable storage: microSDXC (dedicated slot)
- Battery: 5,000 mAh (non-removable)
- Charging: 10W wired
- Rear camera: 8 MP, f/2.0, AF; LED flash, 1080p@30fps video
- Front camera: 5 MP, f/2.2
- Display: 6.51 in (165 mm) IPS LCD; Resolution: 1600 x 720 pixels, 20:9 ratio (~270 ppi density)
- Sound: Loudspeaker, 3.5mm jack
- Connectivity: Wi-Fi 802.11 a/b/g/n/ac, dual-band, Bluetooth 5.0, Micro-USB 2.0, OTG
- Data inputs: Accelerometer, proximity, Compass, Ambient light sensor
- Model: V2118

The vivo Y01 is an entry-level Android-based smartphone developed by vivo. It was introduced on March 9, 2022, followed by the initial release on March 24 in Africa. The V01 was also released in the Philippines on April 30, 2022, followed by India on May 16, 2022.

== Specifications ==
=== Design ===
The design of the back is housed with a micro-pattern of vertical lines, similar to Vivo Y15s and Realme 9i. The device features a plastic build with dimensions of 163.96 × 75.2 × 8.28 mm and weighs 178 grams. It is available in two color variants: Elegant Black and Sapphire Blue.

=== Display ===
It sports a 6.51-inch LCD (IPS) "Halo FullView" display with an HD+ resolution of 1600 × 720 pixels. The screen supports capacitive multi-touch.

=== Hardware ===
The phone is powered by the MediaTek Helio P35 processor. It comes equipped with 2GB of RAM and 32GB of internal storage, which is expandable via a dedicated microSD card slot.

A primary feature of the device is its 5000mAh (typical) non-removable battery. It supports 10W standard charging via a Micro-USB port and includes USB On-The-Go (OTG) support.

=== Cameras ===
The device features a single 8MP rear camera with an f/2.0 aperture and an LED flash. Supported photography modes include Face Beauty, Time-Lapse, and standard video recording.

The device was installed with a 5MP camera with an f/2.2 aperture located in the front notch.

=== Software ===
The vivo Y01 runs on Funtouch OS 11.1 based on Android 11 (Go edition), optimized for lower-RAM devices.
