= Vivo X Flip =

2023 Vivo flip phone

vivo X Flip
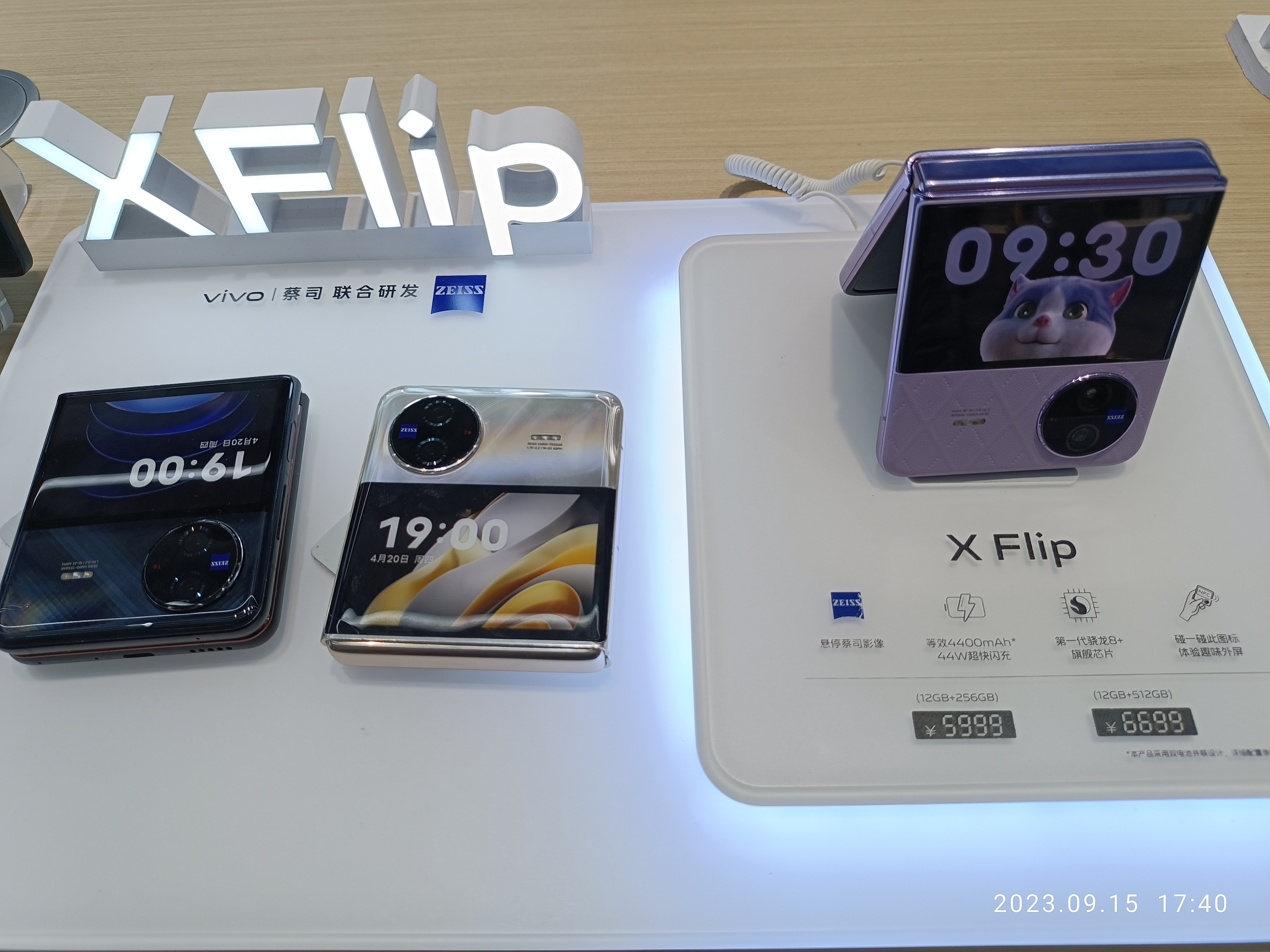
- vivo X Flip, in half-folded state (right positioned)
- Brand: vivo
- Developer: vivo (smartphone) & ZEISS (camera)
- Manufacturer: vivo
- Type: Smartphone
- Series: vivo X series
- First released: April 28, 2023
- Compatible networks: GSM, CDMA, HSPA, LTE, 5G
- Form factor: Foldable flip phone
- Colors: Diamond Black, Silk Gold, Rhombic Purple
- Dimensions: Unfolded: 166.42 × 75.25 × 7.75 mm Folded: 86.40 × 75.25 × 16.20 mm
- Weight: 198 g (7.0 oz)
- Operating system: Android 13 with OriginOS 3
- System-on-chip: Qualcomm Snapdragon 8+ Gen 1 (4 nm)
- CPU: Octa-core (1x3.0 GHz Cortex-X2 & 3x2.5 GHz Cortex-A710 & 4x1.80 GHz Cortex-A510)
- GPU: Adreno 730
- Memory: 12 GB LPDDR5 RAM
- Storage: 256 GB or 512 GB UFS 3.1
- Removable storage: No
- SIM: Dual SIM (Nano-SIM, dual stand-by)
- Battery: Non-removable Li-Po 4400 mAh
- Charging: 44W wired dual-cell flash charging
- Rear camera: Dual: 50 MP Sony IMX866V, f/1.75, 23mm (wide), 1/1.49", OIS, PDAF; 12 MP, f/2.2, 16mm, 106° (ultrawide), AF; Co-engineered by ZEISS Features: ZEISS T* lens coating, Dual-LED flash Video: 4K@30fps, 1080p@30/60fps
- Front camera: 32 MP, f/2.45 (wide); Video: 1080p@30fps
- Display: Main: 6.74 in (171 mm) Foldable LTPO AMOLED, 120Hz, HDR10+, 1080 x 2520 pixels (21:9); Cover: 3.0 in (76 mm) AMOLED, 422 x 682 pixels (14.5:9)
- Model: V2256A
- Made in: China
- Website: www.vivo.com.cn/vivo/xflip (Chinese)

The vivo X Flip is a foldable, high-end Android smartphone developed, designed, and marketed by vivo. It was announced on April 20, 2023 in China alongside X Fold 2 and Pad 2, and was released on April 28 in that year. It was the first vertical-folding manfufactured by vivo.

In terms of design and display with the unveiled image posted from Weibo, it competes against the Samsung Galaxy Z Flip 4.

== Design and display ==
Externally, the X Flip utilizes a 6.74-inch LTPO AMOLED with FHD+ resolution (1080 × 2520 pixels), a 21:9 aspect ratio, and a 406ppi pixel density. In the cover, it has a 3-inch AMOLED display with a resolution of 422 × 682 pixels and a 14.5:9 ratio.

== Specifications ==
=== Hardware and memory ===
The X Flip utilizes a high-end Qualcomm Snapdragon 8+ Gen 1 paired with an octa-core composed with one 3.0 GHz Cortex-X2 cores, three 2.5 GHz Cortex-A710 cores, and four 1.80 GHz Cortex-A510 cores and an Adreno 730 GPU. It was paired with a 12-gigabyte RAM and an internal storage of either 256GB or 512GB of UFS 3.1.

=== Camera & batteries ===
The camera design and modules were co-engineered by ZEISS. The imaging matrix features a specialized Zeiss camera array with custom T* anti-reflective optical coatings and advanced bionic spectrum processing to enhance shot accuracy.

The main rear assembly consists of a 50-megapixel VCS IMX866V primary sensor measuring 1/1.49 inches, complete with an f/1.75 aperture, a 7P lens system, and Optical Image Stabilization. This main sensor works in tandem with a secondary 12-megapixel ultra-wide-angle lens equipped with dedicated macro capabilities and auto-focus control. Selfies are handled by a 32-megapixel ultra-clear front lens embedded within the main display, while the multi-angle folding hinge facilitates secondary capture choices such as hand-held retro DV recording templates or lower-screen makeup mirror overlays using built-in soft lighting. Powering these systems is a 4.5V high-density dual-cell battery with a typical rating of 4400mAh, which accepts maximum charging inputs of up to 44W via safe fast-charging accessories.

=== Software ===
The X Flip was initially released with Android 15 with OriginOS 3 user interface.
