= Vivo Y15 =

Vivo entry-level smartphone

- Brand: Vivo
- Manufacturer: Vivo
- Type: Smartphone
- Series: Vivo Y series
- First released: May 28, 2019; 7 years ago
- Discontinued: Yes
- Compatible networks: GSM, 3G (HSDPA), 4G (LTE)
- Form factor: Slate
- Colors: Aqua Blue, Burgundy Red
- Dimensions: 159.4 mm (6.28 in) H 76.8 mm (3.02 in) W 8.9 mm (0.35 in) D
- Weight: 190.5 g (6.72 oz)
- Operating system: Android 9.0 (Pie), Funtouch OS 9
- System-on-chip: MediaTek MT6762 Helio P22 (12 nm)
- CPU: Octa-core 2.0 GHz Cortex-A53
- GPU: PowerVR GE8320
- Memory: 4 GB
- Storage: 64 GB eMMC 5.1
- Removable storage: microSDXC (dedicated slot)
- SIM: Dual SIM (Nano-SIM, dual stand-by)
- Battery: Non-removable Li-Po 5000 mAh
- Charging: Standard charging
- Rear camera: 13 MP, f/2.2, PDAF + 8 MP, f/2.2, 16 mm (ultrawide) + 2 MP auxiliary lens, f/2.4 LED flash, HDR, panorama Video: 1080p@30fps
- Front camera: 16 MP, f/2.0, 26 mm (wide), 1/3.06", 1.0 µm Video: 1080p@30fps
- Display: IPS LCD, 6.35 inches, 720 × 1544 pixels, 19.3:9 ratio (~268 ppi density)

The Vivo Y15 is an entry-level Android-based smartphone manufactured and marketed by Vivo. Announced on May 28, 2019, it is a mid-range smartphone belonging to the Vivo Y series.

== Specifications ==
=== Hardware ===
The Vivo Y15 is powered by the MediaTek MT6762 Helio P22 system-on-a-chip built on a 12 nm process, featuring an octa-core 2.0 GHz Cortex-A53 CPU and a PowerVR GE8320 GPU. The device comes with 4 GB of RAM and 64 GB of internal eMMC 5.1 storage, which can be expanded using a dedicated microSDXC slot.

The phone features a 6.35-inch IPS LCD display with a resolution of 720 × 1544 pixels (~268 ppi density) and a 19.3:9 aspect ratio. It includes a non-removable 5000 mAh battery.

=== Cameras ===
The device features a triple rear camera setup, consisting of a 13 MP main sensor with an f/2.2 aperture and phase-detection autofocus (PDAF), an 8 MP ultrawide sensor with an f/2.2 aperture (16 mm) and a 2 MP auxiliary lens with an aperture of f/2.4.

The rear camera setup supports HDR, panorama, LED flash, and video recording at 1080p@30fps.

The front-facing selfie camera features a single 16 MP sensor with an f/2.0 aperture, capable of recording 1080p video at 30fps.

=== Software ===
The Vivo Y15 launched with Android 9.0 (Pie) running Vivo's custom Funtouch OS 9 skin.
