= Vivo Y21 =

Android smartphones

vivo Y21 / Y21A
- Brand: vivo
- Manufacturer: vivo
- Type: Smartphone
- Series: Y series
- First released: August 20, 2021 (Y21); January 21, 2022 (Y21A)
- Predecessor: Vivo Y20
- Successor: Vivo Y22
- Related: Vivo Y21s, Vivo Y21e, Vivo Y21t
- Compatible networks: GSM / HSPA / LTE
- Form factor: Slate
- Colors: Midnight Blue, Diamond Glow
- Dimensions: 164.3 mm (6.47 in) H 76.1 mm (3.00 in) W 8.0 mm (0.31 in) D
- Weight: 182 g (6.4 oz)
- Operating system: Android 11 with Funtouch OS 11.1
- System-on-chip: Y21: MediaTek Helio P35 (12nm); Y21A: MediaTek Helio P22 (12nm)
- CPU: Octa-core (4x2.35 GHz Cortex-A53 & 4x1.8 GHz Cortex-A53)
- GPU: PowerVR GE8320
- Memory: 4 GB LPDDR4X
- Storage: 64 GB / 128 GB (Y21 only) eMMC 5.1
- Removable storage: microSDXC (dedicated slot)
- Battery: 5,000 mAh non-removable Li-Po
- Charging: 18W wired
- Rear camera: Dual: 13 MP, f/2.2, (wide), PDAF; 2 MP, f/2.4, (macro); LED flash, HDR, panorama, 1080p@30fps
- Front camera: 8 MP, f/2.0, (wide), 1080p@30fps
- Display: 6.51 in (165 mm) IPS LCD; 720 x 1600 pixels, 20:9 ratio (~270 ppi density)
- Sound: Loudspeaker, 3.5mm jack
- Connectivity: Wi-Fi 802.11 a/b/g/n/ac, dual-band, Wi-Fi Direct; Bluetooth 5.0, A2DP, LE; GPS, GLONASS, GALILEO, BDS
- Data inputs: Fingerprint (side-mounted), accelerometer, proximity, compass
- Model: V2111 (Y21); V2149 (Y21A)

The Vivo Y21 and Vivo Y21A are budget LTE smartphones manufactured by Vivo as part of the Y series. It was announced on August 20, 2021, while the Y21A was announced on January 22, 2022.

== Specifications ==
=== Design & display ===
Both devices feature a 6.51-inch IPS LCD display with an HD+ resolution of 720 x 1600 pixels and a waterdrop notch for the front camera. They are built with a plastic frame and back, measuring 164.3 x 76.1 x 8 mm and weighing approximately 182 grams.

=== Hardware ===
The Vivo Y21 is powered by the MediaTek Helio P35 chipset. On the other hand, the vivo Y21A utilizes the MediaTek Helio P22 processor. Both models typically come equipped with 4 GB of RAM and 64 GB or 128 GB of internal storage, which is expandable via a dedicated microSDXC slot. They run on Android 11 with vivo's Funtouch 11.1 skin.

Both devices are powered by a 5000 mAh non-removable battery that supports 18W fast charging and reverse wired charging. For security, both incorporate a side-mounted fingerprint sensor integrated into the power button.

=== Cameras ===
The camera systems are consistent across both models, featuring a rectangular camera island and a dual-rear setup consisting of a 13 MP wide primary lens and a 2 MP macro sensor. Both phones employ an 8 MP front-facing camera.

== Release ==
The Vivo Y21 was released on August 20, 2021. This includes India and Bangladesh, followed by Kenya on September 28, Pakistan on November 9, and Ukraine on November 17, 2021. The Vivo Y21A was released on January 21, 2022, in India, several weeks after the Y21e.
