= IQOO Neo10 =

Flagship gaming Android smartphone from iQOO

iQOO Neo10
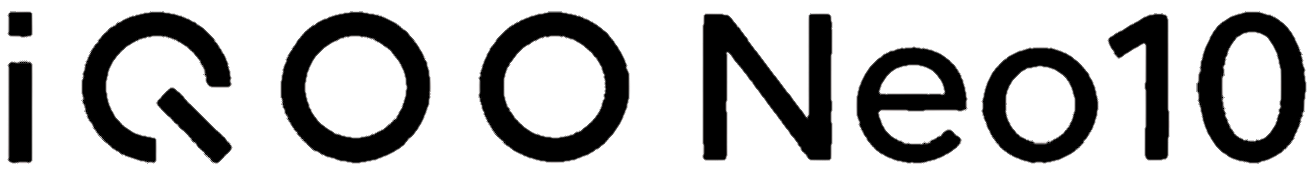
- Brand: iQOO
- Manufacturer: Vivo
- Type: Smartphone
- Series: iQOO Neo
- Family: iQOO
- First released: November 29, 2024; 22 months ago
- Predecessor: iQOO Neo9
- Successor: iQOO Neo11
- Compatible networks: GSM / HSPA / LTE / 5G
- Form factor: Slate
- Colors: Black, White, Orange
- Dimensions: 162.9 mm (6.41 in) H 75.4 mm (2.97 in) W 8 mm (0.31 in) D
- Weight: 199 g (7.0 oz) or 206 g (7.3 oz)
- Operating system: Origin OS 5 (Based on Android 15)
- System-on-chip: Qualcomm Snapdragon 8 Gen 3 (4 nm)
- CPU: Octa-core (1×3.3 GHz Cortex-X4, 3×3.2 GHz Cortex-A720, 2×3.0 GHz Cortex-A720, 2×2.3 GHz Cortex-A520)
- GPU: Adreno 750
- Memory: 12GB/16GB RAM
- Storage: 256GB/512GB/1TB (UFS 4.0, UFS 4.1 through system update)
- Removable storage: Not Supported
- SIM: Dual Nano-SIM
- Battery: 6100 mAh, Si/C Li-Ion
- Charging: 120W Flash Charge (100% in 30 min); 100W PPS+PD; Bypass charging Reverse charging
- Rear camera: Dual: 50 MP, f/1.8 (wide), 1/1.56", PDAF, OIS + 8 MP, f/2.2, 119˚ (ultrawide)
- Front camera: Single: 32 MP, f/2.5 (wide)
- Display: 6.78 in (172 mm) 1260×2800 LTPO AMOLED, 144Hz, HDR10+, 1800 nits (HBM), 4500 nits (peak) (453 ppi)
- Sound: Stereo speakers (closed type), No 3.5mm jack
- Connectivity: Wi-Fi 802.11 a/b/g/n/ac/6/7, Dual-band; Bluetooth 5.4 (A2DP, LE, aptX HD, aptX Adaptive, aptX Lossless, LHDC 5); GPS (L1+L5), GLONASS, BDS (B1I+B1c+B2a), GALILEO (E1+E5a), QZSS (L1+L5); NFC; Infrared port; USB Type-C 2.0, OTG
- Data inputs: Fingerprint (under-display, ultrasonic); Accelerometer; Gyroscope; Proximity sensor; Compass
- Model: V2425A
- Made in: China
- Website: www.vivo.com.cn/vivo/iqooneo10 (in Chinese)

The iQOO Neo10 (China) is an Android-based smartphone manufactured by iQOO, a sub-brand of Vivo. Unveiled on November 29, 2024, the device features flagship-level specifications, including a Snapdragon 8 Gen 3 chipset, a 6.78-inch LTPO AMOLED display, and 120 W fast charging.

== Specifications ==
=== Hardware ===
==== Chipset ====
The iQOO Neo10 is powered by 1×3.3 GHz Cortex-X4, 3×3.2 GHz Cortex-A720, 2×3.0 GHz Cortex-A720 & 2×2.3 GHz Cortex-A520 octa-core processors with Snapdragon 8 Gen 3 SoC. The SoC is based on the 4nm processing technology node. The smartphone also feature an Adreno 750 GPU.

==== Storage ====
The device is available in multiple variants, offering 12 GB RAM or 16 GB RAM and 256 GB ROM, 512 GB ROM, or 1 TB ROM of UFS 4.0 storage (upgradable to UFS 4.1 via software update). It does not support expandable storage via a microSD card.

==== Camera ====
The iQOO Neo10 has a dual rear camera setup on the rear camera. The rear camera has a 50 MP with an f/1.8 wide lens with PDAF and OIS and an 8 MP ultrawide sensor with an f/2.2 ultrawide lens with a 119° field of view. The front-facing camera has a 16 MP wide sensor with an f/2.5 lens.

==== Display ====
The iQOO Neo10 is equipped with an AMOLED display with a 6.78-inch 1260×2800 resolution and HDR10+ support.

==== Battery ====
The iQOO Neo10 is equipped with a 6100 mAh Silicon-Carbon Li-ion battery. This battery is featured with 120W FastCharge capability. The device can charge to 100% in 30 minutes using 120W FastCharge capability. It also supports 100W PPS and PD charging, bypass charging, and reverse charging.

== Software ==
The iQOO Neo10 operates on Origin OS 5 which is based on Android 15.
