= Vivo Y19 =

LTE smartphone

vivo Y19
- Brand: vivo
- Manufacturer: vivo
- Series: Y series
- First released: November 1, 2019
- Availability by region: November 2019
- Form factor: Slate
- Colors: Magnetic Black, Spring White
- Dimensions: 162.2 mm × 76.5 mm × 8.9 mm (6.39 in × 3.01 in × 0.35 in)
- Weight: 193 g (6.8 oz)
- Operating system: Android 9.0 "Pie", Funtouch OS 9.2
- System-on-chip: MediaTek Helio P65 (MT6768)
- CPU: Octa-core (2x2.0 GHz Cortex-A75 & 6x1.7 GHz Cortex-A55)
- GPU: Mali-G52 MC2
- Memory: 4 GB, 6 GB, or 8 GB LPDDR4X
- Storage: 128 GB eMMC 5.1
- Removable storage: microSDXC (dedicated slot)
- Battery: 5,000 mAh Li-Po (non-removable)
- Charging: 18W fast charging, 5W reverse charging
- Rear camera: Triple: 16 MP, f/1.8, (wide), PDAF; 8 MP, f/2.2, 13mm (ultrawide); 2 MP, f/2.4, (macro); Features: LED flash, HDR, panorama Video: 1080p@30fps
- Front camera: 16 MP, f/2.0, 26mm (wide), 1/3.06", 1.0µm Features: HDR; Video: 1080p@30fps
- Display: 6.53-inch IPS LCD; 1080 x 2340 pixels, 19.5:9 ratio (~395 ppi density)
- Sound: Loudspeaker, 3.5mm jack
- Connectivity: Wi-Fi 802.11 a/b/g/n/ac, dual-band, Wi-Fi Direct, hotspot Bluetooth 5.0, A2DP, LE; GPS with A-GPS, GLONASS, GALILEO, BDS; FM radio Micro-USB 2.0, USB OTG
- Data inputs: Fingerprint (rear-mounted), accelerometer, proximity, compass

The Vivo Y19 is an entry-level Android smartphone introduced on November 1, 2019, as part of the Y series lineup. It was released on November 23, 2019, in the Philippines.

Aside from performance, the Y19 has access to Multi-Turbo and Game Space performance enhancement for gaming.

== Specifications ==
The device is powered by a MediaTek Helio P65 (MT6768) chipset, built on a 12 nm process, and includes an octa-core CPU (2x2.0 GHz Cortex-A75 & 6x1.7 GHz Cortex-A55) paired with a Mali-G52 MC2 GPU. It was launched with 4GB or 6GB of RAM and 128GB of internal storage, which is expandable via a dedicated microSDXC slot.

The Y19 is equipped with a triple-camera system on the rear, consisting of a 16 MP main sensor with an f/1.8 aperture, an 8 MP ultrawide lens, and a 2 MP macro sensor. The front-facing camera, housed in a waterdrop notch, is a 16 MP sensor with an f/2.0 aperture.

The smartphone has its 5,000 mAh non-removable battery, which supports 18W fast charging and 5W reverse wired charging. It runs on Android 9.0 (Pie) with vivo's Funtouch 9.2 skin. It also received Android 12 beta software update in August 2022.

Other notable features include a rear-mounted fingerprint sensor, Bluetooth 5.0, and a microUSB 2.0 port.
