= Vivo X50 =

Android-based smartphones produced by Vivo

Vivo X50 Vivo X50 Pro (Vivo X51) Vivo X50 Pro+

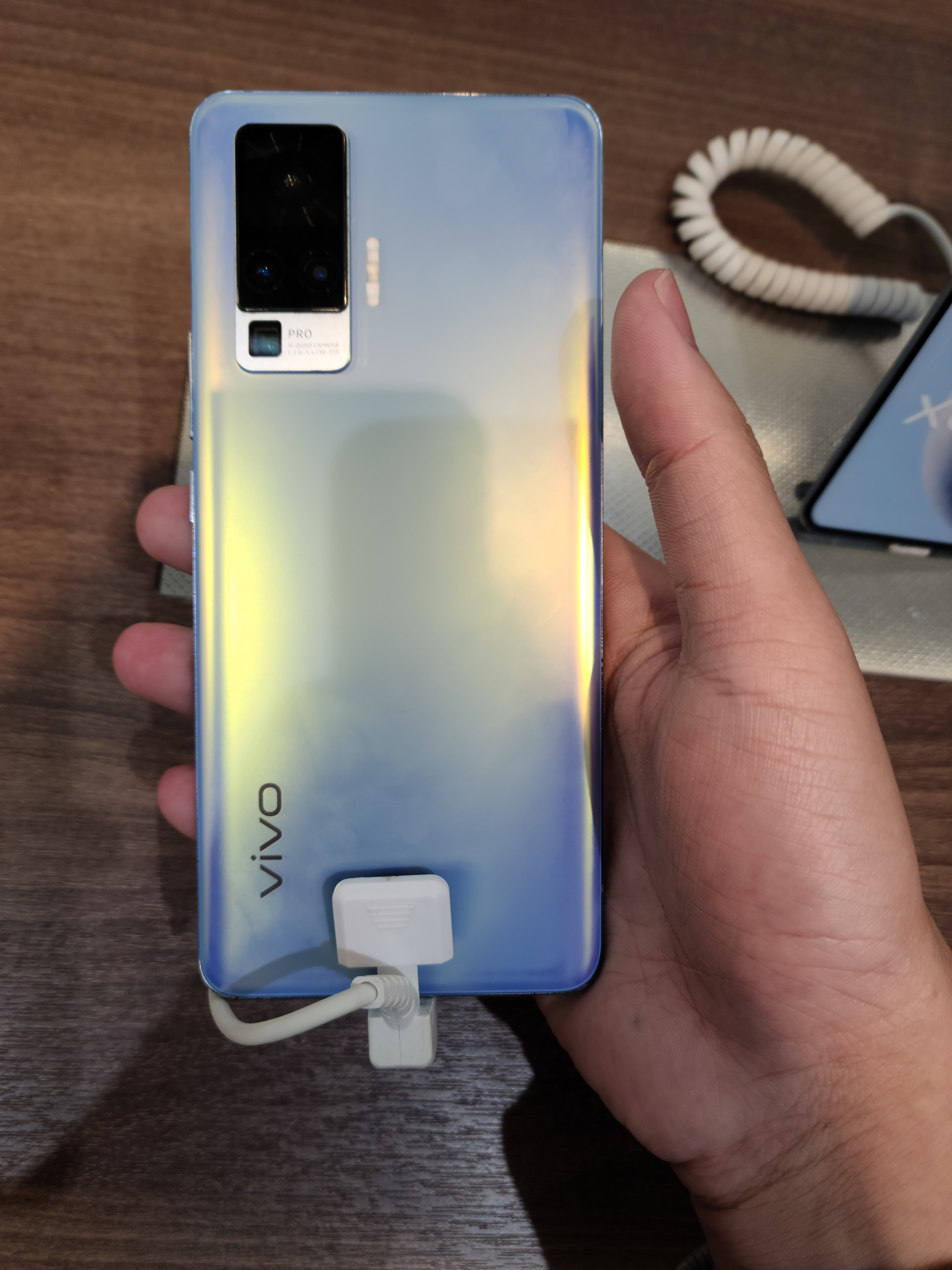
- Vivo X50 Pro
- Brand: Vivo
- Manufacturer: Vivo
- Type: Phablet
- Series: X
- First released: X50 5G: 6 June 2020; 6 years ago; X50 Pro: 12 June 2020; 6 years ago; X50 Pro+: 11 July 2020; 6 years ago; X50 4G: 16 July 2020; 6 years ago; X51: 23 October 2020; 5 years ago
- Predecessor: Vivo X30
- Successor: Vivo X60
- Compatible networks: 2G, 3G, 4G and 5G
- Form factor: Slate
- Dimensions: X50: 159.5 mm × 75.4 mm × 7.5 mm (6.28 in × 2.97 in × 0.30 in); X50 Pro/X50 Pro+: 158.5 mm × 72.8 mm × 8 mm (6.24 in × 2.87 in × 0.31 in)
- Weight: X50: 173–174.5 g (6.10–6.16 oz); X50 Pro/X50 Pro+: 182 g (6.4 oz)
- Operating system: Funtouch OS (based on Android 10)
- System-on-chip: X50 4G: Qualcomm Snapdragon 730; X50 5G/X50 Pro: Qualcomm Snapdragon 765G; X50 Pro+: Qualcomm Snapdragon 865
- CPU: Octa-core: X50 4G: (2x2.2 GHz Kryo 470 Gold & 6x1.8 GHz Kryo 470 Silver); X50 5G/X50 Pro: (1x2.4 GHz Kryo 475 Prime & 1x2.2 GHz Kryo 475 Gold & 6x1.8 GHz Kryo 475 Silver); X50 Pro+: (1x2.84 GHz Kryo 585 & 3x2.42 GHz Kryo 585 & 4x1.8 GHz Kryo 585)
- GPU: X50 4G: Adreno 618; X50 5G/X50 Pro: Adreno 620; X50 Pro+: Adreno 650
- Memory: X50/X50 Pro: 8 GB LPDDR4X RAM; X50 Pro+: 8 or 12 GB LPDDR5 RAM
- Storage: 128 GB or 256 GB: X50/X50 Pro: UFS 2.1; X50 Pro+: UFS 3.0
- Battery: X50: 4200 mAh; X50 Pro/X50 Pro+: 4315 mAh
- Rear camera: X50: 48 MP, f/1.6 (wide) + 8 MP, f/2.2, 16 mm, 1/4", 1.12 μm (ultrawide) + 13 MP, f/2.5, 50 mm, 1/2.8", 0.8 μm (portrait) + 5 MP, f/2.5 (macro), 2x optical zoom, PDAF, OIS; X50 Pro: 48 MP, f/1.6 (wide) + 8 MP, f/2.2, 16 mm, 1/4", 1.12 μm (ultrawide) + 13 MP, f/2.5, 50 mm, 1/2.8", 0.8 μm (portrait) + 8 MP, f/3.4, 135 mm, 1/4" (telephoto), 5x optical zoom, PDAF, gimbal OIS; X50 Pro+: 50 MP, f/1.9, 1/1.31", 1.2 μm (wide) + 8 MP, f/2.2, 16 mm, 1/4", 1.12 μm (ultrawide) + 13 MP, f/2.5, 50 mm, 1/2.8", 0.8 μm (portrait) + 8 MP, f/3.0, 135 mm, 1/4" (telephoto), 5x optical zoom, Dual Pixel PDAF, OIS; All: Gyro-EIS, dual-LED flash, Auto HDR, 4K@30 fps, 1080p@30 fps
- Front camera: 32 MP, f/2.5, 26mm, 1/2.8", 0.8 μm 1080p@30 fps, HDR
- Display: AMOLED capacitive touchscreen with HDR10+ support 6.56 in (167 mm) 2376 × 1080 1080p (2.5 MP), (398 ppi with 19.8:9 aspect ratio), 16M colors: X50/X50 Pro: 90 Hz refresh rate; X50 Pro+: 120 Hz refresh rate
- Sound: Mono speaker
- Connectivity: Bluetooth 5.1; Wi-Fi a/b/g/n/ac; A2DP, LE, aptX HD
- Data inputs: Fingerprint scanner (optical); Accelerometer; gyroscope; proximity sensor; electronic compass
- Website: www.vivo.com/en/products/x50/

Vivo X50 is a line of Android-based smartphones developed and manufactured by Vivo, announced on 1 June 2020.

== Specifications ==
=== Design ===
The X50 series is constructed using an anodized aluminum frame but NO Gorilla Glass on the front. The back panel is glass on the X50 and X50 Pro, while the X50 Pro+ uses glass or artificial leather. The display is flat on the X50 and curved on the X50 Pro and X50 Pro+, and has a circular cutout for the front-facing camera. On the back, the rear camera module contains a rectangular array, and protrudes slightly. The cameras are housed next to the LED flash on the X50 Pro+; the X50 and X50 Pro have a separate flash positioned to the right. Color options consist of Black, Blue and Pink finishes for the X50, Dark Blue and Light Blue for the X50 Pro, and Blue (glass) and Brown (leather) for the X50 Pro+.

=== Hardware ===
The X50 4G uses the Snapdragon 730 and Adreno 618 GPU, the X50 5G and X50 Pro use the Snapdragon 765G with the Adreno 620 GPU, and the X50 Pro+ uses the Snapdragon 865 and Adreno 650. Storage is non-expandable with either 128 or 256 GB; the X50 and X50 Pro have UFS 2.1 and the X50 Pro+ has UFS 3.0. The X50 and X50 Pro have 8 GB of LPDDR4X RAM, while the X50 Pro+ has 8 or 12 GB of LPDDR5 RAM. The display is a 6.56-inch (167mm) 1080p AMOLED panel with a 19.8:9 aspect ratio and HDR10+ support. The refresh rate is 90 Hz on the X50 and X50 Pro, and 120 Hz on the X50 Pro+. The X50's battery capacity is 4200 mAh, while the X50 Pro and X50 Pro+ are 4315 mAh. Wired fast charging is supported over USB-C at 33W for the X50 and X50 Pro, and 44W for the X50 Pro+. Biometric options include an optical (under-screen) fingerprint sensor and facial recognition.

==== Camera ====
The X50's camera setup consists of a 48 MP wide sensor, an 8 MP ultrawide sensor, a 13 MP portrait sensor and a 5 MP macro sensor. The X50 Pro's is similar to the X50's, but the macro sensor is replaced with a telephoto sensor. The X50 Pro is largely the same as the X50 Pro with the exception of a larger 50 MP wide sensor. The portrait sensor on the Pro phones is a conventional lens with 2x optical zoom, whereas the telephoto sensor is a "periscope" lens with 5x optical zoom. The wide camera has the Sony IMX598 sensor on the X50 and X50 Pro and the Samsung ISOCELL GN1 sensor on the X50 Pro+. Additionally, the X50 Pro has a more advanced mini-stabilizer compared to the standard OIS system used in the X50 and X50 Pro+. The front camera uses a 32 MP sensor on all three X50 phones.

=== Software ===
The X50 series runs on Funtouch OS 10.5, which is based on Android 10. It was the first phone sold in Europe to update to Android 11.
