= Vivo X60 =

Android-based smartphones produced by Vivo

Vivo X60 Vivo X60 Pro Vivo X60 Pro+ Vivo X60t Pro+
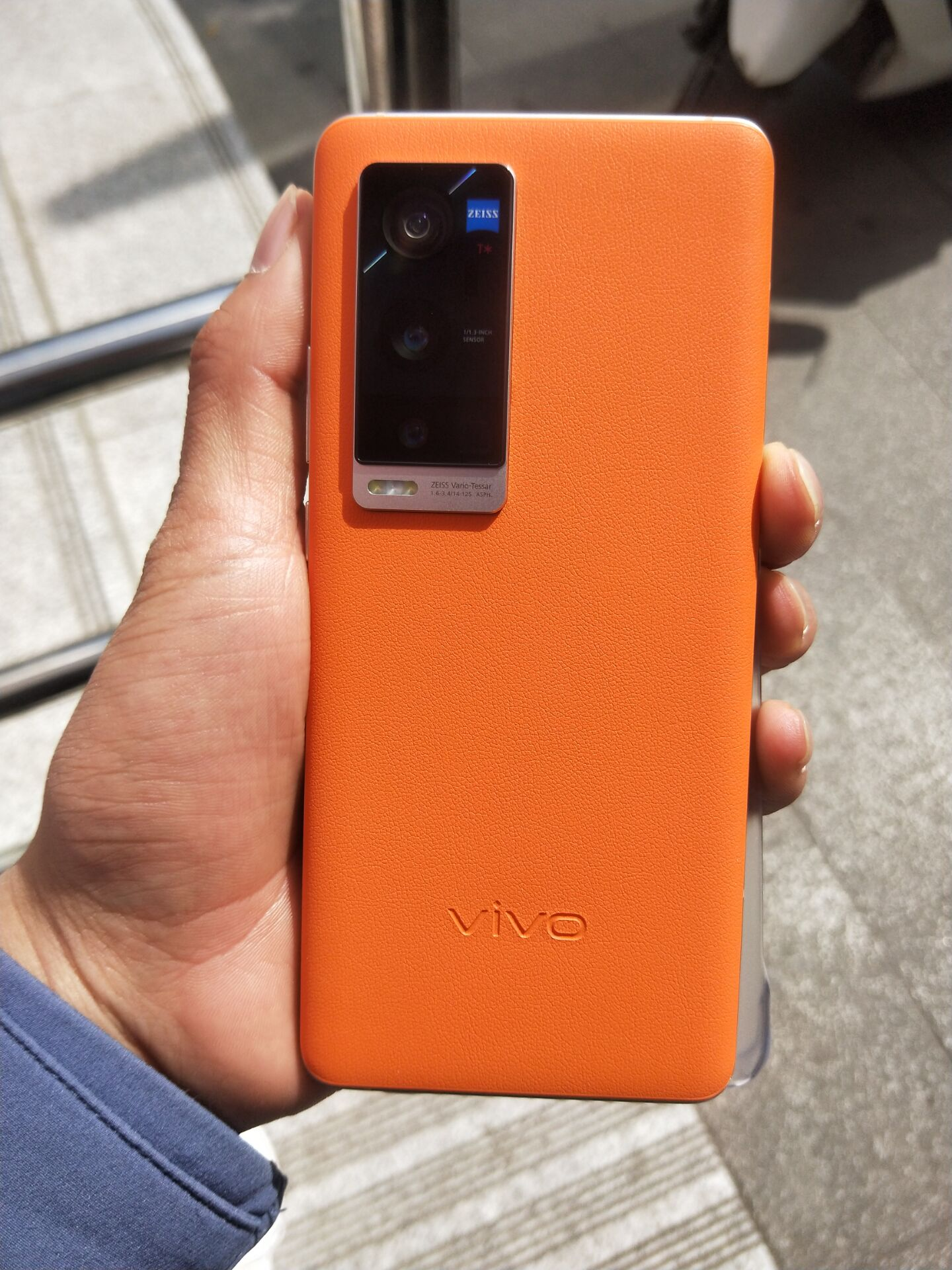
- Vivo X60 Pro+
- Brand: Vivo
- Manufacturer: Vivo
- Type: Phablet
- First released: X60 and X60 Pro: 8 January 2021; 5 years ago; X60 Pro+: 30 January 2021; 5 years ago X60t Pro+:28 June 2021; 5 years ago
- Predecessor: Vivo X50
- Successor: Vivo X70
- Compatible networks: 2G, 3G, 4G and 5G
- Form factor: Slate
- Dimensions: X60: 159.6 mm × 75 mm × 7.4 mm (6.28 in × 2.95 in × 0.29 in); X60 Pro: 158.6 mm × 73.2 mm × 7.6 mm (6.24 in × 2.88 in × 0.30 in); X60 Pro+: 158.6 mm × 73.4 mm × 9.1 mm (6.24 in × 2.89 in × 0.36 in)
- Weight: X60: 175.6 g (6.19 oz); X60 Pro: 178 g (6.3 oz); X60 Pro+: 190.6 g (6.72 oz)
- Operating system: Origin OS 1.0 (China); Funtouch OS 11.1 (International) (based on Android 11)
- System-on-chip: X60 and X60 Pro: Samsung Exynos 1080 (China) Qualcomm Snapdragon 870 (International); X60 Pro+: Qualcomm Snapdragon 888
- CPU: Octa-core, X60 and X60 Pro: (1x 2.8 GHz Cortex-A78 + 3x 2.6 GHz Cortex-A78 + 4x 2.0 GHz Cortex-A55) (China) (1x 3.2 GHz + 3x 2.42 GHz + 4x 1.8 GHz Kryo 585) (International); X60 Pro+: (1x 2.84 GHz + 3x 2.42 GHz + 4x 1.8 GHz Kryo 680)
- GPU: X60 and X60 Pro: Mali-G78 MP10 (China) Adreno 650 (International); X60 Pro+: Adreno 660
- Memory: 8 GB or 12 GB LPDDR5 RAM
- Storage: 128 GB or 256 GB UFS 3.1
- Removable storage: None
- Battery: X60: 4300 mAh; X60 Pro and X60 Pro+: 4200 mAh
- Rear camera: X60: 48 MP, f/1.8, 26mm, 1/2", 0.8 μm (wide) + 13 MP, f/2.2, 16mm (ultrawide) + 13 MP, f/2.5, 50 mm, 1/2.8", 0.8 μm (portrait), 2x optical zoom; X60 Pro: 48 MP, f/1.5, 26mm, 1/2", 0.8 μm (wide) + 13 MP, f/2.2, 16mm (ultrawide) + 13 MP, f/2.5, 50 mm, 1/2.8", 0.8 μm (portrait) + 8 MP, f/3.4, 125mm, 1/4" (telephoto), 2x and 5x optical zoom (Note: International X60 Pro does not have 5x telephoto lens.); X60 Pro+: 50 MP, f/1.6, 1/1.31", 1.2 μm (wide) + 48 MP, 1/2", 0.8 μm (ultrawide) + 32 MP, f/2.1, 50 mm, 1/2.8", 0.8 μm (telephoto) + 8 MP, f/3.4, 125mm, 1/4" (telephoto), 2x and 5x optical zoom Zeiss optics X60 and X60 Pro: PDAF, OIS, gyro-EIS X60 Pro+: Dual Pixel PDAF, Laser AF, gimbal OIS, gyro-EIS X60 and X60 Pro: 4K@30/60 fps, 1080p@30/60 fps (Note: 60 fps is only on the international variants.) X60 Pro+: 8K@30 fps, 4K@30/60 fps, 1080p@30/60 fps
- Front camera: 32 MP, f/2.5, 26mm, 1/2.8", 0.8 μm, HDR; X60 and X60 Pro: 1080p@30 fps, X60 Pro+: 4K@30 fps, 1080p@30 fps
- Display: AMOLED capacitive touchscreen with HDR10+ support 6.56 in (167 mm) 2376 × 1080 1080p (2.5 MP), (398 ppi with 19.8:9 aspect ratio), 120 Hz refresh rate
- Sound: Mono speaker
- Connectivity: Bluetooth 5.1/5.2; Wi-Fi a/b/g/n/ac/6; A2DP, LE, aptX HD
- Data inputs: Fingerprint scanner (optical); Accelerometer; gyroscope; proximity sensor; electronic compass

Vivo X60 is a line of Android-based smartphones developed and manufactured by Vivo, it featured the Zeiss co-engineered imaging system. It was released on January 8, 2021, for the X60 & X60 Pro, January 30, 2021 for the X60 Pro+, and the X60t Pro+ on June 28, 2021.

The Vivo X60 and X60 Pro featured the Samsung Exynos 1080 chipset, whereas the X60 Pro+ is powered by the Qualcomm Snapdragon 888. All three models feature a centered punch-hole display.

== Design ==
The X60 series largely inherits the design of the Vivo X50 series, including the front-facing center punch-hole display and the rear "dual-tone cloud-step" camera design. All models except the X60 feature a "3D curved display", while the X60 uses a non-curved display.

== Camera ==
=== Rear Camera ===
The Vivo X60 series features an imaging system jointly developed with Zeiss.

The main highlight of this series is its "micro-gimbal" main camera design. Vivo officially refers to the micro-gimbal system on the X60 series as the "second-generation micro-gimbal" to distinguish it from the "micro-gimbal" technology first introduced with the previous X50 series. This technology helps improve the stability of both photos and videos taken with the main camera. Except for the X60 Pro+, the main cameras on the phones in this series are 48-megapixel. The X60 Pro also includes an 8-megapixel periscope telephoto lens with 5x optical zoom support.

The X60 Pro+ features a "dual main camera" design, comprising a 50-megapixel Samsung GN1 main sensor and a 48-megapixel Sony IMX598 main sensor. The former's main advantage is its large aperture, while the latter incorporates the series' signature "micro-gimbal" technology. It also comes with the same periscope telephoto lens as the X60 Pro. The rear camera module of the X60 Pro+ meets the Zeiss T* coating standard, which Zeiss officially states can increase visible light transmission and reduce reflectivity, thereby decreasing the frequency of ghosting when shooting in strong light.

=== Front Camera ===
All models in the X60 series are equipped with a 32-megapixel front-facing camera.

== Performance and Experience ==
The X60 and X60 Pro are equipped with the Samsung Exynos 1080 SoC, which is manufactured using Samsung's 5nm process technology. It features an 8-core CPU based on ARM Cortex-A78 and ARM Cortex-A55, and a 10-core Mali-G78 GPU. The X60 Pro+, on the other hand, is equipped with the Snapdragon 888 SoC.

The X60 series features a 6.56-inch AMOLED screen with a resolution of 2376x1080, supporting a 120Hz refresh rate and a 240Hz touch sampling rate. It also supports under-display optical fingerprint recognition. The X60 Pro+ uses a linear motor, while the other two models use rotor motors.

Regarding battery life and charging, the X60 has a 4300mAh battery, while the Pro and Pro+ models have 4200mAh batteries. All models support 33W charging, except for the X60 Pro+, which supports 55W charging.

== Software ==
The X60 series was the first to feature Vivo's Origin OS 1.0, which is the successor to Funtouch OS. This system introduced new concepts such as behavioral wallpapers and the "Huarong Road" design.
