= Vivo Y91C =

vivo Y91C (vivo Y91C 2020) (vivo Y91i in India)
- Also known as: vivo Y91i (India)
- Brand: vivo
- Manufacturer: vivo
- Series: Y series
- First released: March 2019
- Availability by region: March 2019
- Compatible networks: GSM, HSPA, LTE
- Colors: Fusion Black, Ocean Blue, Sunset Red
- Dimensions: 155.1 mm × 75.1 mm × 8.3 mm (6.11 in × 2.96 in × 0.33 in)
- Weight: 163.5 g (5.77 oz)
- Operating system: Android 8.1 (Oreo), Funtouch OS 4.5
- System-on-chip: MediaTek MT6762 Helio P22 (12 nm)
- CPU: Octa-core 2.0 GHz Cortex-A53
- GPU: PowerVR GE8320
- Memory: 2 GB or 3 GB RAM
- Storage: 16 GB or 32 GB eMMC 5.1
- Removable storage: microSDXC (dedicated slot)
- Battery: 4030 mAh non-removable Li-Po
- Rear camera: 13 MP, f/2.2, PDAF; LED flash, HDR, panorama
- Front camera: 5 MP, f/1.8 (or 8 MP depending on market)
- Display: 720 x 1520 pixels, 19:9 ratio (~270 ppi density)
- Connectivity: Wi-Fi 802.11 b/g/n, Wi-Fi Direct, hotspot Bluetooth 5.0, A2DP, LE; GPS with A-GPS, GLONASS, BDS microUSB 2.0, USB OTG
- Data inputs: Accelerometer, proximity, compass
- Model: 1820_19

The vivo Y91C is an entry-level smartphone developed & manufactured by Vivo and was known as the vivo V91i in India. Both smartphones are served as part of the Y Series.

== Release ==
The Y91C was released on February 7, 2020, and was exclusive in Bangladesh coming with Fusion Black and Ocean Blue colors as well in South Africa, which is to be the first budget smartphone. In earlier releases like the Philippines, it was released in March 2019 with price drops for June, September, and December, respectively.

Release of the smartphone takes place in early March in India, which is sold under the name vivo Y91i.

== Specifications ==
=== Hardware ===
==== Display ====
The vivo Y91C and Y91i feature a 6.22-inch IPS LCD "Halo FullView" display with an HD+ resolution of 720 x 1520 pixels and a 19:9 aspect ratio. The screen includes a waterdrop notch for the front camera and a 2.5D curved glass design.

==== Processor ====
The device is powered by the MediaTek Helio P22 (MT6762) octa-core processor, built on a 12 nm process, with a clock speed of 2.0 GHz. It is paired with an IMG PowerVR GE8320 GPU. The phone comes with 2 GB of RAM and is available in two storage configurations: 16 GB and 32 GB, both expandable via a dedicated microSD card slot up to 256 GB.

==== Battery ====
It packs a 4,030 mAh non-removable Li-Po battery. The Y91i and Y91C lacks a physical fingerprint sensor, relying instead on Face Access (face unlock) for biometric security.

=== Cameras ===
The phone is equipped with a single 13-megapixel rear camera with an f/2.2 aperture and LED flash. On the front, it features a 5-megapixel (some variants reported as 8-megapixel) camera with an f/1.8 aperture for selfies. The camera software includes features such as Face Beauty and professional mode.

=== Software ===
The Y91i launched with Android 8.1 (Oreo) running vivo's custom Funtouch OS 4.5 interface.
