= Vivo Y31d =

Entry-level Android smartphone

vivo Y31d
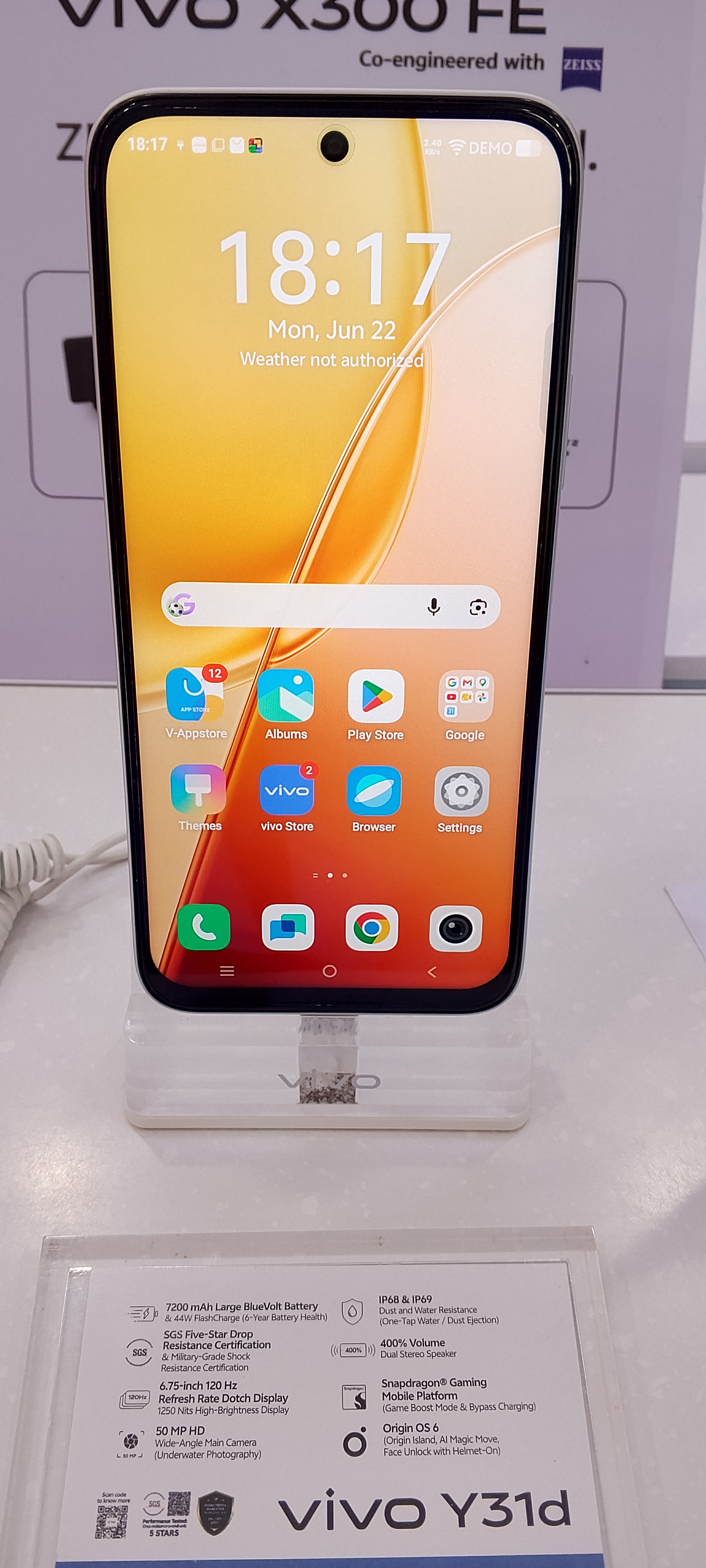
- Front panel in Glow White colorway
- Brand: vivo
- Manufacturer: Vivo
- Type: Smartphone
- First released: January 28, 2026
- Availability by region: Bangladesh: March 1, 2026; Pakistan: March 30, 2026; Philippines: May 9, 2026
- Compatible networks: GSM / HSPA / LTE (4G only)
- Form factor: Slate
- Colors: Glow White, Starlight Grey
- Dimensions: 166.6×78.4×8.4 mm (6.56×3.09×0.33 in)
- Weight: 219 g (7.7 oz)
- Operating system: Android 16 with OriginOS 6
- System-on-chip: Qualcomm Snapdragon 6s 4G Gen 2
- CPU: Octa-core (4x2.9 GHz Cortex-A73 & 4x1.9 GHz Cortex-A53)
- GPU: Adreno (unspecified)
- Memory: 6 GB or 8 GB LPDDR4X
- Storage: 128 GB or 256 GB UFS 2.2
- Removable storage: None
- Battery: 7,200 mAh Si/C Li-Ion (non-removable)
- Charging: 44W wired
- Rear camera: 50 MP, f/2.0, 21mm (wide), PDAF; Auxiliary lens LED flash, HDR, panorama Video: 1080p@30fps
- Front camera: 8 MP, f/2.1 (wide); Video: 1080p@30fps
- Display: 6.75 in (171 mm) IPS LCD, 120Hz; 720 × 1570 pixels (~256 ppi density), 19.5:9 ratio
- Sound: Stereo speakers, no 3.5mm jack
- Connectivity: Wi-Fi 802.11 a/b/g/n/ac, dual-band Bluetooth 5.1 (A2DP, LE); GPS, GALILEO, GLONASS, BDS, QZSS; Infrared port USB Type-C 2.0, OTG
- Model: V2543
- Development status: Available
- Website: https://www.vivo.com/ph/products/y31d

The vivo Y31d is an entry-level Android smartphone manufactured, deleloped, and designed by vivo, featuring an IP68/IP69/IP69+ water / dust resistance, a 120 Hz refresh rate, and a dual camera setup. It was released on January 28, 2026 for Cambodia and Vietnam, followed by Bangladesh on March 1, then in Pakistan on March 30, and in the Philippines on May 9 in that year.

Vivo committed to maintaining operating system smoothness for up to five years, alongside extended security updates for the Y31d.

== Design and build ==
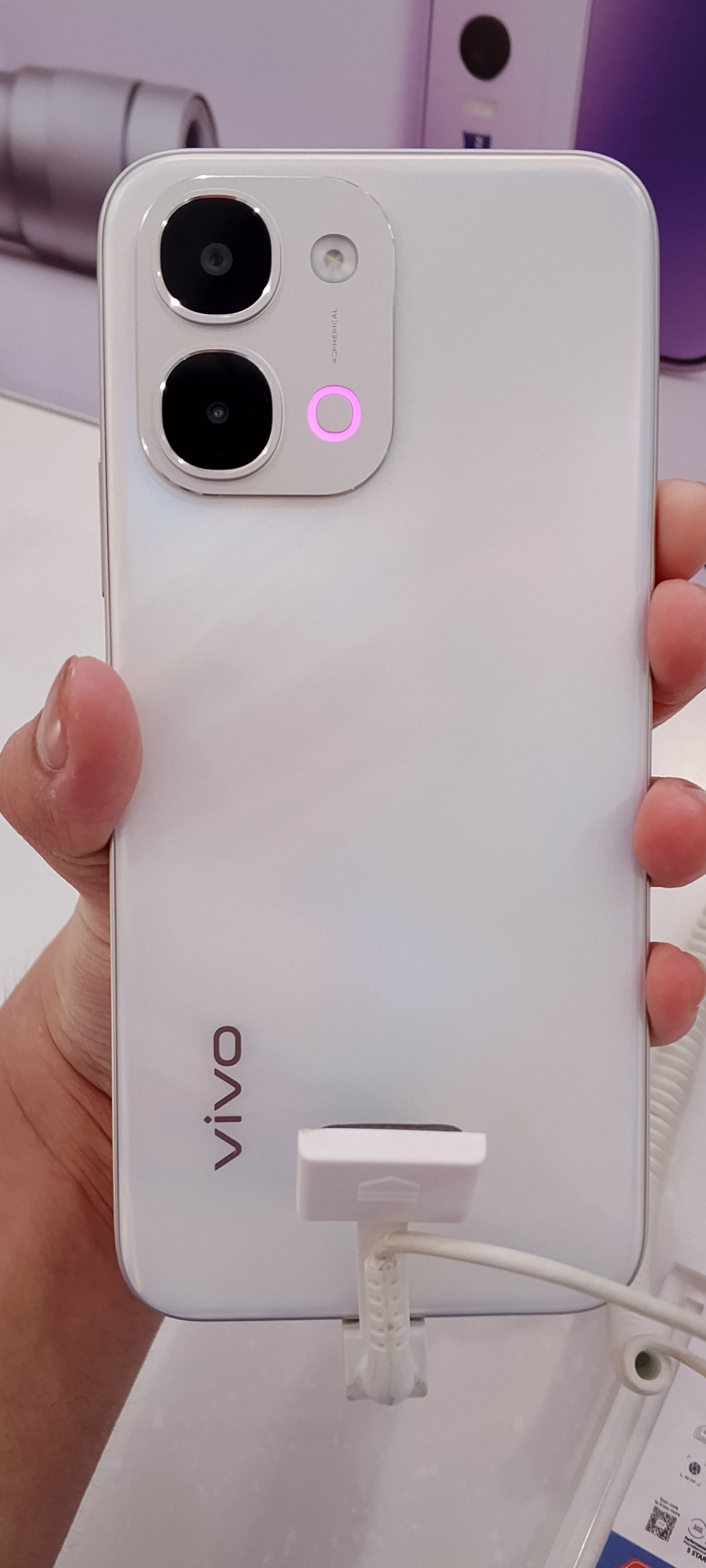
Rear panel

The vivo Y31d features a modern build combining a glass front panel with a plastic frame and a plastic back cover. It measures 166.6 mm in height, 78.4 mm in width, and has a thickness of 8.4 mm, while weighing approximately 219 grams. Notably, the chassis carries an advanced IP68, IP69 and in IP69+ rating, ensuring it is completely dust-tight and highly resistant to both high-pressure water jets and immersion in water up to 1.5 meters for 30 minutes. The device is offered in two color options, designated as Glow White and Starlight Grey.

== Technical specifications ==
=== Display & performance ===
The smartphone is equipped with a 6.75-inch IPS LCD display that features a fluid 120Hz refresh rate and a peak high brightness mode of 1250 nits. The screen has a native resolution of 720 × 1570 pixels in a 19.5:9 aspect ratio, yielding a pixel density of roughly 256 ppi and achieving an 85.3% screen-to-body ratio. Under the hood, the phone is powered by a Qualcomm Snapdragon 6s 4G Gen 2 chipset, which utilizes an octa-core CPU configuration consisting of four performance Cortex-A73 cores clocked at 2.9 GHz and four efficiency Cortex-A53 cores clocked at 1.9 GHz alongside an unspecified Adreno GPU.

=== Memory ===
For memory and internal storage, the device implements fast UFS 2.2 architecture and is available in configurations of either 128 GB or 256 GB of storage paired with 6 GB or 8 GB of RAM; however, it lacks a dedicated microSD card slot for expandable storage.

=== Cameras & battery ===
The camera array on the rear includes a dual system headlined by a 50 MP wide-angle lens with an f/2.0 aperture and Phase Detection Autofocus, supported by an auxiliary lens and an LED flash capable of shooting 1080p video at 30 frames per second. On the front, it has a single 8 MP wide camera with an f/2.1 aperture. One of the device's standout hardware characteristics is its massive 7200 mAh silicon-carbon battery, which supports 44W wired fast charging capable of reaching a 50% charge in 43 minutes, as well as reverse wired charging and a specialized bypass charging mode.

=== Software ===
Out of the box, it operates on the Android 16 platform customized with vivo's proprietary OriginOS 6 user interface, integrated with Origin Island and vivo DocMaster.
