= Vivo X70 =

Android-based smartphones produced by Vivo

Vivo X70 Vivo X70 Pro Vivo X70 Pro+
- Brand: Vivo
- Manufacturer: Vivo
- Type: Phablet
- First released: X70 Pro+: 9 September 2021; 4 years ago X70/Pro: 13 September 2021; 4 years ago
- Predecessor: Vivo X60
- Successor: Vivo X80
- Compatible networks: 2G, 3G, 4G and 5G
- Form factor: Slate
- Dimensions: X70: 160.5 mm × 75.4 mm × 7.6 mm (6.32 in × 2.97 in × 0.30 in); X70 Pro: 158.3 mm × 73.2 mm × 8.0 mm (6.23 in × 2.88 in × 0.31 in); X70 Pro+: 164.5 mm × 75.2 mm × 8.9 mm (6.48 in × 2.96 in × 0.35 in)
- Weight: X70: 181 g (6.4 oz); X70 Pro: 183 g (6.5 oz); X70 Pro+: 209 g (7.4 oz)
- Operating system: Funtouch OS 12 (based on Android 11)
- System-on-chip: X70 and X70 Pro: MediaTek Dimensity 1200-Vivo; X70 Pro+: Qualcomm Snapdragon 888+
- CPU: Octa-core, X70 and X70 Pro: (1x 3.0 GHz Cortex-A78 + 3x 2.6 GHz Cortex-A78 + 4x 2.0 GHz Cortex-A55); X70 Pro+: (1x 3.0 GHz + 3x 2.42 GHz + 4x 1.8 GHz Kryo 680)
- GPU: X70 and X70 Pro: Mali-G77 MC9 (China); X70 Pro+: Adreno 660
- Memory: 8 GB or 12 GB LPDDR5 RAM
- Storage: 128 GB or 256 GB UFS 3.1
- Removable storage: None
- Battery: X70: 4400 mAh; X70 Pro: 4450 mAh; X70 Pro+: 4500 mAh
- Rear camera: X70: 40 MP, f/1.8, 26mm, 1/2", 0.8 μm (wide) + 12 MP, f/2.2, 16mm (ultrawide) + 13 MP, f/2.5, 12 mm, 1/2.8", 0.8 μm (telephoto), 2x optical zoom; X70 Pro: 50 MP, f/1.5, 26mm, 1/2", 0.8 μm (wide) + 12 MP, f/2.2, 16mm (ultrawide) + 12 MP, f/2.5, 50 mm, 1/2.8", 0.8 μm (periscope telephoto) + 8 MP, f/3.4, 125mm, 1/4" (telephoto), 2x and 5x optical zoom; X70 Pro+: 50 MP, f/1.6, 1/1.31", 1.2 μm (wide) + 48 MP, 1/2", 0.8 μm (ultrawide) + 12 MP, f/2.1, 50 mm, 1/2.8", 0.8 μm (telephoto) + 8 MP, f/3.4, 125mm, 1/4" (periscope telephoto), 2x and 5x optical zoom Zeiss optics X70 and X70 Pro: PDAF, Laser AF, Gimbal OIS, gyro-EIS X70 Pro+: Dual Pixel PDAF, Laser AF, gimbal OIS, gyro-EIS X70 and X70 Pro: 4K@30/60 fps, 1080p@30/60 fps (Note: 60 fps is only on the international variants) X70 Pro+: 8K@30 fps, 4K@30/60 fps, 1080p@30/60 fps
- Front camera: 32 MP, f/2.5, 26mm, 1/2.8", 0.8 μm, HDR; X70 and X70 Pro: 1080p@30 fps, X70 Pro+: 4K@30 fps, 1080p@30 fps
- Display: X70/X70 Pro: AMOLED capacitive touchscreen with HDR10+ support 6.56 in (167 mm) 2376 × 1080 1080p, (398 ppi with 20:9 aspect ratio), 120 Hz refresh rate X70 Pro+: AMOLED capacitive touchscreen with HDR10+ support 6.78 in (172 mm) 3200 × 1440 1440p, (517 ppi with 20:9 aspect ratio), 120 Hz refresh rate
- Sound: Vivo X70/Pro: Mono speaker X70 Pro+: Stereo speaker
- Connectivity: Bluetooth 5.1/5.2; Wi-Fi a/b/g/n/ac/6; A2DP, LE, aptX HD
- Data inputs: Fingerprint scanner (optical); Accelerometer; gyroscope; proximity sensor; electronic compass

Vivo X70 is a line of Android-based smartphones developed and manufactured by Vivo, it features the Zeiss co-engineered imaging system.
