= Vivo Y1s =

2020 Vivo budget LTE smartphone

vivo Y1s
- Brand: vivo
- Manufacturer: vivo
- Series: Y series
- First released: November 26, 2020
- Availability by region: List: India; Nepal; Pakistan; Philippines
- Predecessor: Vivo Y91c
- Compatible networks: GSM / HSPA / LTE
- Colors: Aurora Blue, Olive Black
- Dimensions: 155.1 mm × 75.1 mm × 8.3 mm (6.11 in × 2.96 in × 0.33 in)
- Weight: 161 g (5.7 oz)
- Operating system: Android 10, Funtouch OS 10.5
- System-on-chip: MediaTek MT6765 Helio P35 (12nm)
- CPU: Octa-core (4x2.35 GHz Cortex-A53 & 4x1.8 GHz Cortex-A53)
- GPU: PowerVR GE8320
- Memory: 2 GB or 3 GB RAM
- Storage: 32 GB eMMC 5.1
- Removable storage: microSDXC (dedicated slot)
- Battery: Li-Ion 4030 mAh, non-removable
- Rear camera: 13 MP, f/2.2, PDAF; LED flash, HDR, panorama 1080p@30fps
- Front camera: 5 MP, f/1.8
- Display: 6.22 inches, IPS LCD, 720 x 1520 pixels, 19:9 ratio (~270 ppi density)
- Connectivity: Wi-Fi 802.11 b/g/n, Wi-Fi Direct; Bluetooth 5.0, A2DP, LE; GPS (with A-GPS, GLONASS, GALILEO, BDS); MicroUSB 2.0, USB On-The-Go
- Data inputs: Accelerometer, proximity, compass

The Vivo Y1s is an entry-level Android smartphone manufactured by Vivo, announced and released on November 26, 2020, as part of the Y series.

It was available in the Philippines in early April 2021, exclusively in Bicol and Mindanao territories, followed by India on June 15 with the 3GB variant, which follows the 2GB variant on November 26. It also features a single camera at the rear side.

== Technical specifications ==
=== Design and display ===
The vivo Y1s features a plastic body with dimensions of 155.1 x 75.1 x 8.3 mm and a weight of 161 grams. It is equipped with a 6.22-inch IPS LCD panel that offers a resolution of 720 x 1520 pixels (HD+) at a 19:9 aspect ratio and a pixel density of approximately 270 ppi. The display includes a waterdrop notch for the front camera, contributing to a claimed screen-to-body ratio of roughly 82.9%.

=== Hardware ===
The device is powered by the MediaTek MT6765 Helio P35 chipset, built on a 12 nm process. This octa-core processor consists of four 2.35 GHz Cortex-A53 cores and four 1.8 GHz Cortex-A53 cores, paired with a PowerVR GE8320 GPU. In terms of memory, the phone typically comes with 2GB or 3GB of RAM and 32GB of eMMC 5.1 internal storage, which can be expanded via a dedicated microSDXC slot.

=== Cameras and battery ===
The vivo Y1s utilizes a single 13 MP rear camera with an f/2.2 aperture, supported by an LED flash below and capable of recording 1080p video at 30fps. The front-facing "selfie" camera is a 5 MP sensor with an f/1.8 aperture.

The device is equipped by a non-removable 4,030 mAh Li-Ion battery, with standard 10W charging via a microUSB 2.0 port.

=== Software ===
The smartphone was launched running Funtouch OS 10.5, with the pre-installed Android 10 mobile operating system.
