= Vivo X80 =

Android based smartphones produced by Vivo

Vivo X80 Vivo X80 Pro
- Brand: Vivo
- Manufacturer: Vivo
- Type: Phablet
- First released: 25 April 2022; 4 years ago
- Predecessor: Vivo X70
- Successor: Vivo X90
- Related: Vivo X Note
- Compatible networks: 2G, 3G, 4G and 5G
- Form factor: Slate
- Dimensions: X80: 165 mm × 75.2 mm × 8.3 mm (6.50 in × 2.96 in × 0.33 in); X80 Pro: 164.6 mm × 75.3 mm × 9.1 mm (6.48 in × 2.96 in × 0.36 in)
- Weight: X80: 203 g (7.2 oz) or 206 g (7.3 oz); X80 Pro: 216 g (7.6 oz) or 219 g (7.7 oz)
- Operating system: Origin OS Ocean (based on Android 12)
- System-on-chip: X80: MediaTek Dimensity 9000; X80 Pro: Qualcomm Snapdragon 8 Gen 1 or MediaTek Dimensity 9000
- CPU: Octa-core, X80: (1x 2.8 GHz Cortex-A78 + 3x 2.6 GHz Cortex-A78 + 4x 2.0 GHz Cortex-A55); X80 Pro: (1x 3.0 GHz + 3x 2.42 GHz + 4x 1.7 GHz Cortex-A510) or (1x 2.8 GHz Cortex-A78 + 3x 2.6 GHz Cortex-A78 + 4x 2.0 GHz Cortex-A55)
- GPU: X80: Mali-G78 MP10; X80 Pro: Adreno 730 or Mali-G78 MP10
- Memory: 8 GB or 12 GB LPDDR5 RAM
- Storage: X80: 128 GB, 256 GB or 512 GB UFS 3.1; X80 Pro: 256 GB or 512 GB UFS 3.1
- Removable storage: None
- Battery: X80: 4500 mAh; X80 Pro: 4700 mAh
- Rear camera: X80: 50 MP, f/1.8, 26mm, 1/2", 0.8 μm (wide) + 12 MP, f/2.2, 16mm (ultrawide) + 13 MP, f/2.5, 12 mm, 1/2.8", 0.8 μm (telephoto), 2x optical zoom; X80 Pro: 50 MP, f/1.5, 26mm, 1/2", 0.8 μm (wide) + 48 MP, f/2.2, 16mm (ultrawide) + 12 MP, f/2.5, 50 mm, 1/2.8", 0.8 μm (periscope telephoto) + 8 MP, f/3.4, 125mm, 1/4" (telephoto), 2x and 5x optical zoom Both: PDAF, Laser AF, Gimbal OIS, gyro-EIS X80: 4K@30/60 fps, 1080p@30/60 fps X80 Pro: 8K@30 fps, 4K@30/60 fps, 1080p@30/60 fps
- Front camera: 32 MP, f/2.5, 26mm, 1/2.8", 0.8 μm, HDR; X80: 1080p@30 fps, X80 Pro: 4K@30 fps, 1080p@30 fps
- Display: X80: AMOLED capacitive touchscreen with HDR10+ support 6.78 in (172 mm) 2400 × 1080 1080p, (388 ppi with 20:9 aspect ratio), 120 Hz refresh rate X80 Pro: AMOLED capacitive touchscreen with HDR10+ support 6.78 in (172 mm) 3200 × 1440 1440p, (518 ppi with 20:9 aspect ratio), 120 Hz refresh rate
- Sound: Mono speaker, Hi-Fi audio
- Connectivity: Bluetooth 5.1/5.2; Wi-Fi a/b/g/n/ac/6; A2DP, LE, aptX HD
- Data inputs: Fingerprint scanner (optical); Accelerometer; gyroscope; proximity sensor; electronic compass

Vivo X80 is a line of Android-based smartphones developed and manufactured by Vivo. It features a Zeiss co-engineered imaging system.
