= Vivo Y50t =

LTE smartphone

vivo Y50t
- Brand: vivo
- Manufacturer: Vivo
- Series: Y series
- First released: November 16, 2021
- Availability by region: November 2021
- Compatible networks: GSM, CDMA, HSPA, EVDO, LTE
- Colors: Black, Blue
- Dimensions: 162 x 76.6 x 8.5 mm (6.38 x 3.02 x 0.33 in)
- Weight: 190 g (6.70 oz)
- Operating system: Android 10 with OriginOS 1.0
- System-on-chip: Qualcomm Snapdragon 720G (8 nm)
- CPU: Octa-core (2x2.3 GHz Kryo 465 Gold & 6x1.8 GHz Kryo 465 Silver)
- GPU: Adreno 618
- Memory: 8 GB RAM
- Storage: 128 GB
- Removable storage: microSDXC (dedicated slot)
- Battery: 4,500 mAh Li-Po (non-removable)
- Charging: 18W wired
- Rear camera: Triple: 48 MP, f/1.8, 25mm (wide), PDAF; 2 MP, f/2.4 (macro); 2 MP, f/2.4 (depth); Features: LED flash, HDR, panorama Video: 4K@30fps, 1080p@30/60fps; gyro-EIS
- Front camera: 8 MP, f/2.0 (wide); Features: HDR; Video: 1080p@30fps
- Display: 6.53-inch IPS LCD; 1080 x 2340 pixels, 19.5:9 ratio (~395 ppi density)
- Sound: Loudspeaker, 3.5mm jack
- Connectivity: Wi-Fi 802.11 a/b/g/n/ac, dual-band, Wi-Fi Direct; Bluetooth 5.1, A2DP, LE, aptX HD; GPS (with A-GPS, GLONASS, BDS, GALILEO); Micro-USB 2.0, OTG
- Data inputs: Fingerprint scanner (side-mounted), accelerometer, gyroscope, proximity sensor, compass
- Model: V2154A

The Vivo Y50t is a mid-range LTE smartphone developed and manufactured by Vivo as part of the "Y" lineup series. It was announced and launched on November 16, 2021. It features an 18-watt fast charging support, a microSD slot, and a Full HD+ resolution with a punch hole on the left.

== Specifications ==
=== Body and display ===
The device features a 6.53-inch IPS LCD panel with a Full HD+ resolution of 1080 x 2340 pixels and a pixel density of approximately 395 ppi. It measures 162 x 76.6 x 8.5 mm and weighs 190 grams. The display utilizes a punch-hole design for the front camera, achieving a screen-to-body ratio of roughly 84.4%.

=== Platform and memory ===
The vivo Y50t is powered by the Qualcomm SM7125 Snapdragon 720G chipset, built on an 8 nm process. This octa-core processor consists of two 2.3 GHz Kryo 465 Gold cores and six 1.8 GHz Kryo 465 Silver cores, paired with an Adreno 618 GPU. It launched running Android 10 with vivo's OriginOS skin. In terms of memory, the device comes with 8 GB of RAM and 128 GB of internal UFS 2.1 storage, which is expandable via a dedicated microSDXC slot.

=== Cameras ===
The rear of the phone houses a triple-camera setup, featuring a 48 MP wide-angle primary sensor with an f/1.8 aperture and Phase Detection Auto Focus (PDAF). This is supported by a 2 MP macro lens and a 2 MP depth sensor, both with f/2.4 apertures. The rear camera system is capable of recording 4K video at 30 fps and 1080p video at up to 60 fps with gyro-EIS. For selfies, there is an 8 MP wide-angle front-facing camera with an f/2.0 aperture that supports 1080p video recording.

=== Battery and connectivity ===
The smartphone is equipped with a non-removable 4500 mAh Li-Po battery that supports 18W wired fast charging. Connectivity options include dual-band Wi-Fi 802.11 a/b/g/n/ac, Bluetooth 5.1, and 4G LTE support. Notably, the device retains a 3.5mm headphone jack and utilizes a microUSB 2.0 port with OTG support. Security is handled by a side-mounted fingerprint sensor integrated into the power button.
