= Vivo Y20g =

2021 entry-level smartphones by Vivo

vivo Y20g vivo Y20s [G]
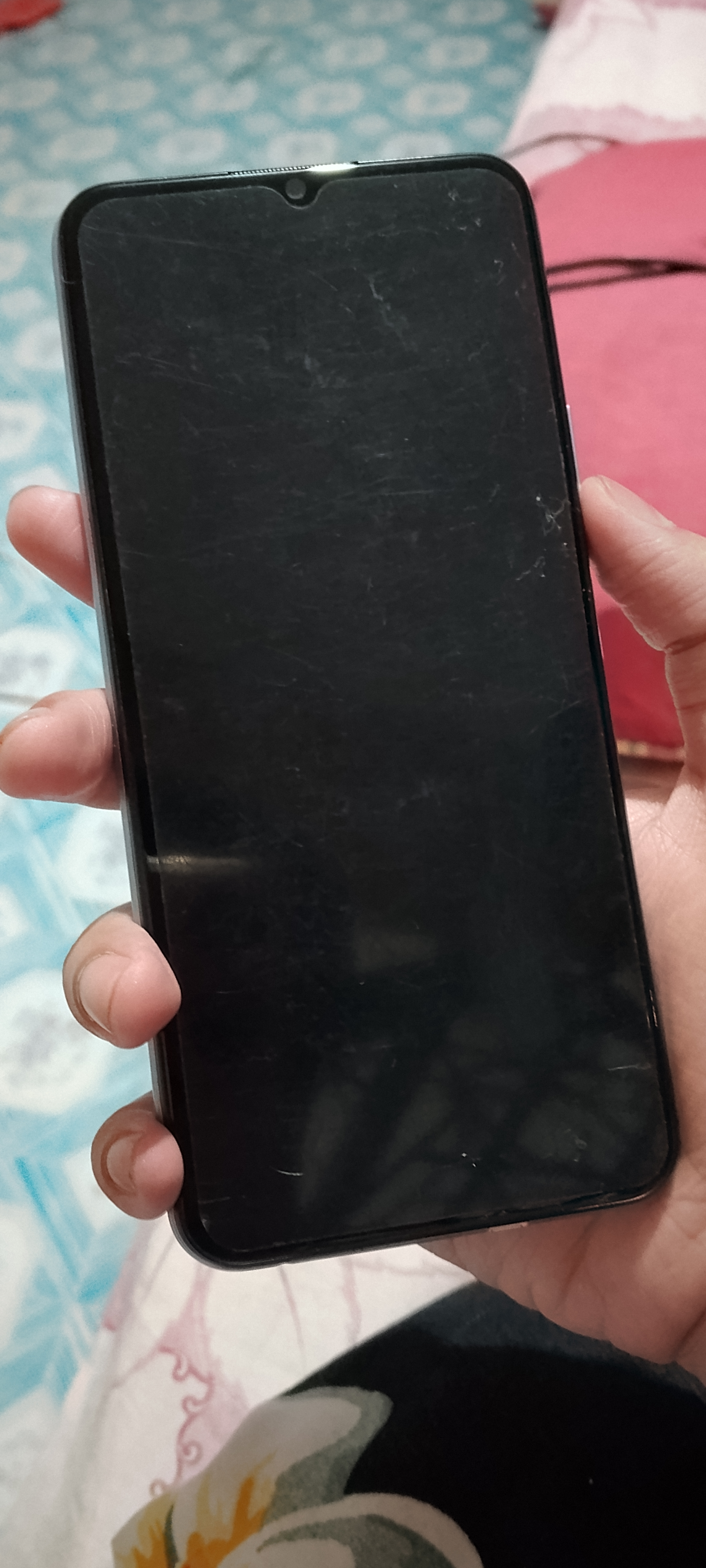
- Vivo Y20g
- Brand: vivo
- Manufacturer: vivo
- Type: Smartphone
- Series: Y series
- First released: January 19, 2021 (Y20G); April 10, 2021 (Y20s [G])
- Related: Vivo Y20
- Form factor: Slate
- Colors: Obsidian Black, Purist Blue
- Dimensions: 164.4 mm × 76.3 mm × 8.4 mm (6.47 in × 3.00 in × 0.33 in)
- Weight: 192.3 g (6.78 oz)
- Operating system: Android 10 or 11, Funtouch OS 11
- CPU: MediaTek Helio G80 (12 nm); Octa-core (2x2.0 GHz Cortex-A75 & 6x1.8 GHz Cortex-A55)
- GPU: Mali-G52 MC2
- Memory: 4 GB or 6 GB LPDDR4X
- Storage: 64 GB or 128 GB eMMC 5.1
- Removable storage: microSDXC (dedicated slot, up to 1 TB)
- Battery: 5000 mAh non-removable Li-Po
- Charging: 18W wired
- Rear camera: Triple: 13 MP, f/2.2, (wide), PDAF; 2 MP, f/2.4, (macro); 2 MP, f/2.4, (depth); LED flash, HDR; 1080p@30fps
- Front camera: 8 MP, f/1.8, (wide); 1080p@30fps
- Display: 6.51 in (165 mm) IPS LCD; 1600 × 720 pixels (20:9 aspect ratio), 270 ppi
- Sound: Loudspeaker, 3.5 mm jack
- Connectivity: Wi-Fi 802.11 a/b/g/n/ac, dual-band, Wi-Fi Direct; Bluetooth 5.0, A2DP, LE; GPS (with A-GPS, GLONASS, GALILEO, BDS); Micro-USB 2.0, OTG
- Data inputs: Fingerprint scanner (side-mounted), accelerometer, proximity sensor, compass
- Model: V2037 and V2065 (Y20g); V2038 (Y20s [G])
- Website: https://www.vivo.com/ph/products/y20sg

The Vivo Y20g and Vivo Y20s [G] are entry-level Android-based smartphones manufactured my Vivo. Aside from the Y series lineup, it was announced on January 19, 2021, for the Y20g, while the Y20s [G] was announced on April 10, 2021. Both models support LTE connectivity along with the standard Y20 and Y20s models. The Vivo Y20s G was released in the Philippines as a rebranded version of the Vivo Y20g.

== Technical specifications ==
=== Design and display ===
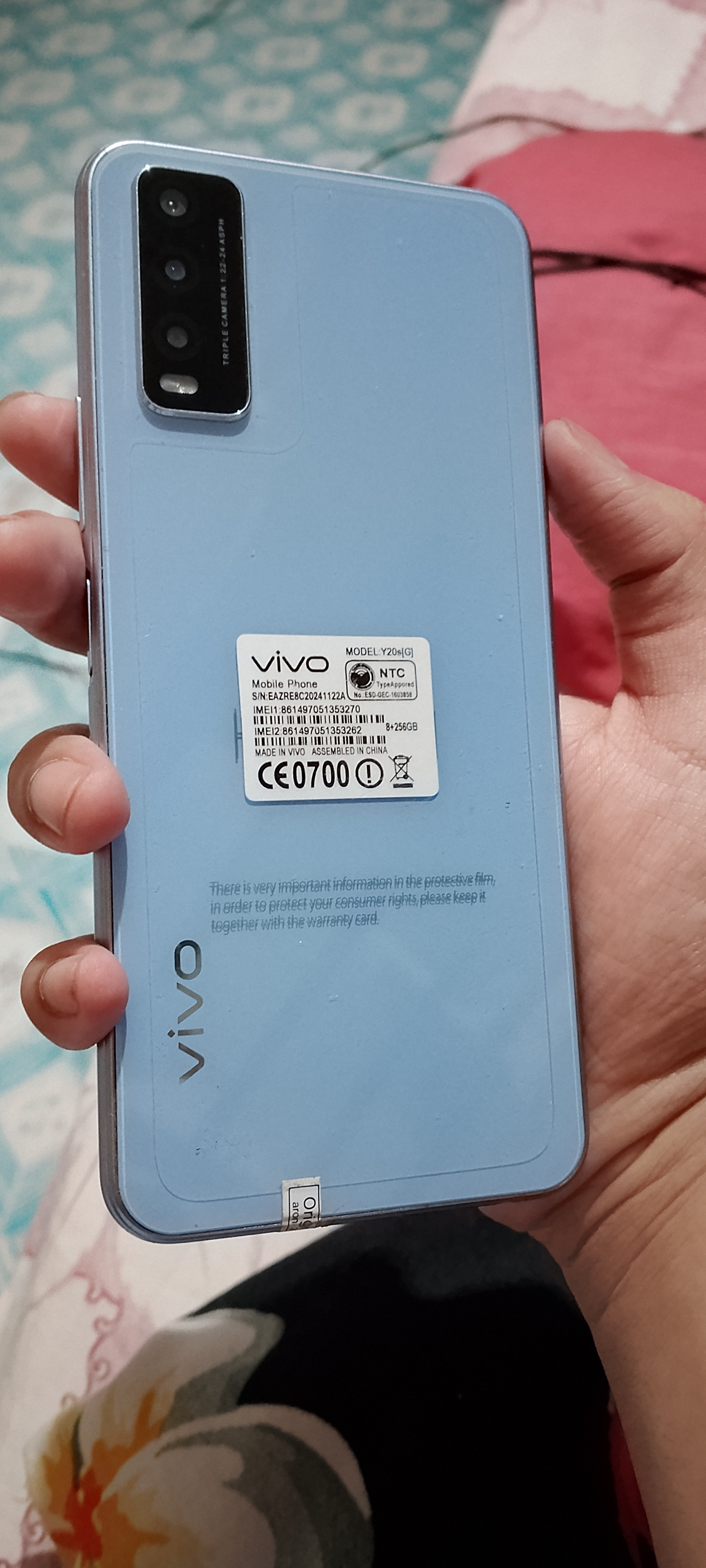
Rear side of the vivo Y20s [G]

The devices feature a 6.51-inch IPS LCD "Halo FullView" display with an HD+ resolution of 1600 x 720 pixels, 60 Hz refresh rate, and a 20:9 aspect ratio. The body is constructed with a glass front and a plastic back and frame, weighing approximately 192.3 grams and measuring 164.4 x 76.3 x 8.4 mm. For biometric security, both models utilize a side-mounted fingerprint scanner integrated into the power button, which is advertised to unlock the device in approximately 0.17 seconds.

=== Hardware ===
At the core of both smartphones is the MediaTek Helio G80 chipset, built on a 12 nm process. This octa-core processor consists of two 2.0 GHz Cortex-A75 cores and six 1.8 GHz Cortex-A55 cores, paired with a Mali-G52 MC2 GPU for graphics. They typically come equipped with 6GB of RAM and 128GB of internal eMMC 5.1 storage, which can be expanded up to 1TB via a dedicated microSDXC slot.

=== Cameras ===
==== Main ====
The rear camera setup consists of an AI triple-camera array, featuring a 13 MP primary wide-angle lens with an f/2.2 aperture and Phase Detection Auto Focus (PDAF). It was also supported by a 2 MP macro lens and a 2 MP depth sensor with the same aperture with f/2.4.

==== Front ====
On the front, it has an 8 MP wide-angle camera with an aperture of f/1.8 is housed within a waterdrop-style notch. Both the front and rear cameras support video recording at 1080p at 30fps.

=== Battery and software ===
Both phones are powered by a 5,000 mAh non-removable Li-Po battery with a18W fast charging support with a microUSB 2.0 port. While the Y20G was initially released running Funtouch 11 based on Android 10, the Y20s [G] generally shipped with Android 11. Both devices include essential sensors such as an accelerometer, proximity sensor, and compass.
