= Vivo Y29 =

Android entry-level smartphone manufactued by Vivo

vivo Y29 4G
- Brand: vivo
- Manufacturer: vivo
- Type: Smartphone
- Series: Y series
- First released: February 24, 2025
- Related: Vivo Y29 5G
- Compatible networks: GSM, HSPA, LTE (4G)
- Form factor: Slate
- Colors: Noble Brown, Elegant White
- Dimensions: 165.7 mm × 76.3 mm × 8.2 mm (6.52 in × 3.00 in × 0.32 in)
- Weight: 204 to 208 g (7.2 to 7.3 oz)
- Operating system: Android 15, upgradable to Android 16 with Funtouch 16; Current: Android 16 with OriginOS 6
- System-on-chip: Qualcomm SM6225 Snapdragon 685 (6 nm)
- CPU: Octa-core (4x2.8 GHz Cortex-A73 & 4x1.9 GHz Cortex-A53)
- GPU: Adreno 610
- Memory: 6 GB or 8 GB RAM
- Storage: 128 GB or 256 GB eMMC 5.1
- Removable storage: microSDXC (uses shared SIM slot)
- Battery: Li-Ion 6500 mAh (non-removable)
- Charging: 44W wired (50% in 41 min, 100% in 92 min), reverse wired
- Rear camera: Dual: 50 MP, f/1.8, (wide), PDAF + auxiliary lens 2 MP depth sensor, f/2.4, panorama Video: 1080p@30fps
- Front camera: 8 MP, f/2.0, (wide); Video: 1080p@30fps
- Display: IPS LCD, 120Hz, 1000 nits (HBM); 6.68 inches (~84.9% screen-to-body ratio); 720 x 1608 pixels, 20:9 ratio (~264 ppi density)
- Sound: Stereo speakers, 24-bit/192kHz Hi-Res audio (no 3.5mm jack)
- Connectivity: Wi-Fi 802.11 a/b/g/n/ac, dual-band Bluetooth 5.0, A2DP, LE; GPS, GLONASS, GALILEO, BDS, QZSS; NFC (market/region dependent); Infrared port USB Type-C 2.0, OTG
- Data inputs: Capacitive touchscreen, multi-touch, fingerprint sensor (side-mounted), accelerometer, proximity, compass
- Water resistance: IP64 dust tight and water resistant
- Model: V2434
- Other: MIL-STD-810H compliant + SCHOTT drop resistance with 64% increase, LED ring "Dynamic Light"

The Vivo Y29 4G is an entry-level Android smartphone manufactured, designed, and marketed by vivo. It was released on February 24, 2025 with a customizable Dynamilc Light for notifications and IP64 dust and splash resistance. It was released on May 31, 2025 for the Philippine market.

== Specifications ==
=== Design ===
The back and the frames were made of plastic; and in the front, it was made of glass.

It was engineered by an IP resistance rating of 64 and can maintain smooth performance up to 50 months. The manufacturer claimed that the Y29 4G can withstand up to 8 hours of rain and in underwater up to 100 seconds. Externally, at the front, it was housed by a 6.68-inch IPS LCD display with a refresh rate of 120Hz, a 720 x 1608-pixel resolution, a 20:9 ratio, and a maximum brightness up to 1000 nits. It was also equipped by a Schott screen protector with drop resistance increase to 64%. With dimensions at 165.7mm of height × 76.3mm of width × 8.2mm of thickness, the phone weights from 204-208 grams depending on the color.

The Vivo Y29 4G comes in two official colors: Noble Brown and Elegant White.

A distinctive feature at the back and below the camera setup is the Dynamic Light and comes in multiple colors: cyan, purple, red, green, blue, and purple.

=== Hardware and cameras ===
The Vivo Y29 is powered by a Qualcomm Snapdragon 685 chipset under its octa-cote processor composed of four Cortex-A73 cores clocking at 2.8GHz and four Cortex-A53 cores clocking at 1.9GHz. It also has an Adreno 610 GPU and a 6500 mAh non-removable lithium-ion battery with fast-charging Flash Charge support up to 44 watts.

For the storage, it either has a capacity of 126 or 256 gigabytes of internal storage with eMMC 5.1, and a RAM of either 6 or 8 gigabytes.

The rear camera comes in 2 lenses: a 50-megapixel main HD camera and a 2-megapixel bokeh/depth sensor. In the front it received an 8-megapixel camera. Both main and front camera record up to 1080p at 30fps. A distinctive feature in the main rear camera is the dual-view video for capturing both rear and front views.

=== Software ===
The vivo Y29 4G run on the pre-installed Android 15 mobile operating system with FunTouch OS 15 UI. It was updated to Android 16 with FunTouch OS 16 UI. It also comes with Circle to Search and AI features for editing photos, with OriginOS 6 update in October 2025 that was launched globally.
