= Vivo Y89 =

2019 smartphone model

- Brand: Vivo
- Manufacturer: Vivo Communication Technology Co. Ltd.
- Type: Smartphone
- Series: Vivo Y series
- First released: January 2019
- Availability by region: China and select Asian markets
- Predecessor: Vivo Y83
- Form factor: Slate
- Colors: Aurora Purple, Black Gold
- Dimensions: 154.8×75.0×7.9 mm (6.09×2.95×0.31 in)
- Weight: 149 g (5 oz)
- Operating system: Android 8.1 Oreo
- System-on-chip: Qualcomm Snapdragon 626
- CPU: Octa-core (8×2.2 GHz Cortex-A53)
- GPU: Adreno 506
- Memory: 4 GB RAM
- Storage: 64 GB
- Removable storage: microSD, up to 256 GB
- SIM: Dual SIM (Nano-SIM, dual stand-by)
- Battery: 3260 mAh (non-removable Li-Po)
- Charging: 10W wired
- Rear camera: Dual: 16 MP (wide) + 2 MP (depth)
- Front camera: 16 MP
- Display: 6.26 in (159 mm) IPS LCD
- Sound: Loudspeaker, 3.5 mm headphone jack
- Connectivity: 4G LTE, Wi-Fi 802.11 b/g/n, Bluetooth 4.2, GPS, micro-USB 2.0

The Vivo Y89 is an Android smartphone developed and manufactured by Vivo, a Chinese consumer electronics company. The device was announced in January 2019 as part of Vivo's Y-series lineup, which targets the mid-range smartphone segment. The Y89 features a large display with a notched design, dual rear cameras, and a high-capacity battery.

== Specifications ==
=== Design and build ===
The Vivo Y89 features a plastic body with a glossy gradient finish. The device includes a rear-mounted fingerprint sensor for biometric authentication and capacitive navigation controls. It was released in color variants including Aurora Purple and Black.

=== Display ===
The smartphone is equipped with a 6.26-inch IPS LCD display with a resolution of 2280 × 1080 pixels and a 19:9 aspect ratio. The display includes a notch housing the front camera and sensors.

=== Hardware ===
The Vivo Y89 is powered by the Qualcomm Snapdragon 626 octa-core processor paired with 4 GB of RAM. It includes 64 GB of internal storage, expandable via microSD card.

=== Software ===
The Vivo Y89 runs Funtouch OS 4.0, Vivo's Android-based user interface, built on Android 8.1 Oreo.

The software includes system optimization tools, gesture navigation options, and Vivo's Jovi smart assistant, along with AI-assisted features such as game optimization modes and camera enhancements.
