= Vivo Y400 =

2025 Android smartphone by Vivo

Vivo Y400 5G
- Developer: Vivo
- Manufacturer: Vivi
- Type: Smartphone
- Series: Vivo Y Series
- First released: August 4, 2025; 11 months ago
- Compatible networks: 5G, 4G/LTE, 3G, GSM
- Colors: Glam White, Olive Green
- Dimensions: 6.67-inch full-HD+ AMOLED, 120Hz refresh rate
- Operating system: Android 15 with Funtouch OS 15
- System-on-chip: Qualcomm Snapdragon 4 Gen 2
- CPU: Octa-core (2x2.2 GHz Cortex-A78 & 6x2.0 GHz Cortex-A55)
- GPU: Adreno 613
- Memory: 8GB LPDDR4X
- Storage: 128GB, 256GB UFS 3.1
- SIM: Dual Nano-SIM
- Charging: 90W wired fast charging
- Rear camera: 50 MP Sony IMX852 (primary), f/1.79 + 2 MP (depth), f/2.4, with LED flash
- Front camera: 32 MP, f/2.45
- Display: 6.67-inch full-HD+ AMOLED, 2400 x 1080 pixels, 120Hz refresh rate, up to 1,800 nits peak brightness
- Connectivity: Wi-Fi 802.11 a/b/g/n/ac, Bluetooth 5.0, GPS, USB Type-C, 3.5mm headphone jack (assumed)
- Data inputs: In-display fingerprint sensor, accelerometer, proximity, compass
- Website: https://www.vivo.com/in/products/y400-pro-5g

The Vivo Y400 5G is a mid-range Android smartphone manufactured by Vivo, launched in India on August 4, 2025. It is the base variant of the Vivo Y400 Pro and is positioned as a performance-focused offering in the sub-₹25,000 segment. The device features a 6.67-inch full-HD+ AMOLED display with a 120 Hz refresh rate and up to 1,800 nits peak brightness. It is powered by the Qualcomm Snapdragon 4 Gen 2 chipset, with 8GB of LPDDR4X RAM and storage options of 128GB or 256GB UFS 3.1. Running on Android 15 with Funtouch OS 15, the Vivo Y400 5G includes a dual rear camera setup with a 50-megapixel Sony IMX852 primary sensor and a 2-megapixel depth sensor, along with a 32-megapixel front camera. It is equipped with a 6,000mAh battery supporting 90W wired fast charging and has an IP68 and IP69 rating for dust and water resistance. The smartphone is available in Glam White and Olive Green colors and went on sale starting August 7, 2025, priced at ₹21,999 for the 8GB + 128GB variant and ₹23,999 for the 8GB + 256GB variant.

== Price and Availability ==
The Vivo Y400 5G is priced at ₹21,999 for the 8GB RAM + 128GB storage variant and ₹23,999 for the 8GB RAM + 256GB storage variant. It is available in Glam White and Olive Green color options. Sales commenced on August 7, 2025, through Vivo's India e-store, Flipkart, Amazon, and select offline retailers.

== Specifications ==
=== Display ===
The Vivo Y400 5G features a 6.67-inch full-HD+ AMOLED display with a resolution of 2400 x 1080 pixels, a 120 Hz refresh rate, and a peak brightness of 1,800 nits.

=== Processor ===
The smartphone is powered by the Qualcomm Snapdragon 4 Gen 2 chipset, an octa-core processor with a configuration of 2x2.2 GHz Cortex-A78 and 6x2.0 GHz Cortex-A55 cores, paired with an Adreno 613 GPU. This setup offers reliable performance for multitasking, gaming, and other demanding applications in the mid-range segment.

=== Camera ===
The Vivo Y400 5G is equipped with a dual rear camera system, featuring a 50-megapixel Sony IMX852 primary sensor with an f/1.79 aperture for detailed and vibrant photos, complemented by a 2-megapixel depth sensor with an f/2.4 aperture for enhanced portrait shots. The front camera is a 32-megapixel sensor with an f/2.45 aperture, ideal for high-quality selfies and video calls.

=== Battery ===
The device houses a 6,000mAh battery, providing long-lasting power for extended use. It supports 90W wired fast charging, allowing for quick recharges, which is a standout feature in its price range.

=== Connectivity and Features ===
The Vivo Y400 5G supports 5G, 4G/LTE, 3G, and GSM networks, ensuring robust connectivity options. It includes Wi-Fi 802.11 a/b/g/n/ac, Bluetooth 5.0, GPS, and a USB Type-C port. A 3.5mm headphone jack is assumed to be present, though not explicitly confirmed. For security, it features an in-display fingerprint sensor. The smartphone also boasts IP68 and IP69 ratings, offering exceptional resistance to dust and water, making it highly durable.
