= Vivo X27 =

Android smartphone series

vivo X27 vivo X27 Pro
- Brand: vivo
- Manufacturer: vivo
- Type: Smartphone
- Series: vivo X series
- First released: March 18, 2019 (X27); April 2019 (X27 Pro)
- Compatible networks: GSM, CDMA, HSPA, LTE
- Form factor: Slate
- Colors: X27: Blue, Gold, Symphony Summer; X27 Pro: Black, White
- Dimensions: X27: 157.7 × 74.3 × 9 mm X27 Pro: 165.7 × 74.6 × 9 mm
- Weight: X27: 6.63 oz (188 g); X27 Pro: 7.05 oz (200 g)
- Operating system: Android 9.0 "Pie", Funtouch 9
- System-on-chip: Qualcomm Snapdragon 710 (10 nm)
- CPU: Octa-core (2x2.2 GHz 360 Gold & 6x1.7 GHz Kryo 360 Silver)
- GPU: Adreno 616
- Memory: 8 GB RAM
- Storage: X27: 128 GB / 256 GB; X27 Pro: 256 GB
- Removable storage: X27: microSDXC (dedicated slot); X27 Pro: No
- Battery: 4,000 mAh non-removable
- Charging: 18W wired
- Rear camera: Both: Triple setup: 48 MP, f/1.8, (wide), 1/2.0", 0.8µm, PDAF; 13 MP, f/2.2, 13mm (ultrawide); 5 MP auxiliary lens; LED flash, HDR, panorama; Video: 4K@30fps, 1080p@30/60fps
- Front camera: Motorized pop-up: X27: 16 MP, f/2.0, 26mm (wide), 1/3.06", 1.0µm, HDR; X27 Pro: 32 MP, f/2.0, 26mm (wide), 1/2.8", 0.8µm, LED flash, HDR; Video: 1080p@30fps
- Display: X27: 6.39 in (162 mm) Super AMOLED, 1080 × 2340 pixels, 19.5:9 ratio (~400 ppi); X27 Pro: 6.7 in (170 mm) Super AMOLED, 1080 × 2460 pixels (~401 ppi)
- Sound: Loudspeaker, 3.5mm jack X27 Pro: 32-bit/384kHz Hi-Res audio
- Connectivity: Wi-Fi 802.11 a/b/g/n/ac, dual-band, Wi-Fi Direct, Bluetooth 5.0 (A2DP, LE, EDR, aptX), GPS/GLONASS/BDS, USB Type-C 2.0 (OTG on Pro); NFC: Yes (X27 market dependent, X27 Pro standard); Radio: FM radio (X27 only)
- Data inputs: Fingerprint (under display, optical), accelerometer, gyro, proximity, compass
- Model: V1829T/A, V1829A, V1838A, V1829T (X27); V1836A, V1836T, V1838T (X27 Pro)
- Development status: Discontinued

The vivo X27 and vivo X27 Pro are Android-based smartphones manufactured by vivo as part of its premium X-series line. Announced and released in early 2019, both devices feature notch-free displays made possible by motorized mechanical pop-up selfie cameras. The smartphones target the upper mid-range segment, combining advanced mobile photography options with integrated in-display biometric security.

== Specifications ==
=== Hardware ===
Both devices are powered by the Qualcomm SDM710 Snapdragon 710 chipset, which is fabricated on a 10-nanometer process. The silicon architecture consists of an octa-core CPU configuration, which utilizes two 2.2 GHz 360 Gold performance cores paired with six 1.7 GHz Kryo 360 Silver efficiency cores. Graphical rendering duties are handled across both models by the integrated Adreno 616 graphics processing unit.

Display parameters diverge across the two variants despite sharing the underlying Super AMOLED panel technology. The standard model contains a 6.39-inch display with a resolution of 1080 x 2340 pixels and a 19.5:9 aspect ratio, achieving a screen-to-body ratio of roughly 86.8%. The Pro iteration scales up to a larger 6.7-inch display featuring an elongated resolution of 1080 x 2460 pixels while maintaining an identical pixel density of approximately 401 pixels per inch. Biometric authentication is handled uniformly via an optical under-display fingerprint sensor embedded beneath the Super AMOLED screen.

Memory configurations consist of 8 GB of RAM across all models. The standard variant is distributed with options for either 128 GB or 256 GB of internal storage, which can be expanded using a dedicated microSDXC memory card slot. The Pro edition is restricted exclusively to a 256 GB configuration and entirely omits expandable storage capabilities. Both phones house an identical, non-removable 4,000 mAh battery that charges through a USB Type-C 2.0 interface using 18W fast-wired charging technology. For audio connectivity, both versions retain a 3.5mm headphone jack, though the Pro model adds dedicated 32-bit/384kHz Hi-Res audio hardware.

=== Camera ===
The primary camera arrangement on the back of both phones is structured as a triple-camera system. The main shooter utilizes a Sony IMX 48-megapixel wide lens with an f/1.8 aperture, an integrated phase-detection autofocus mechanism, and an individual pixel size of 0.8 micrometers. This sensor is supported by a 13-megapixel ultrawide focal lens alongside a dedicated 5-megapixel low-light auxiliary lens to capture depth information. The primary camera housing records video at resolutions up to 4K at 30 frames per second, as well as 1080p video at either 30 or 60 frames per second.

The motorized pop-up selfie cameras are configured differently depending on the chosen model. The standard variant utilizes a 16-megapixel wide lens with an f/2.0 aperture and 1.0-micrometer pixels. The Pro version utilizes a higher-resolution 32-megapixel wide lens featuring an f/2.0 aperture and a dedicated front-facing LED flash helper module. Front camera configurations on both models cap video recording capabilities at 1080p at 30 frames per second.

=== Software and Connectivity ===
The devices launched running the Android 9.0 Pie operating system, which is customized natively through vivo's proprietary Funtouch 9 user interface skin. Cellular networking configurations support GSM, CDMA, HSPA, and LTE bands with overall connection throughput rated up to LTE Cat12 speeds. Local wireless protocols include dual-band Wi-Fi 802.11 a/b/g/n/ac, Wi-Fi Direct, and Bluetooth 5.0 wireless standards. Global positioning tracking is achieved using GPS, GLONASS, and BDS satellite networks, and near-field communication (NFC) hardware is built into the chassis.
