= Vivo Y300 =

Vivo Y300 5G
- Brand: Vivo
- Manufacturer: Vivo
- Type: Smartphone
- Series: Vivo Y series
- First released: 21 November 2024 (India)
- Availability by region: November 2024
- Compatible networks: 2G / 3G / 4G LTE / 5G
- Form factor: Slate
- Operating system: Android 14
- System-on-chip: Qualcomm Snapdragon 4 Gen 2
- CPU: Octa-core
- GPU: Adreno
- Memory: 8 GB RAM
- Storage: 128 GB / 256 GB
- Removable storage: microSDXC (dedicated slot)
- Battery: 5000 mAh (non-removable)
- Charging: Fast charging
- Rear camera: Dual: 50 MP (wide) + 2 MP (depth)
- Front camera: 32 MP
- Display: 6.67 in AMOLED, 1080 × 2400 pixels, 120 Hz
- Connectivity: Wi-Fi, Bluetooth, GPS, USB-C

The Vivo Y300 is an Android-based mid-range smartphone developed and manufactured by Vivo. It is part of the company's Y series lineup, positioned as an affordable 5G-enabled device with balanced specifications targeting general consumers.

== Design and Display ==
The Vivo Y300 features a sleek design with an AMOLED display measuring approximately 6.67 inches, offering a Full HD+ resolution and a 120 Hz refresh rate for smoother motion on screen. The device includes an in-display optical fingerprint sensor for biometric authentication. The display supports high brightness levels for improved visibility in various lighting conditions.

== Specifications ==
=== Hardware ===
The Y300 is powered by a Qualcomm Snapdragon 4 Gen 2 processor paired with up to 8 GB of RAM and up to 256 GB of internal storage. The chipset provides balanced performance for daily tasks, multitasking, and light gaming.

=== Cameras ===
The smartphone is equipped with a dual-rear camera system, consisting of a 50 megapixel primary sensor and a 2 megapixel depth sensor. On the front, it has a 32 megapixel selfie camera. The camera setup supports standard photography and video recording functions.

=== Software ===
The Vivo Y300 runs on Android with Vivo's custom user interface. The software includes typical features for customization, connectivity, and device management.
