= Vivo Y3 =

Vivo smartphone from 2019

Vivo Y3, Vivo Y3s
- Brand: Vivo
- Series: Vivo Y Series
- First released: May 2019 (Y3); October 26, 2020 (Y3s)
- Compatible networks: List: Primary SIM: GSM (850/900/1800); UMTS (850/900/2100); CDMA800; TD-SCDMA (1900/2100); LTE (850/900/1800/2100); TD-LTE (1900/2000/2300/2500/2600); GPRS, EDGE, UMTS, HSUPA, HSUPA 5.8, HSDPA, HSPA+ 21.1, cdmaOne, CDMA2000 1x, CDMA2000 1xEV-DO, CDMA2000 1xEV-DO Rev A, TD-SCDMA, TD-HSDPA, LTE, LTE 100/50, LTE 150/50 Secondary SIM: GSM (850/900/1800); UMTS (850/900/2100); GPRS, EDGE, UMTS, HSUPA, HSUPA 5.8, HSDPA, HSPA+ 21.1
- Dimensions: 159.4x76.7x8.9 mm; 6.28x3.02x0.35 in
- Weight: 190.5 g (6.70 oz)
- Operating system: Funtouch 9.0 running on Android 9.0 (Pie)
- System-on-chip: Mediatek MT6765 Helio P35 (12nm)
- CPU: 4x2.3 GHz Cortex-A53; 4x1.8 GHz Cortex-A53
- GPU: PowerVR GE8320, 680MHz (Boost clock)
- Memory: 4GB Single channel LPDDR3, 933MHz
- Storage: Y3: 64/128GB (eMMC 5.1); Y3s: 128GB (eMMC 5.1)
- Removable storage: microSDXC (Up to 256GB)
- Battery: Non-removable Li-Po 5000mAh
- Charging: Fast charging 18W, 9V/2A
- Rear camera: 1st Camera: Wide, CMOS, 4160x3120 (4:3), 12.98MP, f/2.2; 2nd Camera (Y3 Exclusive): 13mm Ultrawide, 8 MP, f/2.2, 120 degree FOV; 3rd Camera: Depth, 2MP, f/2.4
- Front camera: 4608X3456 (4:3), 15.93MP, f/2.0, 26mm (wide), 1/3.06", 1.0 μm; Face unlock
- Display: Type: IPS LCD; Size: 6.35 inches, 99.6 cm^2; Resolution: 720x1544, 268 ppi; Ratios: 15:7 aspect ratio, 81.5% StB ratio; Asahi Glass (Y3); Gorilla Glass 5 (Y3s)
- Sound: Loudspeaker: Yes; 3.5mm jack: Yes
- Media: Audio: AAC, AMR / AMR-NB / GSM-AMR, aptX / apt-X, eAAC+ / aacPlus v2 / HE-AAC v2, FLAC, MIDI, MP3, OGG, WMA, WAV; Video: 3GPP, AVI, H.263, H.264 / MPEG-4 PArt 10 / AVC video, MP4, WebM, Xvid
- Connectivity: Wi-Fi 802.11 a/b/g/n/ac, dual-band, Wi-Fi Direct, hotspot; Bluetooth 5.0, A2DP, LE; GPS, A-GPS, GLONASS, BeiDou; FM radio; microUSB 2.0, USB On-The-Go
- Data inputs: Rear-mounted Fingerprint scanner; Accelerometer; Proximity; Magnetometer
- Model: V1901A, V1901T
- SAR: US: 1.007 W/kg (head), 0.752 W/kg (body)
- Made in: China
- Other: Colors: Peacock blue, Peach powder (pink), Ink blue (Y3); Dark Blue, Red, Sea Breeze (Y3s); Price: 190 EUR, 15,090 Rupee
- Website: https://www.vivo.com/en/products

The Vivo Y3 was launched in May 2019 by Vivo. The Vivo Y3s phone served as an even more budget friendly variant, reducing prices by cutting out the Ultra-wide camera, and launched much later, on October 26, 2020. The pricing for the Vivo Y3 was around €190 (¥1500), and the Vivo Y3s launched with a price of €150 (¥1170).
