= Vivo Y56 =

2023 smartphone developed by Vivo

vivo Y56
- Developer: vivo
- Manufacturer: Vivo
- Type: Smartphone
- Series: Vivo Y
- First released: February 17, 2023; 3 years ago
- Availability by region: February 17, 2023; 3 years ago (worldwide)
- Predecessor: Vivo Y55
- Successor: Vivo Y58
- Compatible networks: GSM (2G); 850 / 900 / 1800 / 1900; HSDPA (3G); 850 / 900 / 2100; LTE (4G); 1, 3, 5, 8, 38, 40, 41; 5G; 1, 3, 8, 28, 77, 78 SA/NSA
- Colors: Orange Shimmer, Black Engine
- Dimensions: 164.1 x 75.6 x 8.2 mm (6.46 x 2.98 x 0.32 in)
- Weight: 6.49 oz (184 g)
- Operating system: Android 13, Funtouch 13
- System-on-chip: Mediatek Dimensity 700 (7 nm)
- CPU: Octa-core (2x2.2 GHz Cortex-A76 & 6x2.0 GHz Cortex-A55)
- GPU: Mali-G57 MC2
- Memory: 4/8GB RAM
- Storage: 128GB internal memory
- Removable storage: microSDXC (uses shared SIM slot)
- SIM: Nano-SIM + Nano-SIM
- Battery: 5000 mAh
- Charging: 18W wired, USB Type-C, OTG
- Rear camera: Dual camera 50 MP, f/1.8, (wide), 1/2.76", 0.64μm, PDAF, LED flash, HDR, panorama Video: 1080p@30fps
- Front camera: 16 MP, f/2.0, (wide); Video: 1080p@30fps
- Display: Type: IPS LCD; Size: 6.58 inches, 104.3 cm^{2} (~84.1% screen-to-body ratio); Resulution: 1080 x 2408 pixels, 20:9 ratio (~401 ppi density)
- Data inputs: Wi-Fi 802.11 a/b/g/n/ac, Bluetooth dual-band, 5.1, A2DP, LE, GPS, GLONASS, GALILEO, BDS, QZSS
- Water resistance: IPX4 water/ IP5X dust resistant
- Website: https://www.vivo.com/en/products/y56-5g

The Vivo Y56, specifically known as Vivo Y56 5G, is a mid-range Android smartphone released by the Chinese technology company Vivo. It was officially announced and released on February 17, 2023. This phone is part of Vivo's "Y" series, which typically focuses on delivering feature-packed smartphones at affordable price points.

The Y56's frame and back design is made of plastic with a "vivo" wordmark displayed at the bottom corner. The Vivo Y56 is only available at Orange Shimmer and Black Engine color options.

The Vivo Y56 is a 5G-enabled smartphone, supporting both SA (Standalone) and NSA (Non-Standalone) 5G networks. It is compatible with various 5G bands, including n1, n3, n8, n28, n77, and n78, ensuring wide coverage in regions where 5G services are available. This allows for faster download speeds, lower latency, and enhanced streaming capabilities compared to 4G networks.

== Specifications ==
=== Processor ===
==== Chipset ====
The Vivo Y56 is powered by the MediaTek Dimensity 700 (7 nm) processor.

==== CPU and GPU ====
This octa-core chipset includes 2x 2.2 GHz Cortex-A76 cores and 6x 2.0 GHz Cortex-A55 cores. It also features a Mali-G57 MC2 GPU for graphics.

=== Display ===
The Vivo Y56 features a 6.58-inch Full HD+ LCD display, featuring a 1080 x 2408 pixels with 20:9 aspect ratio and a ~401 ppi density.

=== Battery ===
The Vivo Y56 is equipped with a 5000 mAh (typical) battery. Vivo's AI Battery Management is designed to optimize background processes to extend battery life.

While 18W charging isn't the fastest compared to higher-end devices, it's reasonably quick. Some reports indicate charging from 0% to 50% in about 30 minutes to 40 minutes.

== Camera ==
=== Main Camera ===
The Y56's camera module is a 50 MP (megapixels) with an aperture of f/1.8. This is the primary sensor responsible for most general photography. The Bokeh lens has a 2 MP with an aperture of f/2.4. This secondary lens assists in capturing depth information for portrait mode, allowing for blurred backgrounds.

=== Front Camera ===
The front camera is a 16 MP with an aperture of f/2.0. It can also record a video at 1080p@30fps.
