= Vivo Y90 =

Entry-level smartphone

- Brand: Vivo
- Manufacturer: Vivo
- Type: Smartphone
- Series: vivo Y
- First released: July 22, 2019; 7 years ago
- Compatible networks: GSM / HSPA / LTE
- Form factor: Slate
- Colors: Black, Gold
- Dimensions: 155.1 × 75.1 × 8.3 mm (6.11 × 2.96 × 0.33 in)
- Weight: 5.78 oz (164 g)
- Operating system: Android 8.1 (Oreo), Funtouch 4.5
- System-on-chip: Mediatek MT6761 Helio A22 (12 nm)
- CPU: Quad-core 2.0 GHz Cortex-A53
- GPU: PowerVR GE8320
- Memory: 2GB
- Storage: 16GB / 32GB
- SIM: Dual Nano-SIM
- Battery: 4,030 mAh, non-removable
- Rear camera: 8 MP, f/2.0, AF; LED flash, panorama Video: 1080p@30fps
- Front camera: 5 MP, f/1.8 Video: 720p
- Display: IPS LCD, 6.22 inches Resolution: 720 x 1520 pixels, 19:9 ratio

The vivo Y90 is an entry-level Android smartphone manufactured and marketed by Vivo. First unveiled on July 22, 2019, it was first released on July 25 in Pakistan, and 2 days later in India.

== Specifications ==
=== Design and build ===
The vivo Y90 features a standard slate form factor built with a glass front, a plastic back, and a plastic frame. The smartphone measures 155.1 mm in length, 75.1 mm in width, and has a thickness of 8.3 mm. It is a lightweight device that weighs approximately 163.5 grams. The phone accommodates a dual-SIM setup accepting two Nano-SIM cards simultaneously. It was manufactured and distributed in two distinct color options, which are Black and Gold.

=== Performance & memory ===
The smartphone is powered by a MediaTek MT6761 Helio A22 chipset built on a 12-nanometer process. Its central processing unit consists of a quad-core 2.0 GHz Cortex-A53 configuration, which is paired with a PowerVR GE8320 graphics processing unit. The smartphone comes equipped with 2 GB of RAM and is available in either 16 GB or 32 GB of eMMC 5.1 storage. Storage expansion is supported via a dedicated microSDXC card slot.

=== Display ===
The front of the vivo Y90 is housed by a 6.22-inch IPS LCD panel that provides a screen-to-body ratio of approximately 82.9%. The display features a resolution of 720 x 1520 pixels with a 19:9 aspect ratio and a pixel density of roughly 270 ppi. Energy is provided by a non-removable 4030 mAh battery. In terms of hardware sensors, the device incorporates an accelerometer, a proximity sensor, and a compass.

=== Cameras ===
The primary imaging system on the back features a single 8-megapixel camera with an f/2.0 aperture and autofocus capabilities. This rear setup includes an LED flash, supports panorama photography, and can record video up to 1080p resolution at 30 frames per second.

The phone has a single 5-megapixel front-facing camera with an f/1.8 aperture that supports 720p video recording.

=== Software ===
The device operates on the Android 8.1 Oreo operating system customized with vivo's proprietary Funtouch 4.5 user interface.
