= Vivo Y02 =

2022 smartphone model

vivo Y02
- Brand: vivo
- Manufacturer: Vivo
- Series: Y series
- Availability by region: November 29, 2022
- Compatible networks: GSM, HSPA, LTE
- Colors: Cosmic Grey, Orchid Blue
- Dimensions: 164×75.6×8.5 mm (6.46×2.98×0.33 in)
- Weight: 186 g (6.56 oz)
- Operating system: Android 12 (Go edition), Funtouch 12
- System-on-chip: MediaTek MT6762 Helio P22 (12 nm)
- CPU: Octa-core 2.0 GHz Cortex-A53
- GPU: PowerVR GE8320
- Memory: 2 GB or 3 GB RAM
- Storage: 32 GB eMMC 5.1
- Removable storage: microSDXC (dedicated slot)
- SIM: Dual Nano-SIM
- Battery: 5,000 mAh non-removable Li-Po
- Charging: 10 W wired, 5 W reverse wired
- Rear camera: 8 MP, f/2.0, LED flash, 1080p@30fps video
- Front camera: 5 MP, f/2.2
- Display: 6.51 in (165 mm) IPS LCD; Resolution: 720 × 1600 pixels, 20:9 ratio (~270 ppi density)
- Connectivity: Dual-band Wi-Fi (802.11 a/b/g/n/ac), Bluetooth 5.0, GPS/GLONASS/GALILEO/BDS/QZSS, FM radio, USB OTG
- Data inputs: Accelerometer, proximity sensor

The vivo Y02 is an entry-level Android smartphone manufactued and designed by vivo. It was released on November 29, 2022, with Indian release on December 5 and Philippine release on December 9 at this year.

== Design ==
The vivo Y02 features a modern entry-level build composed of a glass front panel, paired with a plastic back and a plastic frame. It has physical dimensions of 164 mm × 75.6 mm × 8.5 mm (6.46 in × 2.98 in × 0.33 in) and weighs approximately 186 grams (6.56 oz).

The front of the device is dominated by a notched display with an 82.5% screen-to-body ratio. The rear panel incorporates a distinct circular camera housing module. It is available in two color variants: Cosmic Grey and Orchid Blue. The device supports a dual-SIM layout, accommodating two Nano-SIM cards alongside a dedicated expansion slot.

== Specifications ==
=== Hardware ===
The vivo Y02 is powered by a 12-nanometer MediaTek MT6762 Helio P22 chipset, which features an octa-core CPU configuration composed entirely of Cortex-A53 cores clocked at up to 2.0 GHz. Graphics processing is handled by an integrated PowerVR GE8320 GPU.

The smartphone is offered in configurations of either 2 GB or 3 GB of RAM, paired with 32 GB of eMMC 5.1 internal storage. Storage capacity can be expanded via a dedicated microSDXC card slot. It is equipped with a non-removable 5,000 mAh battery, supporting 10W wired charging as well as 5W reverse wired charging capabilities.

=== Display ===
The device features a 6.51-inch IPS LCD panel with a surface area of approximately 102.3 cm². It has an HD+ resolution of 720 × 1600 pixels, conforming to a 20:9 aspect ratio, which results in a pixel density of roughly 270 ppi.

=== Cameras ===
The vivo Y02 utilizes a single-lens rear setup consisting of an 8-megapixel sensor with an f/2.0 aperture. The camera array includes an LED flash and is capable of capturing video at 1080p resolution at 30 frames per second. On the front, a single 5-megapixel camera with an f/2.2 aperture is housed within the display notch for selfies and video calls.

=== Software, connectivity, and audio ===
The vivo Y02 launched running Android 12 (Go edition), a version of the Android operating system optimized for entry-level hardware, customized with vivo's proprietary Funtouch 12 user interface skin.

The smartphone supports GSM, HSPA, and 4G LTE cellular network technologies. Local wireless connectivity includes dual-band Wi-Fi (802.11 a/b/g/n/ac) and Bluetooth 5.0 with A2DP and LE support. Global positioning is facilitated via GPS, GLONASS, GALILEO, BDS, and QZSS.

The device does not include Near Field Communication (NFC) but features a built-in FM radio receiver. Physical connectivity relies on a legacy microUSB 2.0 port with USB On-The-Go (OTG) functionality. For audio, the Y02 retains a 3.5mm headphone jack alongside its integrated loudspeaker. Built-in sensors are limited to an accelerometer and a proximity sensor.
