= Origin OS =

Android-based mobile operating system developed by Vivo

- Screenshot of OriginOS 6
- Developer: Vivo
- Written in: C, C++, Java, Kotlin
- OS family: Android (Linux)
- Working state: Current
- Source model: Partially open source
- Initial release: 1.0 (Based on Android 11) / November 18, 2020; 5 years ago
- Latest release: 7.0 (Based on Android 17) / September 21, 2026; 41 days ago
- Marketing target: Global
- Available in: 29+ languages
- List of languages: 29+ languages; Deutsch – German; English – English; Español – Spanish; Filipino – Filipino; Français – French; Indonesia – Indonesian; Italiano – Italian; Melayu – Malay; Nederlands – Dutch; Português – Portuguese; Tiếng Việt – Vietnamese; Türkçe – Turkish; Русский – Russian; ئۇيغۇرلار – Uyghur; اردو – Urdu; العربية – Arabic; नेपाली – Nepali; हिन्दी – Hindi; বাংলা – Bangla; සිංහල – Sinhala; ไทย – Thai; བོད་ཡིག་ – Tibetan; ລາວ – Lao; မြန်မာ (Zawgyi) – Burmese (Zawgyi); ខ្មែរ – Khmer; 한국어 – Korean; 日本語 – Japanese; 简体中文 (中国) – Simplified Chinese (China); 繁體中文 (台灣) – Traditional Chinese (Taiwan); 繁體中文 (香港) – Traditional Chinese (Hong Kong)
- Package manager: V-Appstore (Note: (also called Vivo App Store) Chinese: Vivo应用商店; pinyin: Vivo Yìngyòng Shāngdiàn; This app is only available in Chinese.); Google Play Store (Note: It is not pre-installed on Chinese Vivo phones, but it is supported to install or sideload the Google Play Store on the Vivo App Store (V-Appstore).)
- Supported platforms: 64-bit ARM
- Kernel type: Linux Kernel
- Default user interface: Graphical user interface (multi-touch)
- License: Proprietary; GNU General Public License (Linux Kernel)
- Preceded by: Funtouch OS 10 in November 2020 (China); Funtouch OS 15 in October 2025 (Global)
- Official website: www.vivo.com/en/originos

Origin OS, also known as OriginOS (stylized in all lowercase as orıgınos), is an Android-based operating system by Vivo, a Chinese multinational technology company. It was officially released on November 18, 2020. It replaced the operating system on their Vivo and iQOO phones, and is the successor to Funtouch OS.

== Design ==
Origin OS is the successor of Funtouch OS. Its design style is flatter and more visual. It also provides a "parallel space" design for users who like the original Funtouch OS. Users can switch between the traditional interface and the new interface. At the same time, Origin OS supports customizing the size, length, etc. of application icons, which is officially called the Klotski Grid system.

Origin OS also has special features such as "atomic components" and "behavioral wallpapers". The former can be regarded as an upgraded version of the desktop widgets of Android and iOS. The latter is linked to the number of walking steps, and the changes in the desktop dynamic wallpaper are controlled by the number of walking steps.

== Version history ==
Origin OS 1.0 is based on the Android 11 operating system. It was first installed on the Vivo X60 series and would later be gradually adapted to other Vivo phones.

Origin OS Ocean (2.0) is based on the Android 12 operating system. This version does not follow the traditional digital iteration method but uses Ocean as the new version name.

Origin OS 3 (3.0) is based on Android 13 operating system.

Origin OS 4 (4.0) is based on the Android 14 operating system and adds the "Blue Heart Little V" global intelligent assistance function. According to the official website, Lanxin Xiao V, or Xiao V (AI Assistant), is developed based on AI technology and can bring more useful system intelligence experiences to users. Origin OS 4 also further optimizes response time, UI design, and adds vivo Sans fonts.

Origin OS 5 (5.0) is based on the Android 15 operating system.

Origin OS 6 (6.0) is based on the Android 16 operating system, featuring Dynamic Glow. Textures respond and details come alive under the play of light. It introduces morphing animations with water droplet effects. With the Snap-up engine, the system can detect ticketing windows (e.g., concert, movie, flight, or train tickets) and automatically process purchases. It also offers a 5-year smooth experience with the Origin Smooth Engine.

== Development and release ==
Vivo officially on November 18 2020, at the Vivo Developer Conference in Shenzhen, China. It was done with the motive to address the feedback of the users regarding Funtouch OS and to go along with modern trends in Android customization.

The new Origin OS comes pre-installed on the Vivo X60 series, which was one of the first sets of devices to use this new operating system. The system has been upgraded over time to continue improving its performance, adding more options for user customization, and providing better security, although Origin OS remains only available in China, where it has not yet had an official rollout elsewhere.

The move further forms part of the broader efforts by Vivo to strengthen in-house software development and reduce reliance on third-party software providers. This is also a means by which the company can create a more localized user experience for its market in China. Now, Vivo has finally planned or announced to extend the scope to international markets.
