= Funtouch OS =

Android-based mobile operating system developed by Vivo

- FuntouchOS 15 home screen
- Developer: Vivo
- Written in: C, C++, Java
- OS family: Android (Linux)
- Working state: Discontinued
- Source model: Partially open source
- Initial release: 1.0 (Based on Android 4.2.2), October 15, 2013; 13 years ago (China); 2.0 (Based on Android 4.3) (Global), September 30, 2014; 12 years ago
- Latest release: 15 (Based on Android 15) / September 30, 2024; 2 years ago
- Marketing target: Global
- Available in: 80+ languages
- Package manager: V-Appstore (Note: (also called Vivo App Store) The V-Appstore that is installed on Chinese Vivo phones will be available only in Chinese.); Google Play Store (Note: It is not pre-installed on Vivo phones from the Chinese market that installed Funtouch OS, but it is supported to install or sideload the Google Play Store on the Vivo App Store (V-Appstore).); APK
- Supported platforms: ARMv7 (only for Jelly Bean and KitKat), ARMv8, ARMv9
- Kernel type: Single kernel, modified Linux kernel
- Default user interface: Graphical user interface (multi-touch)
- License: GNU General Public License V3; Apache License 2.0; Proprietary
- Preceded by: Funtouch OS on September 30, 2025
- Succeeded by: Origin OS on October 15, 2025
- Official website: vivo.com (Global) vivo.com.cn (China)

Funtouch OS is an Android-based operating system developed by Vivo. It was initially released in 2013 and serves as the primary software on Vivo smartphones. The operating system is based on the Android platform and has been modified to improve the user experience. Some of the features specific to Vivo smartphones include a new user interface and a virtual assistant known as Jovi.

== History ==
The Vivo X5 was the first device to run Funtouch OS 2.0 in 2014. Although it is based on Android 4.4.2, the operating system has been modified to provide functions and design elements exclusive to Vivo devices. Funtouch OS has seen numerous updates over the years, each of which has added new functionality and enhancements to the system.

On November 19, 2020, Vivo announced the launch of a new generation mobile phone system, Origin OS (the international version still uses Funtouch OS) at the Shenzhen Conference, replacing the current Funtouch OS user interface. OriginOS has improved the visual and tactile smoothness, and also strengthened RAM management, which can achieve the effect of increasing "virtual RAM" through better utilization of built-in storage space.

In 2025, Vivo announced that future Vivo phones released globally will be shipped with Origin OS. The Vivo X300 series were the first phones to be launched with OriginOS 6.

== Version history ==
Firmware version	Android version	Ref.
Funtouch OS 1.0/1.1	Android 4.2.2	
Funtouch OS 2.0/2.1/2.5/2.6	Android 4.3/4.4.2/4.4.4/5.0/5.1/5.1.1/6.0	
Funtouch OS 3.0/3.1/3.2	Android 6.0.1/7.1.1/7.1.2	
Funtouch OS 4.0/4.5	Android 8.1.0	
Funtouch OS 9.0/9.1/9.2	Android 9/10/11	
Funtouch OS 10/10.5	Android 10/11/12	
Funtouch OS 11/11.1	Android 11	
Funtouch OS 12	Android 11/12	
Funtouch OS 13	Android 13	
Funtouch OS 14	Android 14	
Funtouch OS 15	Android 15	

== See also ==
- List of custom Android distributions
