= Vivo (technology company) =

Chinese technology company

Vivo Mobile Communication Co., Ltd.

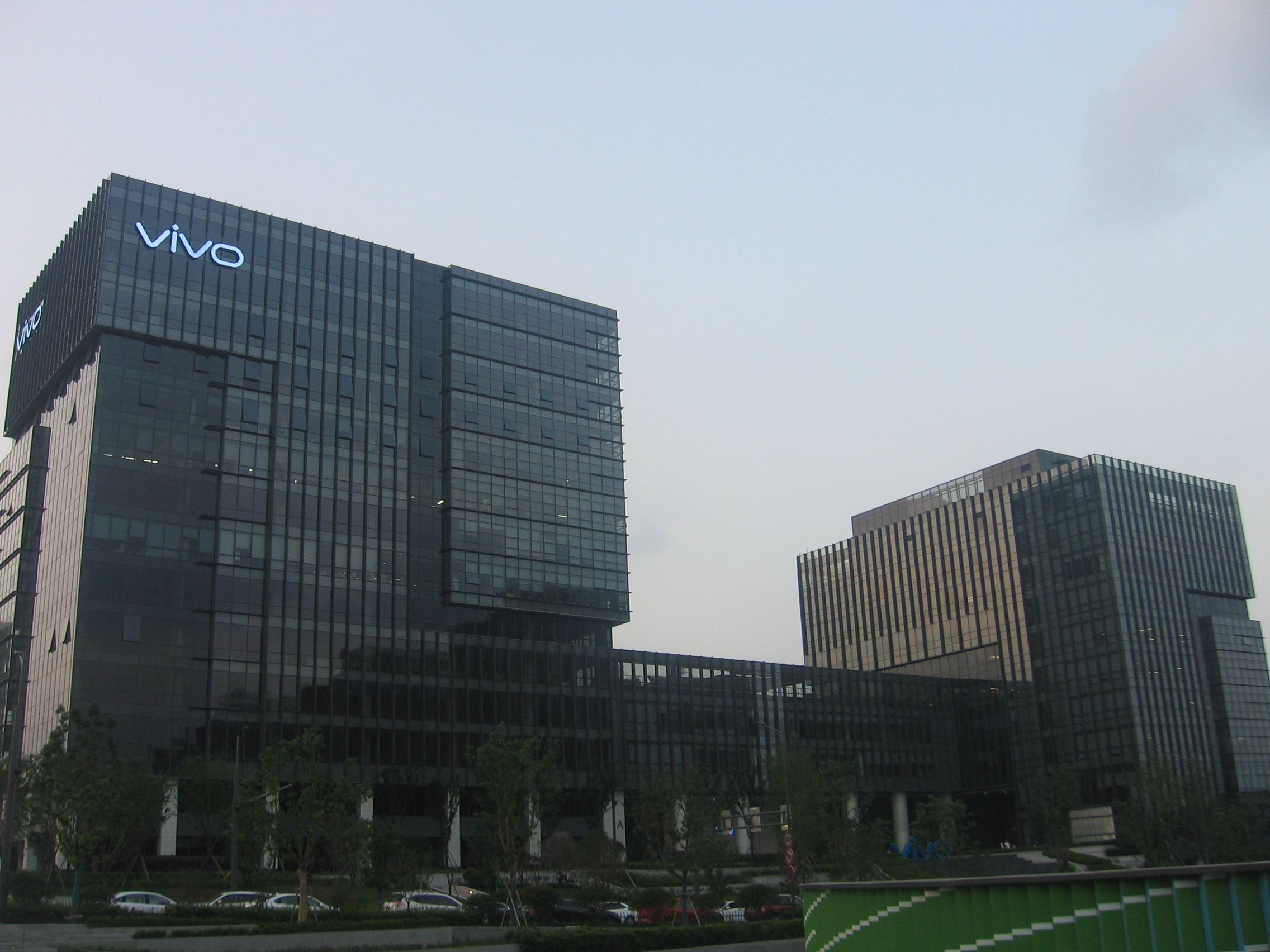
- Vivo building in Nanjing, Jiangsu
- Native name: 维沃移动通信有限公司
- Type: Private
- Industry: Consumer electronics
- Founded: May 22, 2009; 17 years ago
- Founders: Shen Wei; Duan Yongping
- Headquarters: Dongguan, Guangdong, China
- Area served: Worldwide (Note: Australia, Bangladesh, Brazil (as Jovi), Cambodia, China, Ghana, India, Indonesia, Malaysia, Mexico, Myanmar, Nepal, Pakistan, Philippines, Russia, Singapore, Sri Lanka, South Africa, Taiwan, Thailand, Turkey, Ukraine, United Kingdom, United States, and Vietnam)
- Key people: Shen Wei (CEO); Baishan Hu (executive vice president & COO); Spark Ni (senior vice president & CMO); Yujian Shi (senior vice president & CTO)
- Products: Smartphones; Software and Online services
- Owner: BBK Electronics (2009–2023); Shen Wei (2023–present)
- Number of employees: 40,000 (2022)
- Subsidiaries: iQOO and Jovi

Chinese name
- Simplified Chinese: 维沃移动通信有限公司
- Traditional Chinese: 維沃移動通信有限公司
- Literal meaning: Vivo Mobile Communications Co., Ltd.
Transcriptions
Standard Mandarin
- Hanyu Pinyin: Wéi Wò Yídòng Tōngxìn Yǒuxiàn Gōngsī
- Website: https://www.vivo.com/en

Vivo Budget Smartphones Leak With 120Hz Displays microSD Support. Vivo Mobile Communication Co., Ltd., d/b/a vivo (stylized as all lowercase), is a Chinese multinational technology company headquartered in Dongguan, Guangdong, that designs and develops smartphones, smartphone accessories, software, and online services. The company develops software for its phones, distributed through its V-Appstore, with iManager included in their proprietary, Android-based operating system, Origin OS in mainland China, and currently discontinued Funtouch OS elsewhere. It has 40,000 employees, with 10 R&D centers in Shenzhen, Dongguan, Nanjing, Beijing, Hangzhou, Shanghai, Xi'an, Taipei, Tokyo, and San Diego.

== History ==
Since its founding in 2009, Vivo has expanded its global market, serving over 400 million users with its mobile products and services in over 60 countries and regions.

In 2017, Vivo entered the smartphone market in Taiwan, Hong Kong, Macau, Russia, Brunei, Cambodia, Laos, Sri Lanka, Bangladesh, and Nepal, Vietnam. In June 2017, it entered the Pakistan smartphone market, and the Vivo brand is currently experiencing rapid growth and popularity in the country. In October 2020, Vivo announced that it would begin to sell its products also in Europe.

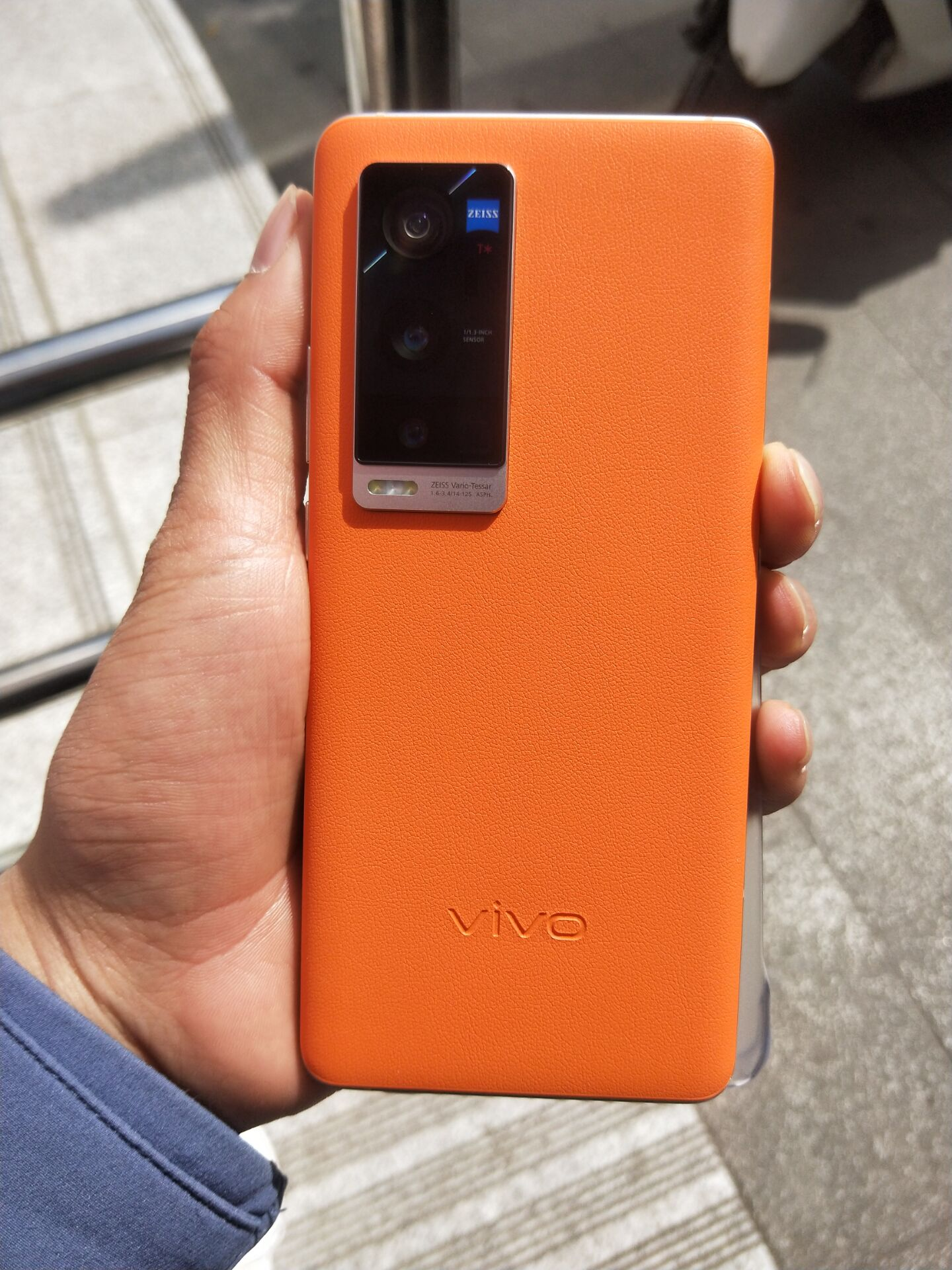
Vivo X60 featured the Zeiss co-engineered imaging system.

Vivo officially launched in Pakistan in the year 2017. Since then, they have been offering their smartphones and other products in the Pakistani market. On 17 December 2020, Vivo and Zeiss announced a long-term strategic partnership to jointly promote and develop breakthrough innovations in mobile imaging technology. The first "Vivo Zeiss co-engineered imaging system" was featured in the Vivo X60 series. As part of the collaboration agreement, Vivo and Zeiss established the Vivo Zeiss Imaging Lab, a joint R&D program to innovate mobile imaging technology for Vivo's flagship smartphones.

In 2023, Vivo was ranked among the top 5 smartphone makers, achieving a global market share of 10%.

In April 2021, three pallets of Vivo phones caught fire at Hong Kong International Airport, prompting a ban on air freight of Vivo phones through Hong Kong.

In June 2022, Vivo entered the world-famous Guinness Book of Records. It achieved the record for the "Longest Video," in which its flagship device Vivo X Fold, happened to be folded over 300,000 times for a total length of 270 hours or 11 days and 6 hours.

In November 2023, Vivo announced BlueOS, an open-source distributed operating system for Internet of Things (IoT) smart devices and wearables with Vivo Watch 3 featuring the new operating system.

In December 2024, Dixon Technologies has announced plans to establish a joint venture (JV) with smartphone manufacturer Vivo.

The logo of Jovi, used in Brazil.

In April 2025, Vivo entered Brazil, however, due to there being an identically named telecommunications company in the country, Vivo, owned by Telefónica, the Chinese company instead uses the name Jovi.

=== Marketing ===
In October 2015, Vivo became the title sponsor of the Indian Premier League (IPL) under a two-year deal starting in the 2016 season. In July 2017, the deal was extended until 2022. However, in response to the 2020–2021 China–India skirmishes between India and China, the Board of Control for Cricket in India (BCCI) was criticised in India for allowing a Chinese company to be the title sponsor of the league. Vivo and BCCI mutually agreed to suspend the deal for the 2020 season, with a clause to resume it next season.

In June 2017, Vivo reached a sponsorship deal with FIFA to become the official smartphone brand of the 2018 and 2022 FIFA World Cups. The company also signed a deal with UEFA as an official partner of the UEFA Euro 2020 and UEFA Euro 2024, and became a title sponsor of India's Pro Kabaddi League.

Vivo has a sponsorship deal with the NBA in China, with Golden State Warriors player Stephen Curry. He endorses the brand in China and the Philippines. In March 2024, Vivo became the main sponsor for Nepal Idol. They became the official smartphone brand for the television series.

== Controversy ==
=== IMEI and build number controversy in India ===
In June 2020, the cybercrime unit of Meerut Police revealed that more than 13,500 Vivo smartphones used in India were operating with the same IMEI number. The IMEI number is a 15-digit code intended to be unique to each mobile device, which can be used for tracking criminals or stolen mobile phones. By using the same IMEI number for multiple devices, Vivo may have hindered police efforts to track criminals or stolen devices. In 2017, the Telecom Regulatory Authority of India issued a statement requiring all mobile devices to have a unique IMEI number. Failure to comply would be considered tampering and could result in a fine or imprisonment for up to three years.

The events led to the police filing a case against Vivo and its service center. The issue reportedly came to light when a police officer submitted his mobile phone to the staff at the cybercrime unit for examination, as the phone was not functioning properly despite being repaired at a Vivo service center in Meerut. The cybercrime unit discovered that the IMEI number of the device differed from the one printed on the box. They then forwarded the IMEI number to an unidentified telecommunications company that provides services for the handset and requested the relevant data. The company informed them that as of 24 September 2019, the same IMEI number had been associated with 13,557 mobile phones across different states in the country. The Meerut police reportedly issued a notice to Vivo India's nodal officer, Harmanjit Singh, under Section 91 of the CrPC and also registered a case under Section 420 of the Indian Penal Code.

=== Tax evasion allegation in India ===
The Directorate of Revenue Intelligence of India (DRI) raided the offices of Vivo in July 2022 and accused the company of tax evasion. The company allegedly remitted almost half of its turnover out of India. The Enforcement Directorate also blocked the bank accounts of the company to prevent further money laundering. The agency also found that some top executives of Vivo who are Chinese had incorporated 23 shell companies in India, with the help of a Chartered Accountant, Nitin Grg. "These (23) companies are found to have transferred huge amounts of funds to Vivo India. Further, out of the total sale proceeds of Rs 1,25,185 crore, Vivo India remitted Rs 62,476 crore or almost 50 percent of the turnover out of India, mainly to China", the ED said in a statement. In October 2023, the Enforcement Directorate arrested the head of administration of Vivo India on money laundering charges.
