= Video games in North Korea =

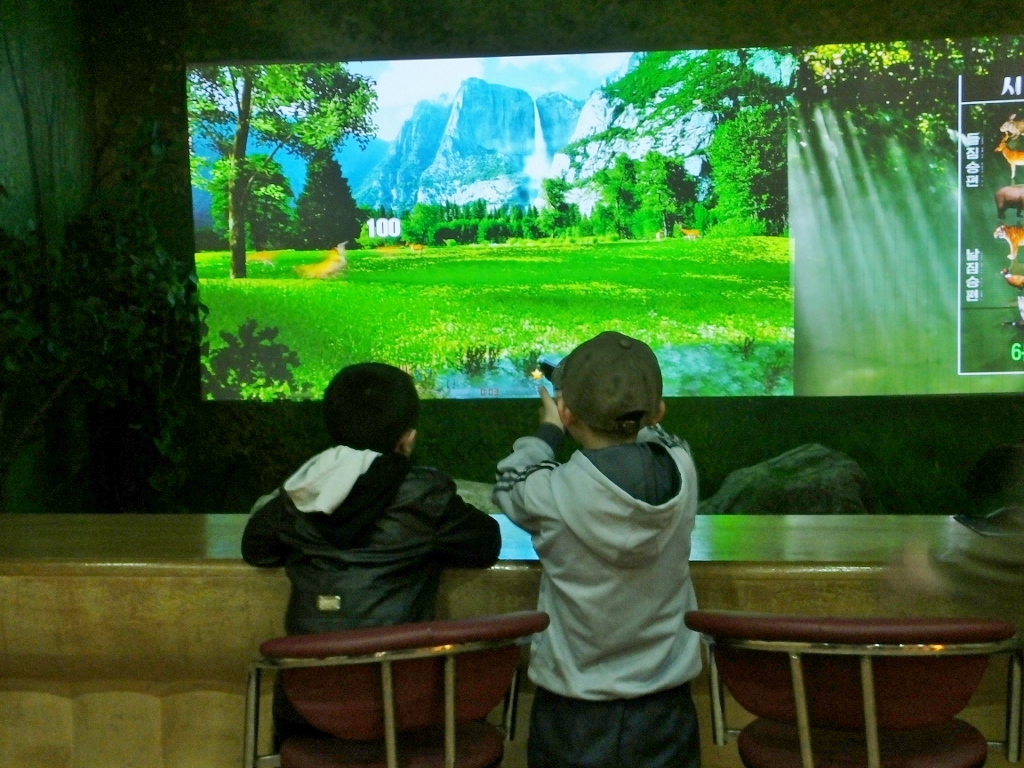
Children playing a light-gun shooter game in North Korea

North Korea has a burgeoning video game industry. North Koreans play video games on mobile phones, personal computers, home consoles, and in arcades. North Korea does develop its own video games, although foreign games are also popular among young people in the country as they are often distributed through jangmadang, or North Korean black markets.

Video games first appeared in the country during the 1990s in amusement arcades, and foreign cabinets are available in locations such as the Pyongyang Gold Lane and Rungra People's Pleasure Ground. Mobile games gained popularity in the 2010s with the success of a puzzle game called Strength (힘), leading to increased investment in the North Korean video game industry. Around 250 mobile games are available in North Korea. PC games are also popular among the country's youth, with foreign games often being distributed illegally on USB flash drives. Foreign home video game consoles such as those produced by Nintendo, Sony, and Subor are also available in North Korea.

== Arcades ==
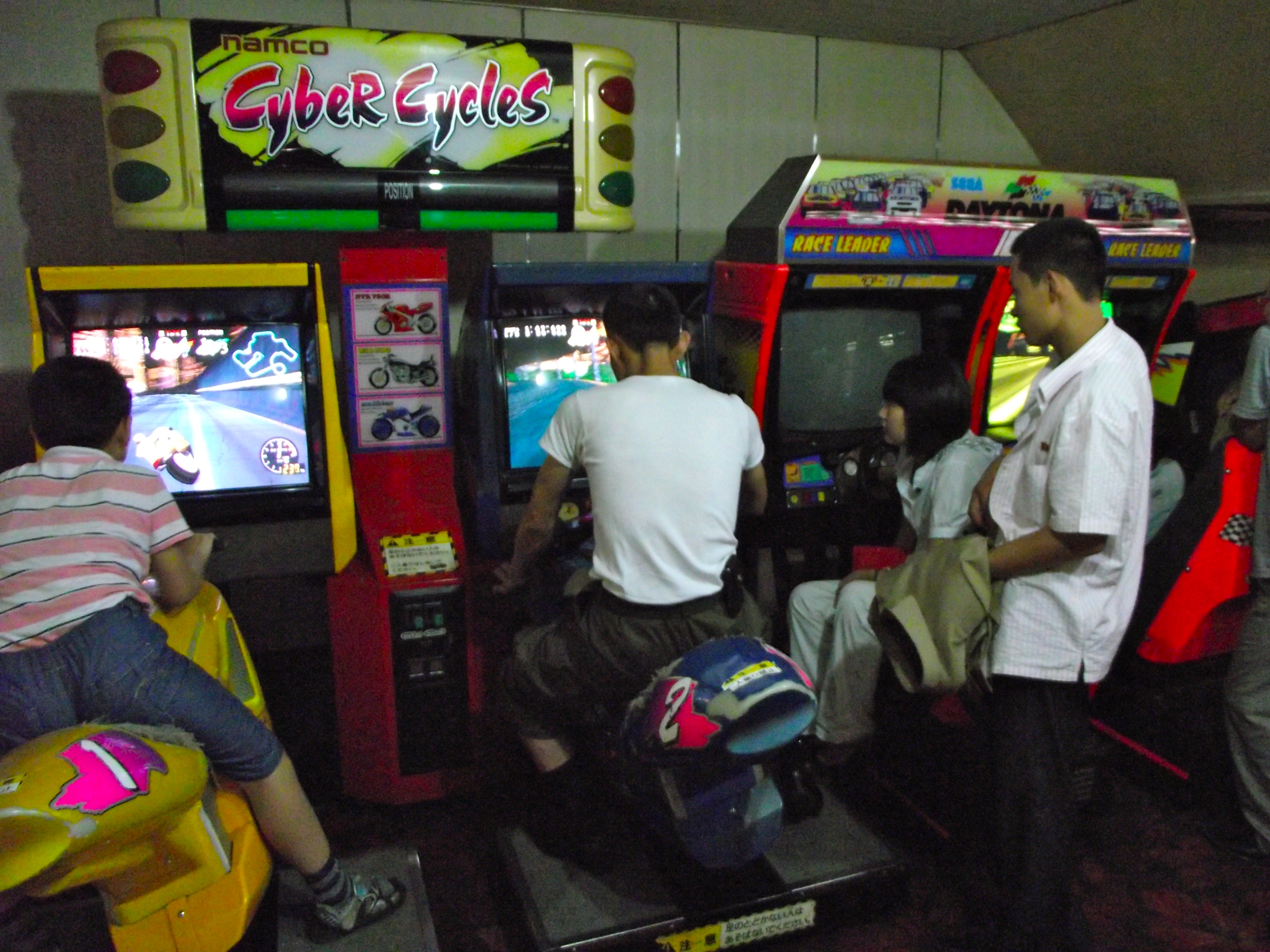
A Cyber Cycles and Daytona USA arcade cabinet at the Pyongyang Gold Lane bowling alley

Amusement arcades were the first way that video games became widely available to North Koreans, having first appeared in the country in the early 1990s. Arcades are common in the country. Popular arcade game genres include light-gun shooter games, pinball machines, and virtual reality games. The Pyongyang Gold Lane is a bowling alley that has foreign arcade cabinets like Cyber Cycles and Daytona USA available to play. The Rungra People's Pleasure Ground also has foreign arcade games such as Monaco GP and Let's Go Jungle.

== Mobile games ==
Mobile gaming is popular in North Korea, and most people in Pyongyang own smartphones. According to a 2021 estimate by the South Korean organization Korea Institute for National Unification, around 23% of North Koreans own a smartphone. In large cities such as Pyongyang, there are physical stores that sell apps and games for people to install onto their phones. Smartphones in North Korea cannot access the Internet, but rather access the Kwangmyong, North Korea's intranet service. North Korean phones run a modified version of an Android operating system. This operating system restricts users from downloading unapproved software or viewing unsanctioned media.

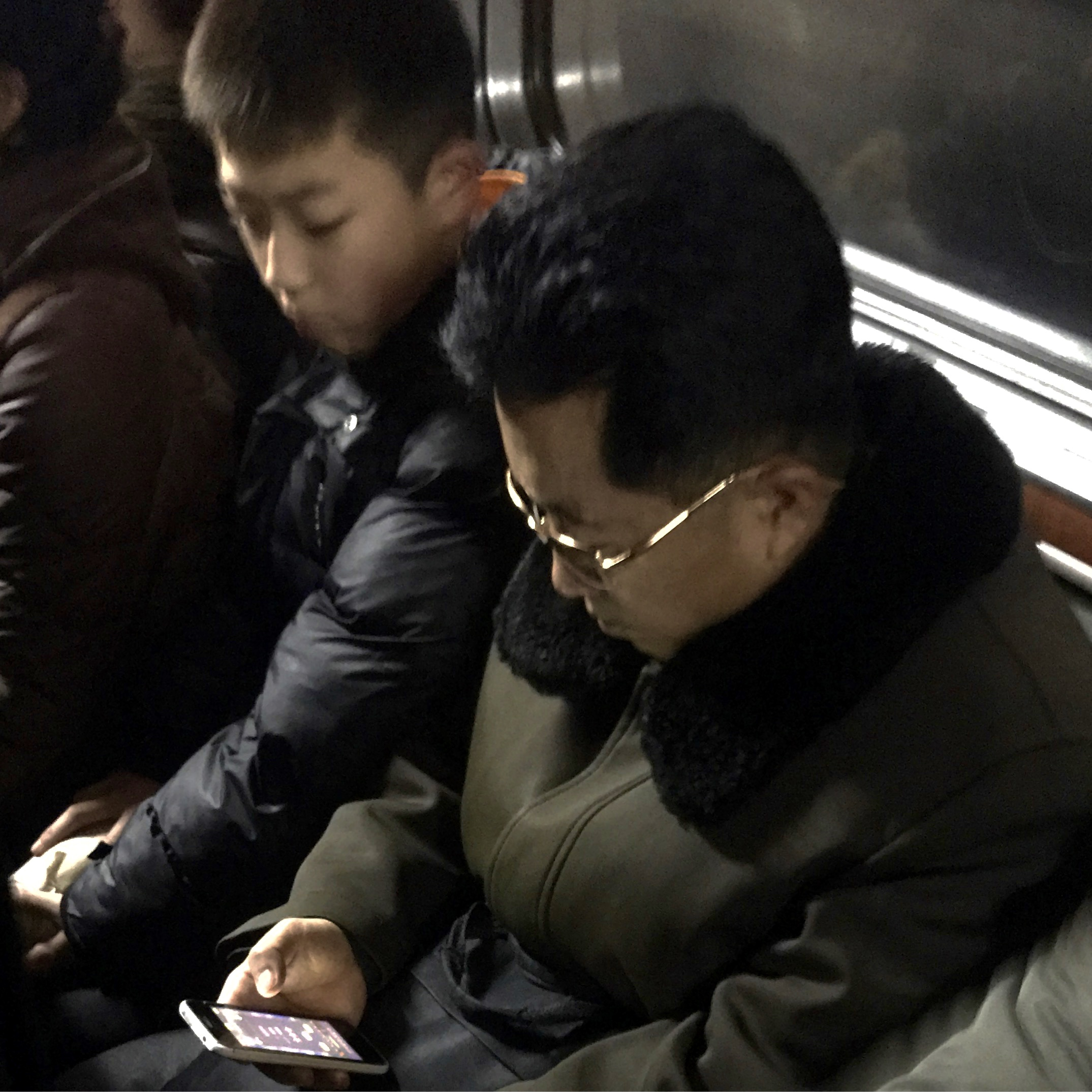
A man playing a mobile game on the Pyongyang Metro

In 2014, a quiz game app called Strength (힘) that was developed at Kim Il Sung University reportedly sold 1 million copies. The success of the game caused increased investment in North Korean game development. In 2022, a South Korean research institute called the North Korea ICT Research Association (북한ICT연구회) estimated based on interviews with around 10 North Korean defectors that there were 250 mobile games available in a North Korean app store called "My Road Companion 4.3" (나의길동무 4.3).

North Korean mobile games are often bootleg versions of foreign games like Clash of Clans, Angry Birds, and Bejeweled. Domestically produced games also exist, such as a strategy game called Imjin Fatherland War 1.0 (임진조국전쟁 1.0), a shooter game called Tiger Special Forces (호랑이 특전대), and educational games such as Mysterious Dice (신비한 주사위) and School Trip (수학여행). King of Scoring 2019 is a mobile football game that allows players to play as Cristiano Ronaldo. Nosotek is a Western-funded North Korean video game studio that has developed mobile games based on Western films like The Big Lebowski and the Men in Black series, which have been published in the West by News Corp.

The North Korean government has produced propaganda films against problematic smartphone use and video game addiction.

== PC games ==
According to a 2018 survey of 8,500 North Korean households conducted by UNICEF, 18.7% of households owned a computer, and 1.4% of households could access the North Korean intranet. Illegally acquired foreign video games, typically shared on USB flash drives, are popular among urban youth. A North Korean defector who entered South Korea in 2019 claimed that North Korean police did not generally view the playing of foreign video games as a significant issue; they even viewed it as less serious than the consumption of foreign videos or music. They claimed that, if one were to be caught playing foreign video games, they could bribe police officers to avoid harsher punishment.

The most popular PC video game is Counter-Strike. Although online matches cannot be played, it is still popular to play against bots or in LAN. Other popular PC games played in North Korea have included Grand Theft Auto V, FIFA Online, Command & Conquer: Red Alert, Age of Empires, DotA, and SimCity. Because most North Koreans do not have access to personal computers, computer cafés were popular places for gaming in Pyongyang in the late 1990s. According to Yonhap News Agency, computer cafés began to be granted permission to operate officially beginning on July 1, 2002. One such facility in Chongjin, documented in 2005, required a monthly membership fee of 20,000 North Korean won per month; by comparison, a typical North Korean person's salary was around 2,500 won per month. The business allowed access to the North Korean intranet and video games produced in North Korea and China. The download statistics page of the video game storefront Steam recorded only a single point of traffic from the entire country since 2013. PC Gamer suggested this to be "North Korea's only Steam user."

In 2012, Nosotek was commissioned by Koryo Tours to create Pyongyang Racer, a browser-based racing video game that is marketed towards Western tourists. It was inspired by retro arcade racing games. Hunting Yankee is a North Korean first-person shooter game about shooting American soldiers.

In 2025, the North Korean government began to develop a computer gaming center in a facility with room for 300 PCs. In November 2025, images inside the gaming center were posted online and showed gaming stations equipped with high-end gaming PCs, monitors and headsets from the brand Republic of Gamers, which is a gaming PC brand of the Taiwanese company Asus. Games available at the center include entries from franchises such as Resident Evil, Counter Strike, Dota, Call of Duty, Command & Conquer: Red Alert, Warcraft, Starcraft, Ace Combat, The Last of Us, Crysis, and Halo.

== Home consoles ==
The PlayStation was available in North Korea in the 1990s, and was played by Kim Jong Un in his youth.

Beginning in the 1990s, foreign home video game consoles like the Famicom and PlayStation gained popularity in North Korea. Many were brought into the country by North Koreans traveling abroad, (Note: Since the 1990s North Korean famine, it has not been uncommon for items to be smuggled across the northern border with China.) and others were sent as gifts by Zainichi Koreans to their relatives in North Korea. They were also available in department stores but were unaffordable for most North Koreans. Many games illegally imported for home consoles in the 1990s were played in temporary gaming centers operated in private homes to avoid government surveillance.

According to interviews with former classmates of Kim Jong Un by journalist Anna Fifield, Kim Jong Un played basketball-themed sports video games on the PlayStation when he lived in Switzerland in his youth.

The Moranbong is a home video game console released on North Korean markets in 2019. The Moranbong is a localized version of the Subor G80 (also known as the Cdragon Cassidy G80), a Chinese console that uses a motion controller like the Wii and a camera like the Kinect. It runs on the Android operating system. The Moranbong is sold pre-equipped with sports games, fitness games, educational games, and shooter games.

== See also ==
- Mass media in North Korea
- Video games in South Korea
