= Felix Abt =

Swiss businessman

Felix Abt (born 15 January 1955, Switzerland) is a Swiss business affairs specialist on North Korea and Vietnam.

Abt was one of the first foreign entrepreneurs to seek to do business in contemporary North Korea, where he lived between 2002 and 2009, and developing and operating businesses. He co-founded and directed the Pyongyang Business School, where he was involved in capacity building related to business administration for senior executives of North Korean government agencies and enterprises.

Abt published a memoir titled A Capitalist in North Korea: My Seven Years in the Hermit Kingdom in 2014.

== Career ==
Before he rejoined the ABB Group in 2002 and moved to North Korea, Felix Abt had been working from 1990 for companies in countries and regions such as Vietnam, the Middle East and Africa.

In 2002, Abt was appointed resident Group Representative in North Korea by the Swiss-Swedish ABB Group, an electrical power and automation technologies company. On 19 May 2003, he signed a memorandum of understanding on the implementation of a large high-tension power grid project by ABB with North Korea's Ministry of Power and Coal Industries, in presence of the Swiss foreign minister, the Swedish ambassador to the DPRK, and the Minister of Power and Coal Industries, "in an effort to solve North Korea's serious problems in the power sector, highlighted by its worn-out generation and transmission facilities".

In late 2003, Abt became an agent of several multinational corporations in business fields such as infrastructure (ABB), mining (Sandvik) and textiles (Dystar) on whose behalf he realized multi-million USD sales.

Abt also acted from October 2005 to February 2009 as managing director of the Pyongsu Joint Venture Company, the first foreign-invested joint venture in the pharmaceutical field. During this period it became the first North Korean pharmaceutical factory to reach international quality standard (called Good Manufacturing Practice or GMP) certified by the World Health Organization and the first North Korean company to win contracts against international competitors. It also set up its own pharmacy chain in the country.

Abt was the founding president of the European Business Association (EBA) in Pyongyang, set up on 28 April 2005, a de facto European Chamber of Commerce. Among other things, the EBA has organized the participation of European companies at trade fairs in North Korea and has been hosting visiting delegations such as members from the European Union parliament and EU ambassadors to the DPRK. As EBA's president, Abt strongly lobbied against economic sanctions by Western powers hurting legitimate foreign business activities in North Korea.

Concurrently, Abt established the Pyongyang Business School. The school has organized regular cycles of postgraduate seminars on strategic management and business administration for senior executive officers of North Korean ministries and enterprises from 2004.

Together with Volker Eloesser, Abt was a co-founder/investor of the first foreign-invested software joint venture by the name of Nosotek, established in 2007.

Abt set up an online art gallery introducing North Korean painters and promoting North Korean fine art in 2008.

In 2009 Abt left Pyongyang for Vietnam, but is still involved in North Korean issues. In 2014, he published a book about his experiences, A Capitalist in North Korea.

== Controversy ==
Because of his investment strategies in North Korea, Abt has been called a "controversial figure" and a member of a "secretive group of Western investors" in North Korea. The investors, including Abt, use a strategy called "China Plus One" where a company "can still claim that the products were 'Made in China," says Abt, if less than 50 percent of the product is made in North Korea. For example, the highest-paid factory workers in North Korea earn $75/month compared to the lowest paid in China at $270/month. The product can still be labeled "Made in China", and thus exportable to countries around the world when using the "China Plus One" strategy. This strategy has been criticized for exploiting laborers in North Korea who experience human rights violations.

Steven Borowiec, who covers the Korea's for the Los Angeles Times, reported that "Abt deflects questions of human rights by claiming that he is neither a human rights expert nor a politician. That may be true, but Abt must be aware that one need not be either of those things to spot something that is morally objectionable."
