= Video games in Korea =

Video games in Korea may refer to:

- Video games in North Korea
- Video games in South Korea
