= IQOO 3 =

Android-based smartphone

iQOO 3
- Brand: iQOO
- Manufacturer: Vivo
- Type: Smartphone
- First released: February 25, 2020; 6 years ago
- Successor: iQOO 5
- Compatible networks: 2G, 3G, 4G, 5G
- Form factor: Slate
- Dimensions: 158.5 mm (6.24 in) H 74.9 mm (2.95 in) W 9.2 mm (0.36 in)
- Weight: 214.5 g (7.57 oz)
- Operating system: International Original: Android 10; Upgradable: Android 12 China Original: Android 10 Upgradable: Android 13
- System-on-chip: Qualcomm Snapdragon 865
- CPU: Snapdragon: Octa-core (1x2.84 GHz, 3x2.42 GHz and 4x1.8 GHz) Kryo 585
- GPU: Adreno 650
- Memory: 6 GB, 8 GB, 12 GB RAM
- Storage: 128 GB, 256 GB, UFS 3.1
- Removable storage: non-expandable
- SIM: Dual SIM (Nano-SIM, dual stand-by)
- Battery: 4400 mAh
- Charging: Fast charging 55W, 50% in 15 min (advertised) Super Flash Charge 2.0
- Rear camera: Photo: 48 MP, f/1.8, (wide), 1/2.0", 0.8 μm, PDAF, gyro-EIS + 13 MP, f/2.5, 50mm (telephoto), PDAF, 2x optical zoom + 13 MP, f/2.2, 120˚, 16mm (ultrawide), AF, + 2 MP, f/2.4, (depth); Video: LED flash, auto-HDR, panorama, 4K@30/60fps, 1080p@30/60/240fps, HDR, gyro-EIS
- Front camera: 32 MP, f/2.5, auto-HDR; 1080p@30fps
- Display: 1080×2400 1080p 20:9 ratio (~409 ppi) Super AMOLED capacitive touchscreen, Gorilla Glass 6, HDR10+, 60 Hz refresh rate
- Sound: 3.5 Jack
- Connectivity: Wi-Fi IEEE 802.11 a/b/g/n/ac/6, Wi-Fi Direct, hotspot Bluetooth 5.1, A2DP, LE, aptX HD
- Data inputs: A-GPS, GLONASS, GALILEO, BDS
- Model: V1955A (China); I1927, I1928 (India)
- Website: https://www.iqoo.com/in/products/iqoo3

The iQOO 3 is an Android-based smartphone designed, developed and marketed by Vivo owned iQOO as a part of its iQOO gaming smartphone series. This phone was announced on February 25, 2019. The iQOO 3 was introduced as a premium segment smartphone with a special focus on gaming.

== Design ==
The slender 9.2 mm body of iQOO 3, the glossy glass sandwich finish stands out all on its own. It is available in Volcano Orange, Tornado Black, Quantum Silver color. It is available with FULL HD+ Super AMOLED, HDR10 with display 800 nits brightness and a punch hole for the front camera. The screen supports 180 Hz Super Touch Response rate suitable for the gaming phones. The additional features which also includes under display optical fingerprint sensor along with face recognition for unlocking the phone & quad camera for photography.

== Specification ==
=== Hardware ===
iQOO 3 is a smartphone with a slate-type factor form, the dimensions of iQOO 3 are 158.5 x 74.9 x 9.2 mm (6.24 x 2.95 x 0.36 in) weighing 214.5 g (7.58 oz). The device is equipped with dual sim with support for GSM, HSPA and LTE & supporting major 5G bands for connectivity and Wi-Fi 802.11 a/b/g/n/ac/6, dual-band, Wi-Fi Direct, hotspot with Bluetooth 5.1, A2DP, LE, aptX HD support. For navigation GPS with A-GPS, GLONASS, Beidou, GALILEO are supported.

It has a 6.44 inches, 100.1 cm^{2} (~84.3% screen-to-body ratio) diagonal Super AMOLED, HDR10+ touchscreen, the screen supports 800 nits of brightness with peak brightness of up to 1200 nits. The Super AMOLED also sports smalle. The 4400 mAh lithium polymer non-removable battery with fast-charging support for up to 65 W charging.

The chipset is powered by a Qualcomm SM8250 Snapdragon 865 5G (7 nm+) Octa-core (1x2.84 GHz Kryo 585 & 3x2.42 GHz Kryo 585 & 4x1.8 GHz Kryo 585) powered by Adreno 650 GPU. The phone comes in multiple configuration of 128 GB 6 GB RAM(Chine Only), 128 GB 8 GB RAM, 128 GB 12 GB RAM, 256 GB 8 GB RAM, 256 GB 12 GB RAM & it has UFS 3.1 storage.

The iQOO 3 features 5 camera setup single 32 MP camera at the front for the selfie & quad camera setup at the back. The main camera sensor is powered by 48 MP, f/1.8, (wide), 1/2.0", 0.8 μm, PDAF, supported by telephoto lens of 13 MP, f/2.5, 50 mm (telephoto), PDAF, 2x optical zoom and ultrawide lens of 13 MP, f/2.2, 120˚, 16 mm (ultrawide), AF. It also has 2 MP, f/2.4, (depth) depth sensor helping to capture better portrait pictures. The iQOO 3 is capable of recording 4K videos at 30/60 fps, full HD 1080p 30 fps. The main sensor has gyro-EIS support for video stability and can also record 720p at 240 fps.

For enhanced gaming effect the phone also has the Monster Touch Buttons, which are two pressure-sensitive buttons on the side frame of the phone. This helped users to achieve quick multi-finger operations in the game. Monster touch buttons also enabled better grip, wider adaptation, comfort and reliable quality. 4D vibration can simulate the recoil when shooting and the vibration of the steering wheel when driving, making the game experience more realistic.

=== Software ===
iQOO had launched the iQOO3 with Android 10 with iQOO UI 1.0. The smartphone received the Android 11 based iQOO UI update in the year 2021 and the Android 12-based on same iQOO UI started rolling out in March & April 2022.
