= Indonesia–North Korea relations =

- Indonesia: North Korea

Diplomatic mission
- Indonesian Embassy, Pyongyang: North Korean Embassy, Jakarta

Indonesia–North Korea relations refers to bilateral relations between Indonesia and North Korea. The two countries established diplomatic relations on 16 April 1964. Indonesia is one of the very few countries that still tries to maintain cordial relations with North Korea, despite the widespread international sanctions and resulting isolation imposed on North Korea, compounded with the negative reputation of its human rights, nuclear weapons and ballistic missile programs and Indonesia's publicly more robust engagement and partnership with South Korea.

Both nations share a relationship that dates back to their respective founders; Sukarno and Kim Il Sung both considered the other a friend. Both nations are part of the Non-Aligned Movement. Indonesia has an embassy in Pyongyang which closed in 2021 amid the COVID-19 pandemic, but reopened in July 2025. North Korea has an embassy in Jakarta.

According to a 2017 BBC World Service Poll, 46% of Indonesians view North Korea's influence negatively, with only 17% expressing a positive view.

== History ==
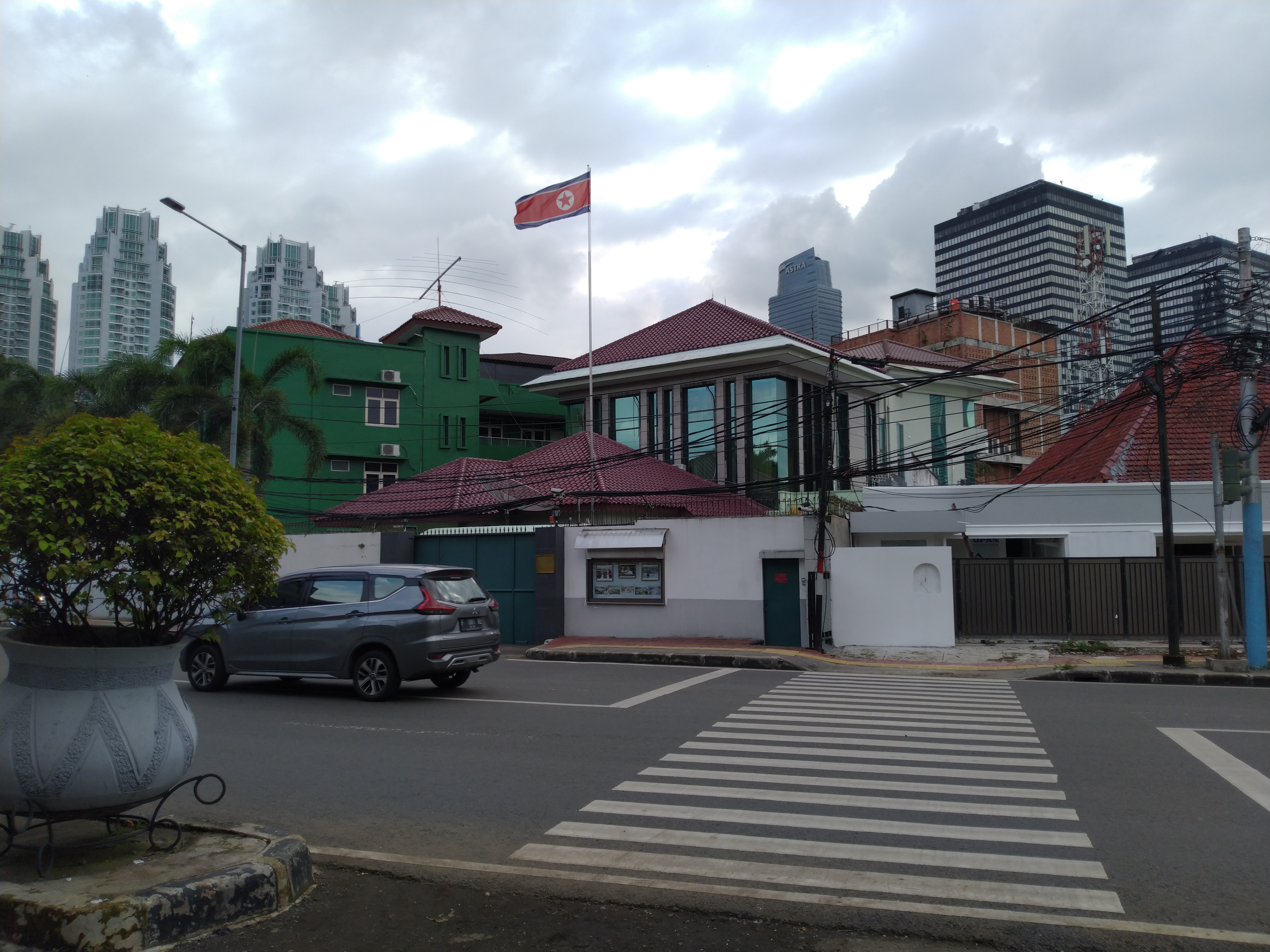
The North Korean embassy compound in Jakarta, 2020

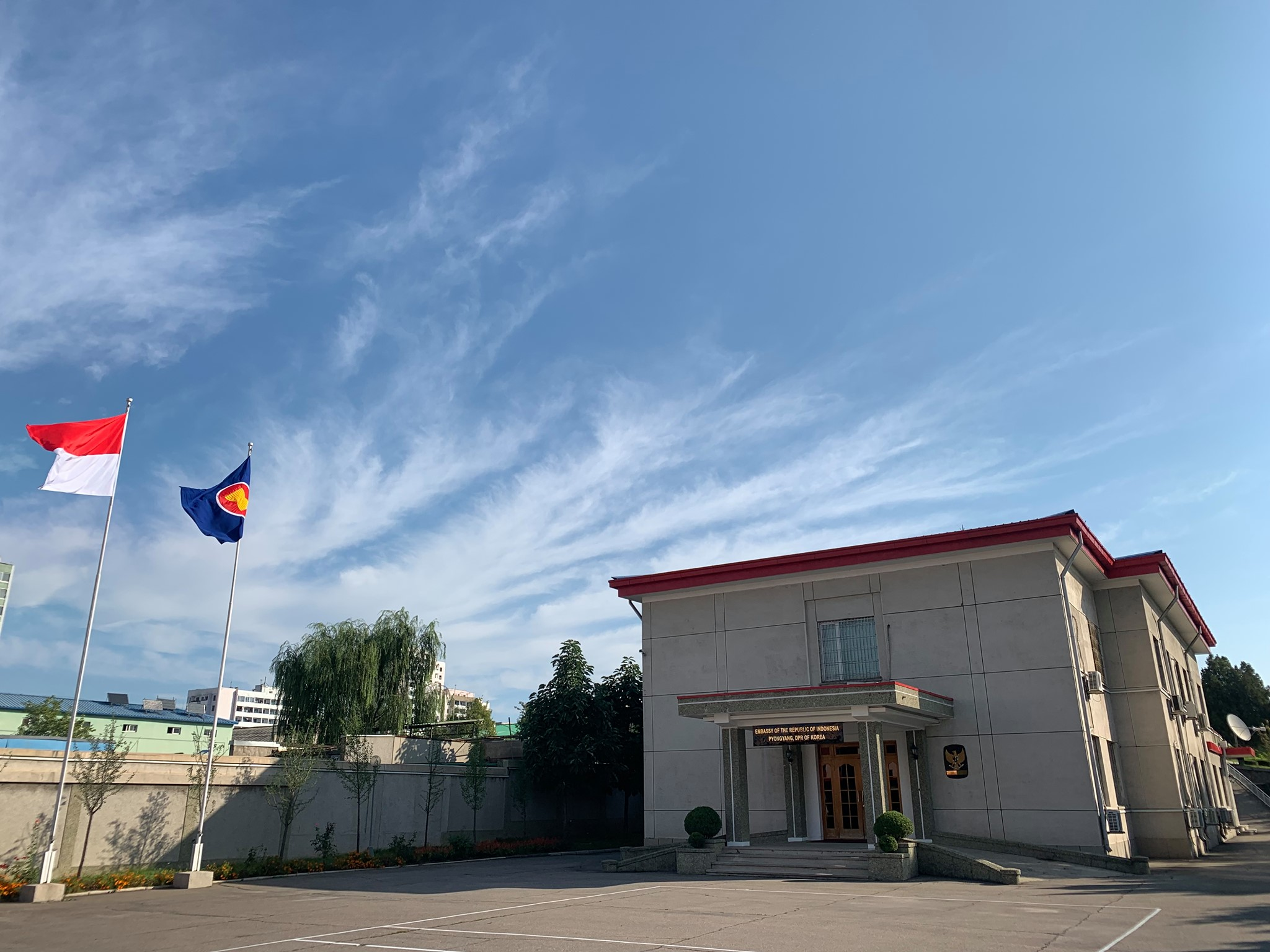
Embassy of Indonesia, Pyongyang, North Korea

Indonesia had already maintained informal relations since 1956. In 1956, Purbodiningrat and his delegation visited North Korea. In 1959, North Korea opened a trade office in Jakarta. On the following year, North Korea accepted the first two Indonesian students who won government scholarships, Gatot Wilotikto and Waloejo Sedjati. Indonesia officially established diplomatic relations with North Korea on 17 June 1961. On 30 December 1961, Indonesia inaugurated its consular office in Pyongyang.

Indonesia is the source of the floral symbol of the Eternal President of the Democratic People's Republic of Korea, Kim Il Sung, exemplifying the close relations of both countries' founding fathers. President Sukarno named a cultivar of orchid Kimilsungia during Kim Il Sung's state visit in 1965. The violet Kimilsungia orchid has since become a symbol of the late Juche leader, being used in official floral arrangements representing the North Korean state.

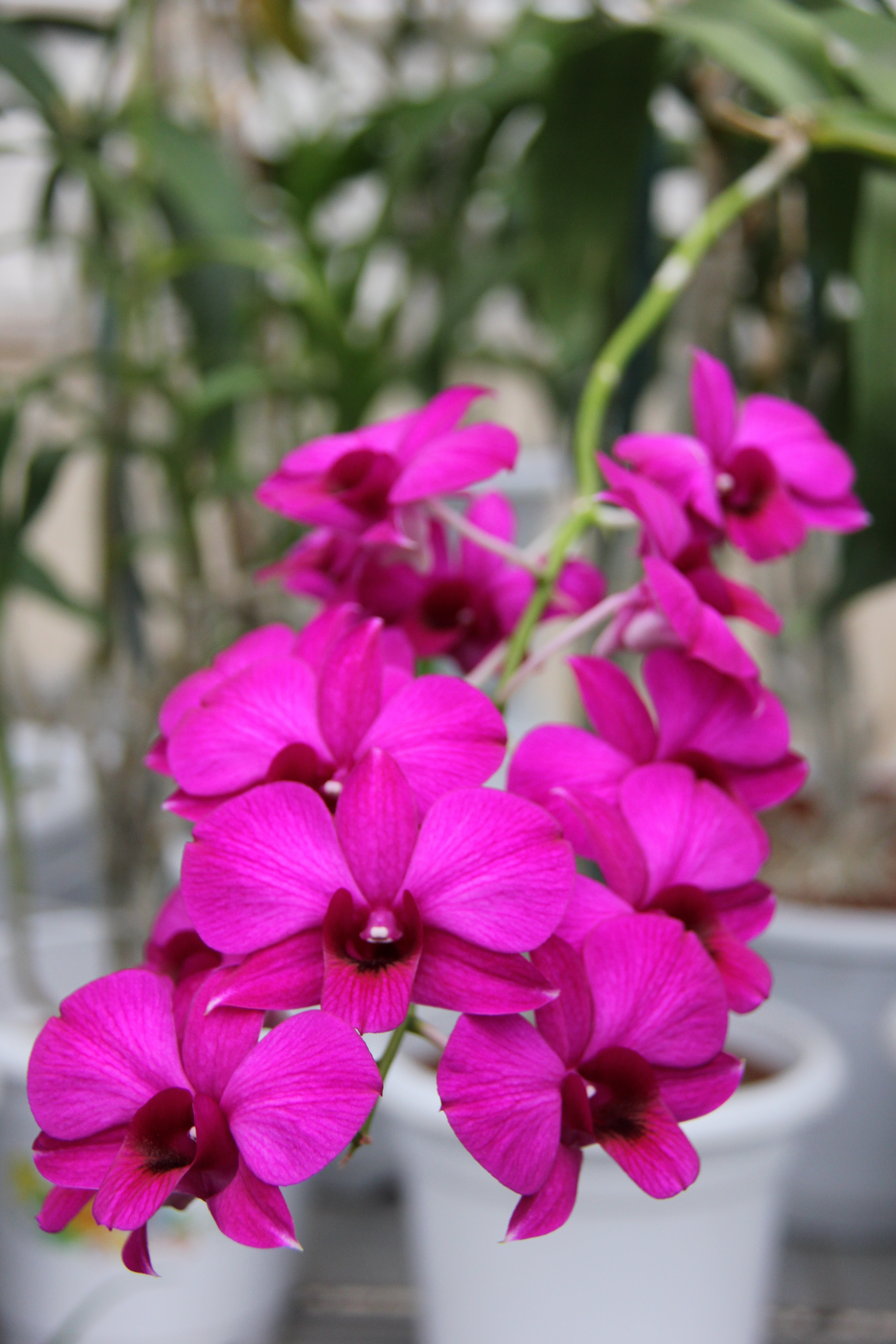
Kimilsungia flower

However, diplomatic relations were cut off until 1972 following the overthrown of the Sukarno regime. Under the leadership of Suharto, Indonesia discretely moved closer to the United States and South Korea, even as Jakarta remained the headquarters of the Non-Aligned Movement. Despite the newfound tilt, Indonesia never formally severed ties with North Korea.

Indonesia's historic ties to North Korea were reaffirmed under president Megawati Sukarnoputri, the daughter of Sukarno, who visited Pyongyang in 2002 to build relations with-then North Korean leader Kim Jong Il, in the spirit of the friendship their fathers enjoyed.

In 2002, the President of the Presidium of the Supreme People's Assembly of the Democratic People's Republic of Korea, Kim Yong-nam, met president Megawati Sukarnoputri. In 2005 Kim Yong-nam again visited Indonesia to attend the Asian-African Conference Commemorative event. In May 2012, President Kim Yong-nam paid an official visit to Jakarta. The visit prompted Indonesian activists for Human Rights and Democracy to call on President Susilo Bambang Yudhoyono to help push for the democratisation and respect for human rights in North Korea.

== Contemporary relations ==
Indonesia continues to maintain its relations with North Korea despite North Korea's poor human rights record and international isolation. Indonesia still continues to engage North Korea as it believes in dialogue, and maintains that there is no point in isolating or containing the DPRK.

=== Cultural ===
Indonesia participates in the annual Kimilsungia Flower Festival and biennially at the April Spring Friendship Art Festival (ASFAF) and International Film Festival (PIFF) in Pyongyang. Additionally, joint activities between the Indonesian Embassy in Pyongyang and the Committee for Cultural Relations with Foreign Countries (CCRFC), the Association for Friendship and Foreign Affairs North Korea is also continued.

The North Korean government operated the Pyongyang restaurant in Jakarta; serving North Korean cuisine, promoting the image of North Korea, as well as being a source of foreign currency for the North Korean government. The Pyongyang restaurant crew were all North Korean. The restaurant was closed after the death of Kim Jong Un's stepbrother.

North Korea sent 2 (two) diplomats to attend the 11th International Training Course for Mid-Career Diplomats organised by the Indonesian Ministry of Education and Training Centre in Jakarta on 20 October to 3 November 2013.

Indonesia invited the North Korean leader Kim Jong Un to attend the opening ceremony of the 2018 Asian Games in Jakarta in August, following a similar invitation to South Korean President Moon Jae-in. At the ceremony, athletes from South Korea and North Korea paraded under one flag, that of "Korea". Athletes from both countries wore uniforms in white and light blue; the colors found in the Korean Unification Flag.

In 2020, President Joko Widodo sent a basket of flowers to North Korean leader Kim Jong Un to mark the 72nd anniversary of the Democratic People's Republic of Korea (DPRK), with Jokowi reiterating his willingness to bolster cooperation between the two countries “for peace and progress in the region and beyond.” North Korean leader Kim Jong Un sent a congratulatory message to President Jokowi to mark Indonesia's 75th anniversary on 17 August 2020.

=== Economic relations ===
In 2012, through the World Food Programme, the Indonesian government provided assistance worth $2 million in the form of 1,465 tonnes of palm oil. Palm oil is a versatile additive for food; in Indonesia it is most often used as cooking oil or margarine.

In the period of January – October 2014 the volume of trade between the two countries recorded only 2.8 million US dollars; down 82.24 percent over the same period in 2013. Subsequently, the Indonesian economy team planned a visit to the DPRK, and its counterpart planned a counter-trip, which is expected to increase the volume of trade and improve bilateral relations between Indonesia – DPRK.

In 2015, North Korea's imports to Indonesia amounted to US$1.41 million, the most exported commodity being vegetable residue consisting 42 percent of the value priced at US$597 thousand. In return, North Korea also imported soap from Indonesia worth US$600 thousand.

According to data from the Indonesian Ministry of Trade, the total trade volume between the two countries amounted to US$3.26 million in 2019, a significant increase from the previous year's total value of $964,000. Indonesia and North Korea total trade reaches US$342.9 thousand, while trade relations since 2014 to 2019 has made Indonesia imbalance of trade significantly in non-oil and gas export import.

== See also ==
- Indonesia–South Korea relations
- Indonesia–Japan relations
- Indonesia–China relations
- Indonesia–Taiwan relations
