= Duan Yongping =

Chinese-American entrepreneur (born 1961)

- Born: 段永平; 4 January 1961 (age 65); Nanchang, Jiangxi, China
- Citizenship: United States
- Education: Zhejiang University (BE); Renmin University (MS); China Europe International Business School (MBA)
- Organization: BBK Electronics
- Known for: Founder of BBK Electronics, Oppo, Vivo, OnePlus, IQOO and Realme

Duan Yongping (Chinese: 段永平; pinyin: Duàn Yǒngpíng; born 1961) is a Chinese-American billionaire entrepreneur and electrical engineer. He was the director of the Subor Electronics Industry Corporation and founded BBK Electronics Group (also the former Chairman). Duan's net worth was estimated at $20 billion, according to a 2026 Valuesider evaluation.

== Early life and education ==
Born on 10 March 1961 in Nanchang, Jiangxi, China, Duan entered Zhejiang University in 1978, majoring in wireless electronics engineering. After graduation, he became a teacher at the adult education center of the Beijing Radio Tube Factory (now BOE Technology). Later, he studied at Renmin University, where he majored in econometrics. He also studied at China Europe International Business School as an EMBA student for two years.

== Career ==
=== Subor era ===
In 1989, he was appointed director of Nihwa Electronics Factory in Zhongshan by the parent Yihua Group. Over six years, he transformed the business's fortunes. The company only had 20 workers including himself. They only had 3000 RMB cash but owed 2 million RMB debts. But after Duan's struggle, it quickly became top producer of the "learning computer" (Chinese: 学习机). Branded as Subor (Xiao Ba Wang, Chinese: 小霸王) it was very successful at producing famiclones for the Chinese and other markets. It also produced video-game facilities, which made a profit of more than 200 million RMB during 1994–1995.

=== Founding of BBK ===
On 28 August 1995, Duan resigned from Subor, and founded BBK Electronics Industrial Group in Dongguan, Guangdong Province. Its main product was DVD players. It is a well-known brand in cell phone, telephone and stereo devices.

From 2002 to 2004, he was the second largest individual shareholder (with more than 10% at peak) of NetEase after William Ding Lei.

== Personal life and philanthropy ==
Together with William Ding Lei, Duan donated US$40 million to Zhejiang University in September 2006. This is the biggest endowment in recent years for higher education in mainland China.

In 2007, Duan spent US$620,100 to have lunch with Warren Buffett ("Power Lunch with Warren Buffett"), the money was donated to the Glide Foundation. Due to his success in the stock market, and philanthropic activities, he has been called the "Chinese Buffett".

Duan and Xin Liu co-founded the Enlight Foundation in 2004. Following their divorce in 2013, the foundation has been run by Liu. Liu is also the director and co-founder of Xinhe Foundation (previously Xinping Foundation) in China.
