= Kim Chaek University of Technology =

University in North Korea

Coordinates: 39°0′10″N 125°44′47″E

- 김책공업종합대학
- Former name: Pyongyang College of Technology
- Established: 1951; 75 years ago
- Administrative staff: 2,000
- Students: 10,000
- Location: Pyongyang, North Korea
- Website: www.kut.edu.kp

- Kim Chaek University of Technology
- Hangul: 김책공업종합대학
- Hanja: 金策工業綜合大學
- RR: Gim Chaek gongeop jonghap daehak
- MR: Kim Ch'aek kongŏp chonghap taehak

Kim Chaek University of Technology (Korean: 김책공업종합대학) is a university in North Korea, on the banks of the Taedong River in the Kyogu-dong third-level division in Pyongyang. It is named after General Kim Chaek.

The university's programs in nuclear reactors, nuclear electronics, nuclear fuel and nuclear engineering specialize in training researchers and technical personnel. Graduates are reportedly posted to the Yŏngbyŏn Nuclear Research Center or to nuclear facilities in Pakch'ŏn-kun.

It is considered one of the top universities of the country and described by some as the MIT of North Korea.

== History ==
Kim Chaek University of Technology was originally part of Kim Il Sung University before it was established as the Pyongyang College of Technology in 1948. In 1951, during the Korean War, the college's name was changed to Kim Chaek College of Technology.

In 1988, the college was elevated to a university. Between 1981 and 1993, a large-scale construction program doubled the size of the campus to its present 400,000m^{2}.

== Academics ==
The university has 18 departments and about 80 programs, about 10,000 students and 2,000 staff. There are 10 research institutes and one graduate school. There are 54 laboratories and a library with about 600,000 volumes. The campus has a total area of 400,000 square meters.

The Science and Education Department under the Central Committee of the Workers' Party of Korea exercises overall supervision, but the Department of Higher Education in the Ministry of Education manages administrative affairs. There are education bureaus under the people's committees in every city and/or province that contribute to the formation of education policy, and the local education bureau could provide some input for the school.

As of 6 January 2007, Ri Won Chil is the vice president.

In 2012, Nosotek cooperated with students from the Kim Chaek University of Technology to develop Pyongyang Racer, a racing video game released by the Koryo Tours travel agency to promote tourism in North Korea.

Top-performing students from Kim Chaek University of Technology are recruited by the Reconnaissance General Bureau (RGB), a department of the North Korean government which manages its cyber capabilities, to work as code-breakers and foreign hackers in order to acquire money for the government.

== Achievements ==
In 2019, the university placed 8th in 2019's International Collegiate Programming Contest (ICPC). This was their first and only time participating in the ICPC.

== Notable alumni ==
- Park Jin Hyok, a North Korean programmer and hacker
- Park Sang-hak, a North Korean activist
- Gatot Wilotikto, an Indonesian researcher and exile who lived in North Korea for 50 years

== See also ==
- List of universities in North Korea
- Education in North Korea
