= Kim Gwang-Hun =

North Korean film director (born 1963)

Kim Gwang-Hun; 김광훈
- Born: 1963 (age 62–63)

Kim Gwang-Hun (Korean: 김광훈; born 1963) is a North Korean film director.

== Career ==
After graduating from the Pyongyang University of Dramatic and Cinematic Arts, Kim began his career in 1985 as an assistant director at the Korean April 25th Film Studio. He directed his first feature film, Unforgettable Man, in 2002.

In 2012, Kim co-directed Comrade Kim Goes Flying alongside British director Nicholas Bonner and Belgian director Anja Daelemans. The film marked the first collaboration between North Korean and European filmmakers since the 1980s.

== Filmography ==
Year	Title	Notes
2001	My Wish	—N/a
2002	Unforgettable Man	—N/a
2008	Watch Us	—N/a
2009	Great Bear	—N/a
2012	Comrade Kim Goes Flying	Co-directed with Anja Daelemans and Nicholas Bonner
