= Gatot Wilotikto =

Indonesian researcher and translator

- Born: 18 November 1936 (age 89); Dutch East Indies
- Education: Kim Chaek University of Technology
- Occupations: Researcher; Interpreter
- Known for: Indonesian exile in North Korea
- Spouse: O Kwang Mi
- Children: 3

Gatot Wilotikto (born 18 November 1936) is an Indonesian researcher, translator, and exile who lived in North Korea for 50 years.

== Early life and education ==
Gatot was born on 18 November 1936. Before going to North Korea, he studied biology at Padjadjaran University.

== Life in North Korea ==
=== Journey to North Korea ===
Together with Waloejo Sedjati, Gatot received a scholarship offer from the North Korean government to study in North Korea. They accepted the offer and departed from Jakarta to Pyongyang on 11 November 1960. The journey to Pyongyang took seven days, transiting Singapore, Yangon, Kunming, and Beijing.

Upon arriving in Beijing, Gatot and Waloejo continued their journey to Pyongyang by train. When the train arrived in North Korea, they were given a warm welcome from the Socialist Patriotic Youth League. Gatot and Waloejo were accompanied by guides and translators from the youth league on their way to Pyongyang. They arrived in Pyongyang on 18 November 1960, and were greeted with military music performed by a marching band. The Korean Youth League delegation presented them with red paper flowers and warm clothing bearing an inscription from Marshal Kim Il Sung. It was the first time Gatot and Waloejo had seen snow.

=== College years in North Korea ===
Upon arriving in Pyongyang, Gatot majored in electrical engineering at the Kim Chaek University of Technology. During his early college years, he often traveled to Beijing to renew his passport.

In October 1961, he served as Indonesia's representative when the Indonesian Cultural Delegation visited Pyongyang. In the same month, he requested the Korean Democratic Youth League to organize a celebration for Youth Pledge Day. The request was accepted, and Youth Pledge Day was celebrated in Pyongyang by the Democratic Youth League. The event was also attended by delegations of foreign students.

When Indonesia's Ambassador-at-large, Supeni Pudjobuntoro, visited Pyongyang to promote GANEFO, Gatot served as her interpreter. He also welcomed and shook hands with Sukarno during his visit to Pyongyang in November 1964.

After the 30 September Movement (G30S) incident in 1965, Gatot followed Indonesian news through Radio ABC broadcasts. Together with Waloejo, he visited Beijing in July or August 1966 to meet with the Central Committee of the PKI in order to obtain more information about the situation in Indonesia and to offer advice to them. However, they received bad news from the PKI.

In 1966, a special research team visited Pyongyang and requested that Indonesian students come to the Indonesian Embassy in Pyongyang to undergo a screening process aimed at knowing their political views. Gatot refused the summons because he feared he would be arrested during the screening process or upon his return to Indonesia. As a result, his passport and citizenship were revoked, leaving him stateless and cutting off contact with his family.

Despite having his Indonesian citizenship and passport revoked, the North Korean government issued Gatot a local identification card and extended his visa. He also continued to receive a stipend. He successfully graduated from university in April 1967 and later completed his postgraduate and doctoral studies in North Korea.

=== Career and post-university life in North Korea ===
After graduating from university, Gatot worked as a researcher at his alma mater. As a foreigner, he was treated better than his Korean colleagues. The North Korean government provided him with an apartment, good facilities, and a salary higher than a government minister. In addition, he received a special bulletin from the Chinese Embassy that was specifically for him. However, he was warned not to let students read it, so he would immediately put it away after reading it. He retired from his research position in 2000.

Gatot also received attention from Kim Jong Il. On 25 December 1996, Kim Jong Il organized Gatot's 60th birthday celebration and ensured that he would receive the title of Doctor of Engineering. Gatot's birthday event was covered by the Rodong Sinmun newspaper and KCTV. He also received gifts from the North Korean government. In addition, Kim Jong Il requested that Gatot be treated like a Korean because he had live among them and was loyal to the government.

Despite his stateless status, he maintained informal relations with the staff of the Indonesian Embassy in Pyongyang. In 1988, Gatot was invited again to the embassy to provide input on Indonesia–North Korea bilateral relations. Gatot began working with the Indonesian Embassy in Pyongyang in 1989. He also assisted the embassy during the visits of Ali Alatas and Hassan Wirajuda to Pyongyang.

After retiring from Kim Chaek University, Gatot worked at the Indonesian Embassy in Pyongyang, and in 2004–2005, he officially became a local staff member. As such, he accompanied Megawati and served as an interpreter during her meeting with Kim Jong Il in 2002. He also worked as an interpreter for other Indonesian politicians visiting North Korea. Having lived in North Korea for so long, his colleagues at the Indonesian Embassy called him "a walking encyclopedia of Indonesia–Korea relations."

Gatot and his family wanted to try leaving North Korea. He also wished to go to Berlin to meet his mother there. However, their attempts were repeatedly thwarted by the North Korean government. It was only during the presidency of Gus Dur that his citizenship was restored, allowing him to return to Indonesia in 2000. He and his family eventually left North Korea and moved to Indonesia in 2011 due to an uncertain future, especially for his son.

Although he returned to Indonesia, he continued working as a translator. In 2012, he served as a translator for Susilo Bambang Yudhoyono during his meeting with Kim Yong Nam.

== Personal life ==
Gatot married a North Korean woman named O Kwang Mi in November 1967, whom he first met on the street. To marry a North Korean woman, Gatot had to obtain approval from the North Korean parliament.

Gatot and O Kwang Mi have three children. In 2015, his wife faced the threat of deportation from Indonesia.

== Bibliography ==
- Hill, David.T (2022). "The Fragile Bloom of the Kimilsungia: Indonesian political exiles in North Korea". Indonesia and the Malay World. 50 (147). doi:10.1080/13639811.2022.2026620.
