= Vivo T1 =

Android-based smartphones produced by Vivo

vivo T1 (China) vivo T1x (China) vivo T1 5G (India) (iQOO Z6, vivo Y75 5G) vivo T1 44W (4G) (India) (iQOO Z6 44W) vivo T1x 4G (Malaysia) vivo T1 Pro 5G (India) (Malaysian vivo T1, iQOO Z6 Pro)

- Wallpapered front diagram of vivo T1 (China).
- Brand: Vivo Communication Technology Corporation
- Manufacturer: Vivo
- Type: Smartphone
- Series: T
- First released: T1 and T1x (China): 20 October 2021; 4 years ago; T1 5G (India): 9 February 2022; 4 years ago
- Availability by region: T1 and T1x (China): 1 November 2021; 4 years ago; T1 5G (India): 14 February 2022; 4 years ago
- Predecessor: iQOO Z5
- Successor: Vivo T2
- Compatible networks: 2G, 3G, 4G and 5G
- Form factor: Slate
- Colors: T1: Electro-light Blue, Shadow Black; T1x: Sea-salt White, Iridescent Purple, Starry Night Black; T1 5G: Starlight Black, Rainbow Fantasy
- Dimensions: T1 (China): 164.7 mm × 76.7 mm × 8.5 mm (6.48 in × 3.02 in × 0.33 in); T1x: 164 mm × 75.3 mm × 8.5 mm (6.46 in × 2.96 in × 0.33 in); T1 5G (India): 164 mm × 75.8 mm × 8.3 mm (6.46 in × 2.98 in × 0.33 in)
- Weight: T1 (China): 193 g (6.8 oz); T1x: 189 g (6.7 oz); T1 5G (India): 187 g (6.6 oz)
- Operating system: Android 11, with: T1 and T1x (China): OriginOS 1.0; T1 5G (India): FuntouchOS 12
- System-on-chip: T1 (China): Qualcomm Snapdragon 778G; T1x: MediaTek Dimensity 900; T1 (India): Qualcomm Snapdragon 695
- CPU: Octa-core: T1 (China): Octa-core (4x2.4 GHz Kryo 670 & 4x1.8 GHz Kryo 670); T1x: Octa-core (2x2.4 GHz Cortex-A78 & 6x2.0 GHz Cortex-A55); T1 (India): Octa-core (2x2.2 GHz Kryo 660 Gold & 6x1.7 GHz Kryo 660 Silver)
- GPU: T1 (China): Adreno 642L; T1x: Mali-G68 MC4; T1 (India): Adreno 619
- Memory: T1 (China): 8 or 12 GB LPDDR4X RAM; T1x: 6 or 8 GB LPDDR4X RAM; T1 (India): 4, 6 or 8 GB LPDDR4X RAM
- Storage: T1 and T1x (China): 128 or 256 GB UFS 3.1 ROM; T1 5G (India): 128GB UFS 3.0 ROM
- Battery: Li-Po 5000 mAh
- Rear camera: T1 (China): 64 MP, f/1.8, 26mm, 1/1.97" with PDAF (wide) + 8 MP, f/2.2, 120°, 16 mm, 1/4", 1.12 µm (ultrawide) + 2 MP, f/2.4 (macro); T1x: 64 MP, f/1.8, 26mm, 1/1.97" with PDAF (wide) + 2 MP, f/2.4 (macro); T1 (India): 50 MP, f/1.8, 26mm, 1/1.97" with PDAF (wide) + 2 MP, f/2.4 (macro) + 2 MP, f/2.4 (depth sensor); Both China T1 and T1x: Gyro-EIS, LED flash, HDR, 4K@30/60 fps, 1080p@30/60 fps; India T1 5G: dual-LED flash, HDR, 1080p@30 fps
- Front camera: T1 (China): 16 MP, f/2.5 1080p@30 fps, HDR; T1x: 8 MP, f/2.0 1080p@30 fps; T1 (India): 16 MP, f/2.0 1080p@30 fps
- Display: T1 (China) IPS LCD capacitive touchscreen with HDR10 support 6.67 in (169 mm) 2400 × 1080 1080p (2.59 MP), (395 ppi with 20:9 aspect ratio), 16.7 million colors, 120 Hz refresh rate with punch-hole camera on the center; T1x and T1 (India) IPS LCD capacitive touchscreen 6.58 in (167 mm) 2408 × 1080 1080p (2.6 MP), (401 ppi with 20.07:9 aspect ratio), 16.7 million colors, 120 Hz refresh rate with dew drop screen
- Connectivity: T1: Bluetooth 5.2, Wi-Fi a/b/g/n/ac, A2DP, LE, aptX HD, aptX Adaptive; T1x: Bluetooth 5.2, Wi-Fi a/b/g/n/ac, A2DP, LE, aptX HD; T1 5G: Bluetooth 5.1, Wi-Fi a/b/g/n/ac, A2DP, LE
- Data inputs: Fingerprint scanner (side-mounted); Accelerometer; gyroscope; proximity sensor; gyro (China T1 and T1x only)
- Website: T1: www.vivo.com.cn/vivo/t1; T1x: www.vivo.com.cn/vivo/t1x; T1 5G: www.vivo.com/in/products/t15g

vivo T1 (China, Malaysia, India 44W), vivo T1x (5G and 4G), vivo T1 5G (India) and vivo T1 Pro (India, rebranded Malaysian vivo T1) are the 5G Android-based smartphones manufactured by Vivo Communication Technology Co.

The duo of vivo T1 and vivo T1x released on November 1, 2021, in China, while the India version of vivo T1 5G, released on February 9, 2022, with the lower-end chipset. The duo of vivo T1 and T1x are very similar to the iQOO Z5 series. The vivo T1 has the 120 Hz HDR10 IPS LCD punch-hole center screen, 64MP + 8MP + 2MP triple camera setup, 16MP selfie camera, a 5000 mAh battery, 44W charging and runs with high-end Snapdragon 778G chipset. On the other hand, vivo T1x has the same display but with dew drop screen and no HDR10, 64MP + 2MP dual camera setup, 8MP selfie camera, with the same battery and 44W charging with the lower-end Dimensity 900 chipset just like as iQOO Z5x.

The India vivo T1 5G has the different design compared to those other two, with 50MP + 2MP + 2MP different triple camera setup, 16MP selfie camera, with the same battery but with lower fast 18W charger and runs with the lower-end Snapdragon 695 chipset. The vivo Y55 5G and vivo Y75 5G (not to be confused with vivo Y75 (2017), the China version of vivo V7.) released in January 2022, and re-released as vivo T1 in India. This phone was later rebranded as iQOO Z6 in March 2021.

The Malaysia versions of vivo T1 (66W) and vivo T1x 4G has launched on April 26, 2022. The Malaysian Vivo T1 has the same design as vivo S15e, but the main camera is 64-megapixels instead of 50-megapixels in vivo S15e. However, it uses the same chipset as vivo T1 launched in China, it doesn't have 256GB storage and 12GB memory options, and has the fingerprint sensor mounted on the side, but it keeps the 66W charging along with 4700 mAh battery and a 8GB memory option. On the other hand, the vivo T1x 4G is different from 5G version launched in China, it shares nearly all of the same specifications as the vivo Y33s/Y33t, but has the 8-megapixels selfie camera (down from 16MP in Y33s 4G). It also doesn't have NFC and the USB Type-C cable is downgraded to 1.0, also removed the gyro. But it has the HDR support and supports up to 90 Hz, and uses the Snapdragon 680 4G chipset just like in iQOO U5x launched in China. Later the vivo T1 (66W) was rebranded as Indian vivo T1 Pro on May 4, 2022.

The India 4G version of vivo T1 is announced on May 4, 2022 - with vivo T1 Pro 5G. It shares all same specifications with iQOO Z6 44W launched on May 2, 2022. It has 44W charging + 5000mAh lithium polymer battery, with 128 GB storage and 4, 6 or 8 GB memory options. It runs on lower end Snapdragon 680 (4G) compared to vivo T1 5G (Snapdragon 695 5G). It has an AMOLED screen, instead of an IPS LCD screen in Chinese and Indian vivo T1. However, it runs on lower 60 Hz refresh rate (down from 120 Hz in Chinese, Indian and Malaysian vivo T1). It has an under-display fingerprint sensor, gyro-EIS sensor, runs on Android 12 (powered by FuntouchOS 12) and has a 50-megapixels main camera, with two 2-megapixels secondary macro and depth sensors. It is available on Midnight Galaxy, Starry Sky and Ice Dawn.
