= Gina Yoginda =

Indonesian military officer (born 1963)

Ambassador of Indonesia to North Korea
- In office 19 December 2025
- President: Prabowo Subianto
- Preceded by: Berlian Napitupulu

Personal details
- Born: May 2, 1963 (age 63)
- Education: Indonesian Military Academy; Indonesian Open University; Indonesian Defence University

Military service
- Allegiance: Indonesia
- Branch/service: Army
- Years of service: 1986 – 2021
- Rank: Major general
- Unit: Cavalry
- Commands: Armed Forces Intelligence Agency; Semarang Military District; 2nd Cavalry Battalion

Gina Yoginda (born 2 May 1963) is an Indonesian military officer and diplomat who is currently serving as ambassador of Indonesia to North Korea since 2025. Prior to his ambassadorship, Gina served within intelligence units at the Indonesian armed forces, with his last position as deputy chief of the armed forces intelligence agency.

== Career ==
Born on 2 May 1963, Gina graduated from the Indonesian Military Academy in 1986, where he was commissioned as a second lieutenant in the cavalry corps. He holds a bachelor's degree in public administration from the Indonesian Open University and a master's degree in total war strategy from the Indonesian Defence University.

He served as the commander of the 2nd Cavalry Battalion in Semarang from 2002 to 2003 and as the commander of the Semarang military district on 6 November 2003, both with the rank of lieutenant colonel. In 2006, Gina, already a colonel, was appointed as defense attaché at the embassy in Beograd. By the 2010s, he was assigned to the Coordinating Ministry for Politics, Law, and Security as chief of ASEAN regional cooperation section and to the Bukit Barisan Regional Military Command as expert staff for national defence system.

On 2 July 2018, Gina, who was attached to the army cavalry center, was appointed as Director E of the Indonesian Strategic Intelligence Agency, responsible for countering radicalism and terrorism. In accordance with his new position, on 5 September Gina was promoted to the rank of brigadier general. He was appointed as the commander of the main unit of the agency in 2019 before promoted to the deputy chief of the armed forces intelligence agency on 27 July 2020. He received his second star on 2 September 2020.

Gina entered retirement with his assignment to the armed forces headquarters on 23 February 2021. Upon retirement, President Joko Widodo nominated him as the ambassador to Afghanistan in June 2021. Although he passed the assessment process held by the House of Representatives, by the time he was confirmed as ambassador Taliban had already take control of Afghanistan following the 2021 Taliban offensive, and the post remained empty as Indonesia did not recognize the new government. At the end of Joko Widodo's term, in August 2024 Gina was nominated for ambassador to Syria. However, he was never summoned for a fit and proper test by the House of Representatives for the office.

After Joko Widodo was replaced by Prabowo Subianto, Gina was nominated for ambassador to North Korea in July 2025. The post was vacant since 2021 due to the COVID-19 pandemic in the country. He was sworn in as ambassador on 19 December 2025 and arrived to take up his duties on 21 February 2026. His arrival marked the official re-opening of Indonesia's embassy in North Korea.
