= Xiqu Subdistrict, Zhongshan =

Xiqu 西区街道
- Subdistrict
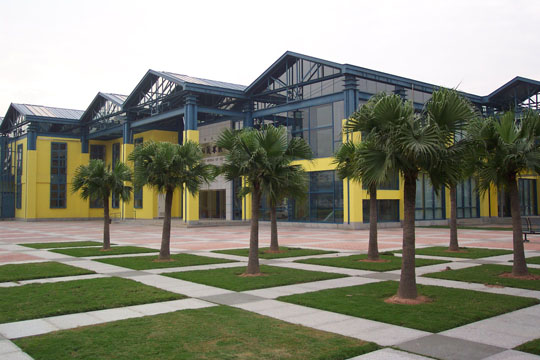
- Zhongshan Arts Museum in West District, Zhongshan

- Xiqu is labeled '3' on this map of Zhongshan

- Zhongshan in Guangdong
- Coordinates: 22°31′08″N 113°21′24″E
- Country: People's Republic of China
- Province: Guangdong
- Prefecture-level city: Zhongshan

Population (2020)
  - Total: 133,078
- Time zone: UTC+8 (China Standard)

Xiqu Subdistrict (Chinese: 西区; pinyin: Xī Qū; Jyutping: sai^{1} keoi^{1}), also known as West Subdistrict or Western Subdistrict, is a subdistrict directly administered by the city of Zhongshan, Guangdong province, China. It covers 26.7 square kilometres (10.3 sq mi) and had a population of 133,078 in 2020. It is a main industrial and commercial centre of the city. As of 2020, it has nine residential neighborhoods under its administration:

- Yanzhou Community (烟洲社区)
- Guangfeng Community (广丰社区)
- Xiyuan Community (西苑社区)
- Changzhou Community (长洲社区)
- Houshan Community (后山社区)
- Shalang Community (沙朗社区)
- Longchang Community (隆昌社区)
- Longping Community (隆平社区)
- Caihong Community (彩虹社区)

== Economy ==
The video game company Subor has its headquarters here.
