= Pyongyang Racer =

2012 video game

- Developer: Nosotek
- Publisher: Koryo Tours
- Engine: Adobe Flash
- Platform: Browser
- Release: 19 December 2012
- Genre: Racing
- Mode: Single-player

Pyongyang Racer is a 2012 racing video game developed by Nosotek and published by Koryo Tours. The player drives a Hwiparam II car around Pyongyang and visits several of its sights while collecting fuel and avoiding other vehicles. It was created as an advergame for Koryo Tours, a travel agency organising tours to North Korea, by the outsourcing company Nosotek in collaboration with students from the Kim Chaek University of Technology. As one of North Korea's few video games, Pyongyang Racer was released by Koryo Tours through its website in December 2012. Reviewers criticised the gameplay, graphics, controls, and music.

== Gameplay ==
A traffic policewoman reminds the player to follow the intended route.

Pyongyang Racer is set in Pyongyang, the capital of North Korea. The player controls a Hwiparam II car (from the North Korean manufacturer Pyeonghwa Motors), using the arrow keys to accelerate, reverse, and steer, as well as the space bar to sound the horn. They are tasked with driving along a predetermined route around the city, starting and ending at Kim Il-sung Square, and visiting several of its sights, including the Ryugyong Hotel, Arch of Triumph, Chollima Statue, and Potong Gate. Passing a sight grants the player a stamp of the location and displays information about the object.

During their drive, the player has to repeatedly collect fuel tanks to counter a steadily depleting gauge. Colliding with stationary vehicles three times causes a reset. There are no pedestrians. Steering onto the wrong side of the road results in the player being reprimanded by traffic police, while driving off the street places them back onto it. The time the player takes to complete the tour is recorded. Koryo Tours maintained a leaderboard of players' times and updated it when a player sent in a screenshot of their results via email.

== Development and release ==
Pyongyang Racer was developed in North Korea, which does not have a major video game industry and was previously only known to have brought forth the 1997 Go simulation Eunbyeol Baduk and a series of Adobe Flash games for the South Korean web portal flashgame.co.kr in 2006. It was reported as the first North Korean game aimed at an international audience. It was developed by Nosotek, a German–North Korean information technology company founded in 2007 and based in Pyongyang. One of the company's major operations was the development of mobile games and Flash games on an outsourcing basis, several of which had been released by the Berlin company Exozet in Germany. Games previously developed by Nosotek include The Big Lebowski Bowling, Men in Black: Alien Assault, and Bobby's Blocks.

Pyongyang Racer was commissioned as an advergame by and for Koryo Tours, a British-run, Beijing-based travel agency that primarily organises tours to North Korea. The idea emerged when Nick Bonner, the manager of Koryo Tours, asked Nosotek's Volker Eloesser for a "fun, nonviolent and nonpolitical" game designed alongside North Korean youths. With support from the government of North Korea, the developer worked with students from the Kim Chaek University of Technology to create Pyongyang Racer in Adobe Flash. According to its website, it was "not intended to be a high-end technological wonder hit game of the 21st century, but more a fun race game (arcade style)".

Koryo Tours released Pyongyang Racer via its website on 19 December 2012 at no cost. It became popular among people interested in North Korea for its oddities, and the website had several outages in the days following the release.

== Reception ==
Pyongyang Racer was met with negative reviews. Charlie Custer of Tech in Asia criticised the "pretty awful" graphics as being "full of glitches and artefacts", also noting repetitive scenery and a low frame rate. Vice's Nadja Sayej similarly lamented the sparsely populated landscape, which she said had "the visual dazzle of Saskatchewan or rural Ontario". Citing the simple gameplay, summarising it as driving "in a straight line for a long time", she called the game "profoundly uninteresting". Sayej concurred with Jason Torchinsky of Jalopnik, who described the game as "slow, wildly boring, empty, incredibly restricted, and at least a decade behind technologically". Custer described the gameplay as "terrible" for its lack of challenge, slow speed, and poor vehicle handling. He further regarded the music as "hard not to laugh at", while Torchinsky called it "stunningly annoying and constant". Both stated that the game unintentionally felt like a parody or sarcastic commentary on real-life Pyongyang.

== See also ==
- Video games in North Korea
