= Subor =

Chinese electronics company

Xiaobawang Company
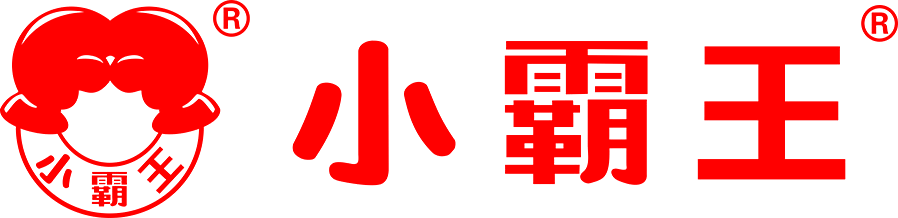

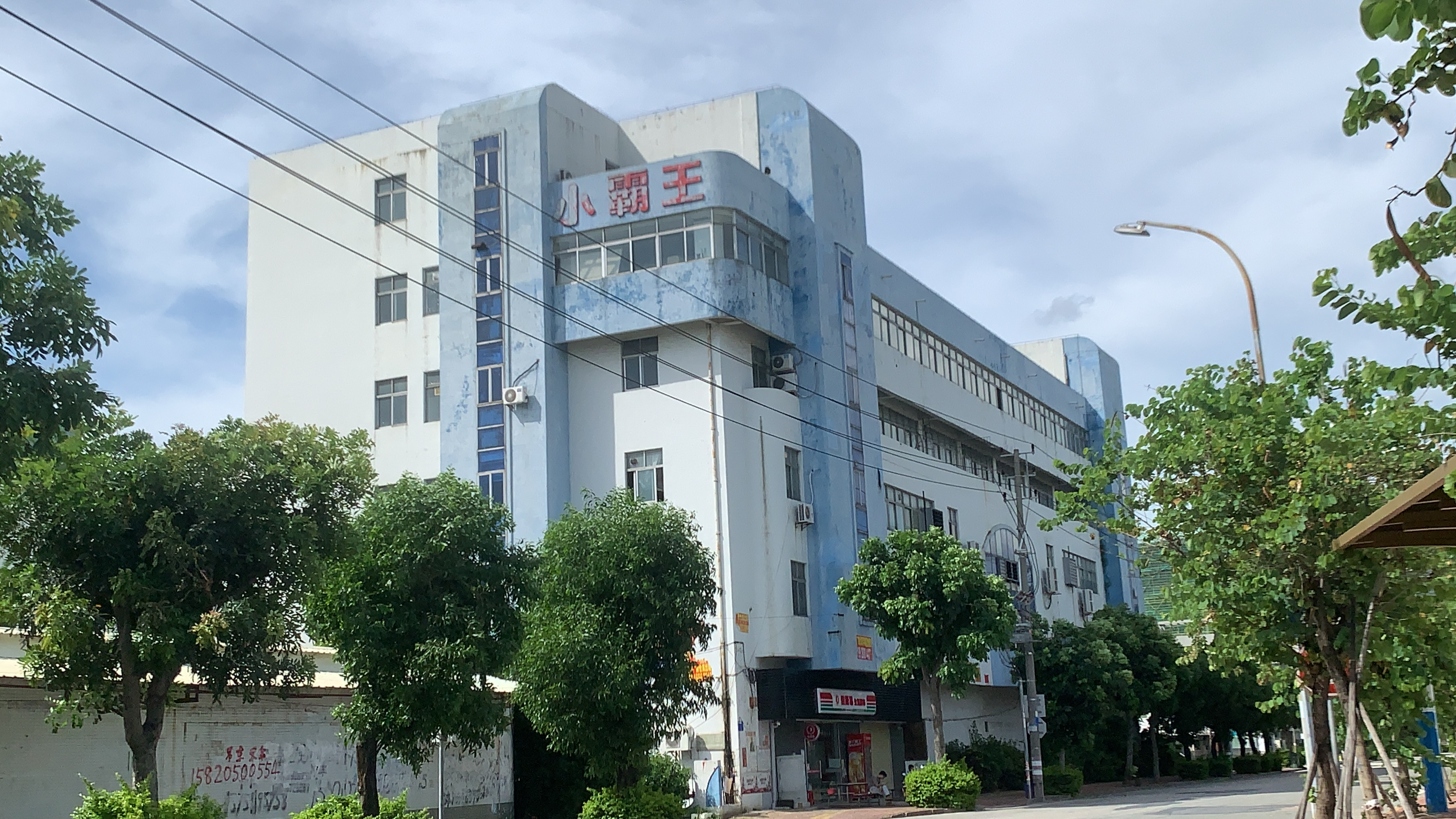
- Company headquarters
- Formerly: Nihwa Electronics Factory
- Type: Private
- Headquarters: Zhongshan, China
- Owner: Yihua Group

Subor Culture Development Co., Ltd.
- Simplified Chinese: 小霸王文化发展有限公司
- Traditional Chinese: 小霸王文化發展有限公司
- Literal meaning: Little Conqueror Culture Development Company, Limited
Transcriptions
Standard Mandarin
- Hanyu Pinyin: Xiǎo Bàwáng Wénhuà Fāzhǎn Yǒuxiàngōngsī

Subor is the Western brand name for a range of consoles and computer systems produced by Xiaobawang Company (Chinese: 小霸王, Xiǎo Bàwáng, lit. "Little Overlord/Conqueror/Tyrant"), based in Zhongshan, China. Xiaobawang Company is owned by Yihua Group. The consoles were very popular at the end of the 1980s and in the 90s. Later the company diversified to manufacturing other electronic devices.

== History ==
Circa 1987, Nihwa Electronics Factory was a struggling arcade game manufacturer owned by Yihua Group. It was headquartered in Xiqu Subdistrict, Zhongshan, Guangdong.

In 1989, Yihua Group appointed graduate Duan Yongping as director of the Nihwa Electronics Factory. Duan oversaw the development of the company's first console model in 1991, the D25, a famiclone that was given the name Xiǎo Bàwáng (Chinese: 小霸王; lit. 'Little Conqueror'). The console sold at a much lower price than importing the official Famicom, becoming very popular in the region.

That same year, Nihwa Electronics Factory was renamed to Xiaobawang Company, known as Subor in the west.

In 1993, the consoles started being marketed as educational personal computers in line with parents' stigma over video games, with versions with keyboard and educational software produced. These models were based on combining the Taiwanese Laser-310 with an NES/Famicom chip, and called Chinese English Learning Machine (Chinese: 中英文电脑学习机). The first model was the SB-218. In 1993–4, improved models SB-286 and SB-486 were released. Jackie Chan became a spokesperson for the company.

In 1995, the SB-926 was released. However, Duan left the company in August. He was not satisfied with the financial setup of the company and the fact that the Yihua Group would not give him or other staff shares. He went on to found BBK Electronics later in the same year.

In 1998, the company's last famiclone, the SB-2000, was released. Although, still using 8-bit 6502 based system (CPU UM6561), it was upgraded with 512KB of RAM, separate keyboard, mouse and disk drive. It had revised software and included a similar terminal prompt similar to MS-DOS, F-BASIC, Windows 98 and a mouse driven GUI.

The Xiaobawang Company was impacted by the ban on game consoles in China. The ban lasted from 2000 to 2015. Subor faced a bankruptcy petition in November 2020.

The company specialized in other electronic products such as dictionaries. In 2004, a number of subsidiaries were created: Xiaobawang Educational Electronics, Xiaobawang Digital Audio, Xiaobawang Electrical Appliances, and Xiaobawang Kitchen.

Since the lifting of the ban on game consoles, Xiaobawang produced new gaming computers and emulator-based consoles honoring its legacy of developing Famiclones. Xiaobawang Company also invested money into virtual reality devices. Many of the games and software for these consoles was developed by the Fuzhou-based company Waixing Science & Technology, with whom Xiaobawang had close ties.

== Subor Z+ ==
Subor Z+ (also called the Subor Z Plus) was a Windows-based home gaming console/PC hybrid announced by Subor in 2018. The system used a custom AMD Ryzen + Vega SoC and was marketed as a Chinese domestic alternative to mainstream consoles. Several titles were promoted for the platform, including Reincarnation Sutra, Wrathful Legion: Reloaded and Incredible Dream Butterfly, along with international games demonstrated on the hardware such as Onrush. However, the Z+ was never officially released, despite at least 3,000 units having been manufactured.

== Impact ==
Karen Chiu stated in 2019 that Chinese people who played video games as children had nostalgia for the Xiǎo Bàwáng Video Game System comparable to such in Western countries for non-Chinese consoles. In 2019, a localized version of the Subor G80 console (renamed to the Moranbong console) was released in North Korea.

== Subsidiaries ==
=== Subor Culture Development ===
According to Sixth Tone, Subor Culture Development was spun out of Yihua Group, in 2015, to develop virtual reality products.

Subor Culture Development went bankrupt in 2020 as per the Zhongshan Intermediate People's Court, and authorities barred Feng Baolun, the legal representative of the company, from commerce deemed "high consumption" including commercial air travel and staying in a hotel deemed to be upscale due to Feng being labeled a "discredited" person. Sixth Tone said this was the only part of the company that is defunct and the Subor brand is still active.
