= BBK Electronics =

Defunct Chinese electronics conglomerate

BBK Electronics Corporation
- Native name: 广东步步高电子工业有限公司
- Romanized name: Guangdong BBK Electronics Industry Co., Ltd.
- Type: Private
- Industry: Consumer electronics
- Founded: 18 September 1995; 31 years ago
- Founder: Duan Yongping
- Defunct: 7 April 2023; 3 years ago
- Fate: Split and deregistered
- Successors: Oppo; Vivo
- Headquarters: Futian District, Shenzhen, China
- Area served: Worldwide
- Products: Smartphones; Smart TVs; Hi-Fi; Home theatre Audiovisual
- Brands: BBK; Oppo (OnePlus and Realme); Vivo (iQOO)

BBK Electronics
- Simplified Chinese: 广东步步高电子工业有限公司
- Traditional Chinese: 廣東步步高電子工業有限公司
- Literal meaning: Guangdong Bu Bu Gao Electronics Industrial Corporation Ltd. (Note: Bu Bu Gao (步步高) is a Chinese phrase that means "rising step by step", or "reaching a higher level with each step".)
Transcriptions
Standard Mandarin
- Hanyu Pinyin: Guǎngdōng Bù Bù Gāo Diànzǐ Gōngyè Yǒuxiàn Gōngsī

BBK Electronics Corporation was a Chinese multinational electronics conglomerate, created by Duan Yongping. It was a leading consumer electronics brand specialising in audio and video equipment, home entertainment products and home appliances. It also acted as an investor in leading companies in various sectors of consumer electronics. The company specialized in developing consumer electronics products such as smartphones, tablet computers, smartwatches, smart TVs, Hi-Fi equipment, Blu-ray players, and digital cameras.

The company was deregistered on 7 April 2023 as it split its component brands off into separate companies or brands. The reported reasoning for this was to avoid regulatory scrutiny on Chinese companies.

As of 2026 the companies include Oppo, OnePlus (which operates as a subsidiary of Oppo), Realme (which operates as a subsidiary of Oppo), Vivo and IQOO (which operates as a subsidiary of Vivo).

== History ==
Guangdong BBK Electronics Corporation limited was established on 18 September 1995, in Dongguan, Guangdong, China, By Duan Yongping. Due to the conflict between Duan and the boss of Subor, Duan Yongping decided to leave Subor and create another company, making a commitment to not engage in student computer-related products within one year. In 1996, BBK released their first product line - the corded telephone. After the promised one year, BBK released their first student computer product "BBG Student Computer (Floppy No.1)"(BBG is the original English name of BBK). Once the product was release, it achieved great success, making BBK one of the three major student computer companies in China (the other two companies are Subor and Yuxing), and finally became the most popular student computer product in China according the investigation made by China National Radio in July 1997. Meanwhile, Duan divided BBK into three – the AV factory (the predecessor of Oppo), the telephone factory (the predecessor of Vivo), and the computer and video game factory (the predecessor of BBK Education Electronics/Little Genius Limited Technology), each operating independently. In order to increase the responsiveness of the three factories, the headquarters has decentralized some marketing and after-sales rights; the three factories regularly reconcile accounts with the headquarters and allocate a certain percentage of their annual profits to cover the operating costs of the headquarters' functional departments.

As the group's business continued to improve, Duan Yongping felt that the time was ripe to let go completely. Therefore, at the beginning of 1999, based on the previous situation of the three factories operating independently, the group was further split into three companies with independent equity and personnel. From then on, the computer and video game factory, telephone factory, and AV factory became completely independent companies with their own equity and personnel structures. However, at that time, the three companies could still share about 80% of the original BBK channels, and the brand operation of BBK was still managed by the headquarters.

Oppo's subsidiaries include OnePlus, and Realme is now a mostly independent operation. Vivo's subsidiaries include iQOO (a sub-brand of Vivo). It also marketed Blu-ray players, headphones, headphone amplifiers and smartwatches under Oppo Digital brand. In March 2019, BBK Electronics announced IQOO as its newest member and also a performance sub-brand.

BBK Electronics' headquarters and production base were located in Chang'an, Dongguan. It was the biggest taxpayer in Chang'an.

In Q1 2017, BBK Electronics shipped 56.7 million smartphones, surpassing Huawei and Apple to become the 2nd largest smartphone manufacturer in the world, behind Samsung.

In 2020, BBK Electronics represented by Oppo, announced its involvement in independent research and development of chips. Vivo also followed up to manufacture chips, mainly in cooperation with MediaTek.

As of October 2022, BBK Electronics's Chinese-market website redirects to its subsidiary, Guangdong Little Genius Limited Technology Corporation, a manufacturer of smartwatches marketed for children.
