= Koryo Tours =

Travel company specializing in North Korea

- Founded: 1993; 33 years ago
- Headquarters: Beijing, China
- Website: www.koryogroup.com

Koryo Tours is an independent British tour operator based in Beijing, specializing in group and private tourism to North Korea. Their tours run throughout the year covering budget to exclusive trips. There are packages for staying in the capital Pyongyang with visits to the DMZ at the border with the Republic of Korea. At different times of year there are other events such as the Mass Games and the Pyongyang International Film Festival which are available as special tours when they are running.

== History ==
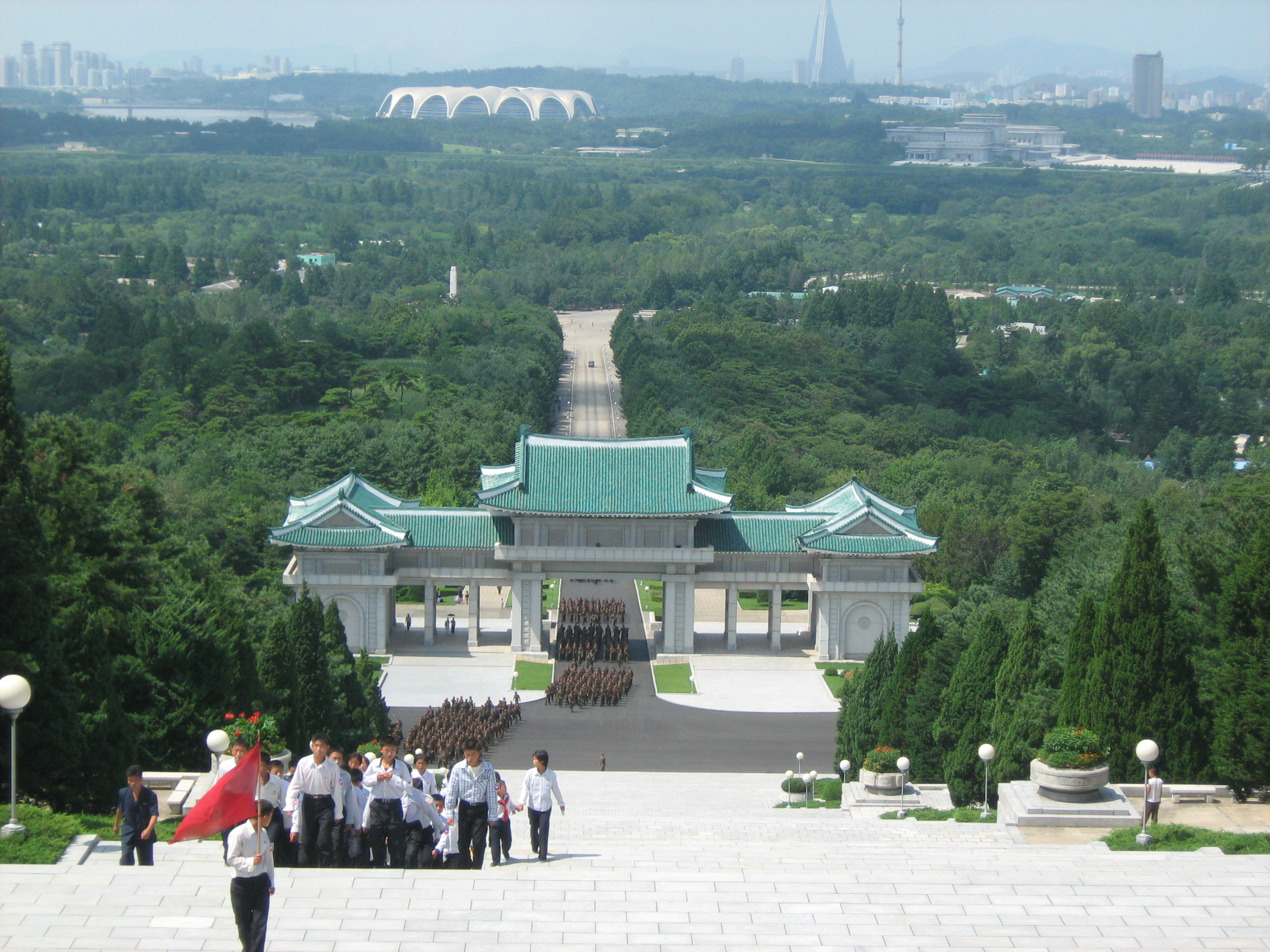
A photo taken during a tour organized by Koryo Tours

In 1993, Koryo Tours was set up by Nick Bonner and Joshua Green and they have been organizing trips into North Korea since 1993.

== Tourism ==
In 1993, Koryo Tours was appointed as a travel specialist by the Korea International Travel Company, part of the Government of North Korea. Koryo Tours takes in over 50% of westerners visiting North Korea. Koryo Tours is responsible for opening up of new destinations in North Korea as well as new activities, such as cycling, educational tours, and so on.

== Film production ==
Koryo Tours was involved in the production of a number of films. The Game of Their Lives (2002), A State of Mind (2004) and Crossing the Line (2006) were documentaries. Comrade Kim Goes Flying (2012) was a romantic comedy feature film, shot in Pyongyang, with a North Korean cast and crew.

Koryo Tours also assisted in the production of Aim High in Creation (2013) and Michael Palin in North Korea on ITV (2019).

As part of the making of The Game of Their Lives, Koryo Tours organised the return of the North Korean team of the 1966 FIFA World Cup to the United Kingdom in October 2002. Over 100,000 British football fans turned out to welcome the players at various football clubs.

== Cultural activities ==
They have organised various cultural exchanges, including music and sport.

Koryo Tours is the exclusive partner for the Pyongyang International Marathon held every April, an event that attracts between hundreds and over 1,000 amateur foreigners a year.

In 2014 Koryo Tours provided the North Korean input for the Korea Pavilion at the Venice Architectural Biennale, curator Minsuk Cho. The pavilion won the Golden Lion.

Koryo Tours is the international co-ordinator for the bi-annual Pyongyang International Film Festival which has a local audience total of 120,000. In 2004 and 2006 they screened Bend It Like Beckham, Bean: The Ultimate Disaster Movie and Bride and Prejudice, each film seen by over 12,000 locals. They assisted the British Embassy with the nationwide broadcast of Bend It Like Beckham on 26 December 2010 (the first western feature film to be broadcast in North Korea).

In conjunction with the North Korean Ministry of Sport, they arranged the first friendship football, ice hockey, cricket, volleyball and ultimate frisbee matches between locals and westerners. In September 2010 with the support of the British Embassy and CLSA to mark ten years of diplomatic relations they took Middlesbrough Women's FC to Pyongyang to play two North Korean teams, both matches watched by 6,000 Korean fans and broadcast nationwide.

=== Published work ===
Koryo Studio produced Printed in North Korea (2019), which contains a series of linocuts representing everyday life in North Korea. Koryo also produced Made in North Korea (2017), which focuses on the graphic design of products made in the country, and an accompanying London exhibition, Made in North Korea (2018).

2009 in-house publishing of 'The Art of DPRK – North Korean Film Posters'. 2007 produced 'Welcome to Pyongyang' a photographic study with Charlie Crane (winner of the British Journal of Photography International Prize). 2008 co-writer 'A Night in Pyongyang' (mass games photographic book) Werner Kranwetvogel. 2002 Wallpaper Magazine produced and wrote an architectural feature on Pyongyang in conjunction with a North Korean photographer.

In 2012, Koryo Tours released Pyongyang Racer, a racing video game developed by Nosotek with students from the Kim Chaek University of Technology, to promote tourism in North Korea.

== See also ==
- Tourism in North Korea
