= Nosotek =

North Korean software company

- Native name: 노소텍
- Type: Private
- Industry: Video game
- Founded: July 2007; 19 years ago in Pyongyang, North Korea
- Founder: Felix Abt, Volker Eloesser
- Headquarters: North Korea
- Area served: Worldwide
- Products: Pyongyang Racer
- Number of employees: 50 (2009)

Nosotek (Korean: 노소텍,제일정보기술합영회사) is the first Western-invested IT joint venture company in North Korea. Nosotek is known for developing computer games for various platforms, such as the iPhone, Java ME and the Wii. They claimed to have 50+ programmers on the team in 2009.

Nosotek's main target market is Europe and payments by customers are processed through companies in China or Hong Kong.

== History ==
Nosotek was founded in July 2007 by the North Korean General Federation of Science and Technology (GFST) and the foreign entrepreneurs Felix Abt and Volker Eloesser. Ju Jong Chol also played a major role in founding of the company. The company was joint venture between GFST and Felix Abt and Eastmars Ltd (Owned by Volker Eloesser).

Nosotek took industry by surprise with its popular western oriented games. This included a popular role-playing game for the Nintendo Wii and an app that reached Apple's Top 10 list in Germany for at least 1 week in 2008. They also developed award-winning medical software. Products' names are kept are confidential as clients don't want to be associated with North Korea.

Nosotek's co-founder Felix Abt claimed that company became profitable in less than a year. Several of Nosotek's games are distributed by German company Exozet Games, which includes a game called "Bobby's Blocks."

Between 2007 and 2010, Nosotek's North Korean programmers made mobile-phone games based on the Hollywood films The Big Lebowski and Men in Black which were then distributed in the western countries by Nosotek Joint Venture Company. They developed "Big Lebowski Bowling", a 2007 bowling game set in a bowling alley where much of the movie was set, and "Men in Black: Alien Assault" a game in which players battle invading aliens. Those games were published through Ojom GmbH, a subsidiary of Jamba, which was later wholly bought by News Corp. for $188 million in October 2008 and later renamed Fox Mobile. Elocom Mobile Entertainment GmbH was founded by Volker Eloesser in 2003, which was later brought by Ojom.

In 2012, Nosotek cooperated with students from the Kim Chaek University of Technology to develop Pyongyang Racer, a racing video game built for and released by the Koryo Tours travel agency to promote tourism in North Korea. This game represents the first North Korean game which was widely available online. As it turns out had Pyongyang Racer was based upon an earlier game developed by Nosotek which was published on Facebook by "one of the big players in the social media market." Nick Bonner conversed with Volker Eloesser, which led to the creation of the game. He liked the idea of working on a "fun, nonviolent and nonpolitical" project with North Korean youth.

The company's software development business, which it offered since its founding in 2007, appears to be shut down and, since 2013, the company's website has been inaccessible after being hacked. The site was hit in 2013 and its front page was replaced with a message in French, English and Korean attacking North Korea. A tag on the page claimed the hack was the work of "Syndicat de Boucher-Leblanc." A linked website entitled "Global Clandestine Operations Network" has information in English, French, Russian and Arabic, but offers little information about the group. The hacked content has gone and the main site is yet to return.
