= Cyber Cycles =

1995 video game

- Arcade flyer
- Developer: Namco
- Publisher: Namco
- Composers: Ayako Saso; Yuri Misumi
- Platform: Arcade
- Release: JP: 1995; US: 1995; EU: 1995
- Genre: Racing
- Modes: Single-player, multiplayer
- Arcade system: Namco System 22

Cyber Cycles (Note: Japanese: サイバーサイクルズ, Hepburn: Saibā Saikuruzu) is a 1995 racing video game developed and published by Namco for arcades. It was released in Japan and North America in May 1995. It runs on the Namco System 22.

Hamster Corporation released the game as part of their Arcade Archives series for the Nintendo Switch and PlayStation 4, as well as their Arcade Archives 2 series for the Nintendo Switch 2, PlayStation 5 and Xbox Series X/S in August 2026.

== Gameplay ==
Players must choose one of three different types of motorcycles, with two more available through cheat codes. The player races through courses under a strict time limit in a similar manner to Ridge Racer, which can be extended through checkpoints until the player reaches the finish line.

== Reception ==
In Japan, Game Machine listed Cyber Cycles on their August 1, 1995 issue as being the fourth most-successful dedicated arcade game of the month. Next Generation reviewed the arcade version of the game, rating it four stars out of five, and stated that "there's no mediocrity here. Namco's newest entry into the cycling arena [...] is an improvement through and through to the degree that it's really no longer in the same league."
