= Embassy of Indonesia, Pyongyang =

Embassy of the Republic of Indonesia in Pyongyang Kedutaan Besar Republik Indonesia di Pyongyang

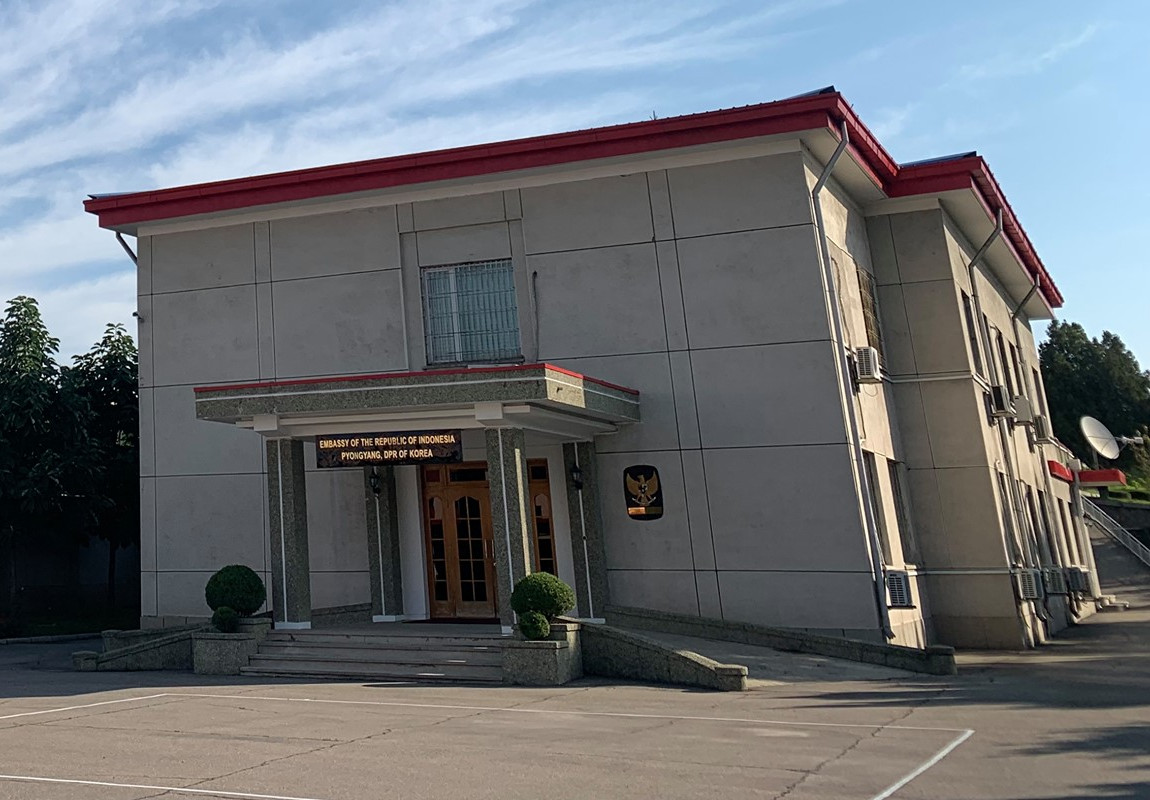
- Chancery of the Indonesian Embassy in Pyongyang
- Location: Pyongyang, North Korea
- Coordinates: 39.0225822°N 125.7889509°E
- Ambassador: Gina Yoginda
- Website: kemlu.go.id/pyongyang/en/

The Embassy of the Republic of Indonesia in Pyongyang (Indonesian: Kedutaan Besar Republik Indonesia di Pyongyang) is the diplomatic mission of the Republic of Indonesia to the Democratic People's Republic of Korea. The first Indonesian ambassador to North Korea was Ahem Erningpradja in 1965. Gina Yoginda was appointed by President Prabowo Subianto on 19 December 2025.

The embassy is located at Munsu-dong No.1 Diplomatic Compound Building No.17 Taedonggang District, Pyongyang, DPRK. It operates from Monday to Friday from 09:00 to 16:00 local time.

== History ==
The embassy reflects Indonesia’s long-standing and cordial relations with North Korea, which date back to the era of President Sukarno and Kim Il Sung in the 1960s. Both countries are members of the Non-Aligned Movement and share a common anti-imperialist stance. Indonesia is one of the few countries that still maintain diplomatic ties with North Korea despite international sanctions and isolation imposed on it due to its human rights abuses and nuclear missile program.

The embassy also serves as a channel for humanitarian assistance and cultural exchange between Indonesia and North Korea. In 2018, Indonesia donated 5,000 tons of rice to North Korea through the World Food Programme. In 2019, Indonesia hosted a cultural festival featuring North Korean artists and performers in Jakarta. The embassy also facilitates visits by Indonesian delegations and officials to North Korea, such as former president Megawati Sukarnoputri in 2002 and former speaker of parliament Setya Novanto in 2015.

== See also ==
- Indonesia–North Korea relations
- List of diplomatic missions of Indonesia
- List of diplomatic missions in North Korea
