= IQOO =

Chinese consumer electronics manufacturer, a subsidiary of Vivo

iQOO Communication Technology Co. Ltd.
- Type: Subsidiary
- Industry: Consumer electronics
- Founded: 30 January 2019 (7 years ago)
- Headquarters: Dongguan, Guangdong, China
- Area served: Worldwide
- Key people: Feng Yufei (CEO)
- Products: Smartphone; Charger; Earphone; Data cable
- Parent: Vivo
- Website: iqoo.com

iQOO Communication Technology Co. Ltd. (English: /aɪ̯ˈk(j)uː/) is a Chinese consumer electronics manufacturer headquartered in Dongguan, Guangdong. The company was founded on 30 January 2019 as a subsidiary of the consumer electronics manufacturer Vivo based in the same city. The brand name iQOO stands for I Quest On and On.

iQOO focuses on producing smartphones with high-performance specifications and a range of features at relatively low prices. Some models are released in limited editions with distinctive colors and back-panel designs.

== History ==
In March 2019, the world's second largest smartphone manufacturer, BBK Electronics, announced iQOO as a sub-brand of Vivo as its newest member to its smartphone brand lineup along with Oppo, Vivo, Realme and OnePlus. The brand was introduced in India in February 2020. iQOO is also a performance focused sub-brand giving more importance to build and market their phones specifically for gaming and other performance intense tasks, rather than their Vivo phones focusing mainly on camera and sound quality. The smartphone iQOO 3 introduced on 25 February 2020 is their first smartphone with Snapdragon 865. The smartphones are sold online initially.

During 2020–2021, the iQOO introduced six smartphones in the Chinese market and three smartphones in the Indian market, as of May 2021.

- iQOO U3 with MediaTek Dimensity 800U processor
- iQOO U1x with Snapdragon 662 processor and 5000 mAh battery
- iQOO Neo3 with Snapdragon 865 processor and 144 Hz refresh rate display
- iQOO 5 with Snapdragon 865 processor and 55 W fast charging
- iQOO 7 (International) with latest Snapdragon 888 processor and 66 W fast charging
- iQOO 9 Pro, launched in 2022 with the latest Snapdragon 8 Gen 1 (2022) processor, 1500 nits of brightness and 120w fast charging.
- iQOO 11 launched on 10 January 2023 with the latest Snapdragon 8 Gen 2 processor, and 120 W Fast Charging
- iQOO Z6 Lite 5G is equipped with World's First Snapdragon 4 Gen 1 with efficient 6nm process, 120Hz screen refresh rate, along with 5000mAh battery.
- iQOO Z7 5G launched on 21 March 2023 with the latest MediaTek Dimensity 920 processor, 1300 nits of brightness and 44 W fast charging.

== Products ==
=== Smartphones ===
==== iQOO 3 5G ====
iQOO 3 is a 5G smartphone launched in 2020 with Snapdragon 865 processor and iQOO UI 1.0 based on Android 10. The phone has a AMOLED display with support for HDR10+ and Corning Gorilla Glass 6, an aluminium frame with a glass back, and UFS 3.1 storage technology. It comes with a quad camera on the back with a 48MP primary sensor capable of recording at 4K@60fps. It also has an in-display fingerprint scanner, Wi-Fi 6 and a 55 W fast charging capable of charging the 4400 mAh battery to 50% in 15 minutes.

=== iQOO series ===
Model	SoC	CPU and specifications	GPU	RAM specifications	Storage specifications	Underlying operating system	UI	Size	Weight	Battery capacity	Charging power	Screen specifications	Rear camera	Front camera	Fingerprint recognition	Face recognition	Screen form
iQOO 11S	Qualcomm Snapdragon 8 Gen 2	Eight cores, Octa core (3.2 GHz, Single core, Cortex X3 + 2.8 GHz, Quad core, Cortex A715 + 2 GHz, Tri core, Cortex A510	Adreno 740	12/16 GB LPDDR5X	256/512 GB UFS 4.0	Android 13	OriginOS 3.0	164.9 × 77.1 × 8.7 mm	208g	4700mAh	USB-C 200W	6.78", 1440×3200, AMOLED, 144 Hz, E6 LTPO 4.0	Three lenses at the rear, 50 MP main camera (VCS IMX866) + 13 MP telephoto + 8 MP ultra wide angle	16MP	Under-screen optical fingerprint	Support	Hole punch screen in the center
iQOO 11	Qualcomm Snapdragon 8 Gen 2	Eight cores, Octa core (3.2 GHz, Single core, Cortex X3 + 2.8 GHz, Quad core, Cortex A715 + 2 GHz, Tri core, Cortex A510	Adreno 740	8/12/16 GB LPDDR5X	128/256/512 GB UFS 3.1 (128GB) UFS 4.0 (256GB/512GB)	Android 13	OriginOS 3.0	164.9 × 77.1 × 8.7 mm	208g	5000 mAh	USB-C 120W	6.78", 1440×3200, AMOLED, 144 Hz, E6 LTPO 4.0	Three lenses at the rear, 50 MP main camera (S5KGN5) + 13 MP telephoto + 8 MP ultra wide angle	16MP	Under-screen optical fingerprint	Support	Hole punch screen in the center
iQOO 10	Qualcomm Snapdragon 8+ Gen1 (SM8475)	Eight cores, Cortex-X2 (3.19 GHz) + 3x Cortex-A710 (2.75 GHz) + 4× Cortex-A510 (1.80 GHz)	Adreno 730	8/12 GB LPDDR5	128/256/512 GB UFS 3.1	Android 12	OriginOS 2.0 (Ocean)	164.5 × 77.1 × 8.4 mm	206 g (7.27 oz)	4700 mAh	USB-C 2.0, 120W	6.78", 2400×1080, Super AMOLED, HDR, 120 Hz, 1500 nits of peak brightness	Three lenses at the rear, 50 MP main camera with OIS + 12 MP 2× telephoto with PDAF + 13 MP ultra wide angle (all support gyro-EIS camera support	16MP	Under-display ultrasonic fingerprint support	Support	Hole punch screen in the center
iQOO 9T	Qualcomm Snapdragon 8+ Gen1 (SM8475)	Eight cores, Cortex-X2 (3.19 GHz) + 3x Cortex-A710 (2.75 GHz) + 4× Cortex-A510 (1.80 GHz)	Adreno 730	8/12 GB LPDDR5	128/256 GB UFS 3.1	Android 12	Funtouch 12	165 × 77 × 8 mm	206 g (7.27 oz)	4700 mAh	USB-C 2.0, 120W	6.78", 2400×1080, AMOLED, HDR10+, 120 Hz, 1500 nits of peak brightness	Three lenses at the rear, 50 MP main camera with OIS + 12 MP 2× telephoto with PDAF + 13 MP ultra wide angle (all support gyro-EIS camera support	16MP	Under-display ultrasonic fingerprint support	Support	Hole punch screen in the center
iQOO 9 SE (Note: SE is an initialism for Soft Edition (also known as Lite Edition).) (known as iQOO Neo5S in China)	Qualcomm Snapdragon 888	Eight cores, Kryo 680, 1 + 3 + 4 cores (2.84 GHz + 2.42 GHz + 1.80 GHz)	Adreno 660	8/12 GB LPDDR5	128/256 GB UFS 3.1	Android 12	FuntouchOS 12	163.2 × 76.4 × 8.4 mm	196g	4500 mAh	USB-C 66W	6.62", 2400×1080, Super AMOLED, 120 Hz, 1200 nits of peak brightness	Three lenses at the rear, 48 MP main camera with OIS + 13 MP ultra wide angle + 2 MP depth sensor	16MP	Under-display optical fingerprint support	Support	Hole punch screen in the center
iQOO 9 (Global)	Qualcomm Snapdragon 888+	Eight cores, Kryo 680, 1 + 3 + 4 cores (2.99 GHz + 2.42 GHz + 1.80 GHz)	Adreno 660	8/12 GB LPDDR5	128/256 GB UFS 3.1	Android 12	FuntouchOS 12	159.1 × 75.1 × 8.6 (or 8.7) mm	200g or 202g (depending on the height)	4350 mAh	USB-C 120W	6.56", 2400×1080, AMOLED, 120 Hz, 1200 nits (Note: The nit (known as Candela per square metre, cd/m^{2}) is the SI measurement unit of luminance, used to describe the various sources of light, like the brightness of the television, smartphones and computer monitor. The higher rating, the brighter the display is.) of peak brightness	Three lenses at the rear, 48 MP main camera with OIS + 13 MP 2× telephoto + 13 MP ultra wide angle	16MP	Under-display optical fingerprint support	Support	Hole punch screen in the center
iQOO 9 (China)	Qualcomm Snapdragon 8 Gen1 (SM8450)	Eight cores, Cortex-X2 (3.00 GHz) + 3× Cortex-A710 (2.50 GHz) + 4× Cortex-A510 (1.80 GHz)	Adreno 730	8/12 GB LPDDR5	128/256/512 GB UFS 3.1	Android 12	OriginOS 2.0 (Ocean)	164.5 × 76.7 × 8.4 mm	206g	4700 mAh	USB-C 120W + 10W reverse wireless charging	6.78", 2400×1080, AMOLED, 120 Hz, 1500 nits of peak brightness	Three lenses at the rear, 50 MP main camera with OIS + 12 MP 2× telephoto + 13 MP ultra wide angle (all support gyro-EIS camera support	16MP	Under-display optical fingerprint support	Support	Hole punch screen in the center
iQOO 8	Qualcomm Snapdragon 888	Eight cores, Kryo 680, 1 + 3 + 4 cores (2.84 GHz + 2.42 GHz + 1.80 GHz)	Adreno 660	8/12 GB LPDDR5	128/256 GB UFS 3.1	Android 11	OriginOS 1.0	159 × 75.1 × 8.6 mm	200g	4350 mAh	USB-C 120W	6.56", 2400×1080, AMOLED, 120 Hz	Three lenses at the rear, 48 MP main camera with OIS + 13 MP telephoto + 13 MP ultra wide angle	16MP	Under-screen optical fingerprint	Support	Hole punch screen in the center
iQOO 7 (India) (known as iQOO Neo5 in China)	Qualcomm Snapdragon 870	Eight cores, Kryo 585, 1 + 3 + 4 cores (3.20 GHz + 2.42 GHz + 1.80 GHz)	Adreno 650	8/12 GB LPDDR4	128/256 GB UFS 3.1	Android 11	FuntouchOS 11.1	162.2 × 75.8 × 8.7 mm	209.5g	4000 mAh	USB-C 66W	6.62", 2400×1080, AMOLED, 120 Hz	Three lenses at the rear, 48 MP main camera + 13 MP ultra wide angle + 2 MP depth sensor	16MP	Under-screen optical fingerprint	Support	Hole punch screen in the center
iQOO 7 (International)	Qualcomm Snapdragon 888	Eight cores, Kryo 680, 1 + 3 + 4 cores (2.84 GHz + 2.42 GHz + 1.80 GHz)	Adreno 660	8/12 GB LPDDR4	128/256 GB UFS 3.1	Android 11	FuntouchOS 11.1 (Global) OriginOS 1.0 (China)	162.2 × 75.8 × 8.7 mm	209.5g	4000 mAh	USB-C 66W (Global) 120W (China)	6.62", 2400×1080, AMOLED, 120 Hz	Three lenses at the rear, 48 MP main camera + 13 MP telephoto + 13 MP ultra wide angle	16MP	Under-screen optical fingerprint	Support	Hole punch screen in the center
iQOO 5	Qualcomm Snapdragon 865	Eight cores, Kryo 585, 1 + 3 + 4 cores (2.84 GHz + 2.42 GHz + 1.80 GHz)	Adreno 650	8/12 GB LPDDR5	128/256 GB UFS 3.1	Android 10	IQOO UI	160 × 75.6 × 8.3 mm	197g	4500 mAh	USB-C, 55W	6.56", 2400×1080, AMOLED, 120 Hz	Three lenses at the rear, 50 MP main camera + 13 MP telephoto + 13 MP ultra wide angle	16MP	Under-screen optical fingerprint	Support	Hole punch screen in the upper left corner
iQOO 3 5G	Qualcomm Snapdragon 865	Eight cores, Kryo 585, 1 + 3 + 4 cores (2.84 GHz + 2.42 GHz + 1.80 GHz)	Adreno 650	6/8/12 GB LPDDR5	128/256 GB UFS 3.1	Android 10	IQOO UI	158.5 × 74.8 × 9.1 mm	214g	4440 mAh	USB-C, 55W	6.44", 2400×1080, AMOLED	Four lenses at the rear, 48 MP main camera + 13 MP ultra wide angle + 13 MP portrait + 2 MP depth of field	16MP	Under-screen optical fingerprint	Support	Hole punch screen in the upper right corner
iQOO	Qualcomm Snapdragon 855	Eight cores, Kryo 485, 1 + 3 + 4 cores (2.84 GHz + 2.42 GHz + 1.80 GHz)	Adreno 640	6/8/12 GB	128/256 GB	Android 9.0 "Pie"	FuntouchOS 9	157.7 × 75.2 × 8.5 mm	196g	4000 mAh	USB-C, 22.5W(6+128) /44W	6.4", 2340×1080, AMOLED	Three lenses at the rear, 12 MP main camera + 13 MP wide angle + 2 MP secondary camera	12MP	Under-screen optical fingerprint	Support	Dew drop screen

=== iQOO Z series ===
Model	SoC	CPU and specifications	GPU	RAM specifications	Storage specifications	Underlying operating system	UI	Size	Weight	Battery capacity	Charging power	Screen specifications	Rear camera	Front camera	Fingerprint recognition	Face recognition	Screen form
iQOO Z7 5G	MediaTek Dimensity 920	Eight cores, 2× Cortex A78 + 6× Cortex A55 cores (2.5 GHz + 2.0 GHz)	Mali-G68 MC4	6/8 GB LPDDR4X	128 GB UFS 2.2	Android 13	Funtouch OS 13	158.9 × 75.5 × 7.8 mm	173g	4500 mAh	USB-C, 44 W	6.38", 2400×1080, 90 Hz AMOLED	64 MP primary camera + 2 MP depth camera	16 MP	Under display fingerprint	Support	Waterdrop notch display
iQOO Z6 Pro (also known as vivo T1 Pro and Malaysian vivo T1)	Qualcomm Snapdragon 778G	Eight cores, 2 + 6 Kryo 670 cores (2.4 GHz + 2.0 GHz)	Adreno 642L	6/8/12 GB	128/256 GB UFS 2.2	Android 12	FuntouchOS 12	159.7 × 73.6 × 8.5 mm	180g	4700 mAh	USB-C, 66 W	6.44", 2404×1080, 90 Hz AMOLED, HDR10+	Three lenses at the rear, 50 MP main camera + 8 MP ultrawide + 2 MP macro	16MP	Under display fingerprint	Support	Infinity-U display
iQOO Z6 44W (4G) (also known as vivo T1 44W)	Qualcomm Snapdragon 680	Eight cores, 4× Kryo 265G + 4× Kryo 265S cores (2.4 GHz + 1.9 GHz)	Adreno 620	4/6/8 GB	128 GB UFS 2.2	Android 12	FuntouchOS 12	160.8 × 73.8 × 8.4 mm	182g	5000 mAh	USB-C, 44 W	6.44", 2400×1080, AMOLED	Three lenses at the rear, 50 MP main camera + 2 MP macro + 2 MP depth sensor	16MP	Under display fingerprint	Support	Infinity-U display
iQOO Z6 (rebranded vivo T1 in India)	Qualcomm Snapdragon 695	Eight cores, 2× Kryo 660G + 6× Kryo 660S cores (2.2 GHz + 1.7 GHz)	Adreno 620	4/6/8 GB	128 GB UFS 2.1	Android 12	FuntouchOS 12	164 × 75.8 × 8.3 mm	185g	5000 mAh	USB-C, 18 W	6.58", 2408×1080, 120 Hz IPS LCD	Three lenses at the rear, 50 MP main camera + 2 MP macro + 2 MP depth sensor	16MP	Side mounted fingerprint	Support	Dew drop screen
iQOO Z5x (Note: x is an initialism for Lite Edition.) (also known as vivo T1x with 64MP camera)	MediaTek Dimensity 900	Eight cores, 2 + 6 cores (2.4 GHz + 2.0 GHz)	Mali-G68 MC4	6/8 GB	128/256 GB UFS 2.2	Android 11	OriginOS 1.0 (China)	164 × 75.3 × 8.5 mm	189g	5000 mAh	USB-C, 44 W	6.58", 2408×1080, 120 Hz IPS LCD	Three lenses at the rear, 50 MP main camera + 2 MP macro	8MP	Side mounted fingerprint	Support	Dew drop screen
iQOO Z5 (also known as vivo T1)	Qualcomm Snapdragon 778G	Eight cores, Kryo 670, 4 + 4 cores (2.4 GHz + 1.8 GHz)	Adreno 642L	8/12 GB	128/256 GB UFS 3.1	Android 11	FuntouchOS 12 (Global) OriginOS 1.0 (China)	164.7 × 76.7 × 8.5 mm	193g	5000 mAh	USB-C, 44 W	6.67", 2400×1080, 120 Hz IPS LCD	Three lenses at the rear, 64 MP main camera + 8 MP ultra wide angle + 2 MP macro	16MP	Side mounted fingerprint	Support	Hole-punch screen at the center
iQOO Z3	Qualcomm Snapdragon 768G	Eight cores, Kryo 475, 1 + 1 + 6 cores (2.8 GHz + 2.2 GHz + 1.80 GHz)	Adreno 620	6/8/12 GB	128/256 GB UFS 2.2	Android 11	FuntouchOS 11.1 (Global) OriginOS 1.0 (China)	164 × 75.3 × 8.5 mm	185.5g	4400 mAh	USB-C, 55 W	6.58", 2408×1080, 120 Hz IPS LCD	Three lenses at the rear, 64 MP main camera + 8 MP ultra wide angle + 2 MP macro	16MP	Side mounted fingerprint	Support	Dew drop screen
iQOO Z1x	Qualcomm Snapdragon 765G	Eight cores, Kryo 475, 1 + 1 + 6 cores (2.4 GHz + 2.2 GHz + 1.80 GHz)	Adreno 620	6/8 GB	128/256 GB UFS 2.1	Android 10	IQOO UI	164.2 × 76.5 × 9.1 mm	199.5g	5000 mAh	USB-C, 33 W	6.57", 2408×1080, IPS LCD	Three lenses at the rear, 48 MP main camera + 2 MP macro + 2 MP depth of field	16MP	Side mounted fingerprint	Support	Punch hole screen in the upper right corner
iQOO Z1	MediaTek Dimensity 1000+	Eight core, 4× Cortex-A77 + 4× Cortex-A55 cores (2.6 GHz + 2.0 GHz)	Mali-G77 MC9	6/8 GB	128/256 GB UFS 2.2 Write Booster	Android 10	IQOO UI	163.9 × 75.5 × 8.9 mm	194g	4500 mAh	USB-C, 44 W	6.57", 2408×1080, 144 Hz IPS LCD	Three lenses at the rear, 48 MP main camera + 8 MP ultra wide angle + 2 MP macro	16MP	Side mounted fingerprint	Support	Punch hole screen in the upper right corner

=== iQOO U series ===
Model	SoC	CPU and specifications	GPU	RAM specifications	Storage specifications	Underlying operating system	UI	Size	Weight	Battery capacity	Charging power	Screen specifications	Rear camera	Front camera	Fingerprint recognition	Face recognition	Screen form
iQOO U5e (known as vivo Y33e)	MediaTek Dimensity 700	Eight cores, 2× Cortex-A76 + 6× Cortex-A55 cores (2.2 GHz + 2.0 GHz)	Mali-G57 MC2	4/6 GB LPDDR5	128 GB UFS 2.1	Android 12	OriginOS 2.0 (Ocean)	164 × 75.8 × 8.3 mm	193g	5000 mAh	USB-C 2.0, 18W	6.51", 1600×720, IPS LCD	Two lenses at the rear, 13 MP main camera + 2 MP depth	8 MP	Side mounted fingerprint	Support	Dew drop screen
iQOO U5x Standard Edition (also known as iQOO U5x 4G)	Qualcomm Snapdragon 680	Eight cores, 4 × 2.4 GHz Kryo 265 Gold & 4 × 1.9 GHz Kryo 265 Silver	Adreno 610	4/8 GB LPDDR5	128 GB UFS 2.2	Android 12	OriginOS 2.0 (Ocean)	164 × 75.8 × 8.3 mm	179g	5000 mAh	microUSB 2.0, 18W	6.51", 1600×720, IPS LCD	Two lenses at the rear, 13 MP main camera + 2 MP macro	8 MP	Side mounted fingerprint	Support	Dew drop screen
iQOO U5	Qualcomm Snapdragon 695	Eight cores, 2× Kryo 660G + 6× Kryo 660S cores (2.2 GHz + 1.7 GHz)	Adreno 619	4/6/8 GB LPDDR5	64/128 GB UFS 2.2	Android 12	OriginOS 2.0 (Ocean)	164 × 75.8 × 8.3 mm	185g	5000 mAh	USB-C 18W	6.58", 2408×1080, 120 Hz IPS LCD	Two lenses at the rear, 50 MP main camera + 2 MP depth	8 MP	Side mounted fingerprint	Support	Dew drop screen
iQOO U3x Standard Edition (also known as iQOO U3x 4G)	MediaTek Helio G80	Eight cores, 2× Cortex-A75 + 6× Cortex-A55 cores (2.0 GHz + 1.8 GHz)	Mali-G52 MC2	4/6 GB LPDDR5	128 GB eMMC 5.1	Android 11	OriginOS 1.0 for iQOO	164.4 × 76.3 × 8.4 mm	191.4g	5000 mAh	microUSB 2.0, 18W	6.51", 1600×720, IPS LCD	Two lenses at the rear, 13 MP main camera + 2 MP depth	8 MP	Side mounted fingerprint	Support	Dew drop screen
iQOO U3x 5G	Qualcomm Snapdragon 480	Eight cores, Kryo 460, 2 + 6 cores (2.0 GHz + 1.80 GHz)	Adreno 618	4/6/8 GB LPDDR5	64/128 GB UFS 2.2	Android 11	OriginOS 1.0 for iQOO	164.2 × 75.4 × 8.4 mm	185.5g	5000 mAh	USB-C 18W	6.58", 2408×1080, 90 Hz IPS LCD	Two lenses at the rear, 13 MP main camera + 2 MP depth	8 MP	Side mounted fingerprint	Support	Dew drop screen
iQOO U3 5G	MediaTek Dimensity 800U	Eight cores, 2× Cortex-A76 + 6× Cortex-A55 cores (2.4 GHz + 2.0 GHz)	Mali-G57 MC3	6/8 GB LPDDR5	64/128 GB UFS 2.2	Android 10	IQOO UI 1.5	164.2 × 75.4 × 8.4 mm	185.5g	5000 mAh	USB-C 18W	6.58", 2408×1080, 90 Hz IPS LCD	Two lenses at the rear, 48 MP main camera + 2 MP depth	8 MP	Side mounted fingerprint	Support	Dew drop screen
iQOO U1x	Qualcomm Snapdragon 662	Eight cores, 4× Kryo 260G + 4× Kryo 260S cores (2.0 GHz + 1.80 GHz)	Adreno 610	4/6 GB LPDDR5	64/128 GB UFS 2.1	Android 10	IQOO UI	164.4 × 76.3 × 8.4 mm	190g	4500 mAh	microUSB 2.0, 18W	6.51", 1600×720, IPS LCD	Three lenses at the rear, 13 MP main camera + 2 MP macro + 2 MP depth sensor	8 MP	Side mounted fingerprint	Support	Dew drop screen
iQOO U1	Qualcomm Snapdragon 720G	Eight cores, 2× Kryo 465G + 6× Kryo 465S cores (2.30 GHz + 1.80 GHz)	Adreno 618	6/8 GB LPDDR5	64/128 GB UFS 2.1	Android 10	IQOO UI	162.1 × 76.6 × 8.5 mm	190g	4500 mAh	microUSB 2.0, 18W	6.53", 2340×1080, IPS LCD	Three lenses at the rear, 48 MP main camera + 2 MP macro + 2 MP depth sensor	8 MP	Side mounted fingerprint	Support	Hole punch screen in the upper left corner

=== iQOO Pro series ===
Model	SoC	CPU and specifications	GPU	RAM specifications	Storage specifications	Underlying operating system	UI	Size	Weight	Battery capacity	Charging power	Screen specifications	Rear camera	Front camera	Fingerprint recognition	Screen form
iQOO 11 Pro	Qualcomm Snapdragon 8 Gen 2	Eight cores, Octa core (3.2 GHz, Single core, Cortex X3 + 2.8 GHz, Quad core, Cortex A715 + 2 GHz, Tri core, Cortex A510	Adreno 740	8/12/16 GB LPDDR5X	256/512 GB UFS 4.0	Android 13	OriginOS 3.0	164.76 × 75.3 × 8.89 mm	213g	4700 mAh	USB-C 200W	6.78", 3200×1440, E6 LTPO 4.0 AMOLED, HDR10+, 120 Hz, 1800 nits of peak brightness	Three lenses at the rear, 50 MP main camera with OIS + 13 MP 2× telephoto with PDAF + 50 MP ultra wide angle with autofocus (all support gyro-EIS camera support	16MP	3D Sonic Max Under-display Ultrasonic fingerprint support	Hole punch screen in the center
iQOO 10 Pro	Qualcomm Snapdragon 8+ Gen1 (SM8475)	Eight cores, Cortex-X2 (3.19 GHz) + 3× Cortex-A710 (2.75 GHz) + 4× Cortex-A510 (1.80 GHz)	Adreno 730	8/12 GB LPDDR5	256/512 GB UFS 3.1 v6	Android 12	Funtouch 12 (International) OriginOS 2.0 (Ocean) (China)	164.9 × 75.5 × 9.5 mm	215.4g or 216.2g (depending on the back)	4700 mAh	USB-C 2.0, 200W with vivo FlashCharge or ~14W with USB PD + 10W reverse wireless charging + 50W fast wireless charging	6.78", 3200×1440, E5 LTPO 3.0 AMOLED, HDR10+, 120 Hz, 1500 nits of peak brightness	Three lenses at the rear, 50 MP main camera with OIS + 14.6 MP 2.5× telephoto with PDAF and OIS + 50 MP ultra wide angle with autofocus (all support gyro-EIS camera support	16MP	3D Sonic Max Under-display Ultrasonic fingerprint support	Hole punch screen in the center
iQOO 9 Pro	Qualcomm Snapdragon 8 Gen1 (SM8450)	Eight cores, Cortex-X2 (3.00 GHz) + 3× Cortex-A710 (2.50 GHz) + 4× Cortex-A510 (1.80 GHz)	Adreno 730	8/12 GB LPDDR5	128/256/512 GB UFS 3.1	Android 12	Funtouch 12 (International) OriginOS 2.0 (Ocean) (China)	164.8 × 75.2 × 8.8 mm	204g or 210g (depending on the back)	4700 mAh	USB-C 2.0, 120W + 10W reverse wireless charging + 50W fast wireless charging	6.78", 2400×1080, LTPO2 AMOLED, 120 Hz, 1500 nits of peak brightness	Three lenses at the rear, 50 MP main camera with OIS + 16 MP 2.5× telephoto + 50 MP ultra wide angle with autofocus (all support gyro-EIS camera support	16MP	3D Sonic Max Under-display Ultrasonic fingerprint support	Hole punch screen in the center
iQOO 8 Pro	Qualcomm Snapdragon 888+	Eight cores, Kryo 680, 1 + 3 + 4 cores (2.99 GHz + 2.42 GHz + 1.80 GHz)	Adreno 660	8/12 GB LPDDR5	128/256/512 GB UFS 3.1	Android 11	OriginOS 1.0	165 × 75.2 × 9.2 mm	205g	4500 mAh	7	6.78", 3200×1440, LTPO AMOLED, 120 Hz	Three lenses at the rear, 50 MP main camera + 13 MP telephoto + 48 MP ultra wide angle	16MP	3D Sonic Max Under-display Ultrasonic fingerprint support	Hole punch screen in the center
iQOO 5 Pro 5G	Qualcomm Snapdragon 865	Eight cores, Kryo 585, 1 + 3 + 4 cores (2.84 GHz + 2.42 GHz + 1.80 GHz)	Adreno 650	8/12 GB LPDDR5	256 GB UFS 3.1	Android 10	IQOO UI 1.5	159.6 × 73.3 × 8.9 mm	198g	4000 mAh	USB-C, 120W	6.56", 2376×1080, AMOLED, 120 Hz	Three lenses at the rear, 50 MP main camera + 8 MP periscope telephoto + 13 MP ultra wide angle	16MP	Under-screen optical fingerprint	Hole punch screen in the upper left corner
iQOO Pro	Qualcomm Snapdragon 855+	Eight cores, Kryo 485, 1 + 3 + 4 cores (2.96 GHz + 2.42 GHz + 1.80 GHz)	Adreno 640	8/12 GB	128 GB	Android 9.0 "Pie"	iQOO Monster UI based on Funtouch OS 9.1	158.8 × 75.7 × 9.3 mm	215g	4500 mAh	USB-C, 44W	6.4", 2340×1080, AMOLED	Three lenses at the rear, 48 MP main camera + 13 MP wide angle + 2 MP depth of field	12MP	Under-screen optical fingerprint	Dew drop screen
iQOO Pro 5G	Qualcomm Snapdragon 855+	Eight cores, Kryo 485, 1 + 3 + 4 cores (2.96 GHz + 2.42 GHz + 1.80 GHz)	Adreno 640	8/12 GB	128/256 GB	Android 9.0 "Pie"	iQOO Monster UI based on Funtouch OS 9.1	158.8 × 75.7 × 9.3 mm	217g	4500 mAh	USB-C, 44W	6.4", 2340×1080, AMOLED	Three lenses at the rear, 48 MP main camera + 13 MP wide angle + 2 MP depth of field	12MP	Under-screen optical fingerprint	Dew drop screen

=== iQOO Neo series ===
Model	SoC	CPU and specifications	GPU	RAM specifications	Storage specifications	Underlying operating system	UI	Size	Weight	Battery capacity	Charging power	Screen specifications	Rear camera	Front camera	Fingerprint recognition	Screen form
iQOO Neo8 Pro	Mediatek Dimensity 9200+					Android 13	OriginOS 3.0			5000 mAh	USB-C 120W				Under-display optical fingerprint support	
iQOO Neo8	Qualcomm Snapdragon 8+ Gen 1	Eight cores, 1× Cortex-X2 ( 3.0 GHz ) + 3× Cortex-A710 (2.5 GHz) + 4× Cortex-A510 ( 1.8 GHz )	Adreno 730			Android 13	OriginOS 3.0			5000 mAh	USB-C 120W				Under-display optical fingerprint support	
iQOO Neo7 Pro	Qualcomm Snapdragon 8+ Gen 1	Eight cores, 1× Cortex-X2 ( 3.19 GHz ) + 3× Cortex-A710 (2.75 GHz) + 4× Cortex-A510 ( 2.0 GHz )	Adreno 730	8/12 GB LPDDR5	128/256 GB UFS 3.1	Android 13	Funtouch 13	164.8 × 76.9 × 8.5 mm or 8.9 mm	197 g or 202 g	5000 mAh	USB-C 120W	6.78″ inches AMOLED, HDR 10+ 120 Hz with 1200 Hz touch sampling rate, 1300 Nits Brightness Display	Three lenses at the rear, 50 MP main camera with OIS, PDAF + 8 MP Ultrawide + 2 MP macro	16 MP	Under-display optical fingerprint support	Punch hole [ center of the screen ] Display
iQOO Neo7	Mediatek Dimensity 8200	Eight cores, Cortex-A78 ( 3.1 GHz ) + 3× Cortex-A78 (3.0 GHz) + 4× Cortex-A55 ( 2.0 GHz )	Mali-G610 MC6	8/12 GB LPDDR5	UFS 3.1	Android 13	FuntouchOS 13	164.8 × 76.9 × 8.6 mm	194g	5000 mAh	USB-C 120W	6.76″ inches Amoled, HDR 10+ 120 Hz with 1200 Hz touch sampling rate, 1300 Nits Brightness Display	Three lenses at the rear, 64 MP main camera with OIS + 2 MP Macro + 2 MP Depth	16 MP [f/2.5]	Under-display optical fingerprint support	Punch hole [ center of the screen ] Display
iQOO Neo6	Qualcomm Snapdragon 870 (SM8450)	Eight cores, Cortex-X2 (3.00 GHz) + 3× Cortex-A710 (2.50 GHz) + 4× Cortex-A510 (1.80 GHz)	Adreno 730	8/12 GB LPDDR5	128/256 GB UFS 3.1	Android 12	OriginOS 2.0 (Ocean) (China) FuntouchOS 12 (International)	163 × 76.2 × 8.5 (or 8.9, depending on the back) mm	194 or 197.2 g (depending on the thickness)	4700 mAh	USB-C 80W	6.62", 2400×1080, E4 Super AMOLED, 120 Hz, HDR10+, 1300 nits of peak brightness	Three lenses at the rear, 64 MP main camera with OIS + 12 MP ultra wide angle + 2 MP depth sensor	16MP	Under-display optical fingerprint support	Hole punch screen in the center
iQOO Neo6 SE (also known as vivo T2 and Indian iQOO Neo6)	Qualcomm Snapdragon 870	Eight cores, Kryo 585, 1 + 3 + 4 cores (3.20 GHz + 2.42 GHz + 1.80 GHz)	Adreno 650	8/12 GB LPDDR5	128/256 GB UFS 3.1	Android 12	OriginOS 2.0 (Ocean) (China) FuntouchOS 12 (International)	163 × 76.2 × 8.5 mm	190 g	4700 mAh	USB-C 80W	6.62", 2400×1080, E4 Super AMOLED, 120 Hz, HDR10+, 1300 nits of peak brightness	Three lenses at the rear, 64 MP main camera with OIS + 8 MP ultra wide angle + 2 MP macro	16MP	Under-display optical fingerprint support	Hole punch screen in the center
iQOO Neo5 SE (rebrand of iQOO Neo5 Lite)	Qualcomm Snapdragon 870	Eight cores, Kryo 585, 1 + 3 + 4 cores (3.20 GHz + 2.42 GHz + 1.80 GHz)	Adreno 650	8/12 GB LPDDR5	128/256 GB UFS 3.1	Android 11	OriginOS 2.0 (Ocean)	164.7 × 76.7 × 8.54 mm	189g	4500 mAh	USB-C 66W	6.67", 2400×1080, IPS LCD, 144 Hz	Three lenses at the rear, 50 MP main camera + 8 MP ultra wide angle + 2 MP macro	16MP	Side-mounted fingerprint support	Hole punch screen in the center
iQOO Neo5S (also known as iQOO 9 SE outside China, rebrand of iQOO Neo5)	Qualcomm Snapdragon 888	Eight cores, Kryo 680, 1 + 3 + 4 cores (2.84 GHz + 2.42 GHz + 1.80 GHz)	Adreno 660	8/12 GB LPDDR5	128/256 GB UFS 3.1	Android 11	OriginOS 2.0 (Ocean)	163.2 × 76.4 × 8.4 mm	196g	4500 mAh	USB-C 66W	6.62", 2400×1080, AMOLED, 120 Hz, 1200 nits of peak brightness	Three lenses at the rear, 48 MP main camera with OIS + 13 MP ultra wide angle + 2 MP depth sensor	16MP	Under-display optical fingerprint support	Hole punch screen in the center
iQOO Neo5 Lite	Qualcomm Snapdragon 870	Eight cores, Kryo 585, 1 + 3 + 4 cores (3.2 GHz + 2.42 GHz + 1.80 GHz)	Adreno 650	8/12 GB LPDDR4x	128/256 GB UFS 3.1	Android 11	OriginOS for iQOO	163.7 × 75.5 × 8.9 mm	198.3 g	4500 mAh	USB-C, 44 W	6.57", 2408×1080, 144 Hz IPS LCD	Three lenses at the rear, 48 MP main camera + 8 MP ultra wide angle + 2 MP macro	16MP	Side mounted fingerprint	Hole punch screen in the upper right corner
iQOO Neo5 (also known as iQOO 7 in India)	Qualcomm Snapdragon 870	Eight cores, Kryo 585, 1 + 3 + 4 cores (3.2 GHz + 2.42 GHz + 1.80 GHz)	Adreno 650	8/12 GB LPDDR4x	128/256 GB UFS 3.1	Android 11	OriginOS for iQOO	163.3 × 76.4 × 8.4 mm	196 g	4400 mAh	USB-C, 66 W	6.62", 2400×1080, 120 Hz AMOLED	Three lenses at the rear, 48 MP main camera + 13 MP ultra wide angle + 2 MP depth of field	16MP	Under-screen optical fingerprint	Hole punch screen in the center
iQOO Neo3	Qualcomm Snapdragon 865	Eight cores, Kryo 585, 1 + 3 + 4 cores (2.84 GHz + 2.42 GHz + 1.80 GHz)	Adreno 650	6/8/12 GB LPDDR4x	128/256 GB UFS 3.1	Android 10	IQOO UI	163.7 × 75.5 × 8.9 mm	198.1 g	4500 mAh	USB-C, 44 W	6.57", 2408×1080, 144 Hz IPS LCD	Three lenses at the rear, 48 MP main camera + 8 MP ultra wide angle + 2 MP macro	16MP	Side mounted fingerprint	Hole punch screen in the upper right corner
iQOO Neo	Qualcomm Snapdragon 845	Eight cores, Kryo 385, 4 + 4 cores (2.8 GHz + 1.8 GHz)	Adreno 630	6/8 GB	64/128 GB	Android 9.0 "Pie"	Funtouch OS 9	159.5 × 75.2 × 8.1 mm	199g	4500 mAh	USB-C, 22.5W	6.4", 2340×1080, AMOLED	Three lenses at the rear, 12 MP main camera + 8 MP wide angle + 2 MP secondary camera	12MP	Under-screen optical fingerprint	Dew drop screen
iQOO Neo 855 version	Qualcomm Snapdragon 855	Eight cores, Kryo 485, 1 + 3 + 4 cores (2.84 GHz + 2.42 GHz + 1.80 GHz)	Adreno 640	6/8 GB	64/128/256 GB	Android 9.0 "Pie"	iQOO Monster UI based on Funtouch OS 9	159.5 × 75.2 × 8.1 mm	199g	4500 mAh	USB-C, 22.5W	6.4", 2340×1080, AMOLED	Three lenses at the rear, 12 MP main camera + 8 MP wide angle + 2 MP secondary camera	16MP	Under-screen optical fingerprint	Dew drop screen
iQOO Neo 855 Racing Edition	Qualcomm Snapdragon 855+	Eight cores, Kryo 485, 1 + 3 + 4 cores (2.96 GHz + 2.42 GHz + 1.80 GHz)	Adreno 640	8/12 GB	128 GB	Android 9.0 "Pie"	iQOO Monster UI based on Funtouch OS 9	159.5 × 75.2 × 8.1 mm	199g	4500 mAh	USB-C, 33W	6.4", 2340×1080, AMOLED	Three lenses at the rear, 12 MP main camera + 8 MP wide angle + 2 MP secondary camera	16MP	Under-screen optical fingerprint	Dew drop screen

=== Custom UI ===
While introducing iQOO 3, along with it iQOO UI 1.0 is also introduced as its custom UI of iQOO on top of Android 10 for its smartphone lineup with customisable 'Always on' display and gaming focus features.
